= Josephine Talamantez =

American historian

- Born: San Diego, California
- Other names: Josie Talamantez
- Occupation: Historian

Josephine S. "Josie" Talamantez is a historian from San Diego, California. She co-founded Chicano Park in 1970 and helped develop it into a cultural National Historic Landmark containing the largest collection of artistic murals in the United States. Talamantez was also the Chief of Programs for the California Arts Council, served as the director of the Centro Cultural de la Raza, and was on the board of the National Association of Latino Arts and Culture.

== Biography ==
Josephine Talamantez was born and raised in the Logan Heights neighborhood of San Diego. She attended San Diego High School and received a B.A. in Sociology from University of California, Berkeley. She received a master's degree in public history from California State University, Sacramento. Her grandmother moved to Logan Heights in the early 20th century, and Talamantez is the third generation to live in that area.

Talamantez was the Chief of Programs for the California Arts Council from 1987-2011. She also served as the executive director of the Centro Cultural de la Raza, and was on the board of the National Association of Latino Arts and Culture.

== Creation and stewardship of Chicano Park ==
In 1970, the California Highway Patrol announced they were planning to build a substation below the Coronado bridge, replacing a potential park area that was there. Local residents, including Talamantez, responded by staging a 12-day occupation and successfully demanded that the space be allowed to remain a park. Talamantez, who was 18 years old and a student at San Diego City College at the time, helped found the Chicano Park Steering Committee to negotiate with officials on behalf of the park.

In 1973, Talamantez and others in the Steering Committee started discussing the addition of Mexican-American artwork to the park. Over the next 20 years, many pieces of artwork were added, including more than 70 murals by Chicano artists from across California, making the park the largest collection of murals in the United States. Other works of art in the park include sculptures, earthworks, and an architectural piece dedicated to the cultural heritage of the community.

Talamantez is currently working towards opening a Chicano Park Museum and Cultural Center inside a nearby city-owned building that used to house the Cesar Chavez Continuing Education Center.

=== Landmark status ===
Talamantez successfully submitted the nomination of Chicano Park to the National Register in 2013. Talamantez and Manny Galaviz submitted the proposal that successfully included Chicano Park as a National Landmark due to its association with the Chicano Movement in 2016.

In 1997, Talamantez began the process of placing Chicano Park with its artwork and murals on the National Register in order to prevent the city from damaging the murals while retrofitting Coronado Bridge. Years later, Talamantez traveled to Washington, D.C. to make a case before a national review and advisory committee, and Chicano Park was successfully designated as a National Historic Landmark in December 2016.
