= Guillermo Acevedo =

Guillermo Acevedo (1920–1988) was a Peruvian-born artist and master draftsman, most famous in the United States for his striking portrayal of Native Americans of the Southwest, and for his ability to capture and help preserve the disappearing architectural styles of old neighborhoods throughout the U.S. and abroad. Known to be an artist-observer with great sensitivity, Acevedo is recognized as a master at recording the human condition.

== Biography ==
Guillermo Acevedo was born on October 5, 1920, in Arequipa, Peru, a city which lies near the base of Volcan Misti in Southern Peru. His father, Sebastian Acevedo Sanchez, was an architect, builder, and visionary. The family moved to the capital city of Lima when young Acevedo was sixteen years of age.

Guillermo Acevedo (1948) Self Portrait. Pastels

Acevedo studied art at Escuela Nacional de Bellas Artes in Lima and later owned and operated "La Pelota", an advertising business and commercial art studio. Although Acevedo was in high demand for his commercial drawings and designs, La Pelota began to nurture a downtown arts scene, becoming a post-war, bohemian-styled arts center where local and international artists would gather and work.

In 1959, Acevedo immigrated to the United States as an intellectual refugee. Although he hoped to establish himself in New York City, he settled with his wife and three children in San Diego, California after experiencing what he considered to be a welcoming cultural diversity, pleasant climate, and the eucalyptus trees which reminded him of his native Arequipa. In San Diego, Acevedo transferred his creative success and his love for the arts and culture.

While working as an art designer for local companies, Acevedo began to display his paintings and drawings at the weekend "art-marts" in Balboa Park in San Diego. His works soon caught the attention of collectors hungry for reflections of local beauty.

His special passion for depicting Victorian homes in San Diego neighborhoods helped spur local efforts to save the historical landmark houses which were disappearing from view as modern construction took over in the 1960s. Acevedo participated in the founding of the Save Our Heritage Organization (SOHO), an organization which seeks to preserve the cultural and architectural heritage of San Diego.

Hawthorn and First Avenue (1968) by Guillermo Acevedo. Pencil Drawing

From here, Acevedo is noted for helping to establish and nourish the local arts scene, appearing in local papers and arts magazines including the San Diego Tribune, Los Angeles Times, and a special California issue of American Artist (September 1969). Acevedo is considered to be one of the first Latino artists of the 1960s to achieve recognition and fame in the local Southern California media. In this role, he helped inspire a new generation of Chicano artists, many of whom became his following during the new and growing Chicano Movement of the 1970s.

In 1970, Acevedo supported the creation of Centro Cultural de la Raza, a cultural arts center in Balboa Park, and the historic take-over and creation of Chicano Park in the Barrio Logan neighborhood of San Diego. The Park, a site world-famous for its murals and as a center of Chicano culture, was recently placed on the National Register of Historic Places. In the mid 1970s, Acevedo was honored at the Museum of Man in Balboa Park with a year-long exhibition honoring images of Peru.

In 1976, Acevedo opened Acevedo Art Gallery International, first in downtown San Diego, and later in San Diego's Mission Hills neighborhood. The two-story downtown space was the first of its kind in the area. First serving mainly Latino artists, the space diversified and evolved into the Community Arts Center. It served as a cultural space which drew artists of different backgrounds, later spurring the creation of a downtown arts district. During these years, Acevedo traveled throughout Europe and South America, painting and drawing and exhibiting his art. In 1977, he moved with his wife Lydia to San Francisco, attracted by the cultural diversity and growing arts scene. He continued to serve as a mentor artist through his San Diego gallery and continued work in San Francisco through the 1980s.

Guillermo Acevedo died in October 1988. Before his death, he was honored by SOHO for his life-long contributions to arts and culture. August 9, 1988 was declared to be "Guillermo Acevedo Day" by then San Diego mayor Maureen O'Connor.

== Works ==
Media

As a master draftsman, Acevedo produced mainly grease pencil drawings (also known as Chinese wax pencil), acrylic paintings, and etchings.

Subjects Acevedo was particularly attracted to buildings, urban landscapes, and people, and is most noted for his realism and delicate attention to detail.

Works and commissions include renderings of "old neighborhood" architecture. Acevedo was particularly moved by the historical Victorian structures of San Diego and San Francisco, adobe homes of the American Southwest, and urban landscapes of Lima and Cusco, Peru and the Mediterranean.

In San Diego, Acevedo is also noted for his historical documentation of Barrio Logan's canaries and for capturing the activity of the once-robust tuna industry along San Diego Bay.

In terms of human subjects, Acevedo was inspired by his travels, encounters with native populations, and socio-political movements of the times. He began by depicting indigenous Peruvian/Incan subjects. This later evolved into indigenous Mexicans, typical environments of Tijuana, Mexico and finally indigenous peoples of the American Southwest. Here, Acevedo was particularly moved by the Apache, Hopi, and Dineh Navajo, evidenced in his powerfully realistic images.

Acevedo's San Diego works were most recently featured at an exhibit at San Diego International Airport from January 2015 to January 2016. Much of his collection continues to be on display at the gallery home of his son, noted Chicano artist Mario Torero,
