= Statue of Emiliano Zapata (San Diego) =

Statue in San Diego, California, U.S.

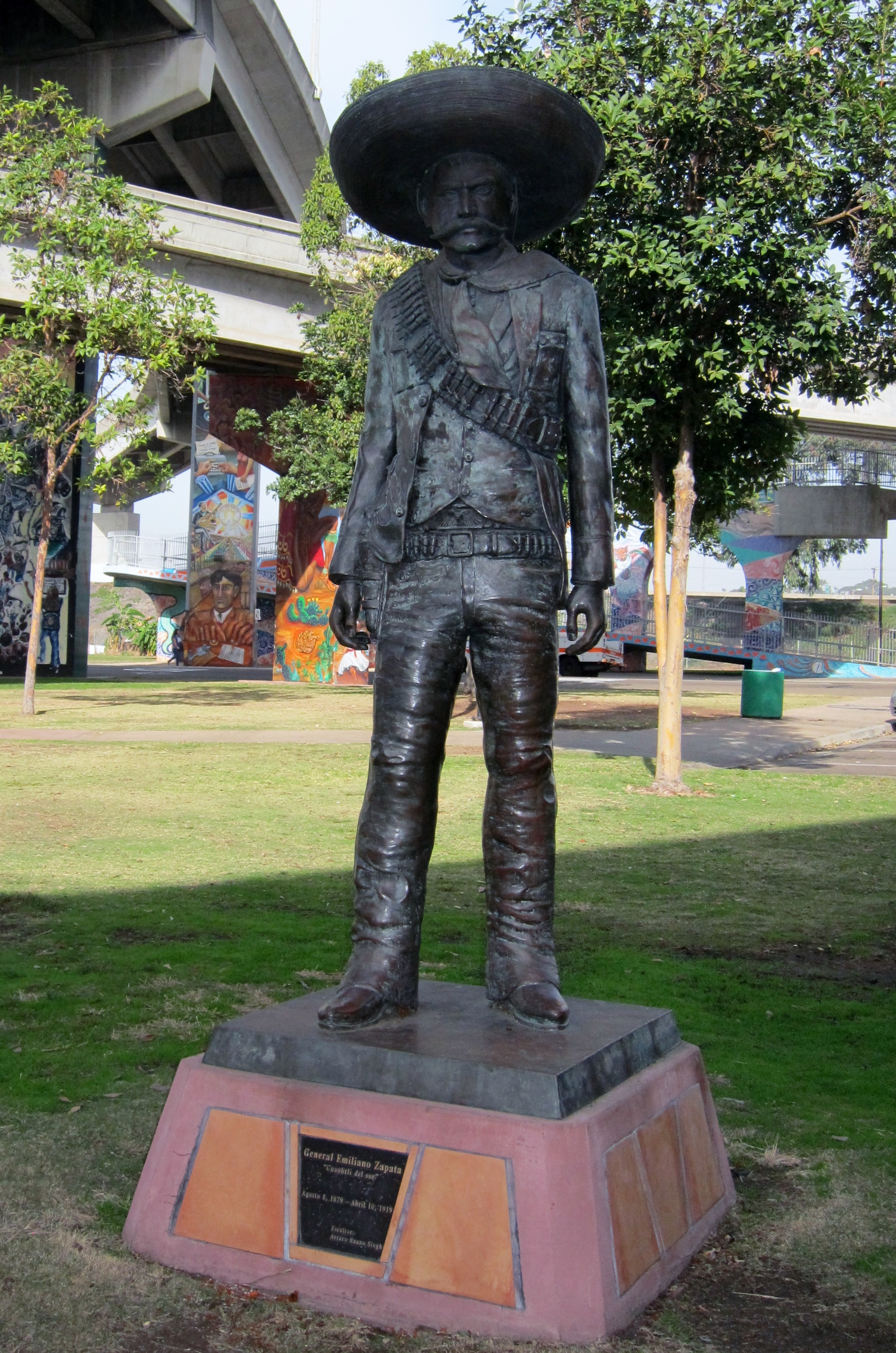
- Year: 2004
- Subject: Emiliano Zapata
- Location: Chicano Park, Barrio Logan, San Diego; 32.7000°N 117.1429°W

The statue of Emiliano Zapata, honoring Mexican Revolution leader Emiliano Zapata, is installed at Chicano Park, in the Barrio Logan neighborhood of San Diego, California, United States.

== History ==
The statue was sculpted by artist Arturo Ruano Singh in 2004 and erected in Chicano Park, in the Barrio Logan neighborhood of San Diego.

== Inscription ==
The Spanish inscription on the monument reads:

General Emiliano Zapata

"Cuauhtli del sur"
Agosto 8, 1879 - Abril 10, 1919
Escultor:
Arturo Ruano Singh
