= Ballet Folklorico Aztlan =

Ballet Folklorico en Aztlan
- Formation: 1967
- Legal status: 501(c)3 public benefit organization
- Location: 3338 Main Street Lemon Grove, CA 91945
- Region served: San Diego, California
- Website: Ballet Folklorico en Aztlan

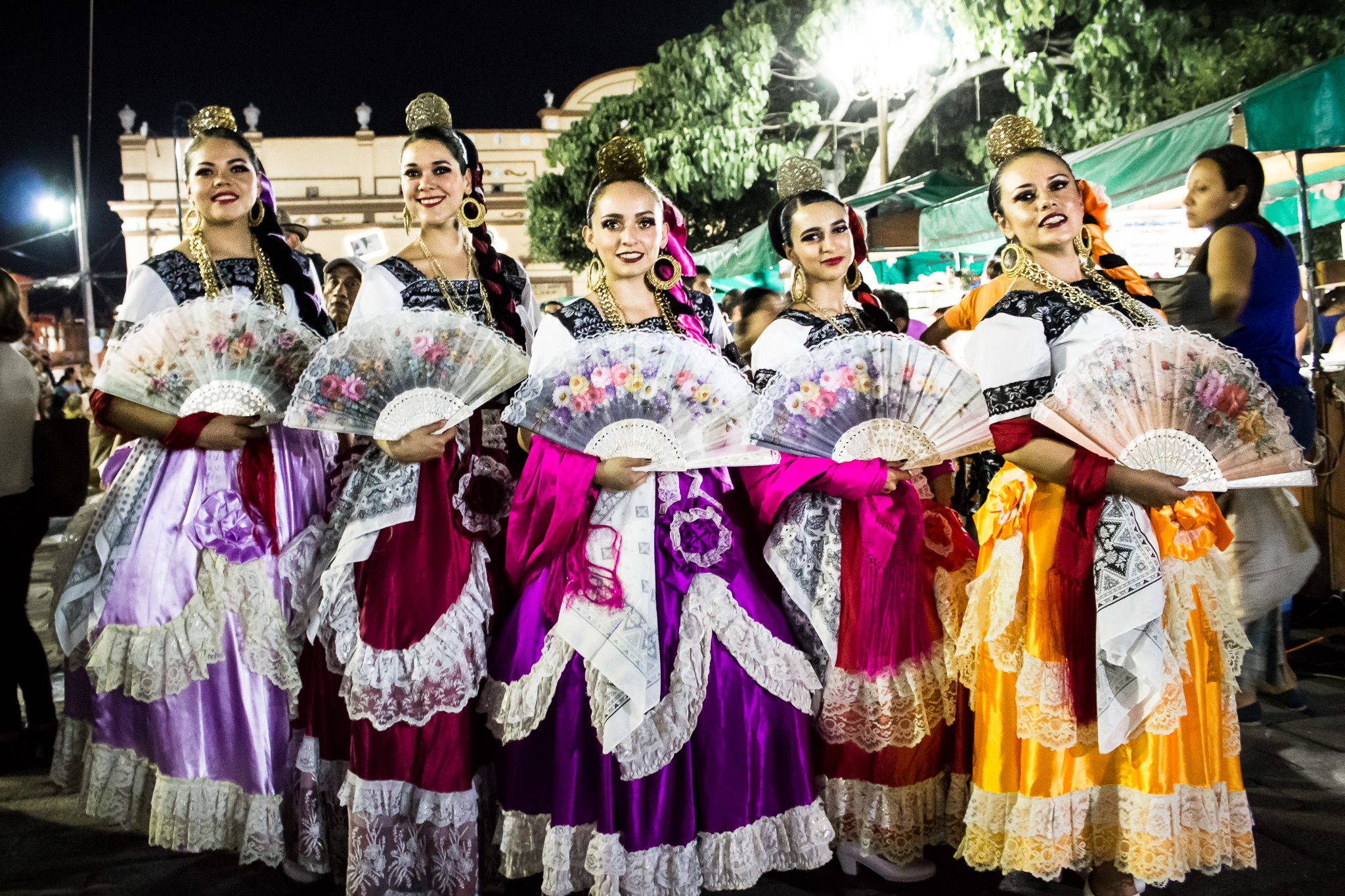
Ballet folklorico Jalisco

Ballet Folklorico en Aztlan (BFA) is a Chicano dance company focusing on Mexican folklore, and blending traditional dance with contemporary movements. The group was founded in 1967 by Hermina Enrique. Currently, her daughter, Viviana Enrique Acosta, is the Artistic Director. The members of BFA were instrumental in founding the Centro Cultural de la Raza which was the first home of the BFA.

The name of Ballet Folklorico en Aztlan references the Chicano concept of "Aztlán" which refers to the American Southwest. The dance group's performances, relating to Mexican and indigenous dance and culture are meant to preserve the historical tradition of the peoples of Aztlan. Ballet Folklorico refers to traditional dance in Mexico and was popularized in the 1960s.

== History ==
Prior to moving to San Diego in 1967, Enrique had lived in San Antonio, and expected to find services for folklorico dancing in the city. Her sons and daughters helped teach classes with her. These classes grew in popularity and led to the creation of BFA.

The BFA first became involved with members who later formed the Centro Cultural de la Raza in 1969.

Through the 1970s and 1980s, classes were taught at the Centro by Isabel, Teresa, Veronica and Viviana Enrique (later Viviana Enrique Acosta), along with other teachers.

=== Recent history ===
BFA offers dance classes for children and adults at Muevete Dance Studio in Lemon Grove, California.

Director of BFA, Acosta, has been inducted to San Diego Women's Hall of Fame as a Historian and for her work with BFA.
