= Carmen Linares-Kalo =

American artist

Carmen Linares-Kalo is an indigenous mural artist and fourth-generation spiritualist and practitioner of the Uto Nahua Mexica/Aztec traditions. She is based in San Diego and most known for her work on a mural located in Chicano Park in honor of the Kumeyaay people.

Growing up in Mexico with her grandmother inspired a majority of Kalo's work as well as her interest in spiritualism and the strong connection she has with her work.

== Selected artwork ==
Kalo is very guarded when it comes to sharing her pieces with the world. On November 14, 2019, people were able to see her pieces in an art showcase called SPIRIT hosted by the Cross-Cultural Center in the University of California, San Diego. Over 20 paintings and sculptures from Kalo were placed on display with a particularly selected few up for purchase. Because of her strong connection to some pieces not all were sold out of respect for who they were dedicated and inspired by.

One of Kalo's most notable murals is located in Chicano Park. The mural was inspired by the Kumeyaay people and shows their entire creation story. Over the span of 26 years of planning and two weeks of creation Kalo was able to see her vision come to life with the help of other artists and volunteers from the community in August 2020. Her indigenous background and exposure to the Kumeyaay creation story pushed Kalo to create this mural. She wanted to utilize a set of blank pillars located on the land that the Kumeyaay people inhabited for about 12,000 years. For Kalo this mural was about preserving the history of the Kumeyaay people and honoring them in some way by exhibiting their culture on sacred land. She wanted to go about this mural in the most respectful way possible so she received a blessing from the Kumeyaay people to create a piece that would keep their people remembered.

The mural consists of a wide variety of elements including animals like a crow, a snake, a coyote, and a red tailed hawk which represent humans. The focal point of the mural is a blue heart which is used to represent the creator and all the animals are gathered around the heart in mourning.

Kalo says, "What you see on the mural, it's a cremation, it's got a lot of different little meanings. That always came back to me — out of death it united these humans, and even with our differences, we can work together and make life better."

In addition to the mural dedicated to the Kumeyaay people, Kalo was also a part of creating numerous others in Chicano park. Some of those include the Izcalli Mural (1997), Save Barrio Logan (1996), No Retrofitting (1995), Tribute Mural for Laura Rodriguez & Florencio Yescas (1996), ¿Por qué Nosotros? (1996), and Omenaje (2000) a mural dedicated to people who died during Operation Gatekeeper.
