= Salvador Torres =

American artist & muralist (born 1936)

Salvador Roberto Torres
- Born: Salvador Roberto Torres; July 3, 1936 (age 89); El Paso, Texas, U.S.
- Education: California College of Arts and Crafts; San Diego State University
- Known for: Painter, muralist
- Movement: Chicano art

Salvador Roberto Torres (born July 3, 1936) is a Chicano artist and muralist and an early exponent of the Chicano art movement. He was one of the creators of Chicano Park, and led the movement to create its freeway-pillar murals. He was also a founder of the Centro Cultural de la Raza in San Diego, California.

He was born in El Paso, Texas, but moved to San Diego with his family as a young child. He attended San Diego City College and the California College of Arts and Crafts in Oakland, California, where he earned a B.A.Ed. degree in art in 1964. In 1973 he earned an M.A. degree in painting and drawing from San Diego State University.

== Chicano Park ==
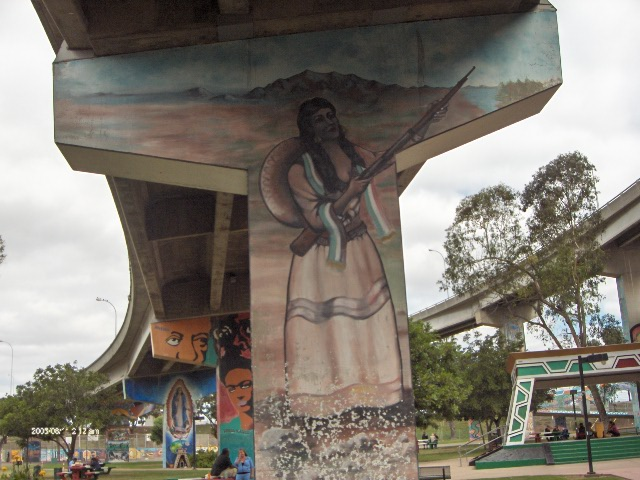
Murals in Chicano Park

Torres was raised in Barrio Logan, a neighborhood of San Diego largely inhabited by Mexican-Americans and Mexican immigrants. During his lifetime the neighborhood had been bisected by Interstate 5 and further impacted by the elevated onramps to the San Diego-Coronado Bridge. The two structures had resulted in the demolition of hundreds of homes, including his father's house where Torres had grown up. At first he deeply resented the bridge, but then he began to envision the huge concrete pillars as canvases where art could be created. He made sketches and watercolors of what such a project might look like, and in 1969 he created the Chicano Park Monumental Public Mural Program to promote his vision. However, Chicano Park was still mostly a dream, and urban wall murals were rare in the United States. In 1970 it appeared the residents' hopes for a park were going to be dashed once again, when bulldozers appeared at the site of the proposed park, intending to build a state Highway Patrol facility there instead. There was a spontaneous neighborhood uprising. Residents occupied the site of the proposed park for twelve days to block the construction. At a community meeting to deal with the impasse, Torres publicly proposed his idea of murals on the freeway pillars as part of the park. "Chicano artists and sculptors will turn the great columns of the bridge approach into a thing of beauty, reflecting the Mexican-American culture," he predicted.

For three years, while plans for the park were proceeding slowly through the city and state governments, Torres and other artists lobbied for permission to begin creating their murals. Finally in 1973 they received permission and painting began on March 23, 1973. Torres and many other artists expanded the project until it became the largest collection of Chicano murals in the world. In 1980 the city designated the park and its murals as a San Diego Historical Site. Torres is described as "the architect of the dream" for his role in inspiring and launching the project.

== Centro Cultural de la Raza ==
Torres was one of the founders of the Centro Cultural de la Raza, also in San Diego. He helped form Los Toltecas en Aztlán, a Chicano artists group that was instrumental in converting a former water tank in Balboa Park into a museum and cultural center with the specific mission of promoting, preserving and creating Chicano, native Mexicano, Latin American and Indian art and culture. He became the center's first director.

== Later activities ==
He produced murals for an NBC television pilot, The Fortunate Son. In 1993 he and his former wife, artist Gloria Robolledo Torres, completed the Kelco Historical Community Mural in Barrio Logan. In 2009 he was a visiting artist in residence at the University of California, Santa Barbara.

As a painter Torres is best known for his 1969 painting Viva La Raza, an oil on canvas that depicts the transformation of the eagle of the United Farm Workers of America into a rising phoenix. His work has been shown in a number of exhibitions, including Salvador Roberto Torres (1988), the nationally touring Chicano Art: Resistance and Affirmation (1990–93), and Made in California: 1900–2000 (2000).
