= Barrio Logan, San Diego =

- Community of San Diego
- Barrio Logan
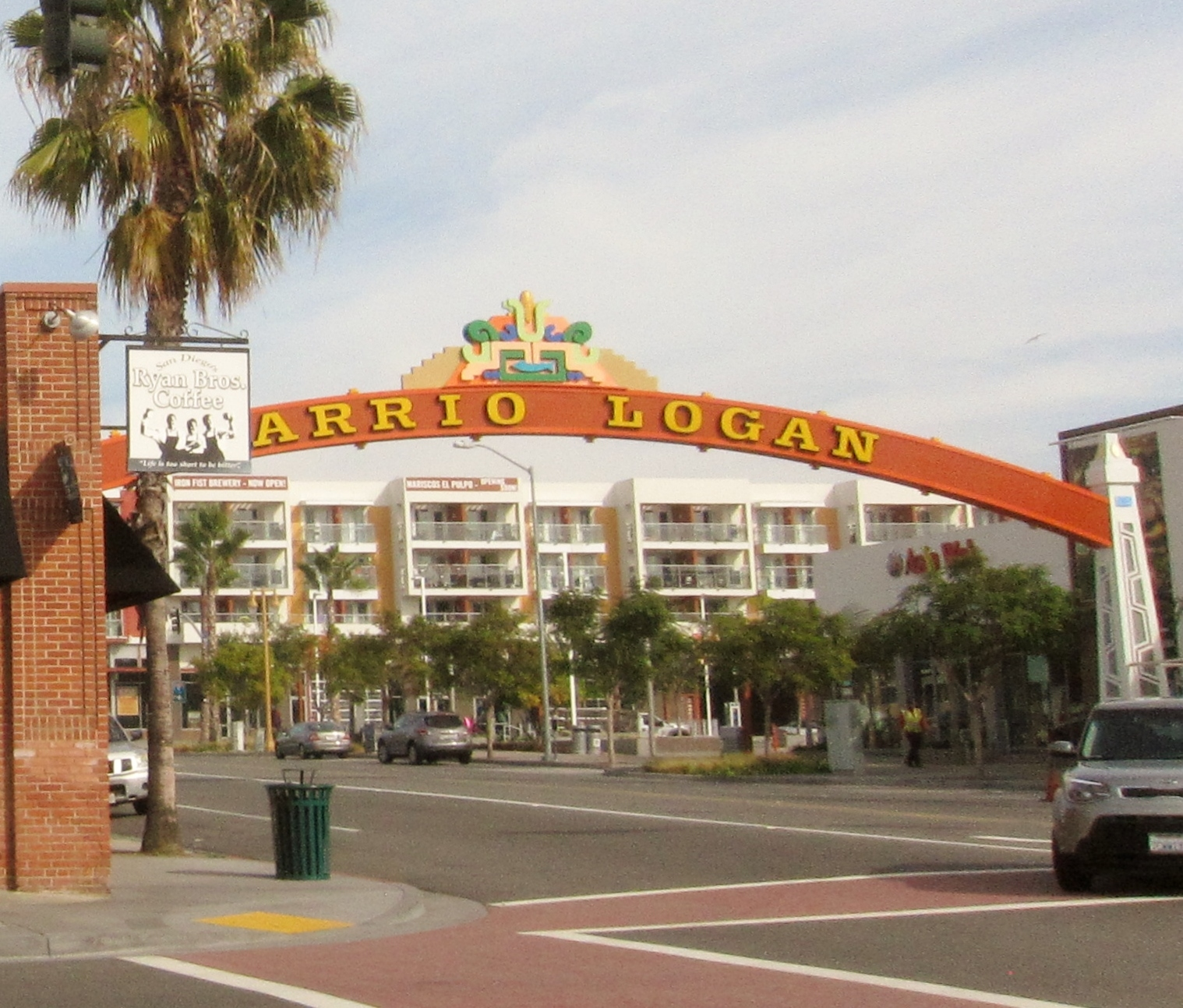
- Barrio Logan neighborhood sign near corner of Cesar E. Chavez Parkway and Main Street

- Location within Central San Diego Barrio Logan, San Diego (California) Barrio Logan, San Diego (the United States)
- Coordinates: 32.697539°N 117.142025°W
- Country: United States of America
- State: California
- County: San Diego
- City: San Diego

Barrio Logan is a neighborhood in south central San Diego, California. It is bordered by the neighborhoods of East Village and Logan Heights to the north, Shelltown and Southcrest to the east, San Diego Bay to the southwest, and National City to the southeast. Interstate 5 forms the northeastern boundary. The Barrio Logan Community Plan Area comprises approximately 1,000 acres, of which slightly more than half is under the jurisdiction of the Port of San Diego or the United States Navy rather than the city of San Diego. Barrio Logan is historically one of the most notable centers of the city's Chicano/Mexican-American community.

The community is subject to the California Coastal Act. Though located near the city's central core, it has long been considered part of Southeast San Diego by many locals, being directly southeast of downtown San Diego, and with previous historical records labeling it as part of "Western Southeast San Diego."

== History ==
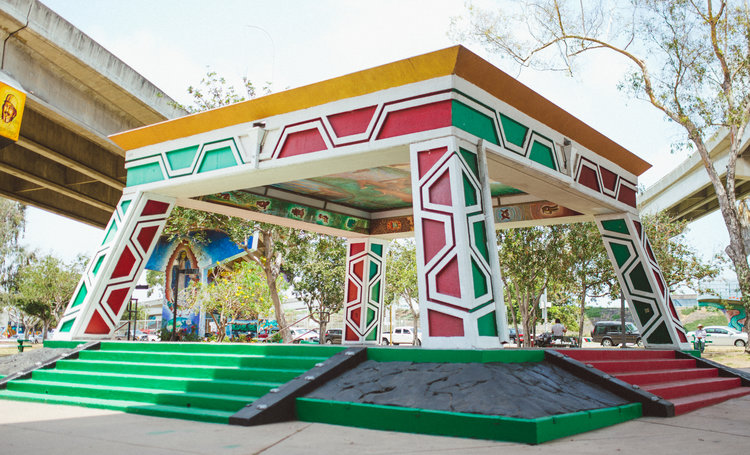
Kiosk at Chicano Park.

When the Spanish first entered the region, they found a Kumeyaay rancheria at the mouth of Chollas Creek.

In 1871, Congressman John A. Logan wrote legislation to provide federal land grants and subsidies for a transcontinental railroad ending in San Diego. A street laid in 1881 was named Logan Heights after him, and the name came to be applied to the general area. Plans for a railroad never successfully materialized, and the area was predominantly residential by the turn of the century, becoming one of San Diego's oldest communities.

Its transformation began in 1910 with the influx of refugees from the Mexican Revolution, who soon became the majority ethnic group. For this reason, the southern part of the original Logan Heights neighborhood came to be called Barrio Logan. (Barrio is a Spanish word for "neighborhood".)

From the early 1900s, Barrio Logan also became home to San Diego's tuna industry, particularly Pacific Tuna Canning Company and Van Camp Seafood Company (which is now Chicken of the Sea), providing employment to Italian, Mexican, Japanese, and Portuguese workers. The bayside served as residence for the local Issei Japanese community at Fish Camp Kushimoto (串本のキャンプ; kushimoto no kyampu) made up of stilt houses on the San Diego Bay before the community was demolished in WWII.

The area was originally residential with access to the beach at San Diego Bay. During World War II this beach access was lost due to the expansion of Naval Station San Diego and other military facilities on the waterfront. The neighborhood continued to degrade during the 1950s and 1960s due to rezoning that permitted industrial uses, the construction of Interstate 5 through the heart of the community in 1963, and the construction of the San Diego–Coronado Bridge in 1969, which covered much of the community with a concrete "roof" supported by gray concrete pillars.

The city council promised to build a community park under the bridge approaches, and a site was approved in June 1969. When construction began in April 1970 at the designated site, the community learned that the work was intended to create a state building instead of a park, and a nonviolent community uprising began. Students and others occupied the site and forced a halt to the construction.

The occupation of the site lasted twelve days. Residents planted landscaping, and a local artist, Salvador Torres, proclaimed his vision of covering the freeway support pillars with murals. After intense negotiation between the city and the state (which owned the land in question), the site was reclaimed for park use, and Chicano Park was built and dedicated. It was expanded several times and in 1990 it was extended all the way to the bay, restoring beach access to the community.

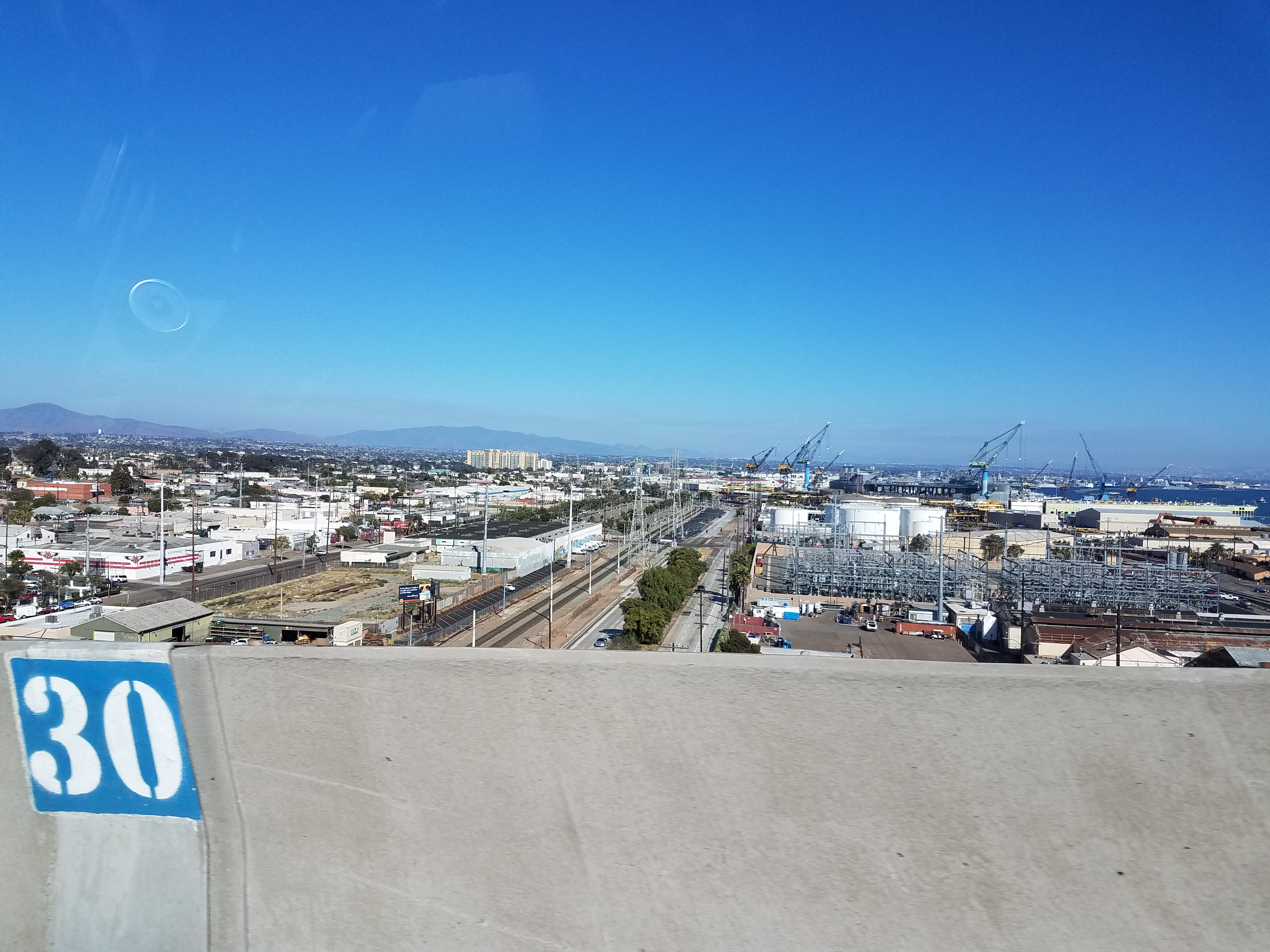
An industrial area and port facilities on San Diego Bay

The community contains many industrial areas, primarily shipbuilding and maritime uses, as well as many residences. In 2013 the neighborhood planning group drew up, and the City Council approved, a revised community plan which would have created a "buffer zone" of a commercial area separating residential uses from industrial uses. The ship-building industry, which objected to the buffer zone, organized and led a petition drive to overturn the plan via citywide vote. In June 2014 the voters rejected the community plan. A revised plan is in the draft stage as of 2015.

Since 2015, during the same time as San Diego Comic-Con is occurring less than two miles away, there has been Chicano-Con.

In 2017, the State of California designated Barrio Logan as a California Cultural District, recognizing the cultural significance of Chicano history in California.

In March 2026, the Port of San Diego began the process of renaming Cesar Chavez Park in Barrio Logan, after an executive order was issued by the Mayor of San Diego to remove his name from city assets following a New York Times investigation into historic sexual abuse allegations.

== Chicano Park ==
Barrio Logan, in Southeast San Diego, is referred to as el ombligo or navel, the center of the world.

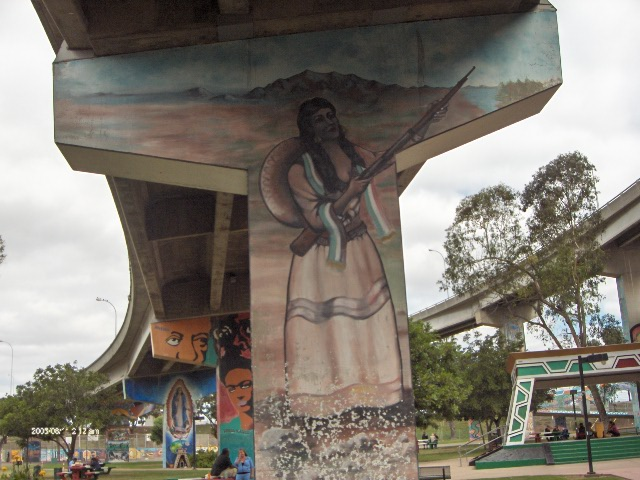
Murals in Chicano Park

Barrio Logan is the home of Chicano Park, a Chicano-themed public park created in large part by the local residents. It is located at the site of a 1970s demonstration, land takeover, and cultural renaissance for the Mexican-American community. It features more than 60 colorful murals painted on the concrete support piers for the San Diego–Coronado Bridge and Interstate 5. It was designated an official historic site by the San Diego Historical Site Board in 1980 and listed on the National Register of Historic Places in 2013.

== Economy ==
Barrio Logan is home to Naval Base San Diego, also known as 32nd Street Naval Station, as well as the NASSCO shipyard and other military-related facilities.

The neighborhood is also home to artist studios and galleries and hosts periodic Art Crawl. The painting of murals in Chicano Park had been discussed as part of the total park development since 1967.

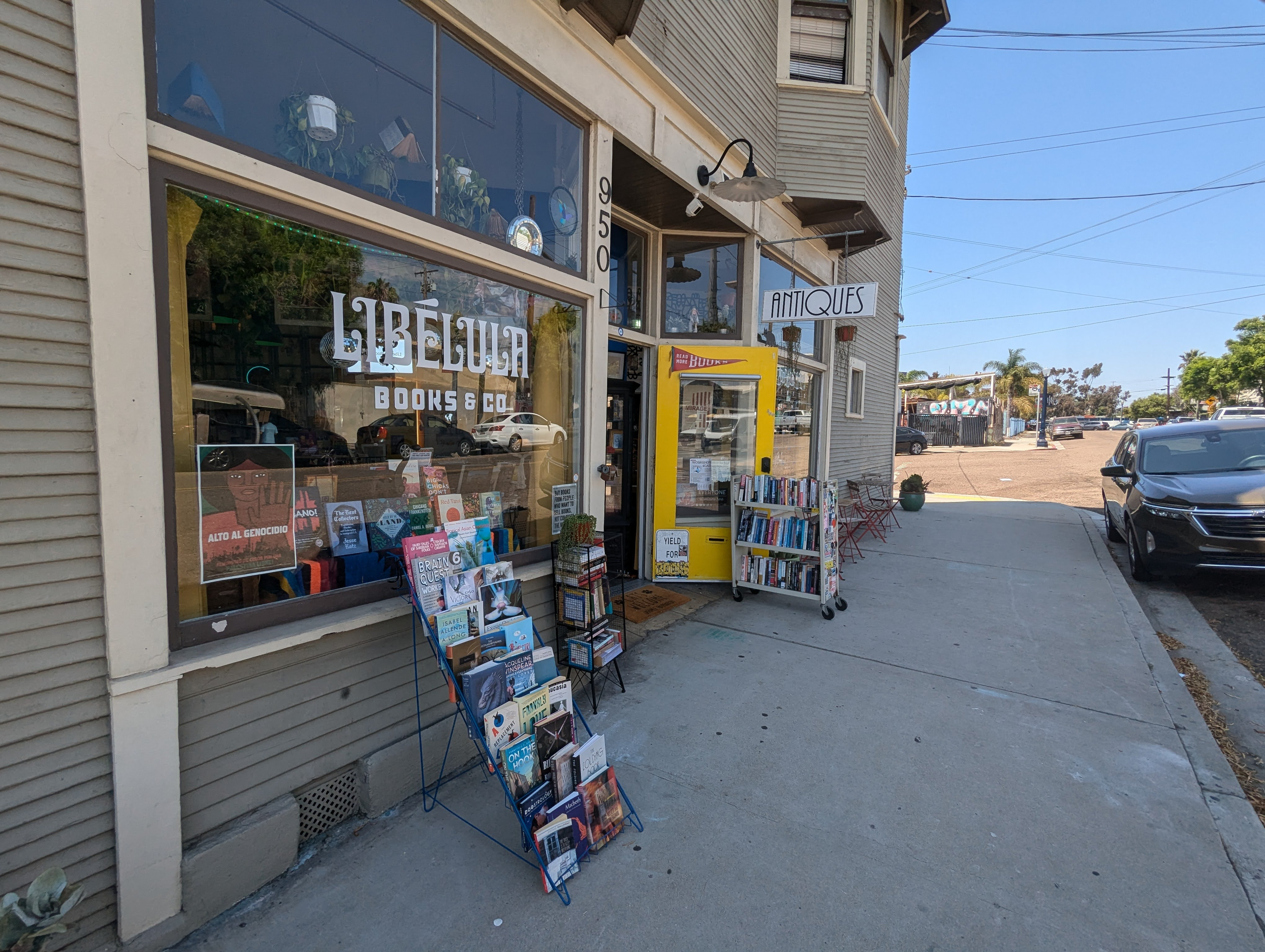
Libélula is an independent bookstore located in Barrio Logan.

Sew Loka is a small business in Barrio Logan that creates fashionable clothing. For the first time, she hosted a fashion show she showcased to celebrate the “slow fashion” movement, which espouses a sustainable and ethical approach to fashion.

Claudia Rodriguez-Biezunski is a textile artist, and the owner of the small business, Sew Loka. Claudia opened the sewing studio in 2013 and has been running her company ever since. She hosts sewing classes at her company. Every piece that she makes is made out of recycled and reclaimed fabric to help reduce clothing waste. Rodriguez is vocal about the large amount of denim factories use and she aims to minimize her waste. She prioritizes slow fashion and 1 of 1 pieces, so the products she makes are unique.

Libélula Books & Co. is an independent bookstore founded in June 2021 by Jesi Gutierrez and Celi Hernandez.

== Governance ==
Barrio Logan is part of City Council District 8 represented by Councilman Vivian Moreno. The Barrio Logan Community Planning Group was established in October 2014 when City Council gave approval at the recommendation of representative Alvarez. The Barrio Logan Community Planning Area was granted status as a redevelopment area, but the state of California abolished all redevelopment areas in 2012.

== Transportation ==
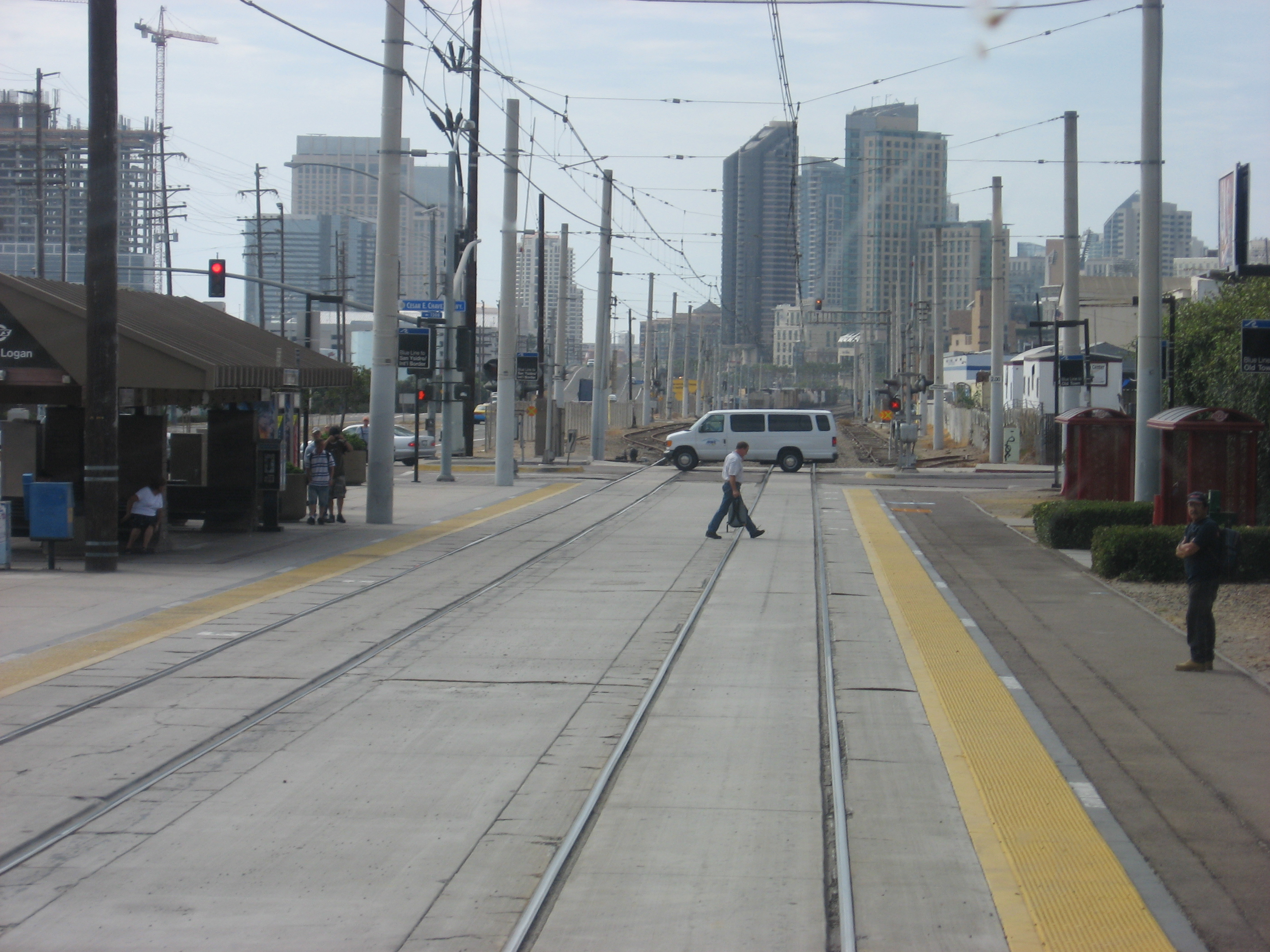
San Diego Trolley station in Logan

The area is served by the San Diego Trolley at Barrio Logan station.

== Gallery ==
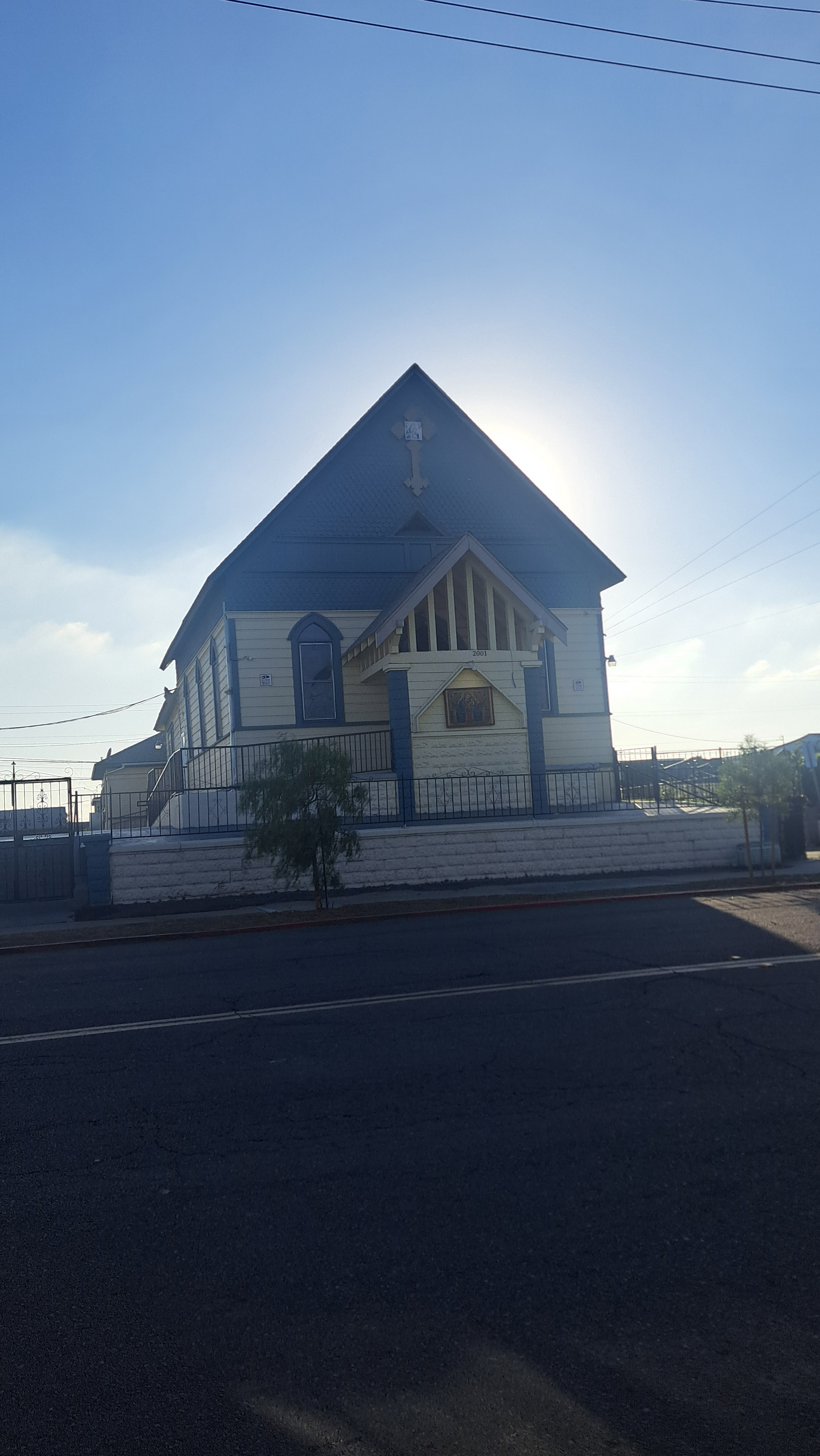
Eritrean Kidane Mihret, Orthodox Church

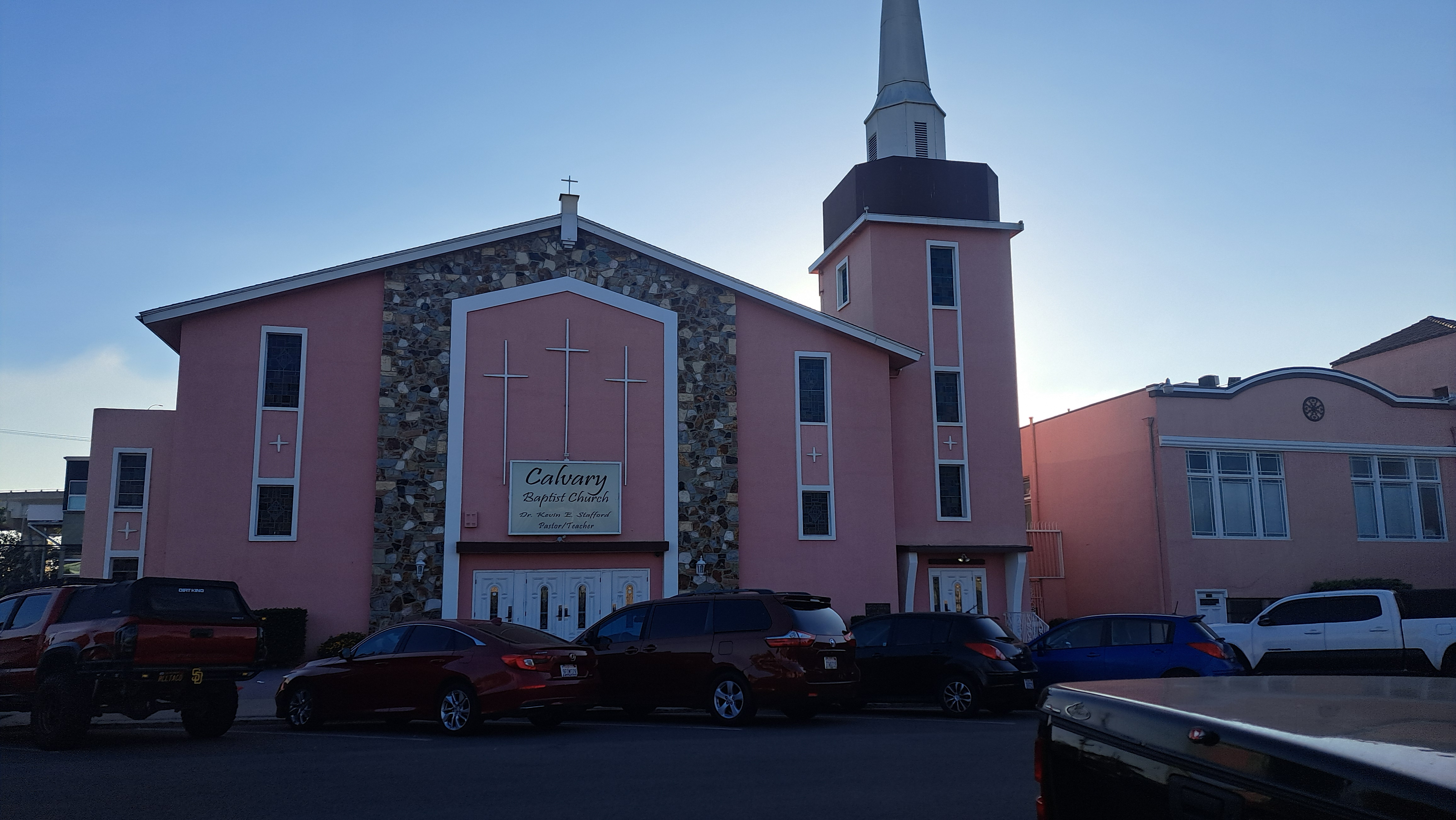
Calvary Baptist Church, Cesar E. Chavez Parkway

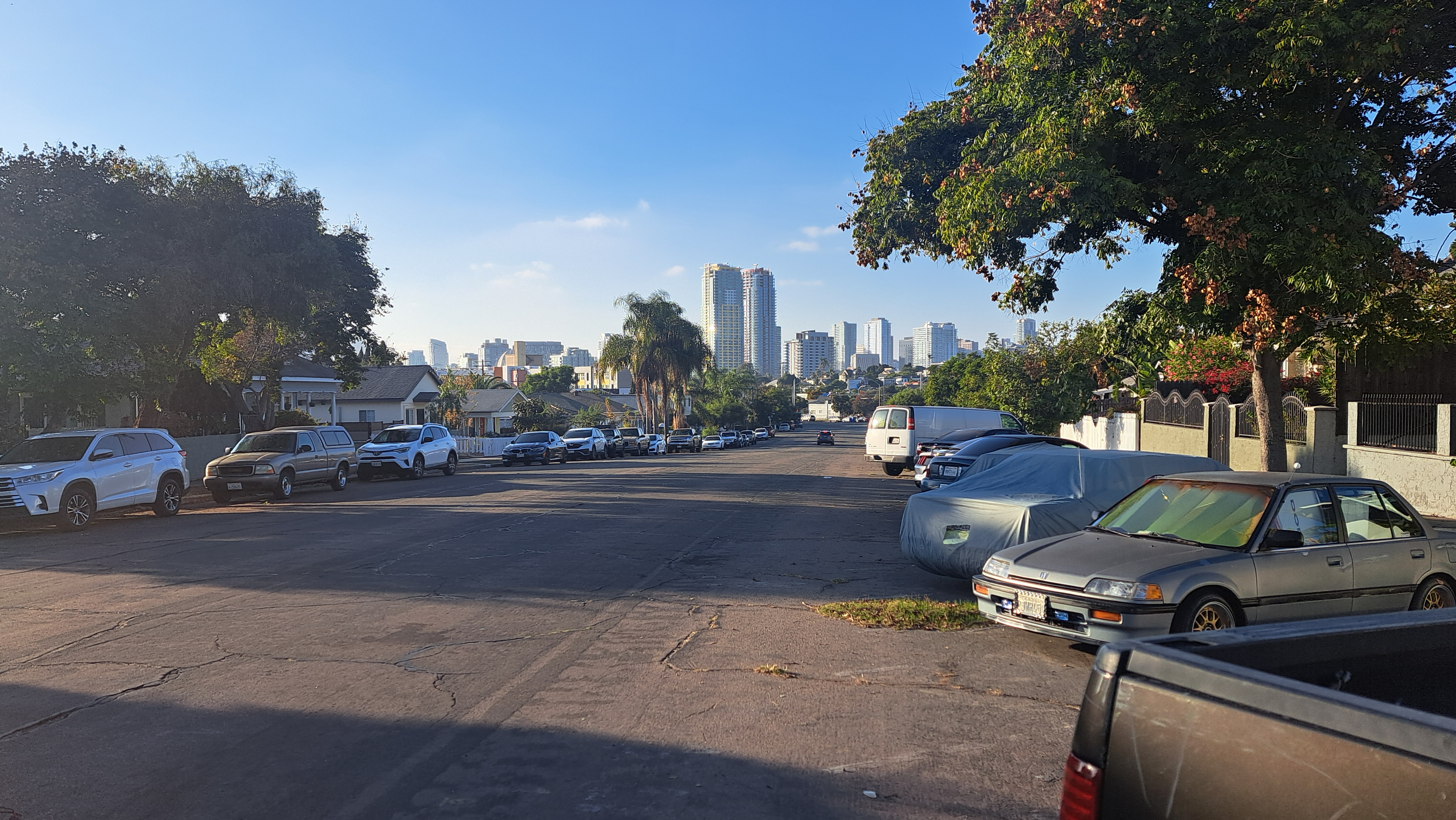
View from Harrison Ave and Dewey Street

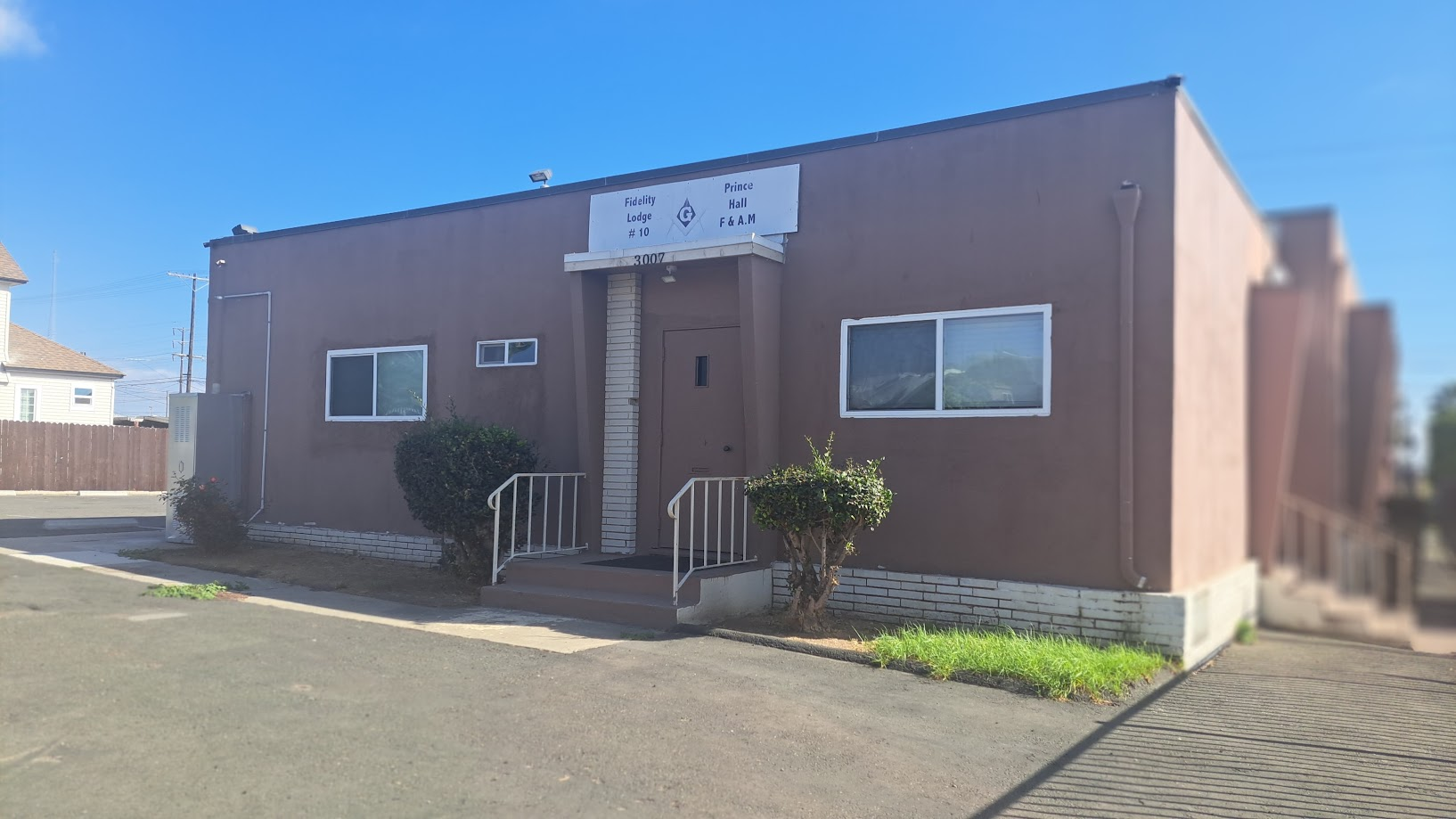
Prince Hall F & A.M. Fidelity Lodge No. 10

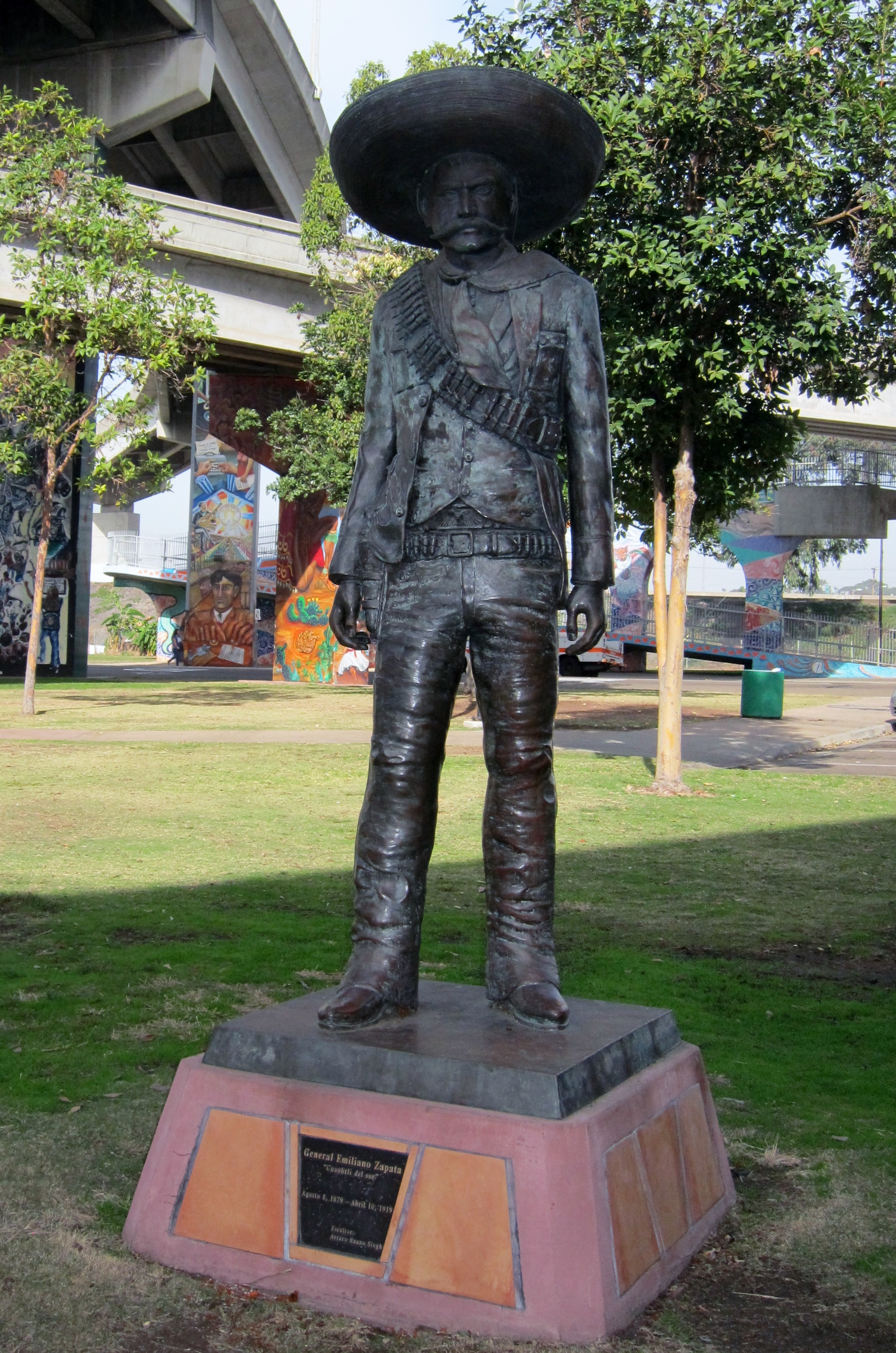
