= San Diego–Coronado Bridge =

Bridge over San Diego Bay, California, USA

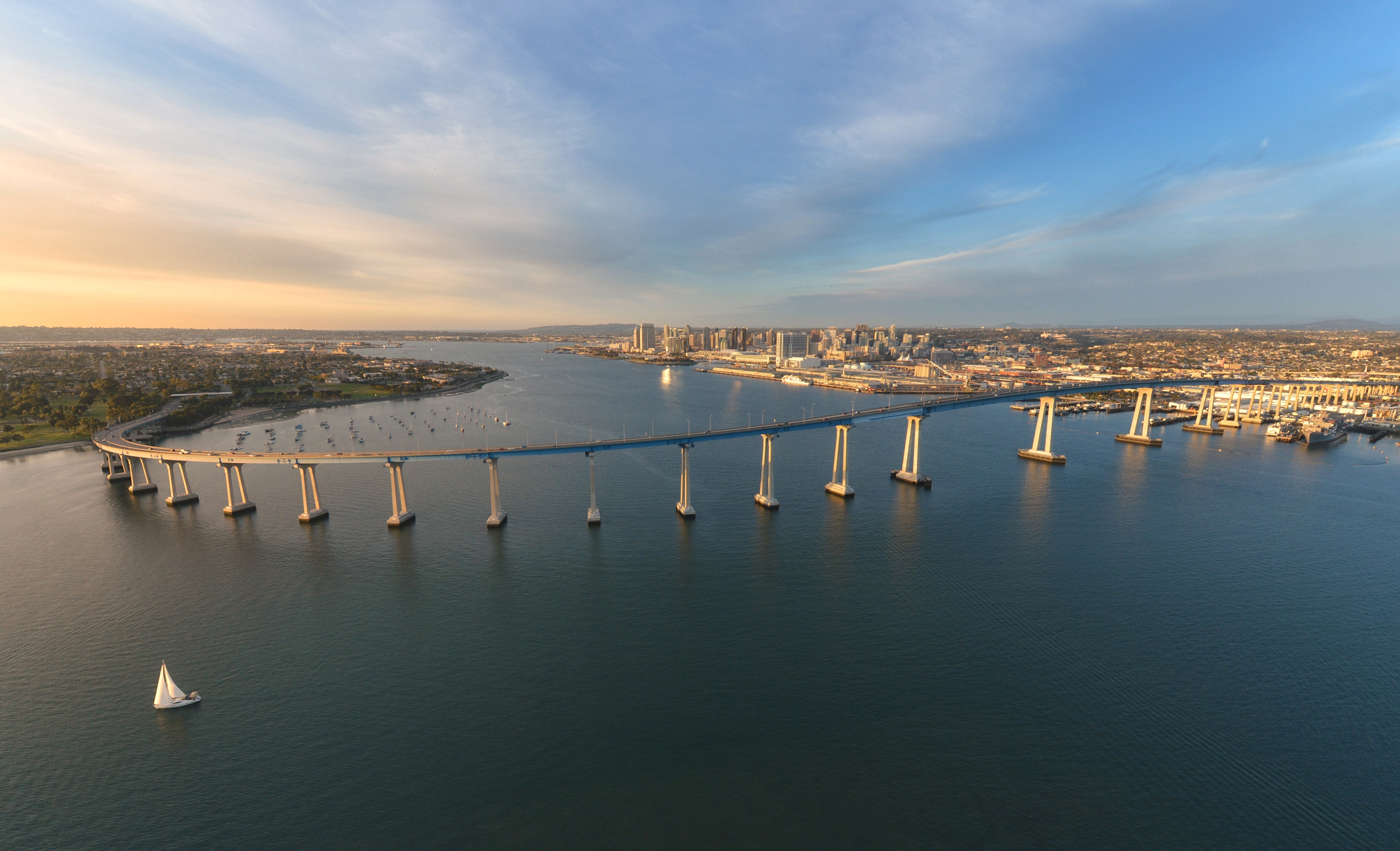
- Coronado Bridge In 2016
- Coordinates: 32.6865°N 117.1583°W
- Carries: 5 lanes of SR 75
- Crosses: San Diego Bay
- Locale: San Diego and Coronado, California
- Owner: State of California
- Maintained by: California Department of Transportation
- ID number: 57 0857

Characteristics
- Design: Orthotropic deck on box girder
- Material: Prestressed concrete and steel
- Total length: 11,179 feet (3,407 m) or 2.1 miles (3.4 km) (including approaches)
- Width: 63 feet (19 m) between curbs
- Longest span: 660 feet (200 m)
- No. of spans: 32
- Piers in water: 21
- Clearance below: 200 feet (61 m)

History
- Successful competition design: 1978 World Bridge Beauty Contest
- Constructed by: Murphy-Pacific
- Fabrication by: Murphy-Pacific
- Construction start: February 1967
- Construction cost: US$48 (equivalent to $421 in 2025) million
- Opened: August 3, 1969
- Replaces: San Diego and Coronado Ferry

Statistics
- Daily traffic: 75,000 (2009)

Location
- Interactive map of San Diego–Coronado Bridge

The San Diego–Coronado Bridge, commonly referred to as the Coronado Bridge, is a prestressed concrete/steel girder fixed-link bridge crossing over San Diego Bay, linking San Diego with Coronado, California. It is signed as part of State Route 75.

== Description ==
=== Construction ===
In 1926, John D. Spreckels recommended that a bridge be built between San Diego and Coronado, but voters dismissed the plan. The U.S. Navy initially did not support a bridge that would span San Diego Bay to connect San Diego to Coronado. They feared a bridge could collapse due to an attack or an earthquake and trap the ships stationed at Naval Base San Diego. In 1935, an officer at the naval air station at North Island argued that if a bridge were built to cross the bay then the Navy would leave San Diego.

In 1951–52, the Coronado City Council initiated plans for bridge feasibility studies. By 1964 the Navy supported a bridge if there was at least 200 feet (61 m) of clearance for ships which operate out of the nearby Naval Base San Diego to pass underneath it. To achieve this clearance with a reasonable grade, the bridge length was increased by taking a curved path rather than a more direct path to Coronado. The clearance would allow an empty oil-fired aircraft carrier to pass beneath it – it is not sufficient for Nimitz-class nuclear aircraft carriers in light load condition.

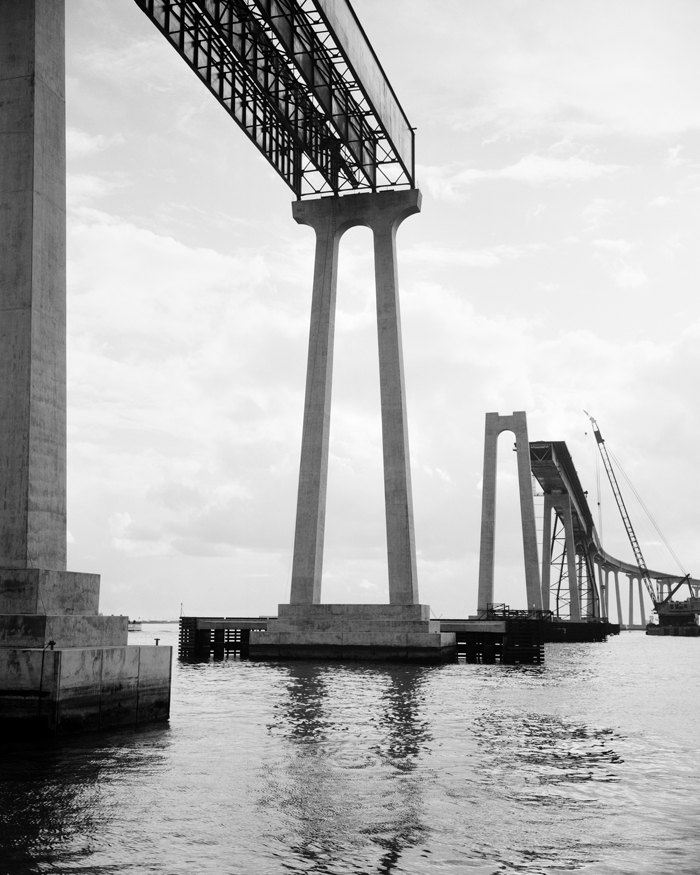
Waterline view of bridge construction, c. 1968

The principal architect was Robert Mosher. Mosher's job was to build a bridge that would provide transportation, allow ships access to the bay, and serve as an iconic landmark for San Diego. Mosher proposed a basic box and girder-style bridge for the framework, with a prestressed concrete and steel deck sitting atop steel girders and supported by towers. Mosher decided to make an orthotropic roadway, which used a stiffening technique that was new to the United States; it increased the strength and resistance of the bridge. As a result, the bridge was strong and eliminated the need for additional superstructures over the deck to disperse weight.

Construction on the San Diego–Coronado Bay Bridge started in February 1967. The bridge required 20,000 tons of steel (13,000 tons in structural steel and 7,000 in reinforcing steel) and 94,000 cubic yards of concrete. To add the concrete girders, 900,000 cubic yards of fill were dredged, and the caissons for the towers were drilled and blasted 100 feet into the bed of the bay.

Coronado residents however largely opposed the bridge, but then-California Governor Pat Brown "overrode their wishes" according to former city councilman Bob Odiorne, who also claimed that the opposition caused the city to lose opportunities to move the approaches to the bridge away from residential areas. Following attempts from Barbara Hutchinson, the vice president of the Kearny Mesa Town Council, to ask the Coronado and San Diego city councils to intervene in the construction, San Diego city attorney Edward Butler stated that the state had the ultimate authority to decide whether or not to build the bridge, and that the City of San Diego could not interfere.

The bridge opened to traffic on August 3, 1969, during the celebration of the 200th anniversary of the founding of San Diego. The 11,179-foot-long (3,407 m or 2.1 mi) bridge ascends from Coronado at a 4.67 percent grade before curving 80 degrees toward San Diego. It is supported by 27 concrete girders, the longest ever made at construction time.

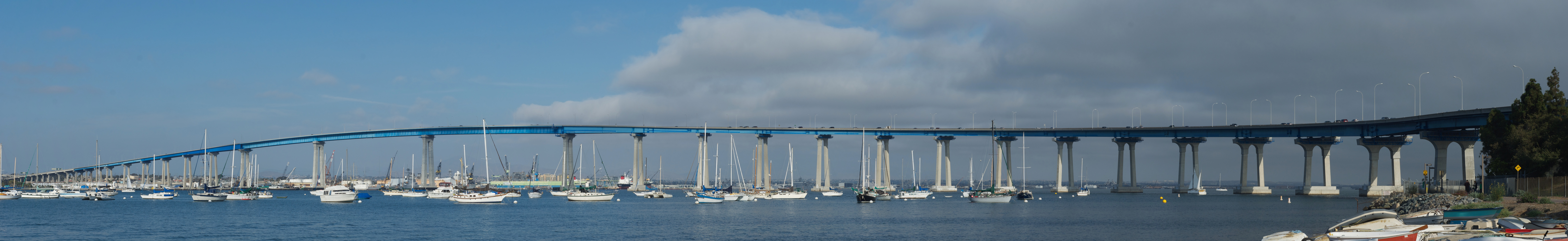
A daytime panorama of the bridge.

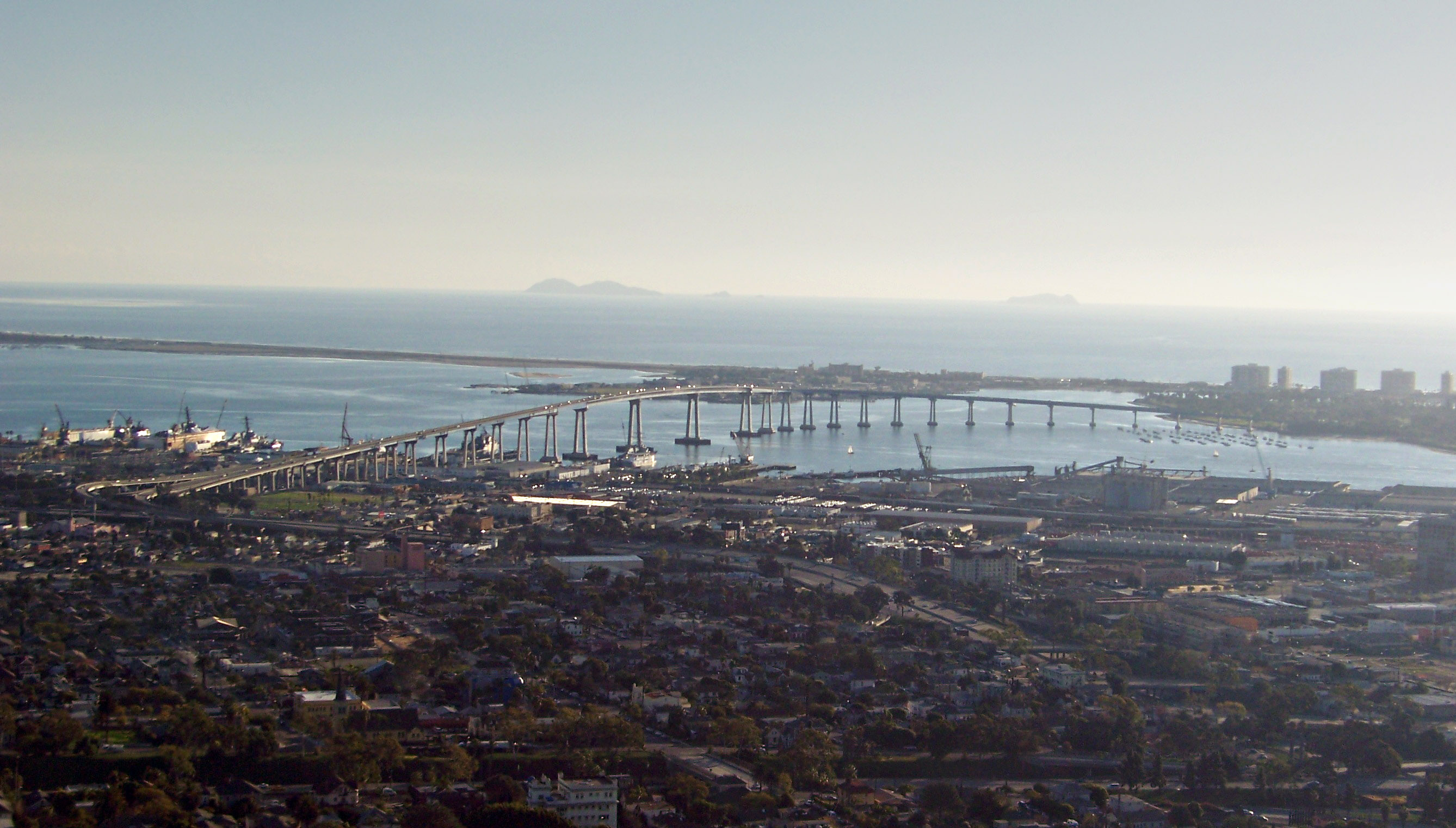
A view of the bridge from a commercial jet

In 1970, it won an award of merit for a long-span bridge from the American Institute of Steel Construction. The five-lane bridge featured the longest continuous box girder in the world until it was surpassed by the Shibanpo Yangtze River Bridge in Chongqing, China, in 2008. The bridge is the third largest orthogonal box in the country – the box is the center part of the bridge, between piers 18 and 21 over the main shipping channel.

=== Tolls and tollbooths ===
When the bridge opened in 1969, a toll of 60 cents was charged in each direction (equivalent to $5.27 in 2025). In 1980, the toll became $1.20 (equivalent to $4.69 in 2025), charged only in the westbound direction towards Coronado. The toll then dropped to $1 in 1988 (equivalent to $2.72 in 2025). Although the bridge was supposed to become "toll-free" once the original bridge bond was paid (which occurred in 1986), the tolls continued until 10 p.m. on June 27, 2002, after the San Diego Association of Governments decided to stop collecting tolls. It became the last toll bridge in Southern California to discontinue tolls, despite objections from some residents that traffic to Coronado would increase. Drivers paid a total of $197 million throughout the years.

Traffic barriers along Third Street to block traffic from turning onto intersecting streets were removed in November 2004, following voter approval. The speed limit was then decreased to 25 miles per hour (40 km/h) in October 2005 along Third and Fourth streets, after traffic increased by 20 percent following the removal of the tolls. The islands upon which the toll booths sat, as well as the canopy over the toll plaza area, are still intact, located at the western end of the bridge in the westbound lanes. Though tolls are no longer collected, beginning February 19, 2009, there was talk of resuming westbound toll collection to fund major traffic solutions and a tunnel. However nothing came of those discussions, as well as 2011 discussions of removing the unused toll plaza completely.

=== Lanes and traffic ===
The bridge contains five lanes: two eastbound, two westbound, and a reversible middle lane with a barrier transfer machine system installed in 1993, which can be used to create a reversible lane in either direction in response to traffic volume. Before installation of the barrier, moveable cones were used to separate eastbound/westbound traffic. On December 7, 1981, Coronado resident Hal Willis was westbound when a drunk driver traveling eastbound at high speeds drove through the cones, hit him head-on, and caused his death. This incident began the process of implementing the barrier solution. The eastern end of the bridge connects directly to a T interchange with Interstate 5, just southeast of downtown San Diego. It is designated and signed as part of California State Highway 75. The bridge was designed entirely and exclusively for motor vehicle traffic; there are no pedestrian walkways, bike paths, or shoulders ("breakdown lanes"). Once a year, beginning in 1986, a lane was opened to pedestrians for the Navy Bay Bridge Run/Walk, a fundraiser sponsored by and benefiting the Navy Morale, Welfare, and Recreation program. Beginning in 2008, cyclists have the once-a-year opportunity to ride over the bridge in the Bike the Bay "fun ride".

=== Artwork ===
The pillars supporting the bridge on the eastern end are painted with huge murals as part of Chicano Park, the most extensive collection of Chicano art murals in the world. This neighborhood park and mural display were created in response to a community uprising in 1970, which protested the adverse effects of the bridge and Interstate 5 on the Barrio Logan community. Local artist Salvador Torres proposed using the bridge and freeway pillars as a giant canvas for Chicano art at a time when urban wall murals were rare in the United States, and he and many other artists created the murals when permission for the park was finally granted in 1973.

== Suicides ==
The Coronado Bridge is frequently used as a suicide bridge; as of July 2017, at least 407 suicide deaths by bridge jumpers have occurred on the Coronado bridge, trailing only the Golden Gate Bridge in San Francisco as the bridge most-often used for suicide in the United States. Solar-powered phones were once installed on the Skyway to offer direct help for those contemplating suicide, but have since been removed. Signs have been placed on the bridge urging potential suicides to call a hotline. However, call boxes are not provided.

After an accident in 2016, where a drunk driver drove a pickup truck off the bridge and into Chicano Park, killing 4 and injuring 9, state senator Ben Hueso proposed a state funding bill to cover safety measures on the Coronado bridge and require reports to the state legislature on progress. In February 2017, Caltrans announced its intent to perform a feasibility study for suicide-dissuasion options for the bridge. Hueso stated, "The safety of residents and visitors traveling on the bridge, and those who gather below it in Chicano Park, is of the utmost importance." On March 26, 2018, Caltrans released its report; it outlined suicide-dissuasion options such as netting, fencing, and glass barriers.

In 1972, three years after the bridge was opened to traffic, the first "suicide" was recorded. It was subsequently reclassified as a murder after an investigation determined that Jewell P. Hutchings, 52, of Cerritos had been forced to jump at gunpoint. Her husband, James Albert Hutchings, was subsequently charged with murder and pleaded guilty to involuntary manslaughter.

== Lighting ==
In April 1997, the Port of San Diego released an international call for artists seeking qualifications of artist-led teams interested in developing environmentally-friendly lighting concept proposals for the bridge. In 2010, a London-based design group led by Peter Fink was chosen. The winning concept envisages illuminating the bridge with programmable LED lighting in an energy-neutral manner using electricity generated by wind turbines. In 2012, two years after choosing Fink's project, the Port of San Diego cut a check for $75,000 to initiate fundraising in concert with the San Diego Foundation. The Port of San Diego says no taxpayer dollars will be used. Instead, they are relying on grants and private donations to fund this lighting project, which will ideally be complete by 2019 to coincide with the bridge's 50th anniversary. As of March 2014, the working target date was 2019. Three of the bridge's columns were illuminated from November 8 to November 14, 2020, as part of a lighting field test.

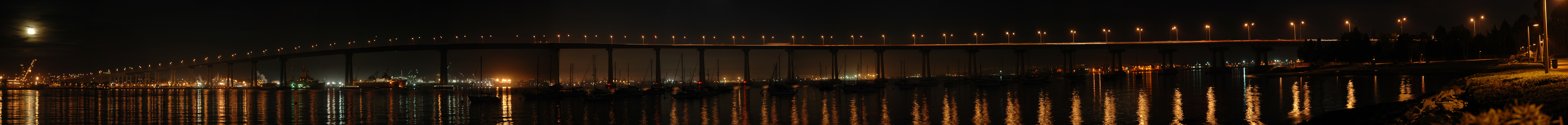
A night time panorama of the bridge.

== Urban legend ==
A decades-old local urban legend claims the center span of the bridge was engineered to float in the event of collapse, allowing Naval ships to push the debris and clear the bay. The myth may have developed due to the hollow box design of the 1,800-foot (550 m) center span, combined with the low-profile barges that made it appear to float on its own during construction. However, Caltrans and the bridge's principal architect, Robert Mosher, maintain that the legend is false.
