= Chicano Park =

Park in San Diego, California

Coordinates: 32°42′00″N 117°8′35″W

- Parque Chicano (Spanish)
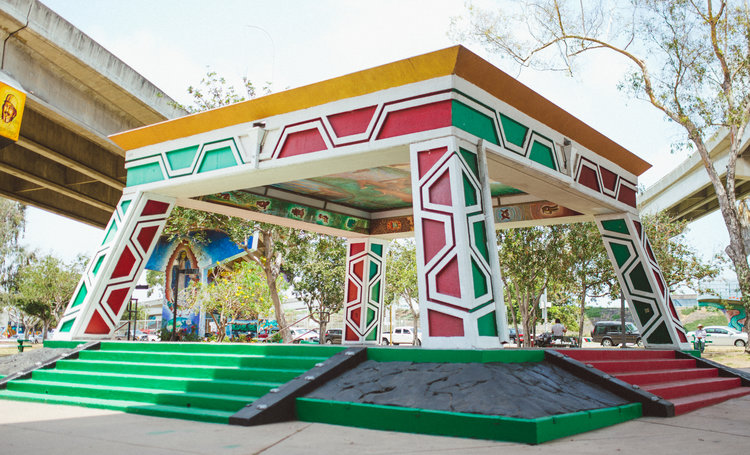
- The Chicano Park kiosko, designed by architect Alfredo Larín.
- Interactive map of Chicano Park
- Location: Logan Heights, San Diego, California
- Area: 7.9 acres (32,000 m^{2})
- Created: April 22, 1970
- Operator: Chicano Park Steering Committee
- Chicano Park
- U.S. National Register of Historic Places
- U.S. National Historic Landmark
- San Diego Historic Landmark
- NRHP reference No.: 12001192
- SDHL No.: 143

Significant dates
- Added to NRHP: January 23, 2013
- Designated NHL: December 23, 2016
- Designated SDHL: March 7, 1980

Chicano Park (Spanish: El Parque Chicano) is a 7.9 acres (32,000 m^{2}) park in Barrio Logan, a predominantly Chicano/Mexican American community in central San Diego, California. Located beneath the San Diego–Coronado Bridge, the park is home to the largest collection of outdoor murals in the United States, as well as various sculptures, earthworks, and an architectural piece dedicated to the cultural heritage of the community.

The park was designated an official historic site by the San Diego Historical Site Board in 1980, and its murals were officially recognized as public art by the San Diego Public Advisory Board in 1987. The park was listed on the National Register of Historic Places in 2013 owing to its association with the Chicano Movement, and was designated a National Historic Landmark in 2016.

Chicano Park, like Berkeley's People's Park, was the result of a militant (but nonviolent) people's land takeover. Every year on April 22 (or the nearest Saturday), the community celebrates the anniversary of the park's takeover with a celebration called Chicano Park Day.

== History ==
=== Origins ===
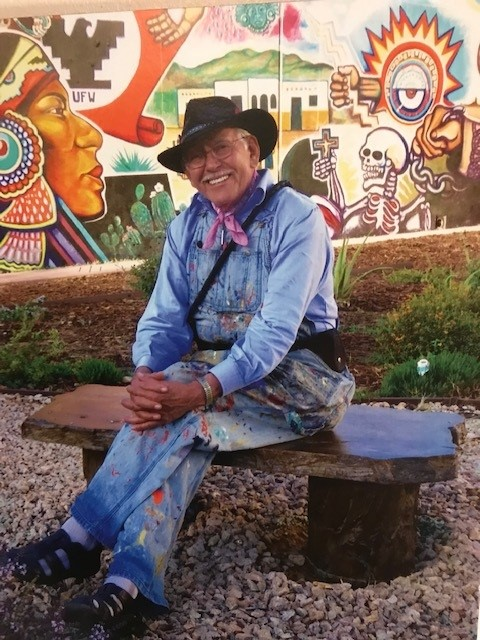
Muralist Salvador Torres is credited with envisioning the creation of Chicano Park.

The area was originally known as the East End, but was renamed Logan Heights in 1905. The first Mexican settlers there arrived in the 1890s, followed soon after by refugees fleeing the violence of the Mexican Revolution, which began in 1910. So many Mexican immigrants and Mexican-Americans settled there that the southern portion of Logan Heights eventually became known as Barrio Logan.

The original neighborhood reached all the way to San Diego Bay, with waterfront access for the residents. This access was denied beginning with World War II, when Naval installations blocked local access to the beach. The denial of beachfront access was the initial source of the community's resentment of the government and its agencies.

This resentment grew in the 1950s, when the area was rezoned as mixed residential and industrial. Junk dealers and repair shops moved into the barrio, creating air pollution, loud noise, and aesthetic conditions unsuitable for a residential area. Resentment continued to grow as the barrio was cleaved in two by Interstate 5 in 1963 and was further divided in 1969 by the elevated onramps of the San Diego–Coronado Bridge.

The seal of the Chiano Park movement, showing Aztlán highlighted in red.

At this time, Mexicans were accustomed to not being included in discussions concerning their communities and to not being represented by their officials, so no formal complaint was lodged. This attitude began to change as the Civil Rights Movement unfolded in parallel with park development efforts. As various community campaigns coalesced under the banner of the Chicano Movement, so too did the political awareness and sense of empowerment grow in Barrio Logan.

The Chicano Movement developed to support Mexican-American rights, including the right to organize and collectively bargain, led by César Chávez and Dolores Huerta of the United Farm Workers, the rights to the full benefits guaranteed to veterans, led by Dr. Hector P. Garcia of the American G.I. Forum, the right to equal and pertinent education, led by the student group MEChA which issued the Plan de Santa Barbara, for the rights of Mexicans guaranteed under the Treaty of Guadalupe Hidalgo, (especially land grants and bilingual education) under Reies Tijerina, and for recognition of the historic contributions of Mexican-Americans and the validity of Mexican culture.

Community residents had long been demanding a park. The City Council had promised to build a park to compensate for the loss of over 5,000 homes and businesses removed for the construction of the freeway and bridge, as well as for the aesthetic degradation created by the overhead freeways supported by a forest of gray concrete piers. In June 1969, the park was officially approved and a site was designated, but no action was taken to implement the decision.

=== The takeover ===
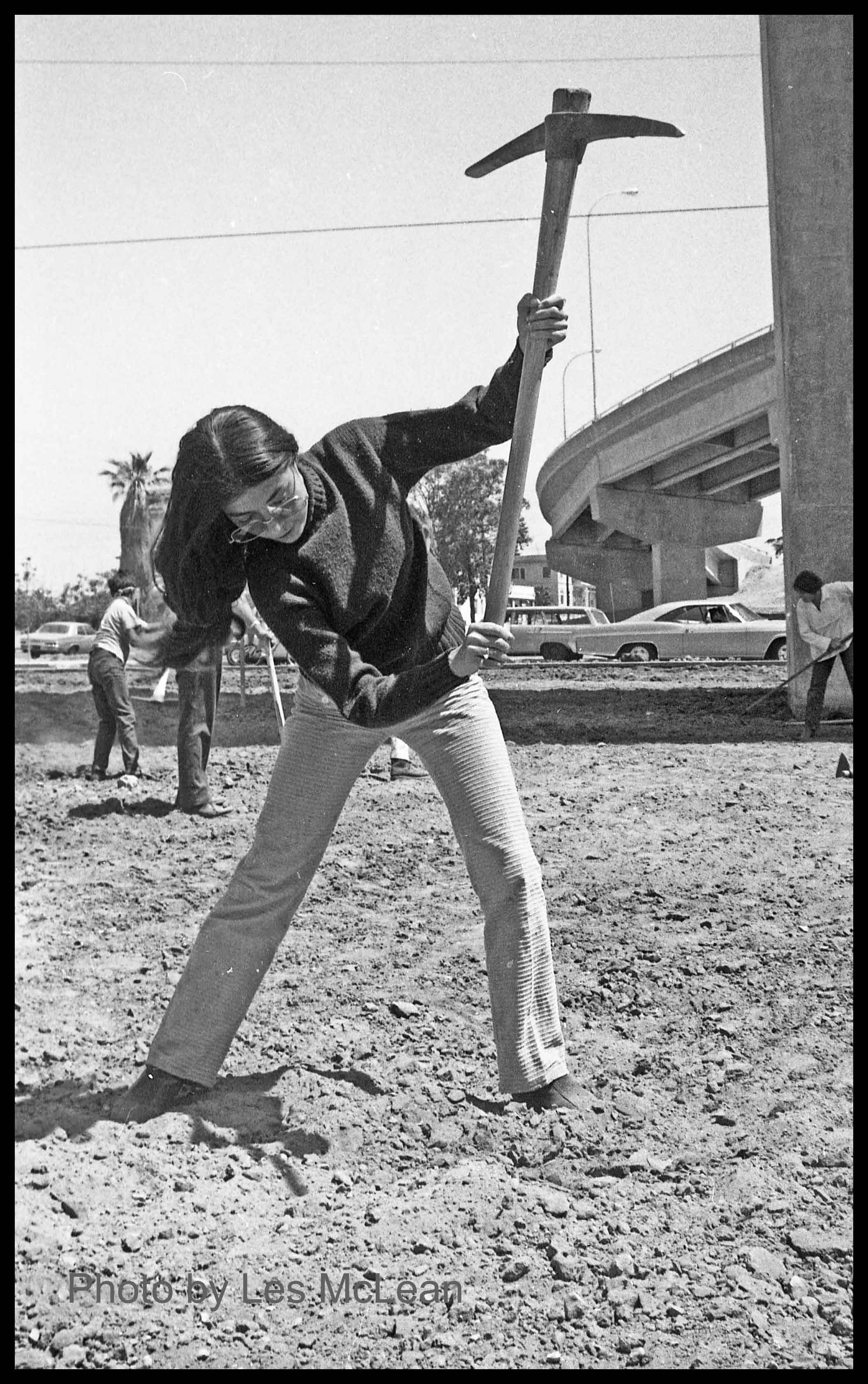
Chicana activist breaking ground on the park in 1970.

The final straw came on April 22, 1970. On his way to school, a community member, San Diego City College student and Brown Beret member named Mario Solis noticed bulldozers next to the area designated for the park. When he inquired about the nature of the work being undertaken, he was shocked to discover that, rather than a park, the crew was preparing to build a parking lot next to a building that would be converted into a California Highway Patrol station.

Solis went door-to-door to spread the news of the construction. At school, he alerted the students of Professor Gil Robledo's Chicano studies class, who printed fliers to bring more attention to the affair. At noon that day, Mexican-American high school students walked out of their classes to join other neighbors who had already congregated at the site. Some protesters formed human chains around the bulldozers, while others planted trees, flowers, and cactus. Solis is reported to have commandeered a bulldozer to flatten the land for planting. Also, the flag of Aztlán was raised on an old telephone pole, marking a symbolic "reclamation" of land that was once Mexico by people of Mexican descent.

There were many young people and families at the protest. When the crowd grew to 250, construction was called off. The occupation of Chicano Park lasted for twelve days while community members and city officials held meetings to negotiate the creation of a park. During that time, groups of people came from Los Angeles and Santa Barbara to join the occupation and express solidarity. The Chicano Park Steering Committee was founded by Josephine Talamantez, Victor Ochoa, Jose Gomez, and others.

Not trusting the city and fearing that abandoning the land would be tantamount to conceding defeat, an agreement was finally reached and the Steering Committee called for an end to the occupation of the land while stationing informal picketers on the public sidewalks around the disputed terrain to provide residents with information regarding the project. They maintained that the park would be re-occupied if negotiations failed.

At a meeting on April 23, a young artist named Salvador Torres, recently returned to the barrio from the College of Arts and Crafts in Oakland, shared his vision of adorning the freeway support pillars with beautiful artworks and a green belt with trees and other vegetation that would stretch all the way to the waterfront. For this reason, he is sometimes referred to as "the architect of the dream." Finally, on July 1, 1970, $21,814.96 was allocated for the development of a 1.8 acre (7,300 m^{2}) parcel of land.

=== Park establishment ===
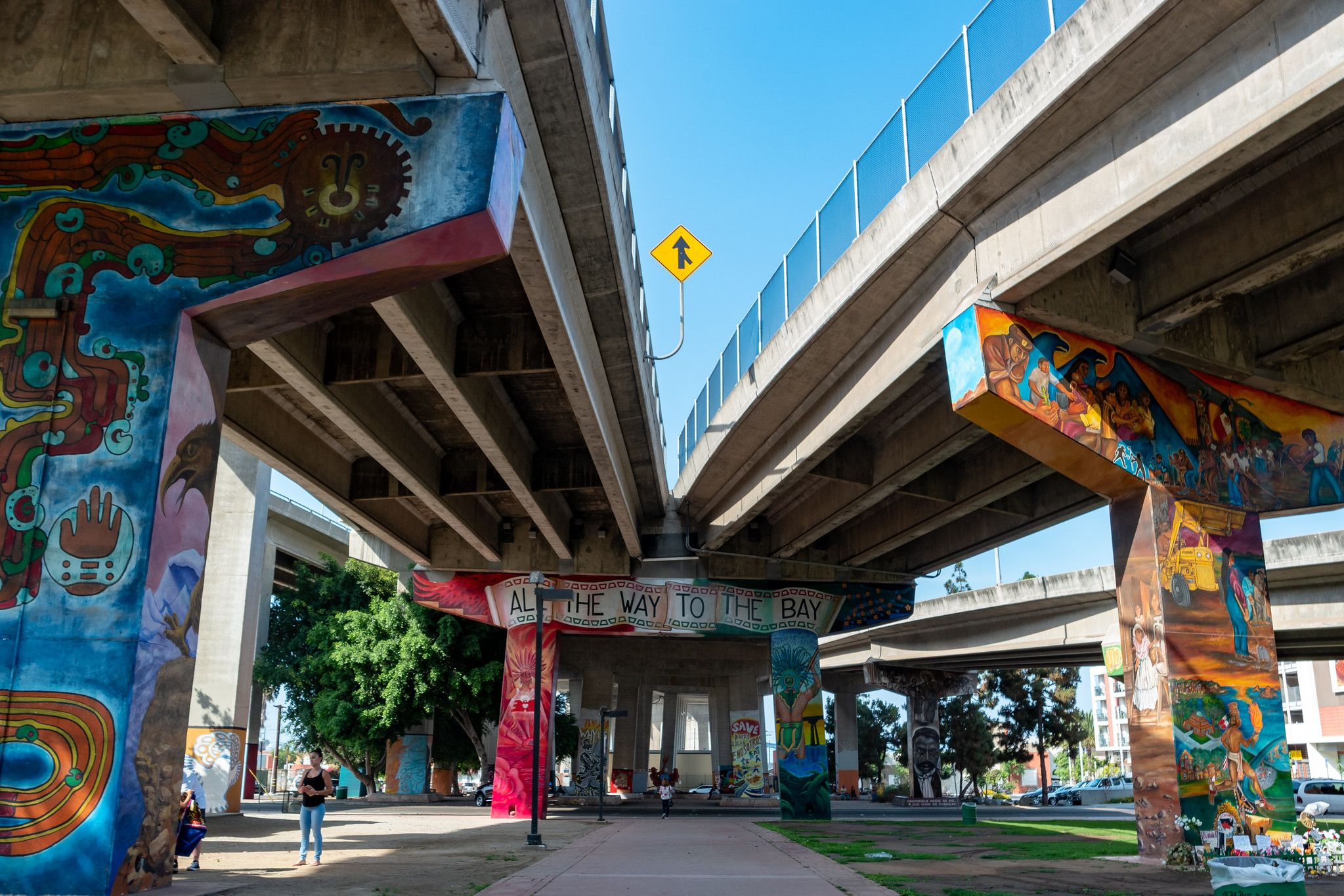
A mural celebrating the "All The Way To the Bay" campaign which saw the park expanded to its current boundaries.

While the creation of the park was actually begun on the day of the takeover, with minor landscaping improvements being undertaken by the occupiers, the murals that brought the park to prominence were not begun until 1973. Adding unplanned murals and splashes of color started in 1970, with Guillermo Aranda, Mario Acevedo, Victor Ochoa, Tomas Castaneda and others working on the freeway retaining walls and pylons.

With few exceptions, the artists and their organizations raised the money necessary to purchase muriatic acid to wash the columns, rubber surface conditioner to prepare them, and paints. Victor Ochoa, a founding member of the Chicano Park Steering Committee, recalls that on March 23, 1973, he brought 300 brushes and there were nearly 300 people helping to paint all weekend. The Centro Cultural de la Raza in San Diego's Balboa Park served as a training area for many of the muralists.

Many non-Chicanos also participated including Anglo artist, Michael Schnorr. Eventually a core of about 16 artists were dedicated to finishing the murals with many well-known Chicano artists and groups participating, such as members of the Royal Chicano Air Force. Over time, more vegetation was planted to create a cactus garden.

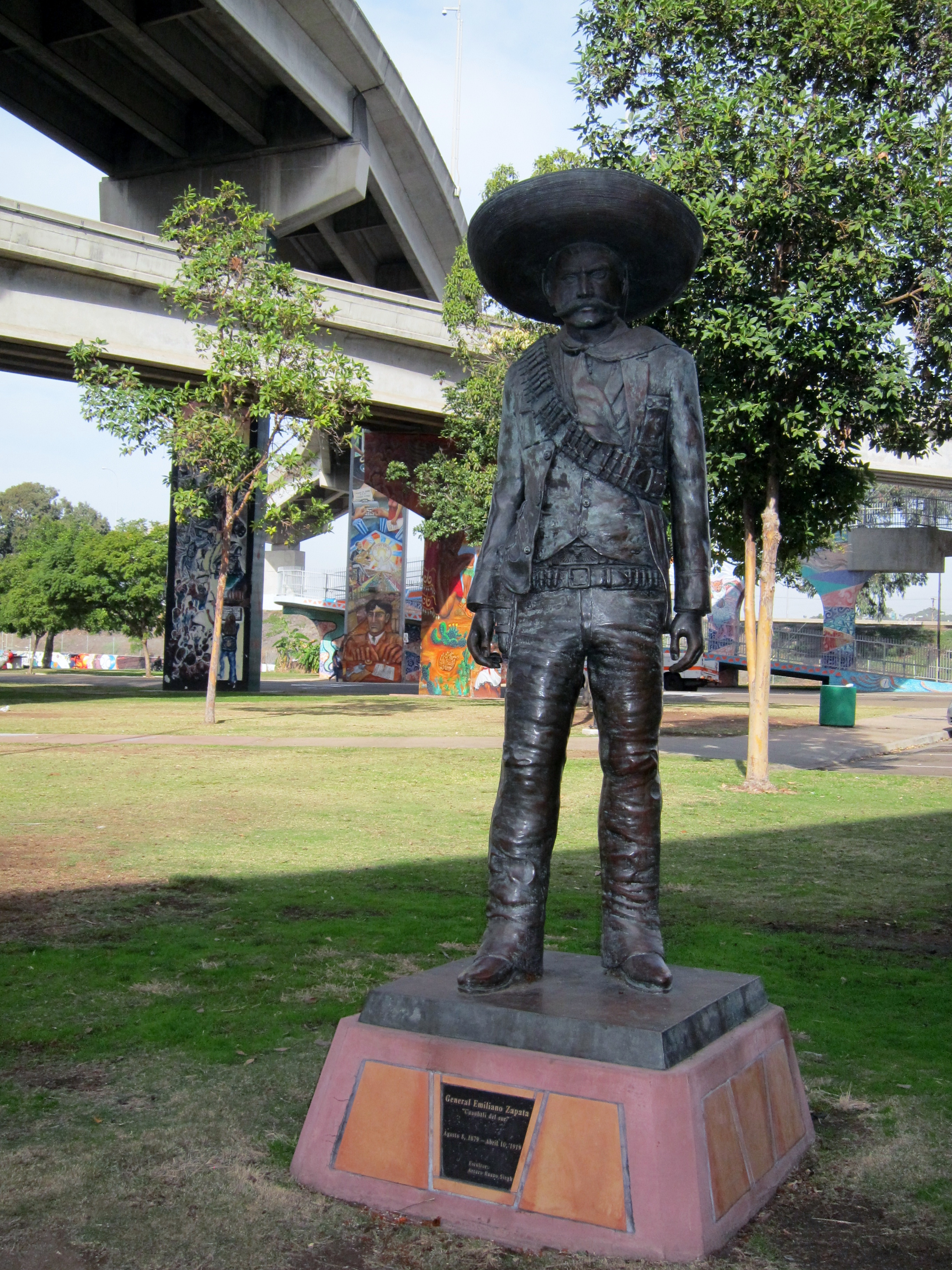
The Statue of Emiliano Zapata, honoring the famed leader of the Mexican Revolution.

The first group of murals took nearly two years to complete. The murals at Chicano Park act as a way to transmit the history and culture of Mexican-Americans and Chicanos. Murals have many themes including addressing immigration, feminist concerns and featuring historical and civil rights leaders.

In 1978, there was a "Mural Marathon" which took place from April 1 to April 22. During those twenty-one days, approximately 10,000 square feet of murals were painted.

Other additions to the park have been piecemeal, as the comprehensive "Master Plan" put forth by the artists was never adopted by the city. The park has expanded, and currently reaches almost "all the way to the bay", a phrase used as the rally cry to extend the park in a 1980 campaign. In 1987, the Cesar E. Chávez Waterfront Park began, and was completed in 1990, restoring beach access to the community. With the exception of three city blocks that are not part of the park, the original goal of creating a community park with waterfront access has been achieved.

In the mid-1990s, Caltrans decided to retrofit the San Diego-Coronado Bay Bridge to make it earthquake safe. Fearing that the murals would be damaged or destroyed, the community mobilized to stop the project to protect the murals from what they viewed as official insensitivity to the history and culture the murals represented. A compromise was reached whereby the murals would be boarded over with plywood to protect their surfaces from damage during the retrofitting process, and would be restored to their previous condition afterward.

=== Contemporary era ===
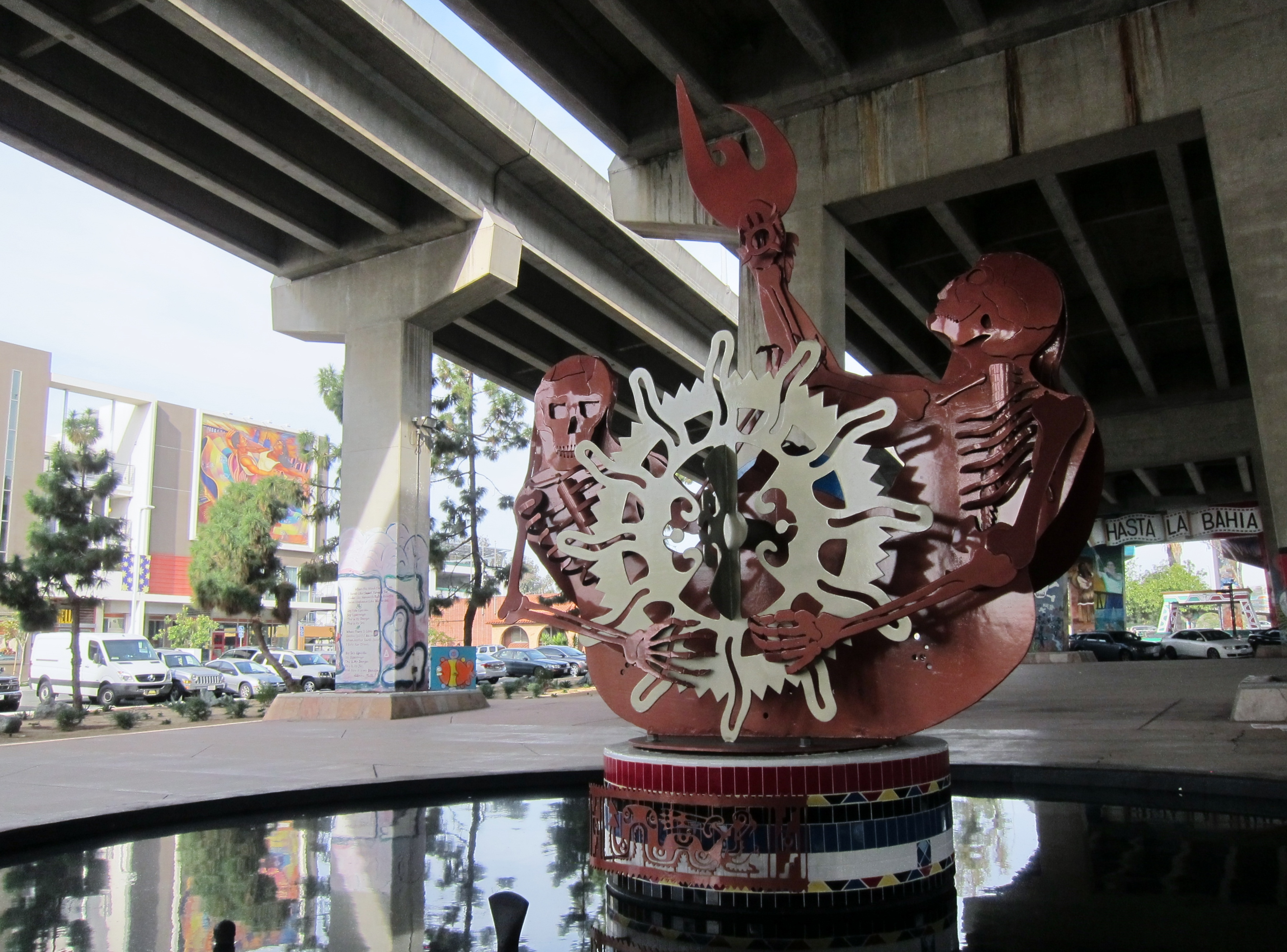
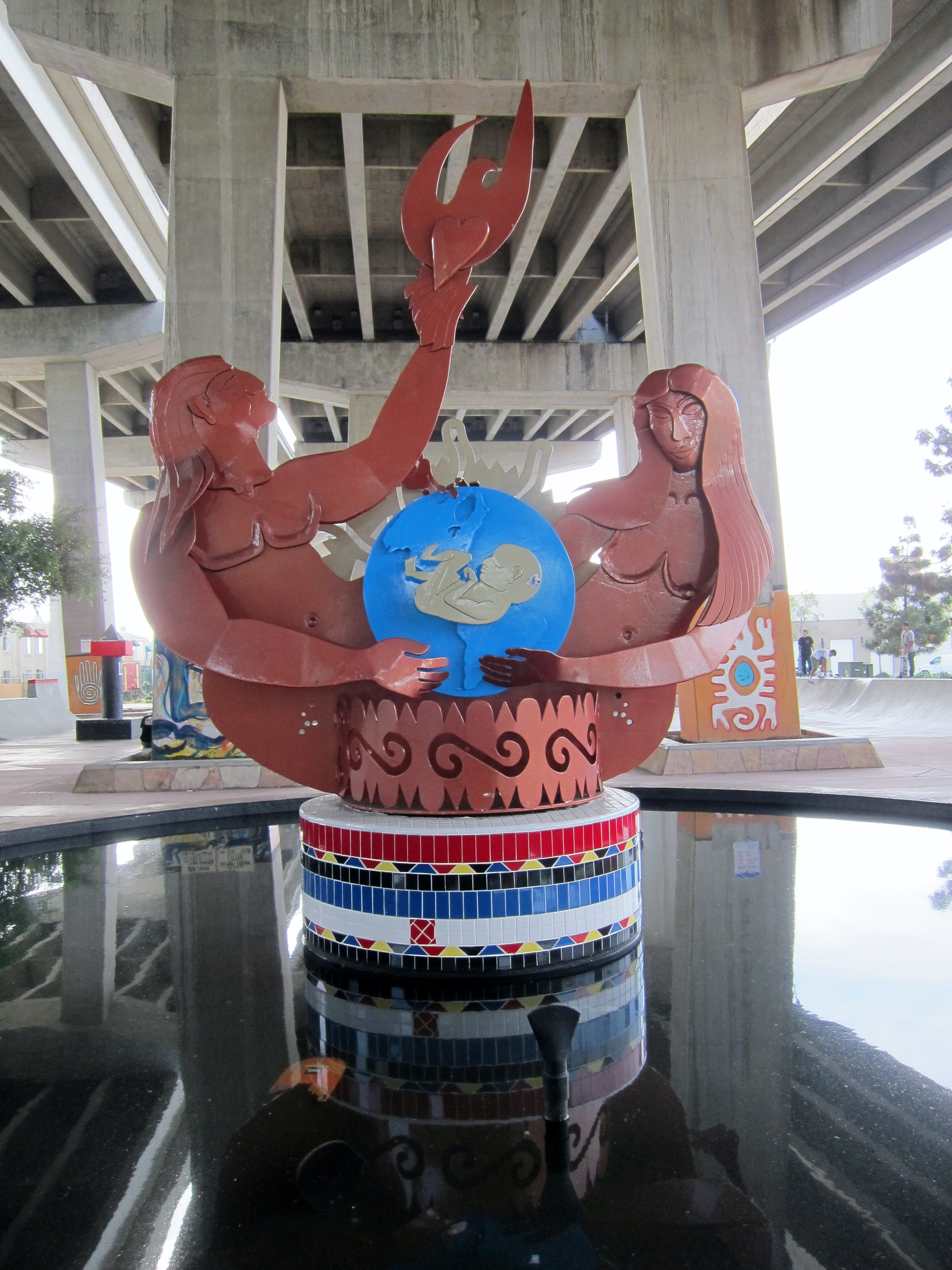
Chicano Park fountain, by San Diego artist Raúl Jáquez.

A 2003 plan to renovate the park was stalled when Caltrans objected to the word "Aztlán", which for years had been spelled out in rocks on the park's grounds. Calling the term "militant", they claimed that using federal funding for the project would violate Title VI of the Civil Rights Act of 1964 by showing preference to Mexicans and Mexican Americans. Caltrans district director Pedro Orso, after consultations with civil rights experts from within the agency and from the Federal Highway Administration, decided that the word did not violate the law, and the $600,000 grant was allowed to go through.

Chicano Park was added to the list of National Historic Landmarks by Obama's Secretary of the Interior, Sally Jewell on December 23, 2016.

On September 3, 2017, Roger Ogden, leader of a far-right political action group under the name "Patriot Fire", organized a "Patriot Picnic" in the park as a protest against "anti-American" murals. Over 500 community members and supporters occupied the park to prevent the protest from taking place. Ogden and his supporters were escorted from the park for their protection by police.

On February 3, 2018, a second "Patriot Picnic" was organized by an anonymous group calling itself "Bordertown Patriots", with the intention of taking down the Aztlán flag in the park and replacing it with a U.S. flag. Numerous far-right figures, including Ogden and white nationalist Kristopher Wyrick, attempted to enter the park, but were prevented from entering the center of the park by hundreds of Barrio Logan residents and supporters occupying the central area. Instead, the police directed the protesters into a protected free speech zone in a peripheral area of the park to avoid a clash between the two groups. Four people were arrested in connection with the protest, including a man who urinated on a mural.

== Landmark status ==
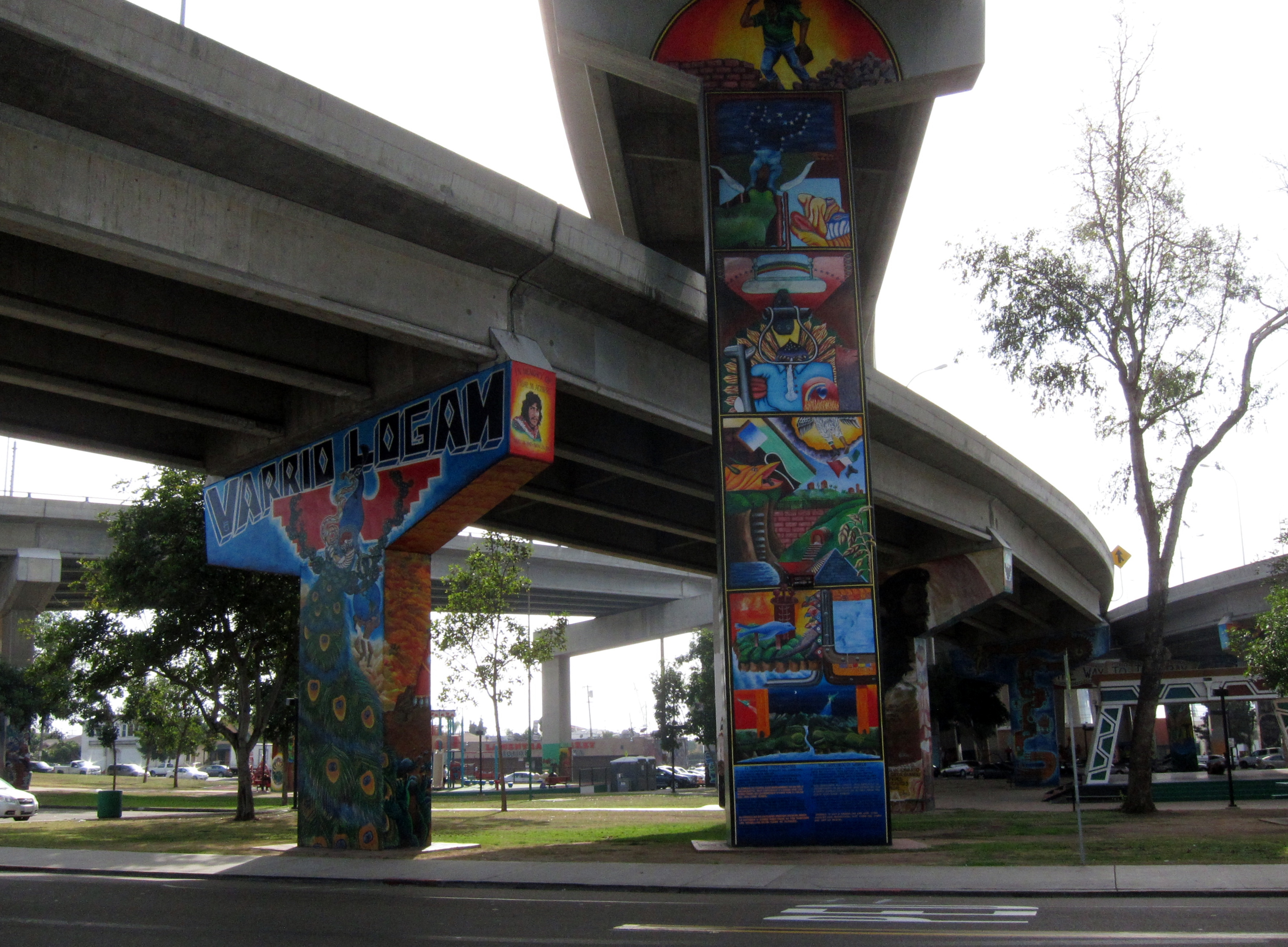
A panorama of Chicano Park.

Because of the magnitude and historical significance of the murals, the park was designated an official historic site by the San Diego Historical Site Board in 1980, and its murals were officially recognized as public art by the San Diego Public Advisory Board in 1987. Josephine Talamantez and Manny Galaviz submitted the proposal that successfully added Chicano Park to the National Register of Historic Places in 2013 due to its association with the Chicano Movement.

In 1997, Josephine Talamantez began the process of placing Chicano Park with its artwork and murals on the National Register in order to prevent the city of San Diego from damaging the murals while retrofitting Coronado Bridge. After years of work, Chicano Park was officially designated as a National Historic Landmark in December 2016. Talamantez helped lead the opening of Chicano Park Museum and Cultural Center inside a nearby city-owned building that used to house the Cesar Chavez Continuing Education Center.

== Museum ==
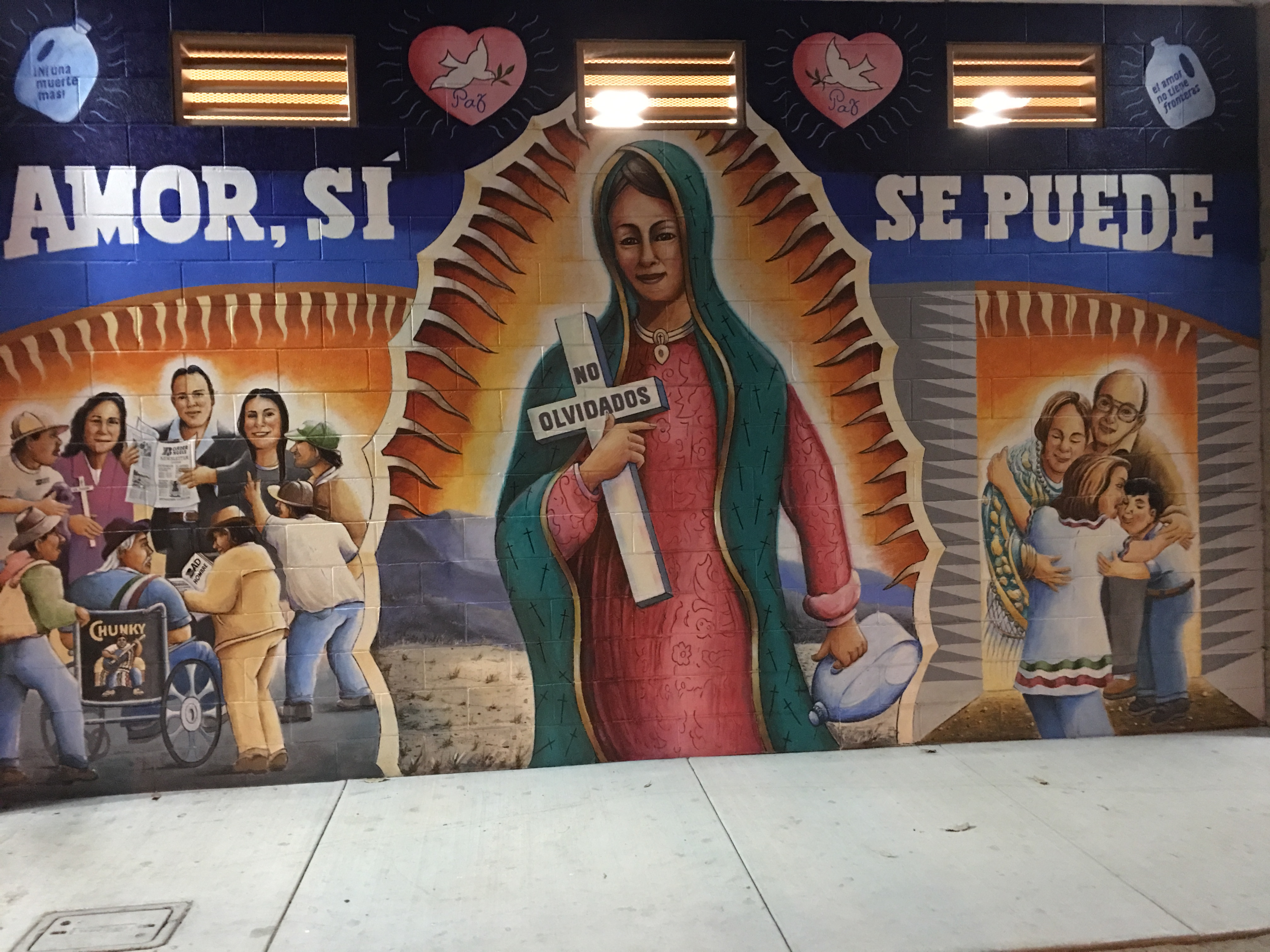
The Virgin of Guadalupe mural.

The Chicano Park Museum and Cultural Center in Logan Heights, San Diego, had its grand opening on October 8, 2022, with their pillar exhibit: Stories of Resilience and Self-Determination. Like the park, the museum is a communal space that often corporates and collaborates with other local non-profit organizations. Within the museum, there is a local artist gallery, where local Chicano artists are given the opportunity to represent and sell their artwork. There is a main exhibit space, an archival room, a community room and a gift shop. Inside of the Chicano Park Museum and Cultural Center's gift shop there are varieties of art pieces created by local California artists that guests are encouraged to browse or purchase.

The museum's first exhibition, which ran through September 9, 2023, highlighted the organizations or “elements of the heart of the Chicano Park Movement including: The Brown Berets, Centro Cultural de la Raza, the Chicano Park Steering Committee, Danza Azteca, Danza Folklorica, Kumeyaay Story, Lowriders, Música, Our Lady of Guadalupe Church, Teatro, Unión del Barrio, and the Youth. In addition, the exhibition will have an installation by Visionary Elder Artist Salvador “Queso” Torres.” The significance behind the exhibitions is the knowledge given to individuals about “Chicana/o, Latina/o, and Indigenous culture and history.” The exhibit was open to the community for more than a year.

The Chicano Park Museum lost an $8 million grant from the EPA that was designated for a community microbus project. The "Via Verde" project was designed to provide free, on-demand, bilingual electric vehicle transit across the fractured Barrio Logan and Logan Heights neighborhoods, connecting residents to essential services. The grant was unilaterally canceled by the Trump administration, despite prior congressional approval. The community is now attempting to find alternative ways to secure the necessary $8 million in funding. In the meantime, the Chicano Park Museum will host a gathering for artists and community members to honor the space and the art, stories, and heritage it strives to preserve.

== Murals ==
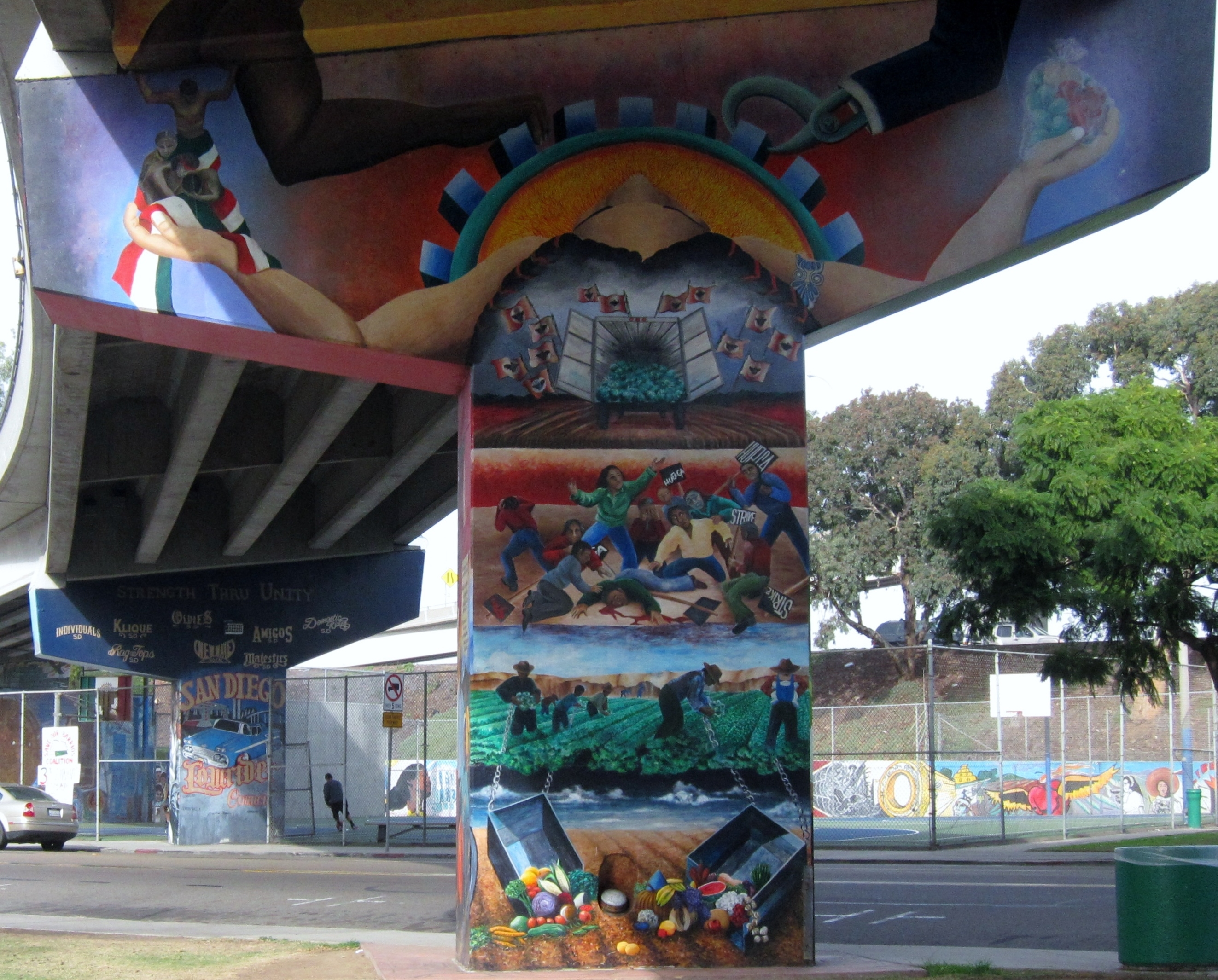
A mural honoring the United Farm Workers.

Mural restoration projects began in 1984, and the murals have been restored almost continuously ever since. A large-scale restoration project took place in 2012 with many of the original artists returning to work on the art. Twenty-three murals were restored in all. Artists such as Victor Ochoa participated in the Chicano Park Mural Restoration Project, which lasted 13 months. Ochoa was widely known as one of the leaders in organizing local artists to paint murals at Chicano Park back in the 1970s. He is also the editor of an instruction manual on restoring the murals. The murals were fully restored by 2013 in time for the 43rd Anniversary Celebration.

On Jun 25, 2023, a new mural was unveiled on Barrio Logan, which honored the ruling of the Supreme Court of California in 1975 which banned “el cortito”. Mo Jourdane, an attorney with California Rural Legal Assistance, represented the farmworkers. "El corito" was a short-handed hoe that caused many farm workers to spend hours bent down, which later caused spinal issues. This mural honors the work and sacrifice of those working in the fields, depicting farmworkers. The mural was created by artists Mario Chacon, Ariana Arroyo, and Gary Hartbur.

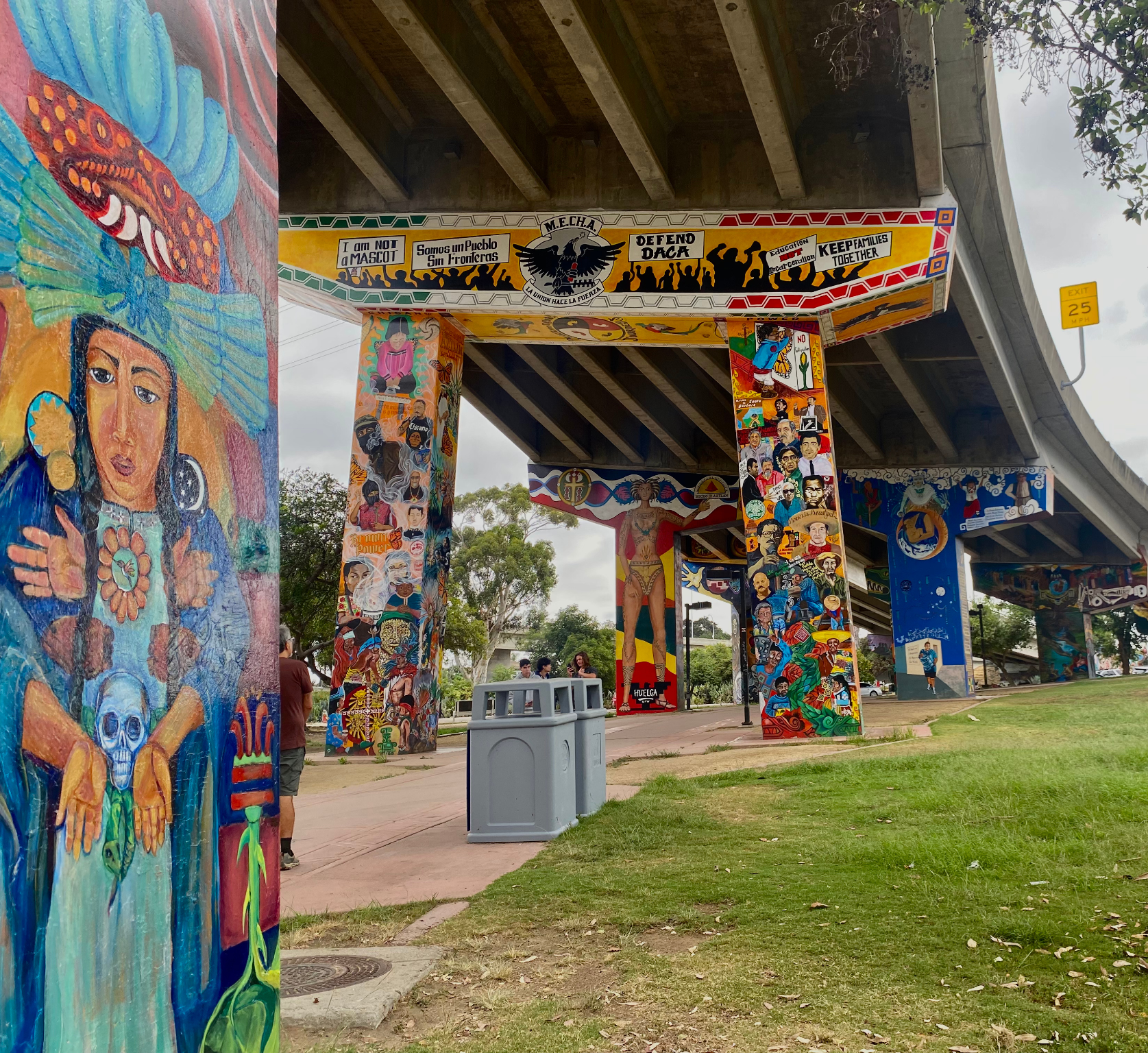
A row of murals decorating the pillars of the San Diego–Coronado Bridge.

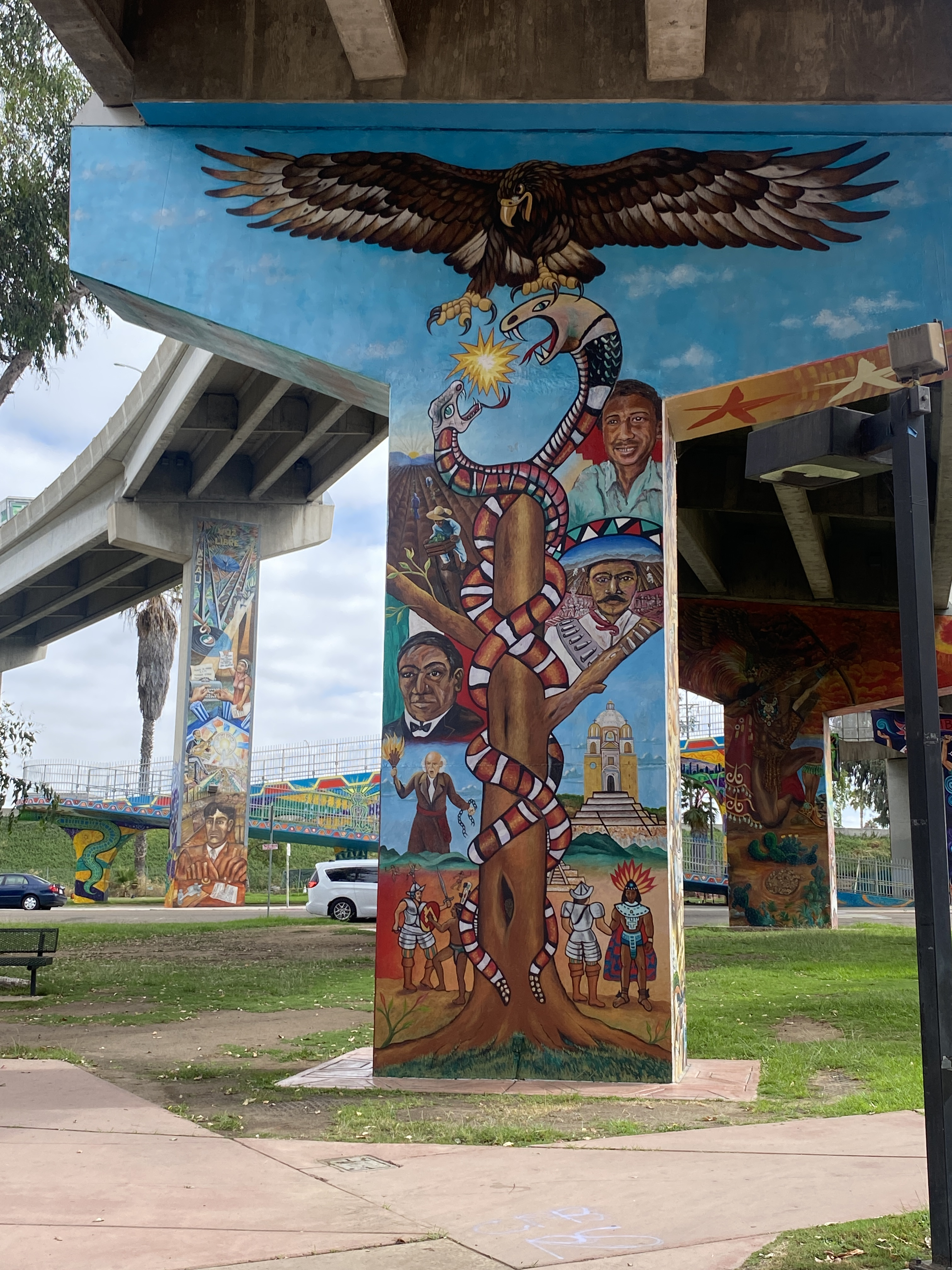
A 1978 mural depicting Benito Juárez, Emiliano Zapata, and Miguel Hidalgo y Costilla.

== Events ==
The park hosts many different events and groups throughout the year. Different groups who practice and perform Aztec dance use Chicano Park to prepare for ceremonies and other events.

Every year around April 22, Chicano Park marks an anniversary celebration to "celebrate the takeover of the area." The Park hosts traditional music as well as modern bands. Ballet folklorico, lowrider car exhibits and art workshops have also been a part of these celebrations.

- 40th Anniversary Theme: 40 Años de the Tierra Mia: Aquí Estamos y No Nos Vamos
- 43rd Anniversary Theme: Chicano Park: Aztlan's Jewel & National Chicano Treasure
- 44th Anniversary Theme: La Tierra Es De Quien La Trabaja: The Land Belongs To Those Who Work It...

== See also ==
- List of parks in San Diego
- Carmen Linares-Kalo
- Chicano murals
