= Centro Cultural de la Raza =

Non-profit organization

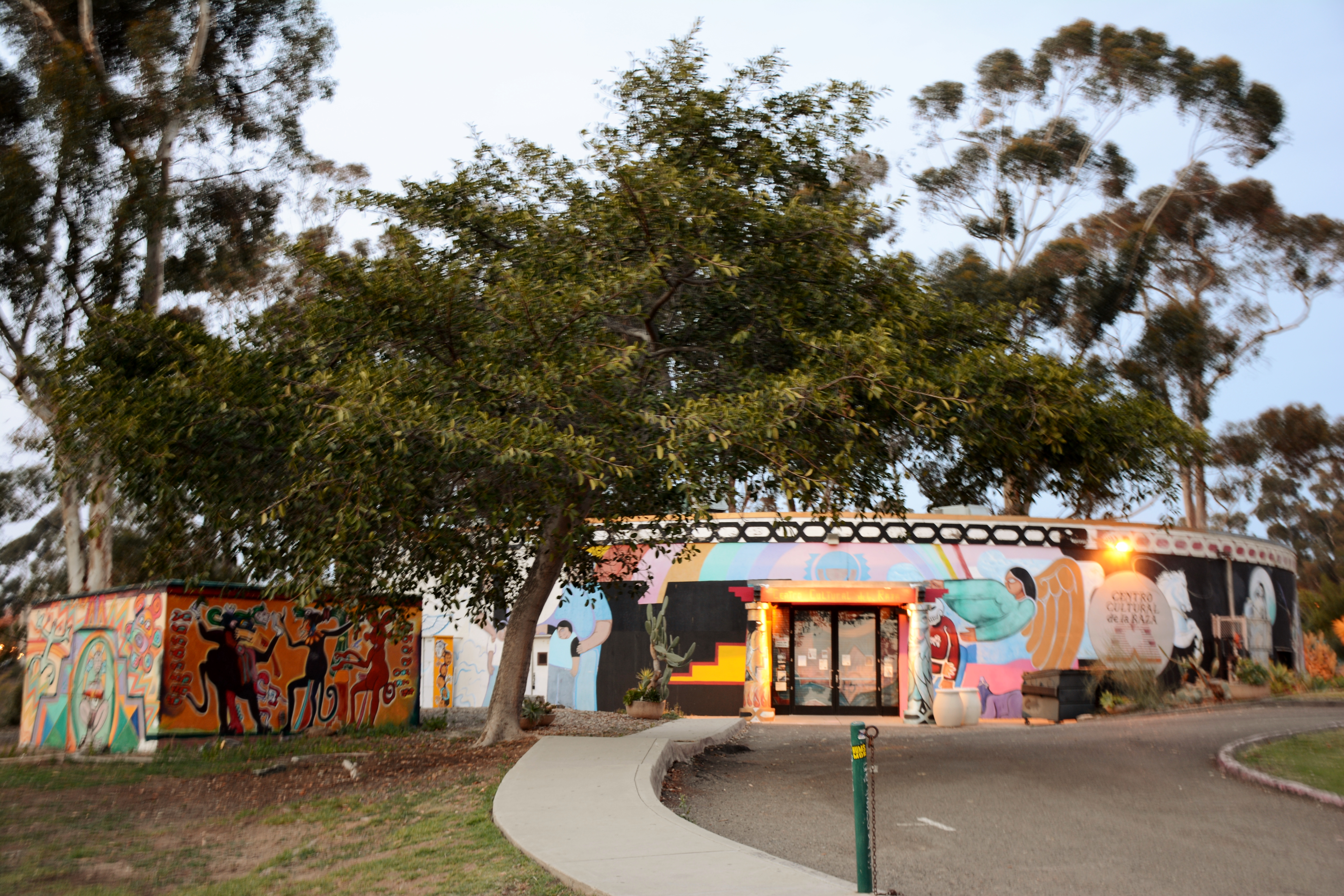
- Formation: 1970
- Headquarters: Balboa Park
- Location: 2004 Park Blvd. San Diego, CA 92101
- Coordinates: 32°43′40″N 117°08′55″W
- Region served: San Diego, California
- Board of directors: Roberto D. Hernández, Maria Figueroa, Ymoat Luna, Amelia Enrique, Jade Power Sotomayor, Ana Laura Martinez, Norell Martinez, Mario Aguilar, Esau Cortez
- Website: Official website

The Centro Cultural de la Raza (Spanish for Cultural Center of the People) is a non-profit organization with the specific mission to create, preserve, promote and educate about Chicano, Mexicano, Native American and Latino art and culture. It is located in Balboa Park in San Diego, California. The cultural center supports and encourages the creative expression “of the indigenous cultures of the Americas.” It is currently a member of the American Alliance of Museums.

The Centro provides classes and presentations on drama, music, dance, and arts and crafts, many of which have origins in Mexico and "Aztlán," a term used by Chicanos to indicate a return to a spiritual homeland and Indigenous traditions and knowledge systems. Programs include Danza Azteca, Teatro Chicano, film screenings, exhibits, musical performances, installation art, readings, receptions and other events. The Centro's resident Ballet Folklorico company, Ballet Folklorico en Aztlan, also operates a dance academy at the Center. In addition, the Centro is available as a meeting place for community groups and organizations.

The Centro's circular building has offices, workrooms, studios, and a theater. The performance space seats 150 people and has a 2,000 square foot art gallery. The Centro is one of the first community-based Chicano cultural centers and one of the largest in the Southwest. It is identifiable by a number of murals painted near the building's main entrance.

== History ==
The origins of the Centro go back to the mid 1960s. Social protests, such as anti-Vietnam war demonstrations and work of activists like Dolores Huerta and Cesar Chavez leading with the United Farm Workers had given rise to grass-roots community movements in San Diego. Those involved with social protest saw that there would also be a need for a community center that was run by Chicanos and for Chicanos. At San Diego State University, the Mexican American Youth Association (MAYA) was formed to recruit Chicano students to the university and make sure that they were able to complete their studies. This group, along with the Mexican American Liberation Art Front (MALAF) both recognized the need for a cultural center. In addition, MALAF also noticed that there were few places for Chicanos to exhibit their art. Alurista, a poet, and artists Guillermo Aranda and Salvador Roberto Torres, were all involved with MAYA, later to become M.E.C.H.A. and were very active in working towards both a cultural space as well as a space to create and show art. In 1968, the San Diego Parks and Recreation Department gave Torres permission to use the abandoned Ford Building in Balboa Park as a studio space for 6 months.

Torres invited other visual artists and eventually the Ballet Foklorico en Aztlán, a folkloric dance group led by the Enrique family to use the space. Those involved included Alurista, Ochoa and Torres as well as Guillermo Aranda, Ruben de Anda, Leticia de Baca, the Aguilar sisters, Tomas Castañeda, Mario Acevedo Torero, Luis Espinoza, Ricardo Gonzalez and Antonio Rivas. The Ford Building by 1969 was a "major center of activities for San Diego's Chicano artists." Other artists such as Guillermo Rosette and musicians such as the Trio Moreno became involved at this time. They formally named themselves "Los Toltecas en Aztlán" in order to be able to create a more solid group identity.

Los Toltecas en Aztlán wrote this as their founding principle: "The Tolecas en Aztlán shall be constituted of all those Chicano Artists dedicated to Human Truth and Chicano Beauty, which in our belief can only be lived up to through Mutual Self-Respect, Self-Determination in our endeavors, and the Self-Sacrifice of our individual differences for the sake of a Centro Cultural de la Raza where our indigenous ancestral spirit of brotherhood, justice and peace can flourish in contemporary Chicano Art Forms." Los Toltecas en Aztlán had forty members by 1970.

Plans were begun to convert the Ford Building into Centro Cultural de la Raza. First, Los Toltecas en Aztlán petitioned the city of San Diego to use the building to create a cultural center. The proposal for the Centro went before city council, to the current mayor, Frank Curran, and to other Chicano organizations and interested individuals in order to gain support. The city of San Diego, however, had begun making plans to turn the Ford Building into an aerospace museum. According to Ochoa, the city and the "establishment" were uncomfortable with what the Toltecas were doing in Balboa Park. He says, "At one time there was 300 cars outside the Ford Building -- all Mexicans. They never saw so many Mexicans in Balboa Park before."

At the same time that Los Toltecas en Aztlán were petitioning the city to create a cultural center, in another part of San Diego where there had once been a vibrant Hispanic barrio, citizens were occupying the former neighborhood and demanding the city turn the space into a park. Torres and other members of Los Toltecas en Aztlán were involved in this protest, calling the area Chicano Park. The Chicano Park protest and other issues became part of a new proposal, citing a great need to create Centro Cultural de la Raza. The new proposal was brought to the city by Alurista, Torres, and Aranda. Despite this, the city attempted to evict the artists from the Ford Building. Los Toltecas en Aztlán refused to leave. In October, the Chicano Federation of San Diego County became involved and helped Los Toltecas en Aztlán express their concerns to the city manager, Walter Hahn. Los Toltecas en Aztlán refused to leave the Ford Building until another site was given them for the center. Eventually the city offered to give them an abandoned water tank that was originally built in 1914. Alurista was largely responsible for the final negotiations which included use of the new facility and a city contribution of $22,000 to the new building. The monetary contribution from the city included improvements to the building such as installing lights, heaters, water and a wood floor for the Ballet Folklorico.

Los Toltecas en Aztlán moved into the new building in May 1971 and worked hard to get the building ready for a grand inauguration on July 11, 1971. The grand opening ceremonies attracted over 500 people and included music, dance and an art exhibition inside the building.

The first mural "La Dualidad" in the new Centro building was created by Aranda and a team of volunteers and was completed in 1984. Outside of the building are murals by Mario Aguilar, Aranda, Barajas, Arturo Roman, Neto del Sol, David Avalos, Antonio de Hermosillo, Samuel Llamas, Antonio Perez and Ochoa.

The Centro was known internationally as a dynamic cultural center where academics such as Shifra Goldman, Tomas Ybarra Frausto and Chon Noriega could be found conversing with community members as well as artists such as Magu, Luis Valdez, Judy Baca, Sergio Arau, Lalo Guerrero, Jose Montoya, Barbara Carrasco, Gabino Palomares and El Vez. Groups that formed through the work of the Centro include: Ballet Folklórico en Aztlán, founded by Herminia Enrique; Treatro Meztizo and Trio Moreno, a musical group, BAWTAF (The Border Arts Workshop/Taller de Arte Fronterizo). In addition countless artists, musicians, performers, writers, dancers and activists were nurtured at the Centro, including Culture Clash, Gronk, Guillermo Gomez Peña, Lalo Lopez Alcaraz, the Taco Shop Poets, Yareli Arizmendi, James Luna, David Avalos, Dora Areola, Chicano Secret Service, Richard A. Lou, Robert J. Sanchez, and Isaac Artenstein - all of whom have achieved prominence in the arts and culture community.

== Boycott ==
A seven-year boycott (2000–2007) of the center was carried out by many artists, supporters, community members and even one of the founders, Ochoa. The dispute left the Centro in a "tenuous state." Disagreements with changes made by new administrators of the Centro caused the rift.

== Today ==
Cultural de la Raza helps people understand the border issues. It focuses on the center's mission to celebrate Chicano and Indigenous culture while promoting discussions about immigration and identity. The center plays an important role in the community by giving resources and educating people about the issue. In the article they talk about their latest exhibit called “Suturing the Border: Re-Membering BAW/TAF,” this exhibition recognizes the unique expressions of those who have lived in the region for years. The center is launching a two year project, borderlands vision to explore the rule of art in the community. The first exhibit focuses on the border art workshop. The exhibit highlights the need for communication between Mexicans and North Americans.

As a cultural center, the Centro not only promotes creative expression in art and formal art classes, but also includes in its busy schedule a variety of workshops in danza folklórica as well as other interpretive dance forms, music, theater, spoken word, drumming and more. In addition, numerous public presentations including exhibitions, concerts, installations, theater, dance, spoken word and multimedia events take place at the Centro.

In 2014, the Centro operated on a budget of $30,000 a year with no employees and only volunteers working for the organization.

The Centro Cultural de la Raza Archives from 1970-1999 are housed at the University of California, Santa Barbara (Collection: CEMA 12).

== Directors ==
1971-1975 Guillermo "Yermo" Aranda

1988-1990 Victor Ochoa
