= Memorial, San Diego =

Neighborhood in California, United States

- Community of San Diego
- Memorial
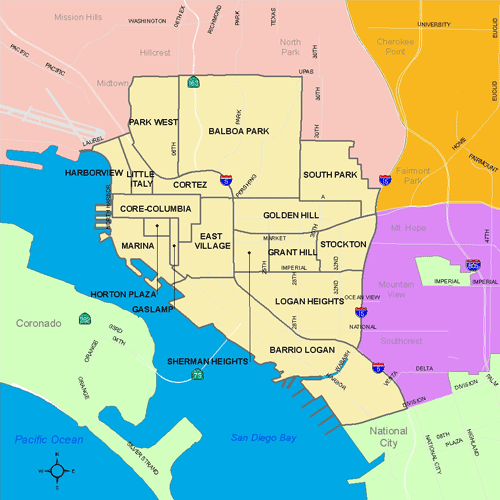
- Memorial is located in the central portion of the city of San Diego and part of the Southeastern Planning Area.

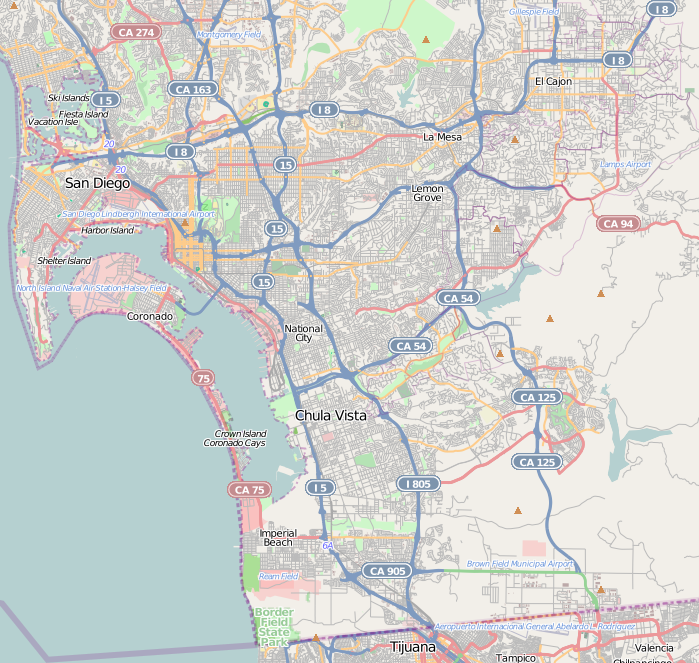
- Location within San Diego
- Coordinates: 32.7012°N 117.1295°W
- Country: United States of America
- State: California
- County: San Diego
- City: San Diego
- ZIP Code: 92113

Memorial is an urban neighborhood in the southeastern area of San Diego, California. It is generally bounded by Imperial Avenue to the north, California State Route 15 to the east, Interstate 5 to the south, and 28th Street to the west. Major thoroughfares in the neighborhood include Commercial Street, Oceanview Boulevard, and National Avenue. The San Diego Trolley runs through the area. Chollas Creek flows through the eastern edge of the neighborhood.

Neighboring communities include Logan Heights to the west, Grant Hill and Stockton to the north, Mountain View to the east, and Barrio Logan to the south.

Memorial is one of San Diego's oldest neighborhoods, with development beginning around 1850, although few structures from that time remain intact. The neighborhood holds a mix of residential, commercial, industrial, and recreational uses. Memorial Park is located within the boundaries of the neighborhood, which is known for a mural dedicated to peace, with the faces of Martin Luther King Jr., Rosa Parks, and Mahatma Gandhi.

Memorial is located within San Diego Unified School District, and is home to Memorial Junior High School and Logan Elementary School.
