= Sherman Heights, San Diego =

- Community of San Diego
- Sherman Heights
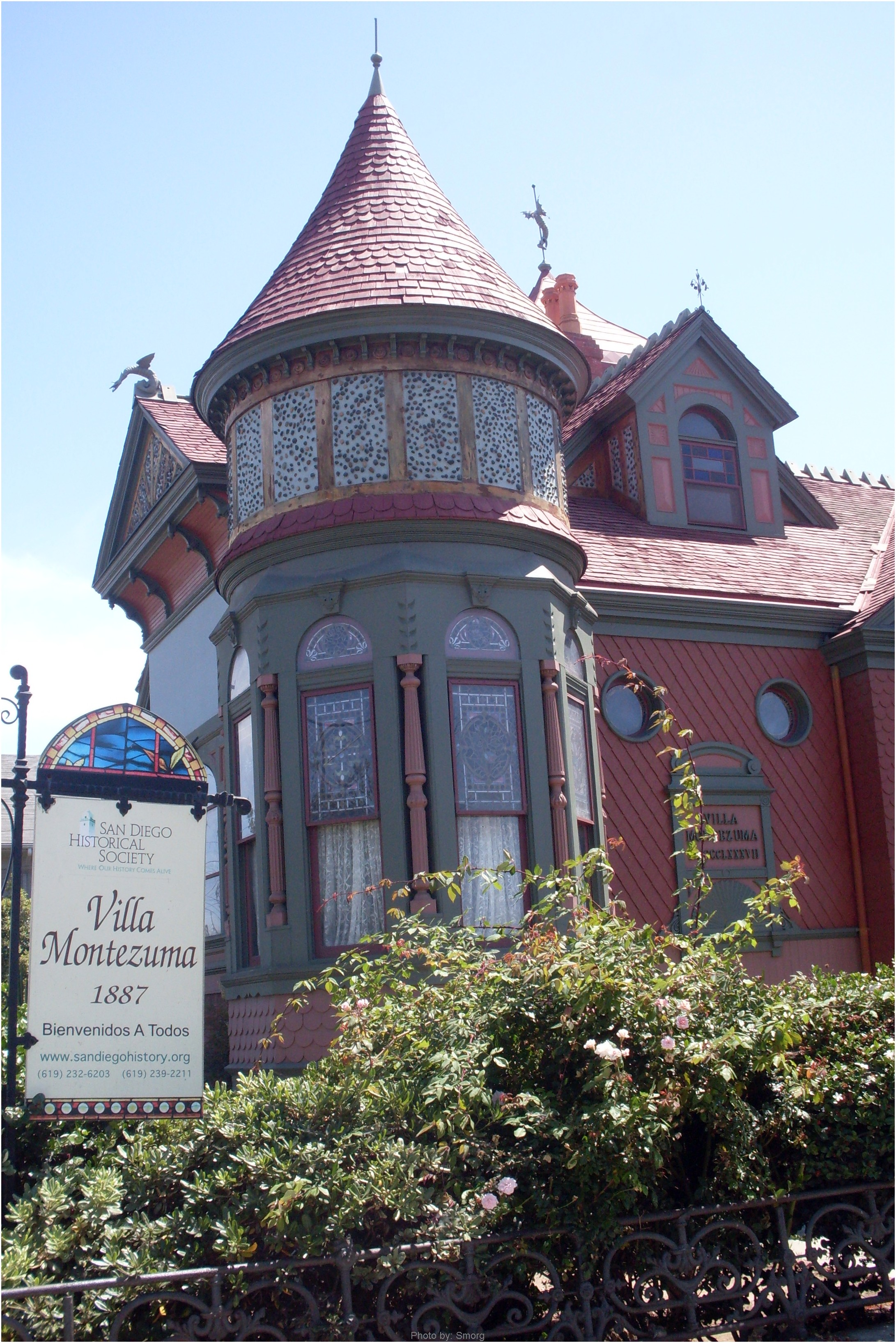
- Villa Montezuma, a historical place located in Sherman Heights

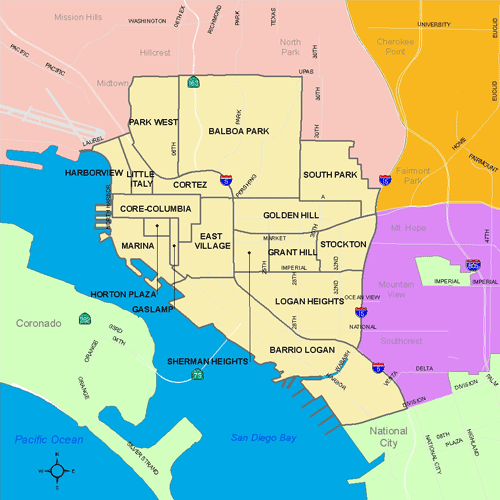
- Sherman Heights is located in the central portion of the city of San Diego and part of the Southeastern Planning Area.

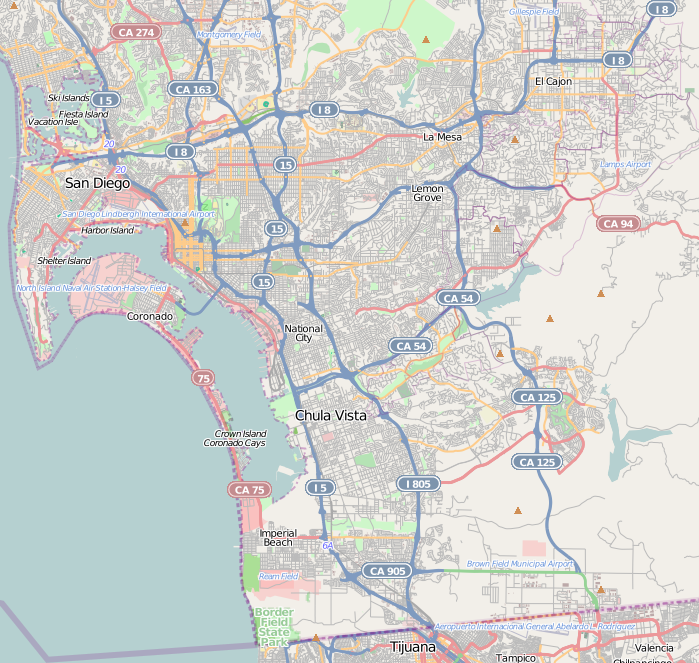
- Location within Southeast San Diego
- Coordinates: 32.423°N 117.083°W
- Country: United States of America
- State: California
- County: San Diego
- City: San Diego
- ZIP Code: 92102

Sherman Heights is an urban neighborhood in central San Diego, California, bordered by Golden Hill to the north, Grant Hill to the east, East Village to the west, and Logan Heights to the south. It is part of the Southeastern Planning Area.

The Sherman Heights neighborhood has the following roadways as boundaries: Martin Luther King Jr. Freeway to the north, 25th Street to the east, Imperial Avenue to the south, and Interstate 5 to the west.

== History ==
Sherman Heights takes its name from its original developer and later San Diego mayor Matthew Sherman, who purchased the land just east of downtown San Diego in 1867. Villa Montezuma, a large Victorian home built for musician and spiritualist Jesse Shepard in 1887, has been operated as a house museum, and is owned by the City of San Diego.

Sherman Heights has been the site of succeeding waves of immigrants to San Diego, beginning with Germans in the 1920s, Japanese through the 1940s, Africans through the 1970s, and Mexicans throughout the history of the city. The neighborhood has been designated a historic district by the City of San Diego.

== Demographics ==
Sherman Heights is a diverse neighborhood and home to one of the highest concentrations of Latinos in the city. Current demographics for the neighborhood are as follows: people of Hispanic/Latino heritage make up 75.6%, followed by non-Hispanic Whites at 16.4%, African-Americans at 4.1%, Asian at 1.8%, Mixed Race at 1.8% and others at 0.3%

== In popular culture ==
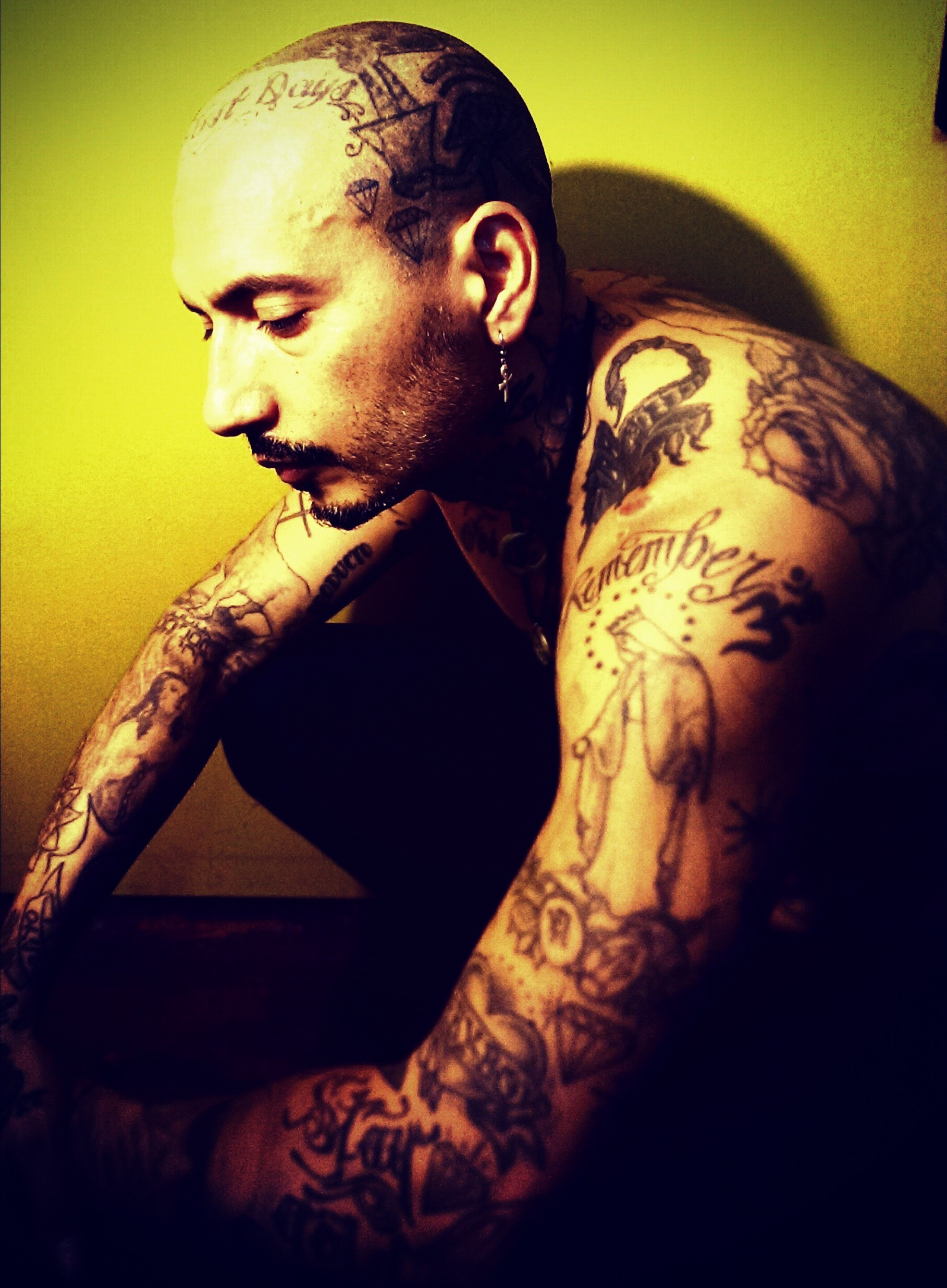
Sherman Heights native, singer and artist, Rafael Reyes (Leafar Seyer) of Prayers

Cholo Goth originated in Sherman Heights by electronic rock duo Prayers, which was founded by Sherman Heights native, Leafar Seyer, and Tijuana native, Dave Parley. Leafar Seyer (also known as Rafael Reyes) is a member of the Sherman 27th Street Grant Hill Park gang ("Sherman GHP"), a Sureño gang, and has earned levels of immunity and protection during their shows, one notably from rival gang areas like San Jose, a Norteño stronghold, due in part to the rival gang's mutual respect of the band's music and representation of Mexican culture.
