= Stockton, San Diego =

- Community of San Diego
- Stockton
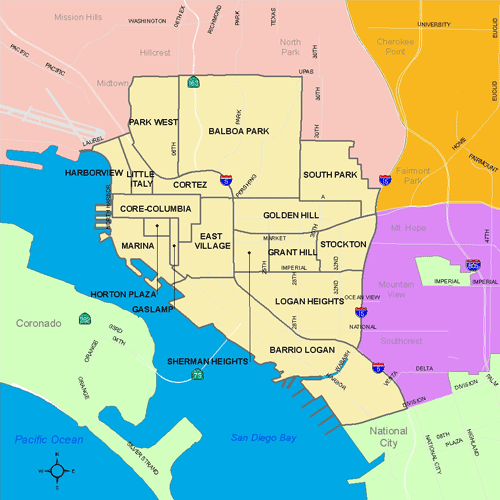
- Stockton is located in the central portion of the city of San Diego and part of the Southeastern Planning Area.

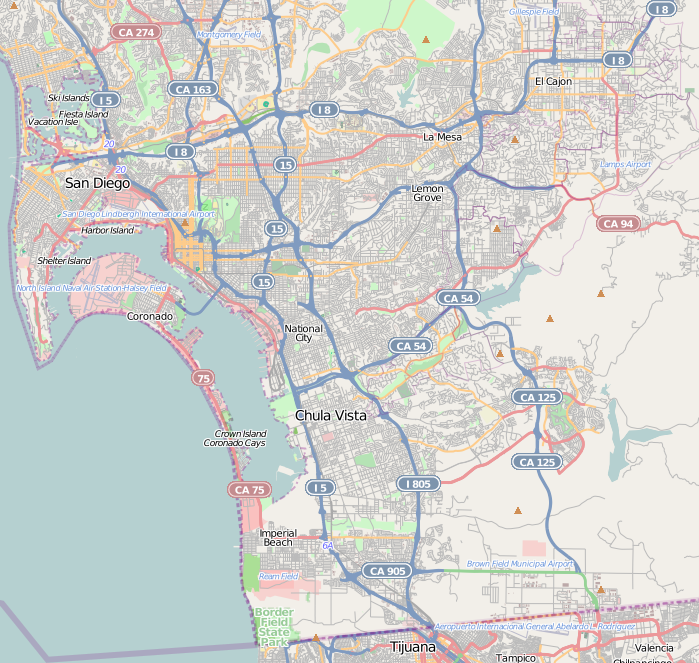
- Location within San Diego
- Coordinates: 32.7108°N 117.12475°W
- Country: United States of America
- State: California
- County: San Diego
- City: San Diego
- ZIP Code: 92102

Stockton is an urban neighborhood in central San Diego, California, bordered by Golden Hill to the north, Mountain View and Mt. Hope to the east, Grant Hill to the west, and Logan Heights to the south. I-15 forms the eastern boundary. It is part of the Southeastern Planning Area.

This area is named after Robert Field Stockton (1795–1866), a United States Navy commodore, active in the capture of California during the Mexican–American War. He was a naval innovator and an early advocate for a propeller-driven, steam-powered navy. Stockton was from a notable political family and also served as a U.S. Senator from New Jersey.

There was previously a Stockton Elementary, now renamed King-Chavez Academy Tk-5th.
