= Mountain View, San Diego =

- Community of San Diego
- Mountain View
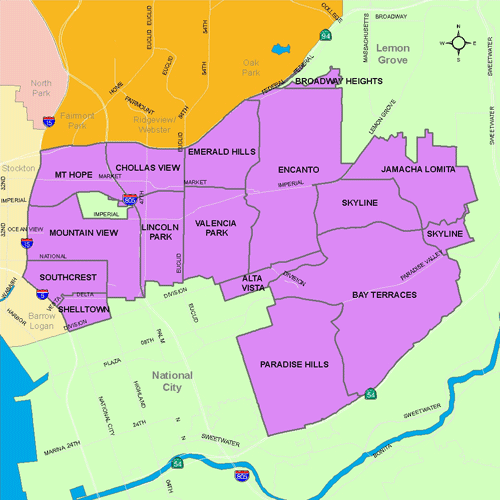
- Mountain View is located in the southeastern area of the city of San Diego

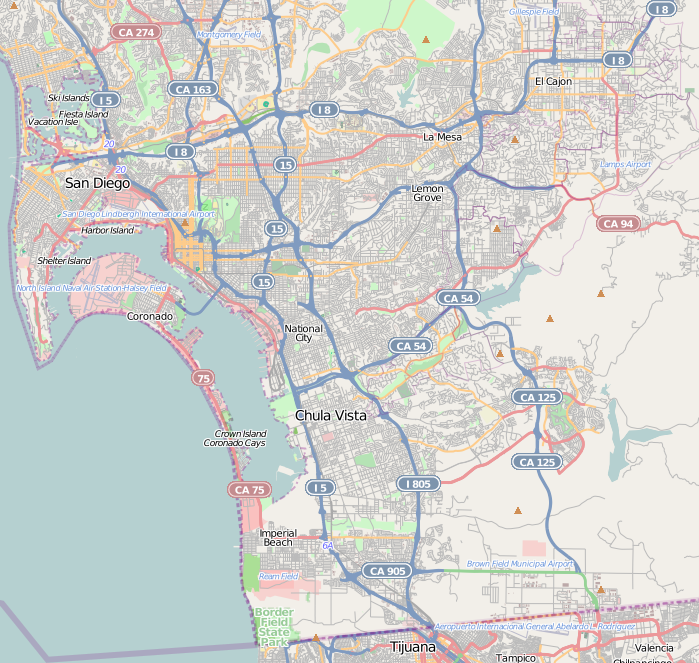
- Location within San Diego
- Coordinates: 32.7027°N 117.1118°W
- Country: United States of America
- State: California
- County: San Diego
- City: San Diego
- ZIP Code: 92113

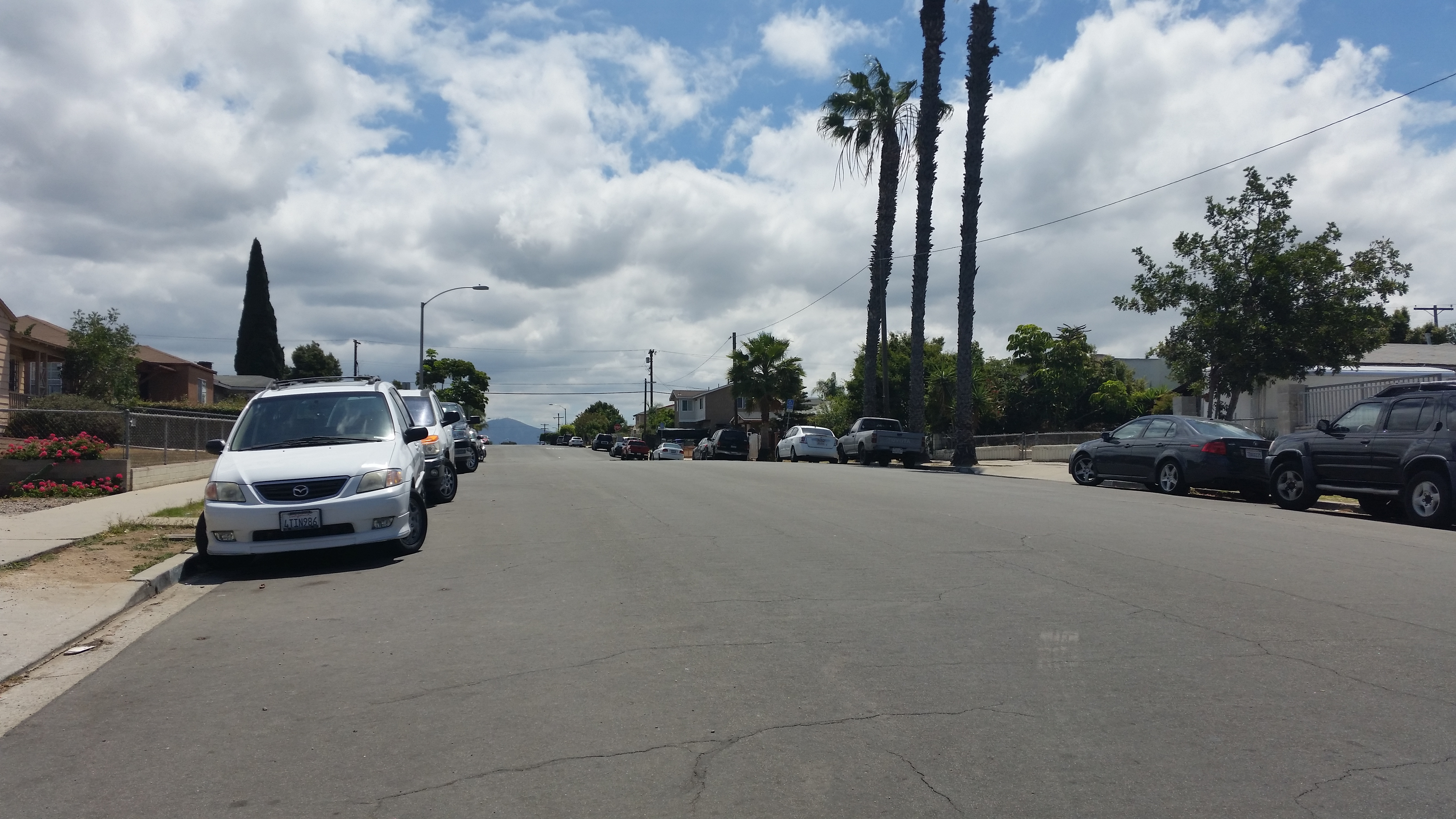
San Miguel Mountain seen from Mountain View

Mountain View is an urban community in the southeastern section of San Diego, California. It is bordered by Mount Hope and Greenwood Memorial Park on the north, Interstate 15 and the neighborhoods of Stockton and Logan Heights on the west, Interstate 805 and Lincoln Park on the east, and Southcrest and National City on the south. Major thoroughfares include Imperial Avenue and Ocean View Boulevard.

== History ==
The area comprising Mountain View was acquired by the city of San Diego in 1874, and Mountain View Park was dedicated in 1914.

== Demographics ==
Mountain View is a diverse community. Current demographics for the neighborhood are as follows: people of Hispanic heritage make up 76.8%, followed by African-American at 12.1%, then non-Hispanic Whites at 5.3%, Asian at 3.9%, Mixed race at 1.8%, and Others at 0.1%.

== Landmarks and facilities ==
Mountain View abuts two of the largest and oldest cemeteries in San Diego County - Mount Hope Cemetery and Greenwood Memorial Park.

== Government ==
Mountain View is located within the 9th City Council District, currently represented by Sean Elo-Rivera. It is part of the Southeastern San Diego Planning Area.

== Education ==
Mountain View is served by San Diego Unified School District. Public schools in Mountain View include Baker Elementary and Promise Charter School. It is also home to Educational Cultural Complex (ECC), San Diego City College's flagship Continued Education campus.
