= Southeast San Diego =

- Community of San Diego
- Southeast San Diego
- Mural in Chicano Park, Southeast San Diego
- Nickname: "The Southeast"
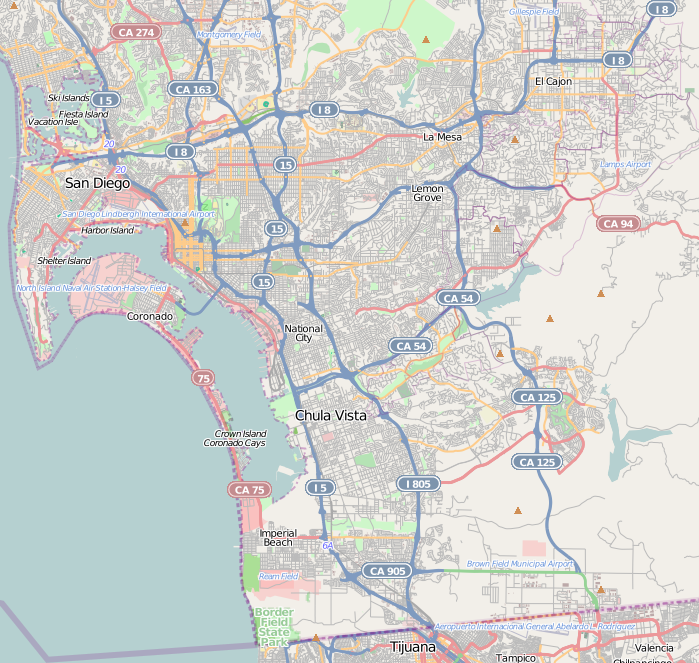
- Location of Southeast San Diego
- Coordinates: 32.700833°N 117.055278°W
- Country: United States
- State: California
- County: San Diego
- City: San Diego

Area
  - Total: 21.2 sq mi (55 km^{2})

Population (2010)
  - Total: 195,000
  - Density: 9,285/sq mi (3,585/km^{2})

Southeast San Diego refers to the southeastern portion of San Diego, including the neighborhoods south of State Route 94 (Martin Luther King Jr. Freeway) and east of downtown San Diego (but excluding South San Diego). Southeast San Diego has no official definition, but it may be considered coterminous with three official planning areas: Skyline-Paradise Hills, Chollas Valley, and Southeastern.

Largely urbanized in the areas nearer downtown San Diego to the west and characteristically hilly, with lower-density residential and semi-rural neighborhoods toward the east, Southeast San Diego is economically and ethnically diverse.

In 1992, Councilman George Stevens campaigned against any official usage of the name "Southeast San Diego," since the designation had long been viewed as shorthand for the community as being crime-ridden and impoverished. His campaign was successful and all official use of "Southeast San Diego" has been discontinued by the city. Many residents and locals however, still refer to the area as "Southeast."

== Geography ==
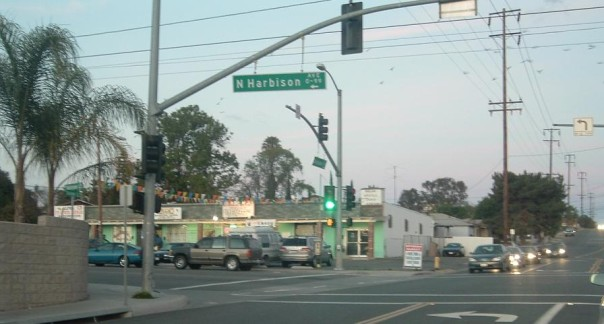
On the intersection of N Harbison Ave. and Division St., at the border of National City and Alta Vista

Southeast San Diego has been defined as the portion of San Diego which lies south of State Route 94 Martin Luther King Jr. Freeway, east of Interstate 5, and north of State Route 54. Barrio Logan, which lies west of Interstate 5, is often included within Southeast San Diego as well. Southeast San Diego borders the cities of National City to the south and Lemon Grove to the northeast, as well as the unincorporated communities of Spring Valley to the east and Bonita to the southeast.

== Political boundaries ==
The areas southeast of downtown San Diego include portions of Council Districts 4, 8 and 9 (Encanto Neighborhoods, Skyline-Paradise Hills, and Southeastern respectively). A few neighborhoods in Central San Diego directly east of downtown and south of the Martin Luther King Jr. Freeway have long been considered part of Southeast San Diego by locals, and are under the Southeastern Planning Area, including Sherman Heights, Logan Heights, Grant Hill, Memorial, and Stockton Though Barrio Logan belongs to its own Community Planning Area, the neighborhood has historically been referred to officially as "Western Southeast San Diego" and is still widely considered as part of Southeast San Diego locally and politically.

=== Neighborhoods ===
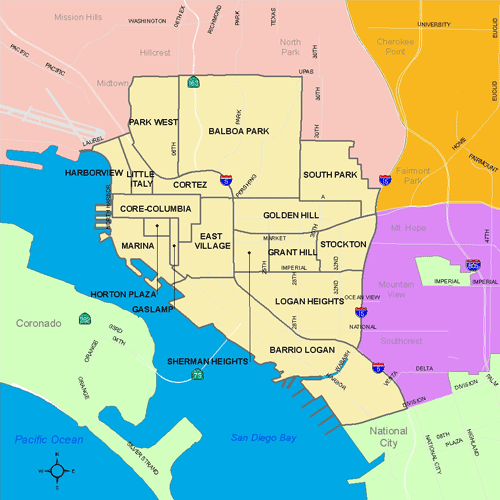
Central portion of San Diego and neighborhood boundaries

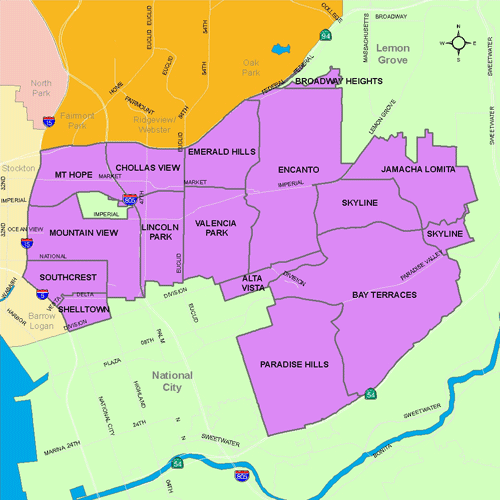
Southeastern portion of San Diego and neighborhood boundaries

Skyline-Paradise Hills Planning Area

- Skyline
- Paradise Hills
- South Bay Terraces
- North Bay Terraces
- Lomita
- Jamacha

Southeastern Planning Area

- Sherman Heights*
- Logan Heights*
- Grant Hill*
- Memorial*
- Stockton*
- Mount Hope
- Mountain View
- Southcrest
- Shelltown

Encanto Neighborhoods Planning Area

- Oak Park
- Emerald Hills
- Chollas View
- Lincoln Park
- Alta Vista
- Valencia Park
- O'Farrell (formerly South Encanto)
- Encanto (formerly North Encanto)
- Broadway Heights

Barrio Logan Planning Area

- Barrio Logan*

* denotes Southeastern neighborhoods located within the central area of San Diego

== Transportation ==
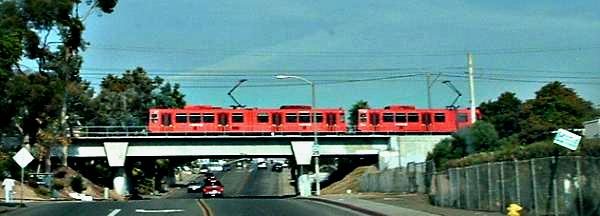
San Diego Trolley, Orange Line train over 47th Street. Chollas View

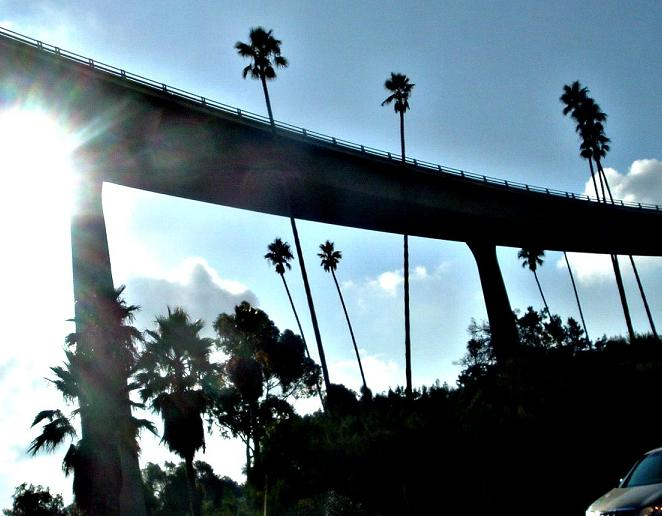
43rd St. Overpass by Interstate 805. Lincoln Park

=== Trains ===
==== Light rail ====
- San Diego Trolley: Blue Line
  - Barrio Logan
  - Harborside
  - Pacific Fleet (NS San Diego at 32nd Street)
- San Diego Trolley: Orange Line
  - Massachusetts Avenue (Lemon Grove)
  - Encanto/62nd Street
  - Euclid Avenue
  - 47th Street
  - 32nd & Commercial
  - 25th & Commercial

=== Highways ===
- Interstate 5
- Interstate 15
- Interstate 805
- State Route 54
- State Route 94

== Demographics ==
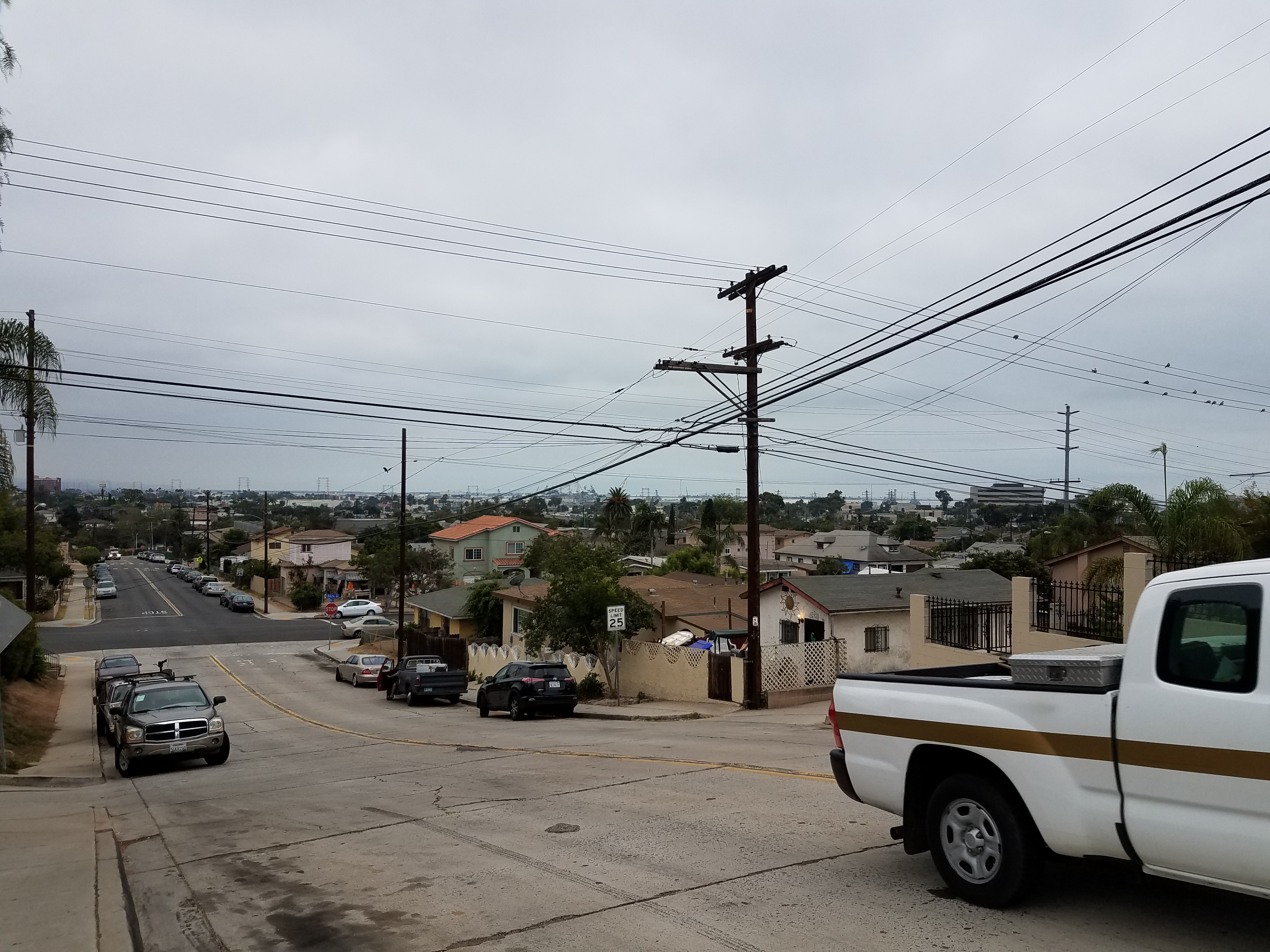
An image looking southward on 40th Street, Naval Base San Diego in the distance from the Shelltown neighborhood

Southeast San Diego is widely viewed as one of the most diverse areas in the city, inhabited most visibly by Latinos, African-Americans, and Filipinos. Estimates based on the neighborhoods spanning the 92102, 92113, 92114, and 92139 ZIP codes of Southeast San Diego put the population at roughly 195,000 people over an area of 21.2 square miles (55 km^{2}), placing the area's population density at 9,285.7/sq mi (3,565.5/km^{2}). Throughout the area, virtually every neighborhood is predominantly BIPOC, with small concentrations of non-Hispanic Whites, though certain neighborhoods hold a majority or significant plurality of one racial and ethnic group over others. Southcrest, for example is 89.5% Latino. In nearby Skyline, African-Americans make up 31.6% of the neighborhood's population, a much higher than average demographic make-up in comparison to other neighborhoods in the area. Lastly, in Bay Terraces and bordering Paradise Hills, there is a significantly high Asian-Pacific Islander (predominantly Filipino) population of 44.3% and 32.9%, respectively.

The area of Barrio Logan, for example, had been first settled by Mexicans arriving in the 1890s, followed soon after by refugees fleeing the violence of the Mexican Revolution and the poor Mexican economy between 1910 and 1920. Barrio Logan is predominantly Latino and is home to Chicano Park. Though located near the City's Central core, it has long been considered part of Southeast San Diego, being directly southeast of downtown, and with previous historical records labeling it as part of "Western Southeast San Diego."

Prior to "white flight" in the 1960s and early 1970s, many neighborhoods in Southeast San Diego were subject to discriminatory restrictive covenants, a problem faced by African-Americans like former Councilman and Deputy Mayor George Stevens, who was denied the opportunity to purchase a house in the Skyline Hills from a white realtor. Presently, much of the Skyline Hills, as well as other Encanto neighborhoods such as Emerald Hills, Lincoln Park, Mountain View, O'Farrell, South Encanto, and Valencia Park, have a substantial African-American population.

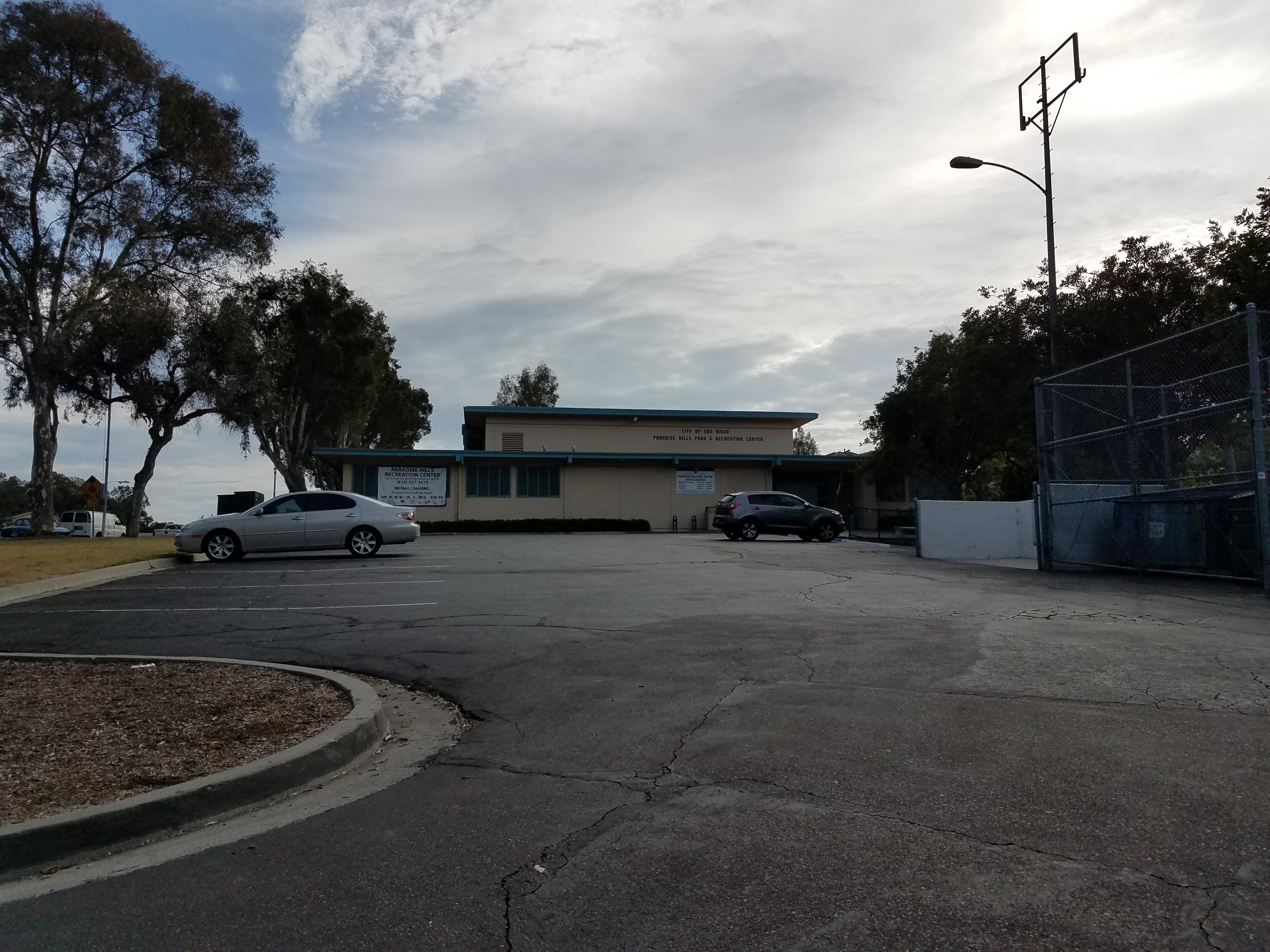
A recreation center in the Paradise Hills neighborhood

With the great influx of Filipino immigrants joining the United States Navy, especially from the Vietnam War era on to the 1990s, many Filipinos inhabited the Southeast San Diego neighborhoods of Alta Vista, Bay Terraces, Paradise Hills, Shelltown, Skyline Hills, and Valencia Park, both for the relatively affordable housing prices and its close proximity to Naval Base San Diego. During the 1980s, in the interest of urban renewal, an unused tract of land (formerly a canyon) between the Skyline and Paradise Hills neighborhoods underwent development. This tract would eventually become Bay Terraces. The notion of a new subdivision built directly triangulated in what were already considered high-crime areas repelled the great majority of home-buyers. The homes were also priced out of the range of typical residents of the area and most went unsold or, in some cases, unbuilt. Federal subsidies and economic programs were then employed to assist in completing and populating the subdivision. As a result, military personnel, Filipino immigrants with military ties, and low-income families were able to secure loans to buy the new homes in the area. The federally funded recovery project was only marginally successful, however, as several large portions of the development stood partially constructed and abandoned for nearly twenty years, the most noticeable example at the intersection of Skyline Dr. and Woodman Ave.

Additionally, enlisted military personnel (ranks E-1 to E-6) and their families occupy the Bayview Hills, a sprawling military housing complex operated by Lincoln Military Housing. This community of townhouse-style homes occupy a significant tract north of Paradise Hills adjacent to National City.

Demographics from the remaining senior public high schools in the area, Samuel F. B. Morse High School in the Skyline neighborhood and Lincoln High School in Lincoln Park, provide unique snapshot samples of the area's diversity, especially around Free-Reduced Lunch eligibility, where roughly 80% (for Morse) and 85% (for Lincoln) of the respective student bodies were eligible, a figure that reflects the working-class nature of the area.

== Crime ==
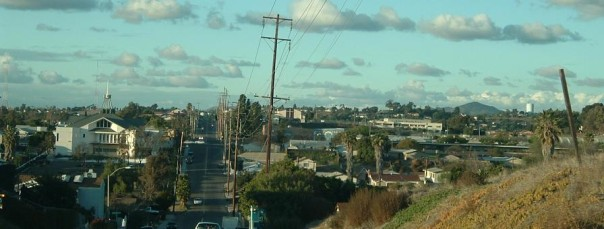
View of O'Farrell Park and South Encanto from 61st St. near O'Farrell Community School

Southeast San Diego had long struggled with an image problem plagued by street gangs, drug dealing, assaults, and homicide throughout its communities. In 1992, Councilman George Stevens campaigned against any official designation of the area as "Southeast San Diego" since the name labeled the area in an entirely negative light.

The San Diego Police Department's Southeastern Division includes some of the city's peak crime areas including the neighborhoods of Encanto, Paradise Hills, Lincoln Park, Chollas View, Skyline, Shelltown, and Southcrest. Many of the inhabitants in these neighborhoods are working class or lower-income, and a typical sight that is evident throughout Southeast San Diego are homes outfitted with iron bars over the ground-floor windows and doors, and in many cases, cast-iron gates and chain-link fences guarding driveways, a reflection of the perceived need for security in these high-crime urban neighborhoods.

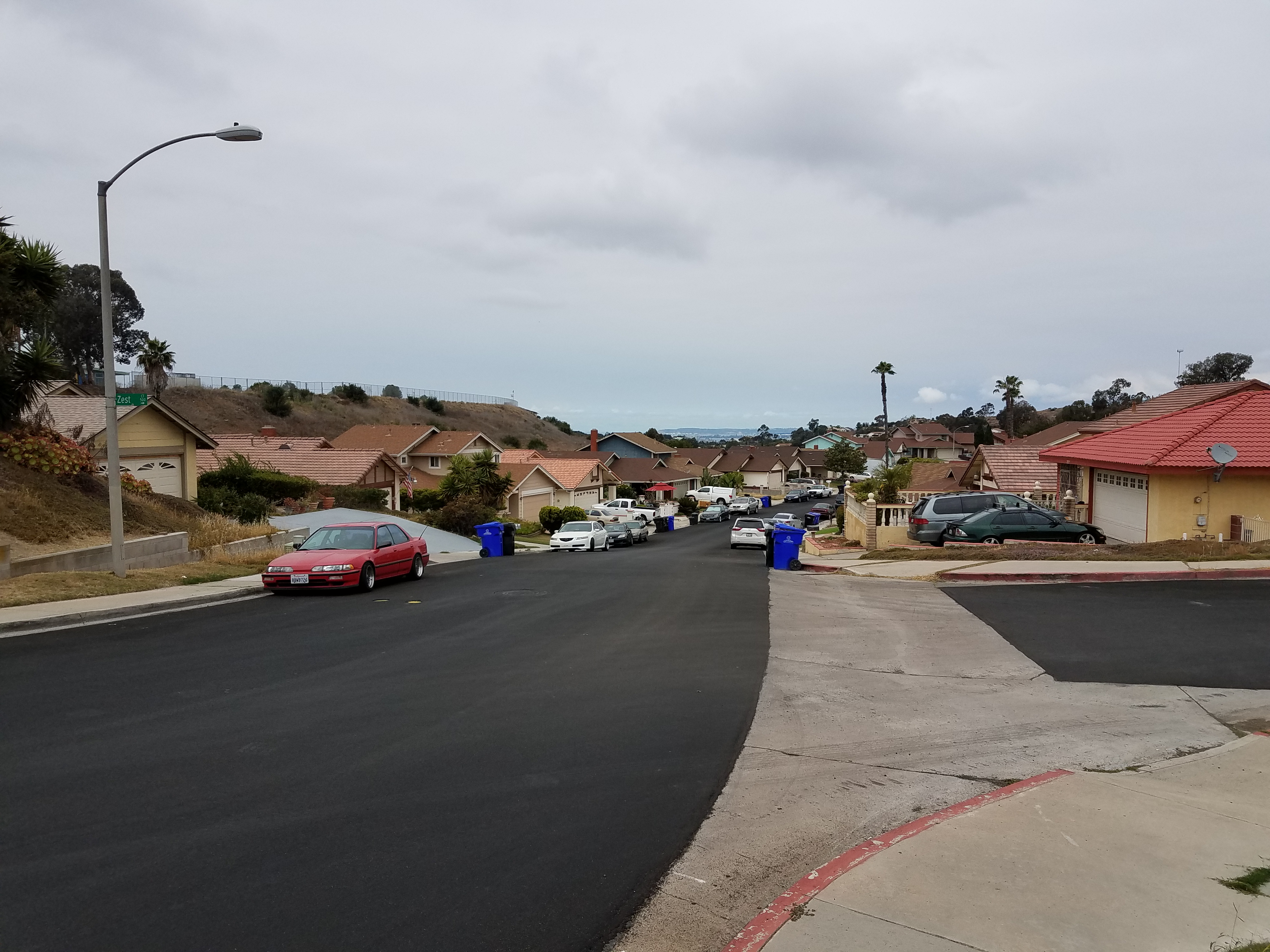
A neighborhood north of Bell Middle School in Paradise Hills

Southeast San Diego is home to some of the deadliest zip codes in the County. In 1990, for example, San Diego registered 135 homicides, with 100 occurring south of Interstate 8 and concentrated in Barrio Logan and Southeast San Diego, along with City Heights and South San Diego. Although crime has gone down citywide over the years, shootings are still a regular occurrence throughout Southeast San Diego, and the area continues to see a disproportionate number of homicides in relation to the rest of the city. Additionally, many crimes in the area are not reported to the police which makes it difficult to give a completely accurate assessment on crime statistics in Southeast San Diego. Over the last few years, statistics from the San Diego Police Department show that about half of all homicides in the whole city had been accounted for in southeastern San Diego neighborhoods (covered by both the Central and Southeastern Districts), a substantial figure considering Southeast San Diego's relatively small geographic size and population in relation to the rest of the city. For example, in 2004, of the 62 homicides in the City of San Diego, 32 of them (roughly 16.4 murders per 100,000 residents or three times the national average of 5.5 murders per 100,000 for that year) had been accounted for in sixteen southeastern San Diego neighborhoods, from Barrio Logan to Lomita Village. In comparison, the northern San Diego suburb of Mira Mesa, which covers a substantial geographical area sizeable to Southeast San Diego's, 21.4 square miles (55 km^{2}) to Southeast San Diego's 21.2 square miles (55 km^{2}), had no homicides for that year. More recent figures show that in 2019, of the 50 homicides in the City of San Diego, 20 of those occurred in seven Southeast San Diego neighborhoods, with Paradise Hills leading all city neighborhoods with 7 murders (a rate of 41.91 murders per 100,000 people), followed by Logan Heights with 5 (34.77 murders per 100,000 people).

The intersection of Euclid Avenue and Imperial Avenue in Lincoln Park has been given the nickname "The Four Corners of Death" due to the large number of homicides which have occurred on and around it. Of the county's estimated 88 gangs, at least 50 operate within a few miles of this intersection.

Sections of Bay Terraces recorded the greatest percentage increase in violent crimes during a five-year period reviewed by the San Diego Union-Tribune. The census block, from Paradise Valley Road to just south of Shadyglade Lane along South Meadowbrook Drive saw violent crime reports increase 450 percent. For the entire five-year period, there were 51 reported violent crimes, or about one every five weeks in just those few blocks alone.

According to a study by Rand Corporation, homicides in Southeast San Diego share similar demographic characteristics with those in the Los Angeles Police Department's 77th Street Division (which serves South Central Los Angeles), though despite having 29 gangs appear in the San Diego Police Department's Southeast Division's murder files, only a handful of gangs appear responsible for the majority of gun violence that has occurred.

In 2010, the Southeast San Diego neighborhoods of Logan Heights and Lincoln Park were featured on The History Channel's Gangland television series. The show documented the Logan Heights Gang in the Season 6 episode titled "The Assassins," which first aired on February 19, 2010. Less than three months later, the Lincoln Park Bloods were featured on the Season 7 episode titled, "Vendetta of Blood" which first aired on May 14, 2010.

The rash of violence in Southeast San Diego had been met with community outrage over the years and prompted a series of anti-violence marches and rallies. In 2005, as a response to the spike in violence in the area, hundreds of middle school students took part in an anti-violence rally from the Lincoln Park area to Gompers Park in Chollas View, echoing chants of "Peace in Southeast" as they marched. More recent efforts in 2020 to revitalize the area through the arts brought artists and activists to the intersection of Euclid Ave and Imperial Ave in Lincoln Park, in an attempt to reclaim the deadly street intersection long considered as "The Four Corners of Death," to "The Four Corners of Life."

== Landmarks ==
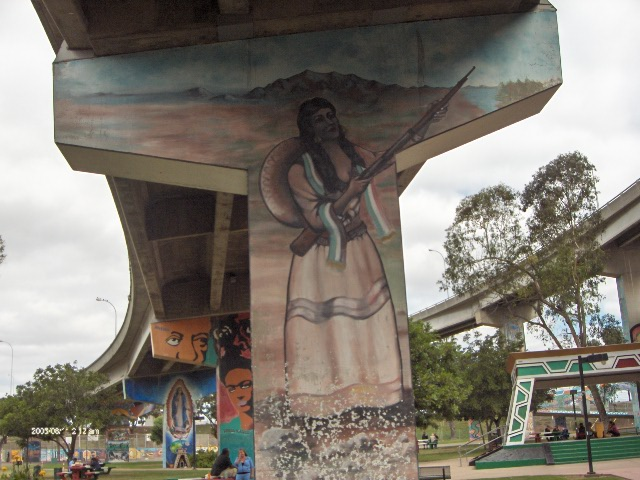
Chicano Park Mural in Barrio Logan

There are various landmarks, historical places, and other noteworthy locations in Southeast San Diego. Murals and dedicated public art areas are spread out across the community, the most notable of which are Chicano Park, a nearly 8 acre park of murals under the Coronado Bridge in Barrio Logan, and Writerz Blok, the first legal graffiti art park in the nation with over 10,000 sq. ft. of paintable walls in its half acre site, in Chollas View.

- Chicano Park (Barrio Logan)
- Coronado Bridge (Barrio Logan)
- Elementary Institute of Science (Emerald Hills)
- Malcolm X Library and Performing Arts Center (Valencia Park)
- Murals along Ocean View Blvd near Interstate 15 (Mountain View)
- Terra Nova Garden at Morse High School (Skyline Hills)
- Southeastern Live Well Center (currently the Tubman-Chavez Community Center) (Valencia Park)
- Walls of Excellence (Lincoln Park)
- Writerz Blok (Chollas View)
- Villa Montezuma (Sherman Heights)

== Education ==
Abraham Lincoln High School in Lincoln Park

Samuel F. B. Morse High School in the Skyline Hills

Southeast San Diego is served primarily by the San Diego Unified School District, along with some charter and private schools.

Based on surveys area principals conducted with parents, violence is a big part of the reason why 70 percent of southeastern San Diego families opt for charters or schools in other neighborhoods.

Many students in Southeast San Diego have taken advantage of San Diego Unified School District's Voluntary Enrollment Exchange Program (VEEP), and have opted to be bused to high schools in San Diego's more affluent northern suburban neighborhoods,. Depending on their VEEP Allied School Pattern, a high school student, for example, may be voluntarily bused to Mira Mesa High School, Mission Bay High School, Scripps Ranch High School, Canyon Hills High School, and University City High School.

=== Elementary schools ===
- Audubon Elementary
- Balboa Elementary
- Baker Elementary
- Bethune Elementary
- Boone Elementary
- Burbank Elementary
- Cesar Chavez Elementary
- Chollas-Mead Elementary
- Daniel Boone Elementary
- Emerson/Bandini Elementary
- Encanto Elementary
- Freese Elementary
- Fulton Elementary
- Horton Elementary
- Johnson Elementary
- John F. Kennedy Elementary
- Logan Elementary
- Mt. Erie Christian Academy (Private)
- Nye Elementary
- Oliver Hazard Perry Elementary
- Pacific View Elementary
- Paradise Hills Elementary
- Penn Elementary
- Perkins Elementary
- Porter Elementary
- Rodriguez Elementary
- Valencia Park Elementary
- Webster Elementary
- Zamorano Elementary

=== Middle and junior high schools ===
- Bell Middle School
- Gompers Preparatory Academy (6-12)
- Keiller Leadership Academy (Middle School)
- KIPP Adelante Preparatory Academy (Middle School)
- Knox Middle School
- Millennial Tech Middle School

=== Senior high schools ===
The Southeast San Diego area is served primarily by three urban senior high schools.

- Abraham Lincoln High School
- Samuel F. B. Morse High School
- San Diego High School (in downtown San Diego)

=== Atypical and other charter schools ===
- Cristo Rey San Diego High School (grades 9-12)
- Gompers Preparatory Academy (grades 6-12)
- Holly Drive Leadership (grades K-8)
- King/Chavez Preparatory Academy
- Marcy School
- Memorial Preparatory for Scholars & Athletes (under construction) (grades K-12)
- Nubia Leadership Academy (closed in 2014)
- The O'Farrell Charter School (grades K-12)
- San Diego School of Creative and Performing Arts (grades 6-12)
- Twain High School (Morse Campus)

== People from Southeast San Diego ==
=== Artists ===
- Yolanda M. Lopez, artist (Logan Heights, Lincoln High School)
- Salvador Torres, artist and muralist, Chicano Park (Barrio Logan)

=== Athletes ===
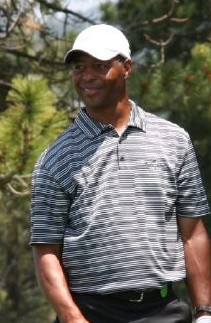
Marcus Allen, Lincoln High School Alumni.

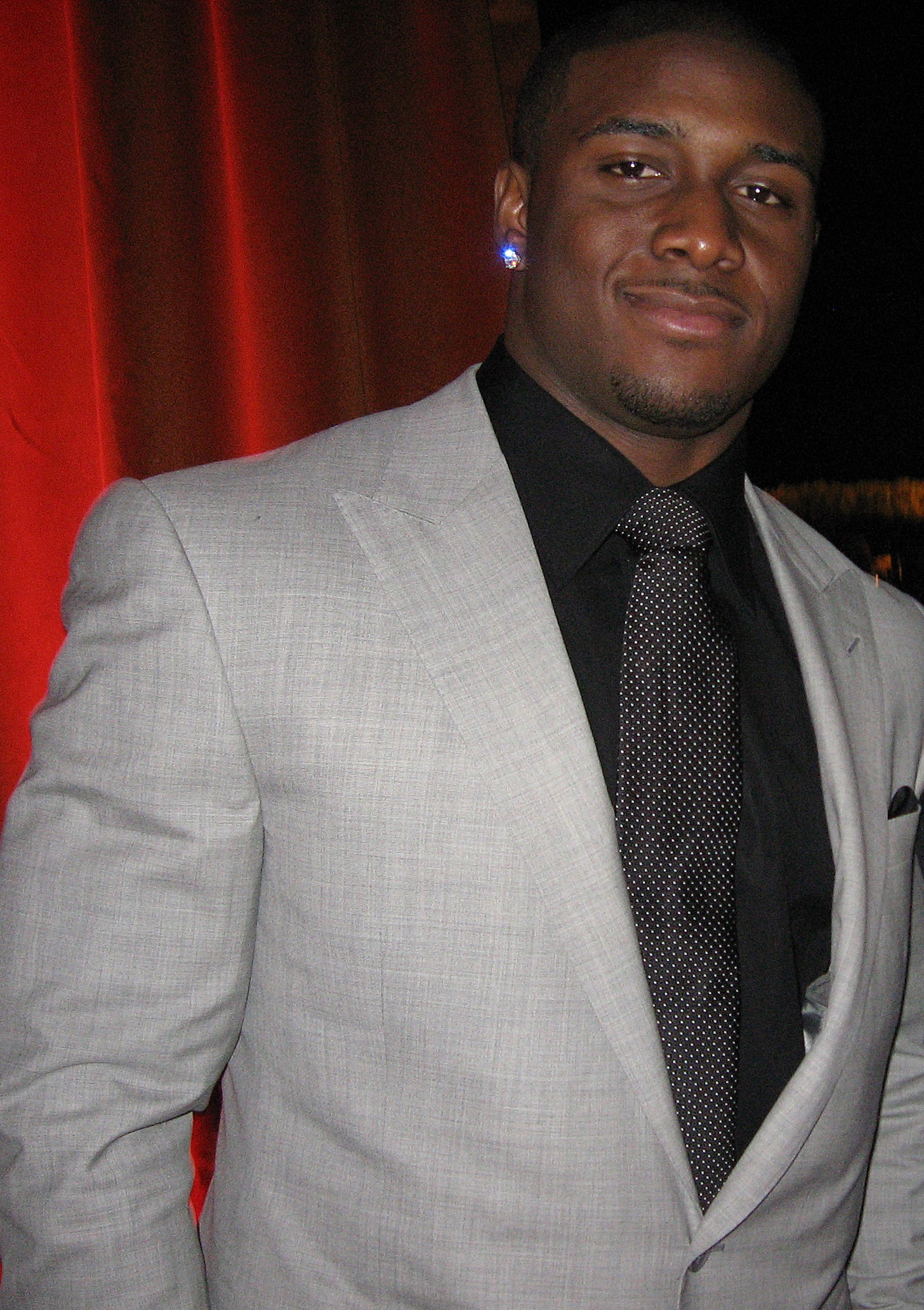
Reggie Bush, grew up in the Skyline Hills

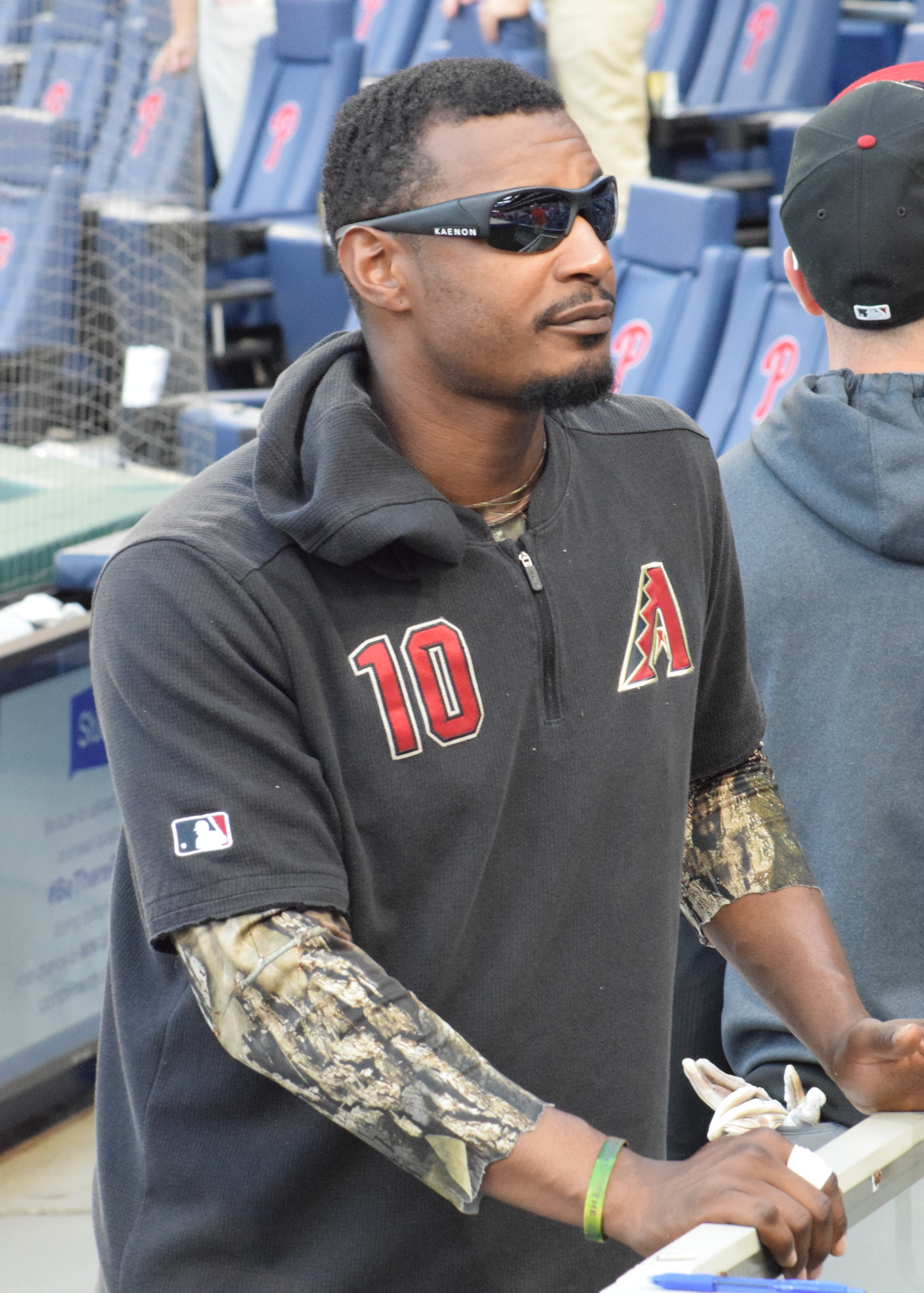
Adam Jones, grew up in the Skyline Hills and graduated from Morse High School

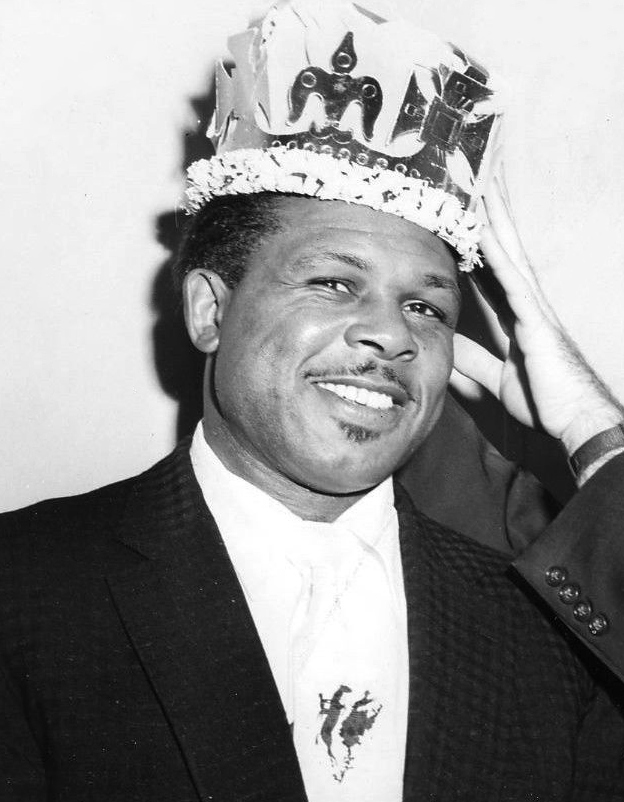
Archie Moore, eventually adopted Stockton as his longtime home

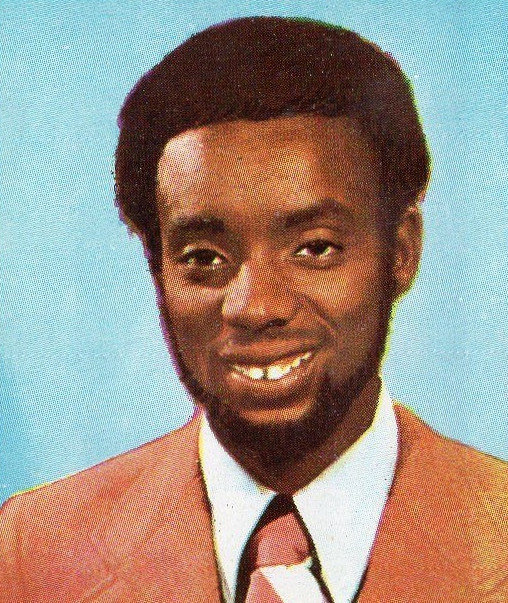
Arnie Robinson, grew up in Paradise Hills and graduated from Morse High School

- Eric Allen, football, (Southcrest, O'Farrell Junior High School)
- Marcus Allen, football, 1981 Heisman Trophy winner (Lincoln High School)
- Archie Amerson, football (Morse high school) CFL.
- Tommy Bennett, football (Morse High School)
- Quintin Berry, baseball (Morse High School)
- Marcus Brady, football (Morse High School)
- Reggie Bush, football, 2005 Heisman Trophy winner (Skyline Hills)
- Rashard Cook, football (Morse High School)
- Terrell Davis, football (Morse and Lincoln High School)
- Tony Drake, pro wrestling
- David Dunn, football (Morse High School)
- Lonnie Ford, football (Morse High School)
- LaRoi Glover, football
- Dave Grayson, football (Lincoln High School)
- Monique Henderson, track and field, 2004 and 2008 Olympic Gold Medalist, 4 × 400 m relay (Morse High School)
- Wally Henry, football (Lincoln High School) NFL Pro Bowler Philadelphia Eagles
- Sam Horn, baseball (Morse High School)
- Adam Jones, baseball (Morse High School)
- Jacque Jones, baseball (San Diego High School)
- Lincoln Kennedy, football (Skyline Hills, Morse High School)
- Cliff Levingston, basketball (Morse High School)
- Dominic McGuire, basketball (Lincoln High School)
- Mark McLemore, baseball (Morse High School)
- Keith Mitchell, baseball (Lincoln High School) Seattle Mariners, cousin of Kevin Mitchell
- Kevin Mitchell, baseball (Mountain View), cousin of Keith Mitchell
- Archie Moore, boxing (Stockton)
- Norman Powell, high school basketball (Lincoln High School), college basketball (UCLA 2011-2015), professional basketball (2015–Present)
- Arnie Robinson, track and field, 1972 Olympic Bronze Medalist and 1976 Olympic Gold Medalist, long jump (Paradise Hills, Morse High School)
- Rashaan Salaam, football, 1994 Heisman Trophy winner
- Akili Smith, football (Lincoln High School)
- Marcus Smith, football (Morse High School)

=== Other ===
- David Barron, Mexican Mafia figure and enforcer for the Tijuana Cartel (Logan Heights)
- Sagon Penn, Acquitted for the 1985 shooting death of a San Diego Police Officer.

=== Musical and performance artists ===
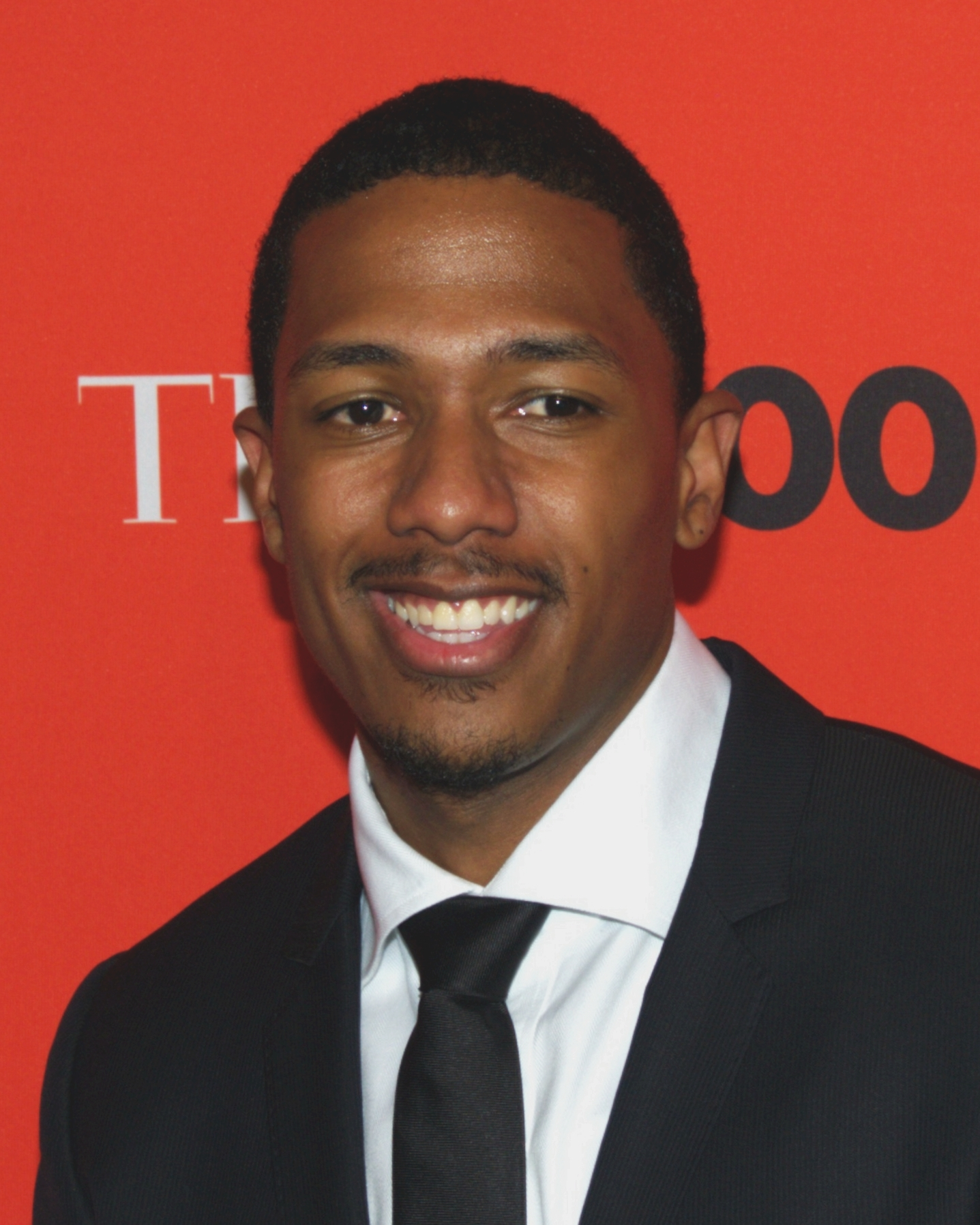
Nick Cannon, grew up in Grant Hill and Lincoln Park

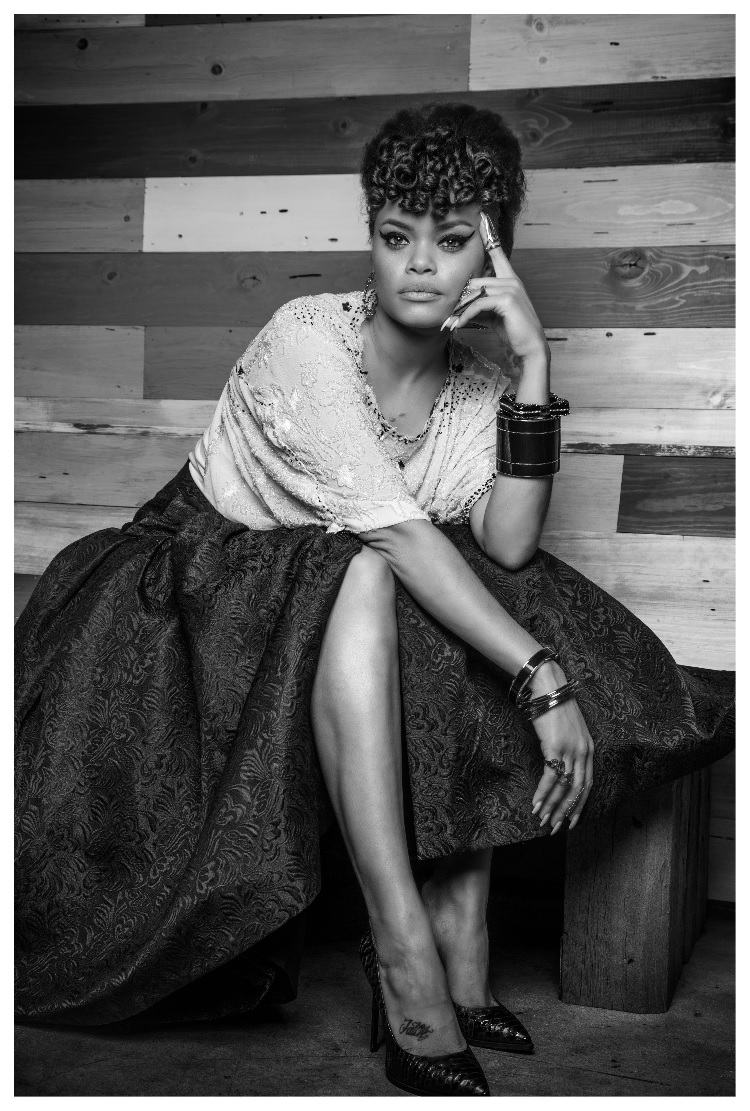
Andra Day, grew up in Valencia Park and graduated from San Diego School of Creative and Performing Arts

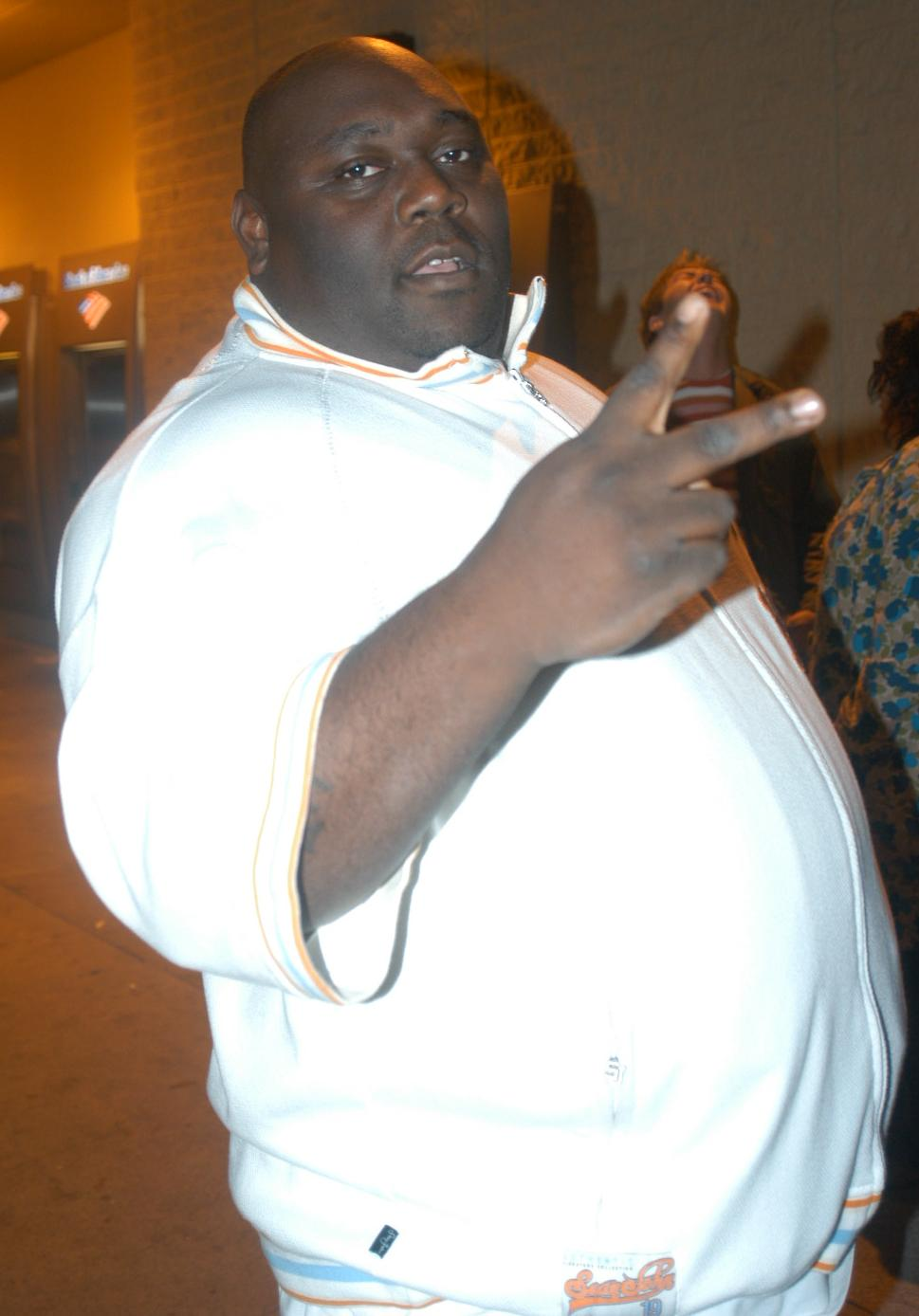
Faizon Love, grew up in Emerald Hills and graduated from Morse High School

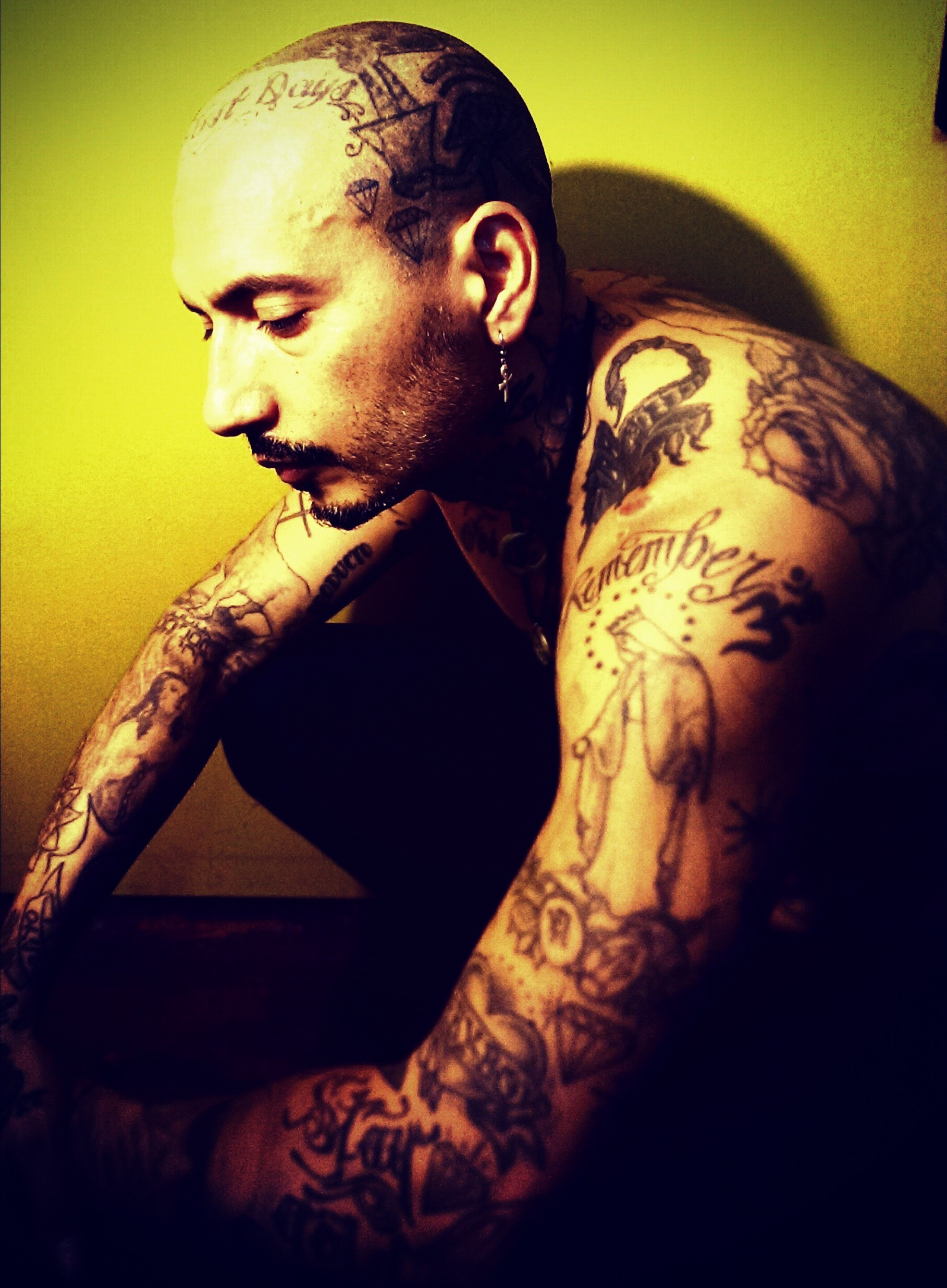
Rafael Reyes, Sherman Heights native

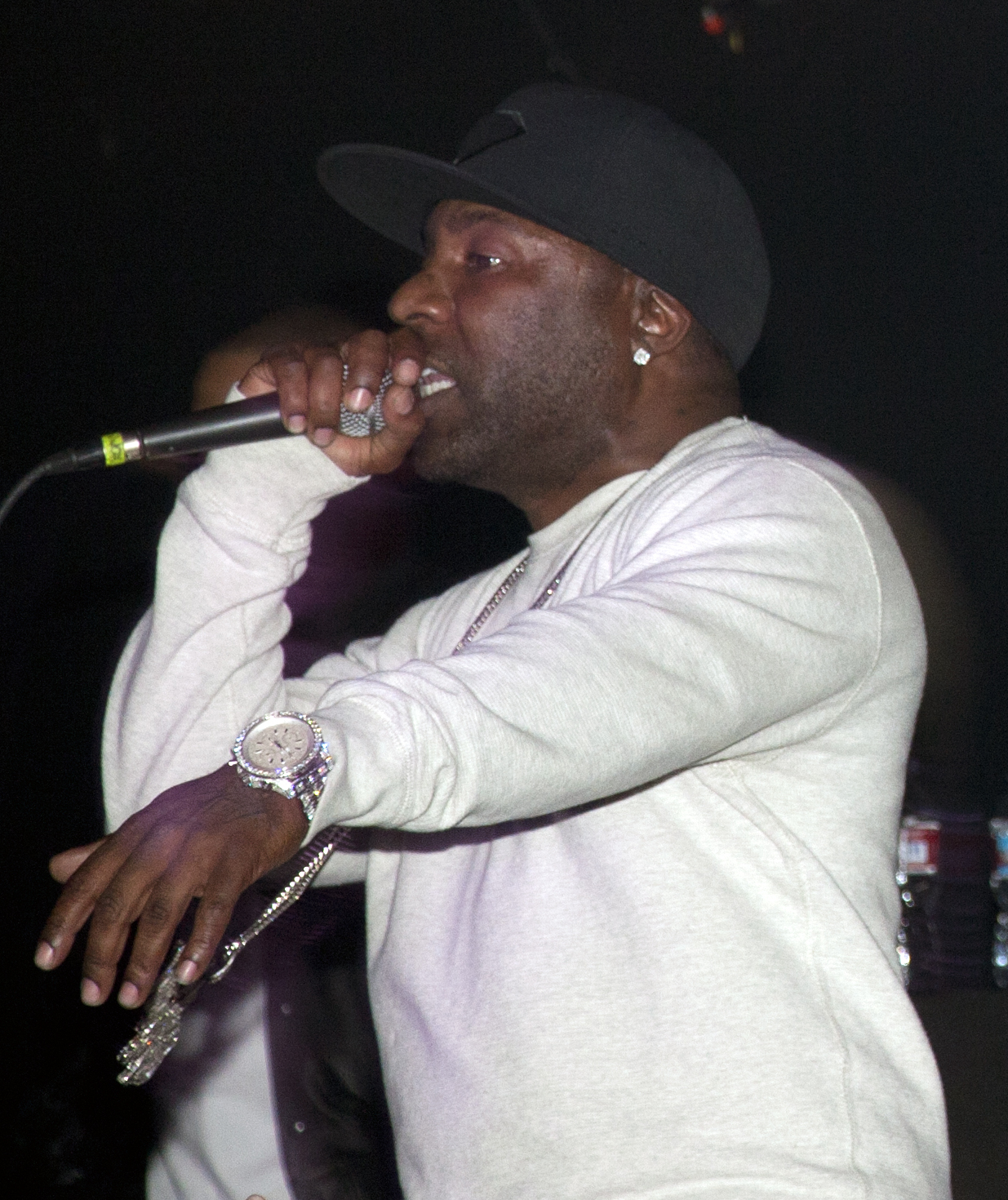
Mitchy Slick, Lincoln Park native and alumni of Lincoln High School

- B.Slade (formerly known as Tonèx), rapper, singer, and songwriter (Oak Park)
- Nick Cannon, rapper, actor, comedian (Grant Hill and Lincoln Park)
- Andra Day, singer (Valencia Park and San Diego School of Creative and Performing Arts)
- Jayo Felony, rapper (Chollas View, Gompers Secondary High School)
- Rosie Hamlin, singer and songwriter (O'Farrell Community School)
- Lecrae, rapper (Skyline Hills)
- Ananda Lewis, model, television personality (San Diego School of Creative and Performing Arts)
- Faizon Love, actor (Emerald Hills, Morse High School)
- Mitchy Slick, rapper (Lincoln Park, Lincoln High School)
- Members of the rock band My American Heart (Morse High School)
- Rafael Reyes, creator of the Cholo Goth genre and member of Prayers (Sherman Heights, Grant Hill)
- Tiny Doo, rapper (Lincoln Park)
- Tom Waits, singer and songwriter (O'Farrell Community School)

=== Political figures ===
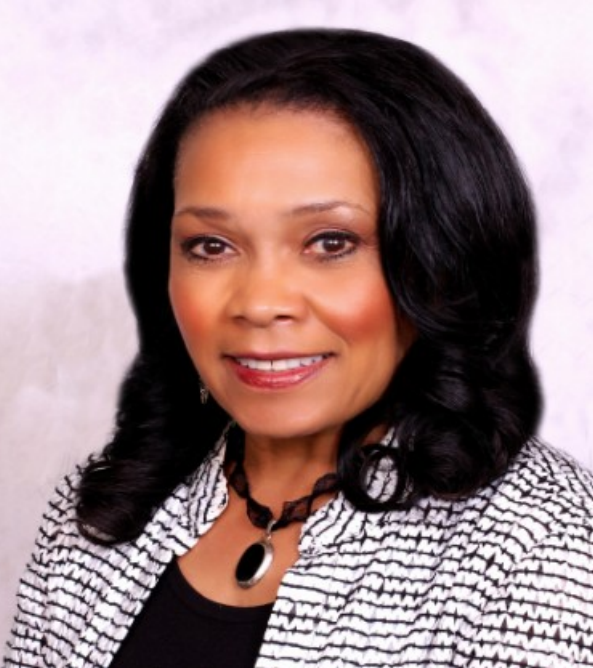
Myrtle Cole, longtime resident and Council member of District 4

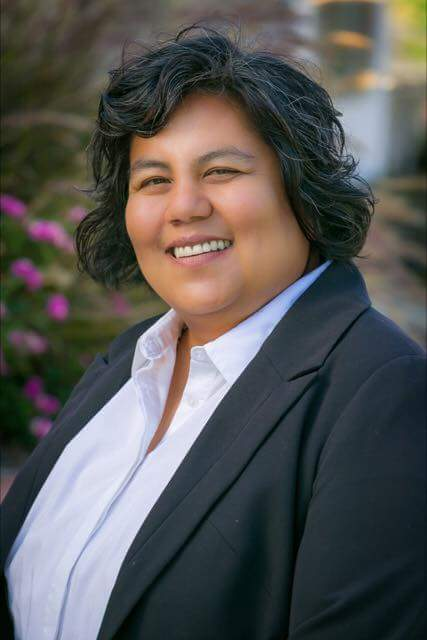
Georgette Gómez, Barrio Logan native

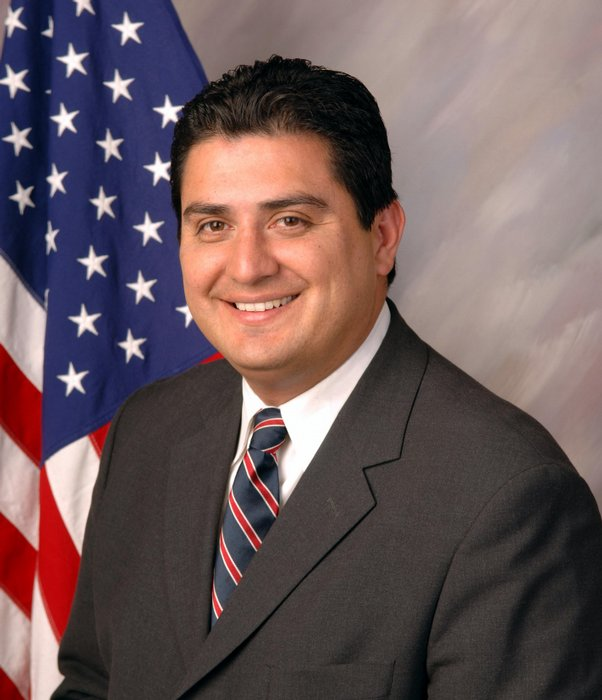
Ben Hueso, grew up in Logan Heights

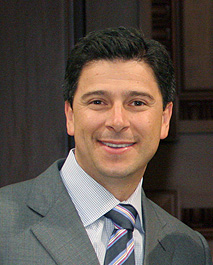
Fabian Núñez, grew up in Logan Heights

- Myrtle Cole, former San Diego City Councilmember (4th District), former President of the San Diego City Council
- Georgette Gómez, San Diego City Councilmember (9th District), President of the San Diego City Council (Barrio Logan)
- Shirley Horton, California Assemblywoman and former Mayor of Chula Vista (Paradise Hills, O'Farrell Junior High School)
- Ben Hueso, California State Senator from the 40th Senate District (Logan Heights)
- Charles L. Lewis, former San Diego City Councilmember (4th District) (Morse High School)
- Fabian Núñez, former Speaker of the California State Assembly (Logan Heights, San Diego High School)
- Monica Montgomery Steppe, San Diego City Councilmember (4th District)
- George L. Stevens, former San Diego City Councilmember (4th District), and former Deputy Mayor of the City of San Diego (Skyline Hills)
- Tony Young, former San Diego City Councilmember (4th District) (Morse High School)

=== Distinguished military veterans ===
- Marine Sergeant Rafael Peralta, USMC, casualty Iraq War (Morse High School)

== In popular culture ==
Southeast San Diego has appeared in various media and has been referenced in many songs.

=== Chollas View/Mt. Hope ===
- Rollin' Forties Neighborhood Crips claim this area.

=== Barrio Logan ===
- Chicano Park was subject to a 1988 documentary, produced by Redbird Films
- The 2012 Academy Award-winning documentary, Inocente, featured Inocente Izucar, a then-homeless teen and aspiring artist who hailed from Barrio Logan among other areas in the city
- Scenes from the film South of 8 (2016) were shot in Chicano Park
- Chicano Park is featured prominently in the 2016 music video, "Mexica," by Prayers

=== Grant Hill ===
- In 2007, actor and rapper Nick Cannon was featured in the VH1 show Rags to Riches. In it, he showcases his upbringing in Southeast San Diego, including the first apartments he grew up in with his mother, the Grant Heights Park Apartments, in Grant Hill.
- Grant Hill and Sherman Heights are mentioned repeatedly in the 2017 song, "Death is in Bloom," by Prayers ("Southeast SD, Sherman, GHP")

=== Lincoln Park ===
- In 2010, Lincoln Park was featured on The History Channel's Gangland television series. the Lincoln Park Bloods were featured on the Season 7 episode titled, "Vendetta of Blood" which first aired on May 14, 2010. Lincoln Park native and rapper, Mitchy Slick, appears extensively in the broadcast.

=== Logan Heights ===
- In 2010, Logan Heights was featured on The History Channel's Gangland television series. The show documented the Logan Heights Gang in the Season 6 episode titled "The Assassins," which first aired on February 19, 2010.
- The Logan Heights Gang and its ties to the Tijuana Cartel, are depicted in the 2017 Netflix and Univision series, El Chapo.

=== Paradise Hills ===
- Scenes from the film, South of 8 (2016) were shot in Paradise Hills

=== Sherman Heights ===
- Sherman Heights and Grant Hill are mentioned repeatedly in the 2017 song, "Death is in Bloom," by Prayers ("Southeast SD, Sherman, GHP")

=== Skyline ===
- The East Side Pirus are referenced along other Piru affiliated groups as "the Skylines" in the 1993 single, "Piru Love" by Los Angeles-based rap group, Bloods & Crips.
- Hip Hop artist, Lecrae, mentions Skyline in his music, most notably on his 2013 single, "I'm Turnt," ("It's Southeast Daygo in the building, shout out to Peter Pan, Skyline, Imperial"), and the 2019 single, "California Dreamin'" with 116, ("I'm rollin' down Imperial, old school in my stereo, from Skyline, you don't hear me, though (Skyline))." The music video for the latter was filmed entirely in the Skyline neighborhood that he grew up in.
