= Lawrence Waldemar Tonner =

Danish-American companion of Francis Grierson

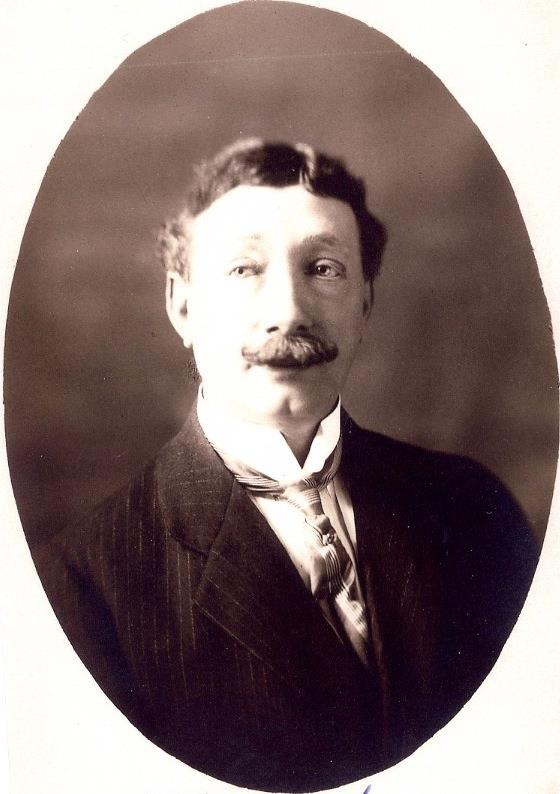
- Born: Lauritz Waldemar Tonner; October 15, 1861; Thisted, Denmark
- Died: May 25, 1947 (aged 85); Los Angeles, California, US
- Burial place: Inglewood Park Cemetery, Inglewood, California
- Occupation(s): Manager, translator

Lawrence Waldemar Tonner (October 15, 1861 – May 25, 1947) was an 1870 immigrant from Denmark who became a naturalized citizen of the United States in 1875. Tonner met Jesse Shepard/Francis Grierson in 1885 and became his companion and personal secretary for more than 40 years, while they traveled and lived together in Europe and the United States. Tonner began his career as a translator in 1892 for the U.S. government in London, and was an aide and translator for Herbert Hoover after World War I. Tonner died in Los Angeles, California.

== Early life ==
Tonner was born in Thisted, Denmark, with one source including that he was "born into Danish nobility". Originally using his Danish given name, Lauritz, he emigrated to the United States in July 1870, sailing from Glasgow. His mother's maiden name was "Lund", according to a California Death Index entry. At age 28, Tonner's description on a U.S. passport application included a height of 5 feet 7 inches, light blue eyes, and light brown hair. The application identifies his father as Johann P. Tonner, through whose naturalization on December 14, 1875, Tonner obtained his own U.S. citizenship, while living in Chicago.

== Shepard/Grierson ==
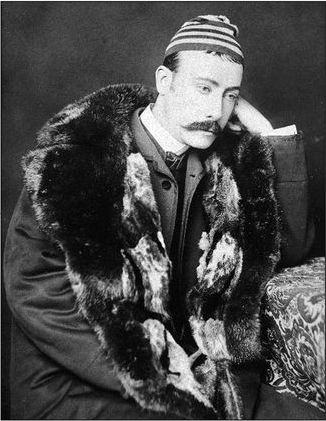
Jesse Shepard (September 18, 1848 – May 29, 1927)

Tonner, who spoke fluently in five languages, did not have a steady job and instead adapted his professional career to the work and travel schedule of Jesse Shepard (1848–1927), a composer, pianist, and writer who used the pen name of Francis Grierson beginning in 1899; Tonner and Shepard met in Chicago in 1885. Tonner acted as a manager and personal secretary for Shepard. Tonner's 1890 U.S. passport application lists an occupation of "seceretary", and includes a certification of identity by Shepard.

Among his many performances, Shepard entertained at the Imperial Palace of Gatchina for the Czar of Russia and before a reunion of three royal houses at Cumberland Palace in Gmunden, Austria. His hostess was the Duchess of Cumberland, sister of the Empress of Russia, of the Princess of Wales and of the Queen of Greece. An account of what happened at the reunion is given by Tonner for "The Hague", in Light, March 17, 1894.

== San Diego to Paris ==
Despite his close association with Shepard, Tonner's name does not appear in the official documents by or about Shepard; for example he is not listed in the San Diego City Directory as living at Villa Montezuma with Shepard. The two shared the home, named for the ship that first brought Shepard to the U.S., from July 1887 to the third quarter of 1888, before taking a mortgage out on the house to fund an initial trip to Paris for the publishing of Shepard's first book. They returned to San Diego in August 1889, and on finding the city's economic boom had ended, sold the home and its furnishings by mid-December before returning to Paris, where they lived until 1896. While in Europe, Tonner began his career as a translator in 1892, working for the United States diplomatic mission in London. Robert Todd Lincoln, the former president's son, had the role of ambassador during this period, and issued a U.S. passport used by Tonner.

== Europe to the United States ==
After Paris, Shepard and Tonner settled in London until 1913, when they decided to return to the United States. In the latter part of that decade, Tonner was a valued aide and translator for Herbert Hoover when the then-future president was head of the Food Administration. Hoover subsequently recommended Tonner for a position with a Bureau of Public Information, via a letter now among the Waldemar Tonner Papers at ONE Archives in Los Angeles.

Tonner had credentials for the National Press Club of Washington, the Chevy Chase Club and The University Club, Washington D.C. In 1920, Tonner and Shepard settled in Los Angeles, which remained home for the rest of their lives.

== Final years ==
After years of traveling the world together, Shepard lost his popularity and Tonner supported him. He taught French and was a partner in a small dry cleaning shop. Shepard died in Los Angeles on May 29, 1927, immediately after playing the last chord of a piano performance for about 30 guests who attended a benefit dinner arranged by friends on his behalf; he was still upright with his hands on the keys and it was Tonner who first noticed that something was wrong. Not long before Shepard/Grierson died, Tonner had published a pamphlet, "The Genius of Francis Grierson", that recounted his travels and musical/literary successes, and included quotations from favorable reviews and letters. Tonner also wrote the introduction to Shepard/Grierson's last book, "Psycho-Phone Messages", published in 1921.

Tonner died 20 years after Shepard on May 25, 1947, in Los Angeles, California, and is buried at Inglewood Park Cemetery in Inglewood, California.
