= Golden Hill, San Diego =

Neighborhood in San Diego, California

Coordinates: 32.718°N 117.134°W

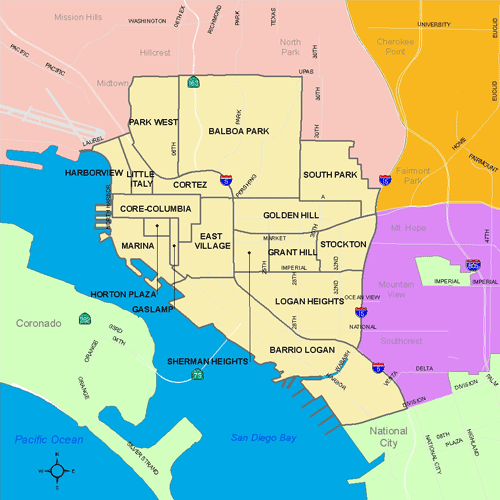
Central portion of San Diego and neighborhood boundaries

Golden Hill is a neighborhood in San Diego, California. It is located south of Balboa Park, north of Sherman Heights, Grant Hill and Stockton, and east of downtown.

Golden Hill is one of San Diego's most historic and architecturally eclectic zones, with many pre-1900 homes and apartments. In the 1910s, it became one of the many San Diego neighborhoods connected by the Class 1 streetcars and an extensive San Diego public transit system that was spurred by the Panama–California Exposition of 1915 and built by John D. Spreckels. These streetcars became a fixture of this neighborhood until their retirement in 1939. Street cars, the number 2 line operated until the mid-1950s. Future city council member Leon Williams was the first Black resident of the neighborhood after he purchased a house in the area in 1947, in defiance of the racial covenant that was part of his house's deed at the time he purchased it. He lived in the house until his death.

This neighborhood is also in walking distance of downtown, San Diego City College, and much of Balboa Park. Auto access is direct from Interstate 5 and State Route 94. The major through streets and bus routes are Broadway (East and West), and 25th Street and 30th Street (North and South). The neighborhood falls within zip code 92102. Pedestrianism, like in other urban mesa neighborhoods surrounding Balboa Park, is high relative to the rest of San Diego.

The now wealthier neighborhood of South Park is sometimes considered part of the Golden Hill neighborhood; the city planning department places both within a district called "Greater Golden Hill Community".

Artists and musicians have long favored the area, especially after being priced out of areas like Little Italy, eastern downtown and Hillcrest. Golden Hill is home to Black Box Recording Studios, The Habitat Recording Studios, Humberto's Taco Shop, Influx Cafe, Turf Supper Club & Pizzeria Luigi (which was featured on the Food Network show Diners, Drive-Ins and Dives).

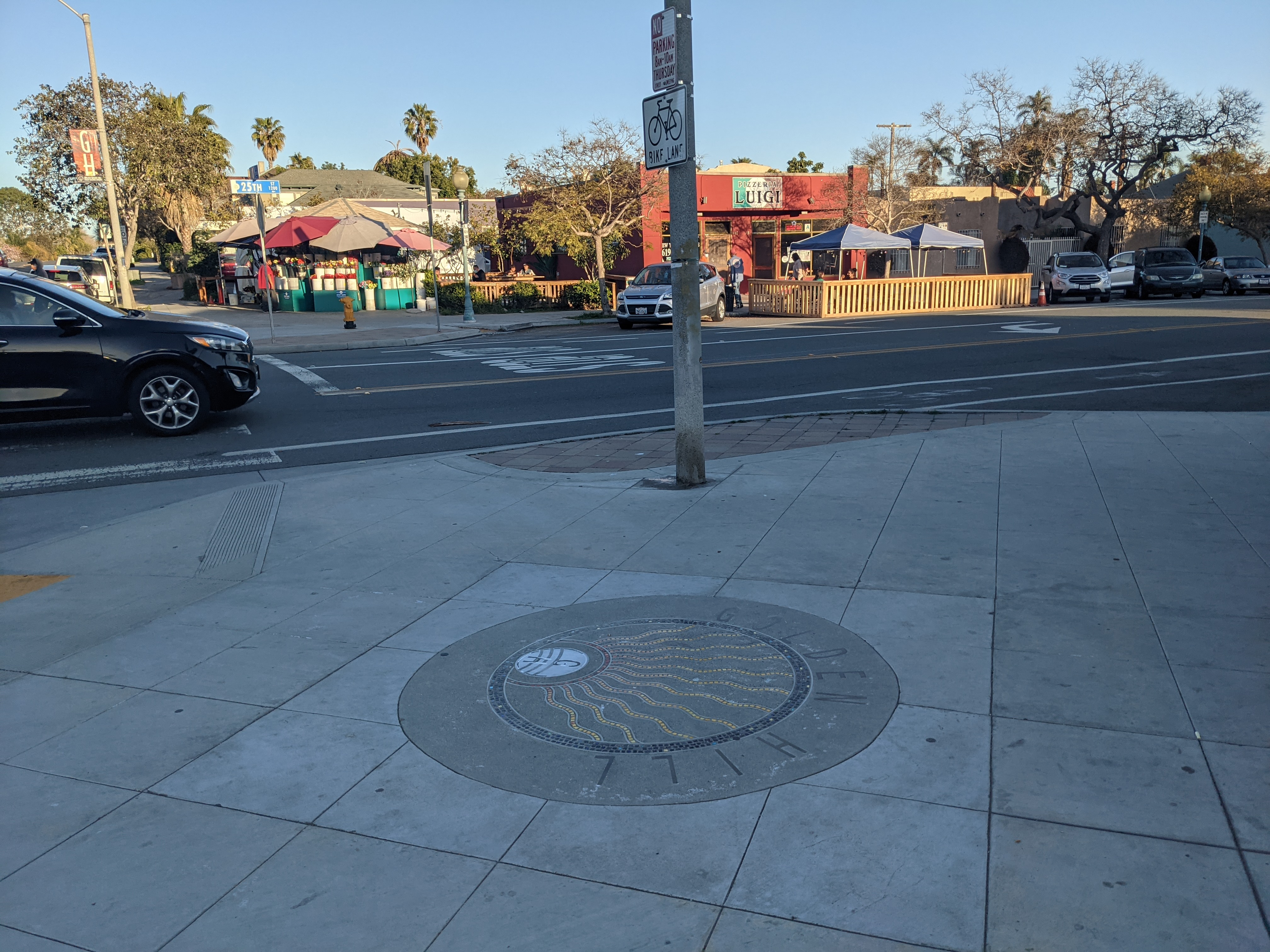
Intersection of 25th and C Streets in Golden Hill. Pizzeria Luigi is visible across 25th Street

The first Gay Center in San Diego, and second in the nation, was located at 2250 B St in the early 1970s. The original 1908 house is still there to this day.

Golden Hill is also host to two outdoor concerts a year, the Golden Hill Block Party and Kate Sessions Fest. The Golden Hill Block Party happens the last Saturday prior to Halloween. In 2006, the Kate Sessions Fest made its debut in Golden Hill Park. Both outdoor concerts are free, all-ages events, organized by local artists and musicians, featuring local bands.

Golden Hill was also the original home to the Women's History Museum and Educational Center, now located at Liberty Station, in Point Loma, which recently celebrated its 25th year as one of the only comprehensive women's history museums in the country. Portions of the area now known as Golden Hill were originally known as Brooklyn Heights. This area included the area from Fern and 28th street on the South to Fern and Grape street on the north, and from 30th Street on the west, east to the canyons. The school at 30th and Beech Streets was originally called Brooklyn School. The Presbyterian Church at 30th and Fir was originally called Brooklyn Heights Presbyterian Church. This name went out of usage in 1981 when an invitation was extended to two churches—Brooklyn Heights Presbyterian, established in 1921 and Golden Hill Presbyterian, established in 1956 (at 22nd and Market Streets)—to merge as Christ United Presbyterian Church of San Diego and each church accepted.
