= Grant Hill, San Diego =

- Community of San Diego
- Grant Hill
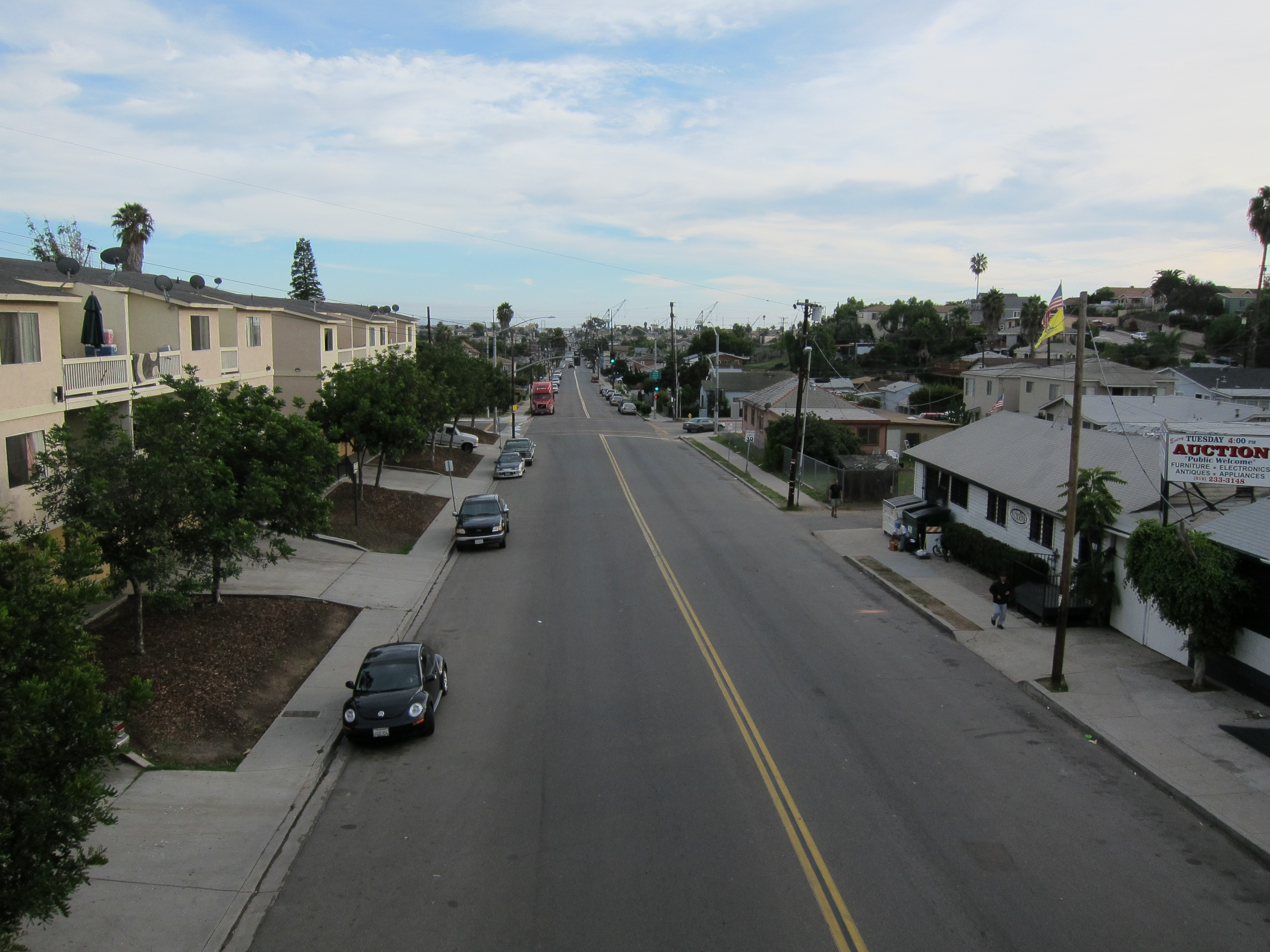
- Looking south into Grant Hill from Market and 28th Streets
- Nickname: "The Grant"
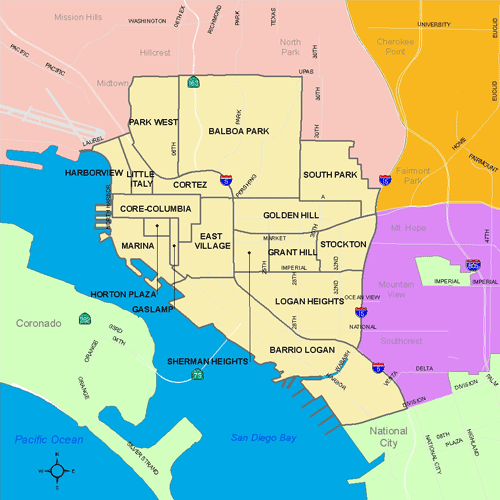
- Grant Hill is located in the central portion of the city of San Diego and part of the Southeastern Planning Area.

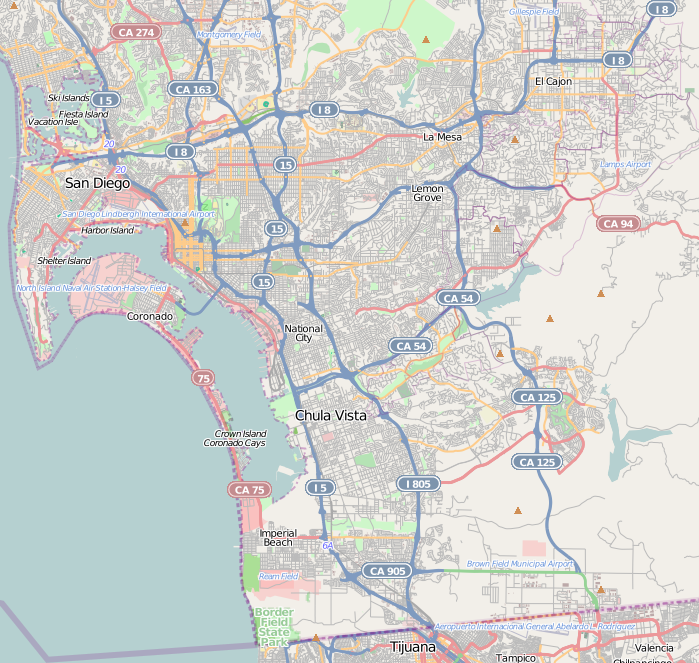
- Location within San Diego
- Coordinates: 32.7093°N 117.1338°W
- Country: United States of America
- State: California
- County: San Diego
- City: San Diego
- ZIP Code: 92102

Grant Hill is a neighborhood in central San Diego, California, bordered by Golden Hill to the north, Stockton to the east, Sherman Heights to the west, and Logan Heights to the south. 28th Street connects Grant Hill to the neighborhood of Golden Hill and Logan Heights running north to south. Grant Hill is part of the Southeastern Planning Area.
