= Mount Hope, San Diego =

- Community of San Diego
- Mount Hope
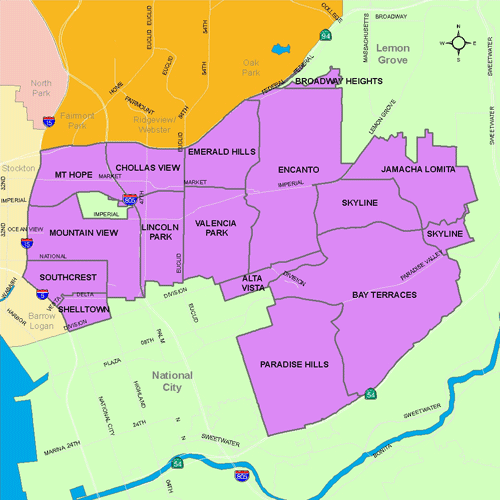
- Mount Hope is located in the southeastern area of the city of San Diego

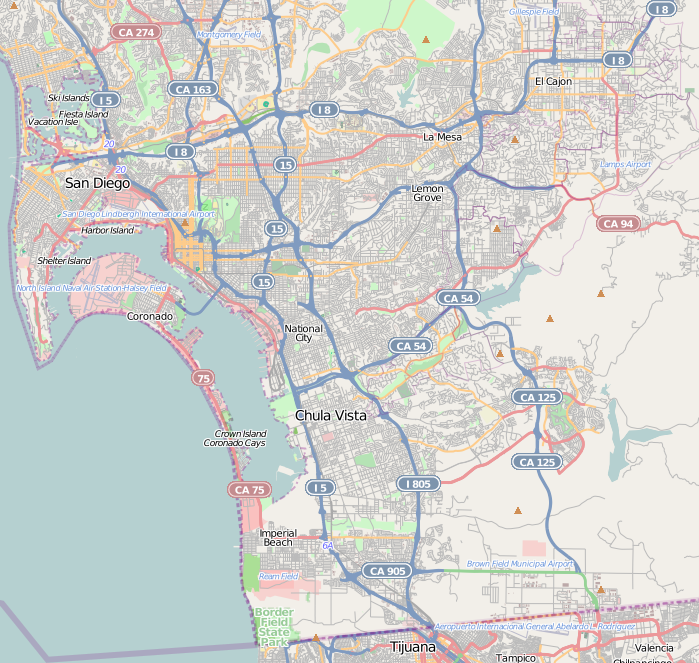
- Location within Southeast San Diego
- Coordinates: 32.7132°N 117.1118°W
- Country: United States of America
- State: California
- County: San Diego
- City: San Diego
- ZIP Code: 92102

Mount Hope is an ethnically diverse, hilly urban neighborhood in San Diego, California. Located in the southeastern portion of the city, Mount Hope is named for the large municipal Mount Hope Cemetery, which encompasses approximately 115 acres (0.47 km^{2}) of the community. The neighborhood contains a mixture of residential, industrial, commercial, and cemetery uses.

== Background ==
In 1869, a citizen committee Led by well known San Diego real estate developer Alonzo Horton was formed and voted to establish a new municipal cemetery name Mount Hope at 3751 Market St. which officially opened in 1871 The cemetery is located on an unincorporated area encompassing the Greenwood Cemetery, a private cemetery. Within Greenwood Cemetery, is the Cathedral Mausoleum which was built in 1919, which grew to the largest single building mausoleum in the world.

== Geography ==
State Route 94 (Martin Luther King Jr. Freeway) is the northern boundary, Interstate 805 is the eastern boundary, Interstate 15 is the western boundary, and Imperial Avenue is the southern boundary. The major San Diego thoroughfare Market Street runs through this community.

== Demographics ==
Mount Hope is a diverse neighborhood and home to one of the highest concentrations of Latinos in the City. Current demographics for the neighborhood are as follows: people of Hispanic/Latino heritage make up 77.0%, followed by African-Americans at 10.0%, Asian at 7.2%, non-Hispanic Whites 4.8%, and Mixed Race at 1.0%.

== Government ==
Mount Hope is located within the 9th City Council District, currently represented by Sean Elo-Rivera. It is part of the Southeastern San Diego Planning Area.

== Notable people ==
- The Toven Rapper/Producer/Song Writer
- Sagon Penn Martial Arts Expert

== Education ==
Mount Hope is served primarily by San Diego Unified School District.
