= Francis Grierson =

American musician

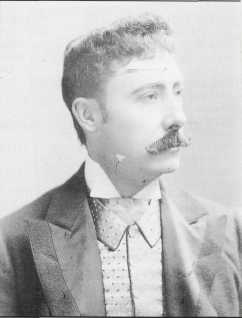
- Grierson c. 1890
- Born: Benjamin Henry Jesse Francis Shepard; September 18, 1848 Birkenhead, England
- Died: May 29, 1927 (aged 78) Los Angeles, California, US
- Occupation: Composer, pianist, writer
- Relatives: Benjamin Grierson (cousin)

Benjamin Henry Jesse Francis Shepard (September 18, 1848 – May 29, 1927) was a composer, pianist and writer who used the pen name Francis Grierson.

== Biography ==
Jesse was born in Birkenhead, England, to Joseph Shepard and Emily Grierson Shepard and his family migrated to Illinois, United States while he was still a baby. He was present at the Lincoln–Douglas debates in 1858 and later incorporated his reminiscences into his fictionalized autobiography The Valley of Shadows (1909). He worked as a page for John C. Frémont as a youth. In his youth he was "Jesse Shepard" or "Ben Shepard," but in 1899 adopted the pen name and was primarily known as "Francis Grierson" after that date.

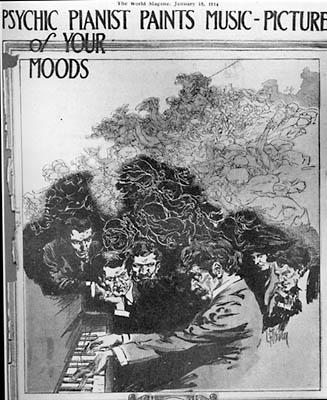
Francis Grierson as "Psychic Pianist" on the cover of The World magazine (1914)

=== Europe and spiritualism ===
Shepard traveled in Europe, finding audiences among royalty, and impressed the French novelist Alexandre Dumas fils. Shepard was described by contemporaries as tall, dark, handsome, and with hands that could reach over an octave on a piano keyboard. He became involved with Spiritualism while in Russia in the 1870s and stated that many of his musical performances were the result of the spirits of famous composers channeling through him.

=== Sexuality ===
It seems that Shepard primarily had romantic relationships with other men, but did not include descriptions of his sexuality in his writing or personal correspondence. He spent the majority of his adult life living with Lawrence Waldemar Tonner, a relationship that has been characterized in a variety of ways by later historians. He has been included in reference works on homosexuality and appears in scholarly works in the field of queer studies.

=== Tonner ===
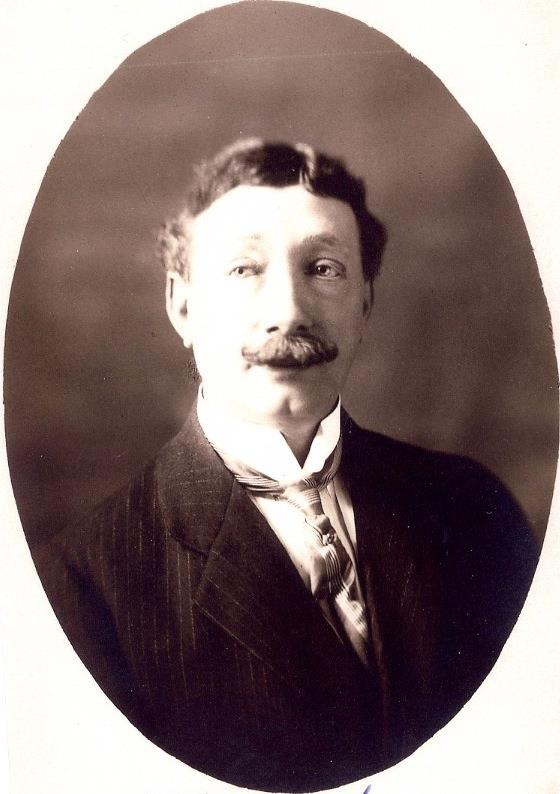
Lawrence Waldemar Tonner

In 1885, Shepard met Lawrence Waldemar Tonner, who became his friend, supporter, and partner for over 40 years. Tonner was born in Thisted, Denmark on October 15, 1861. He emigrated to the U.S. through Glasgow, Scotland in 1870 and became a naturalized citizen of the U.S. in 1875, in Chicago, Illinois. He worked as a manager, press secretary, interpreter, French teacher, and as a translator and aide for Herbert Hoover. Among the Waldemar Tonner Papers at ONE Archives, Los Angeles, is a letter recommending Tonner for a position with the Bureau of Public Information from Hoover, then head of the Food Administration. The letter was among Shepard's archived papers, which also included Tonner's credentials for the National Press Club of Washington, the Chevy-Chase Club and The University Club, Washington D.C., as well as Tonner's U.S. passport (issued in England by Robert Lincoln, son of the former president). Tonner died on May 25, 1947, in Los Angeles, California, and is buried at Inglewood Park Cemetery in Inglewood, California.

=== California and the Villa Montezuma ===
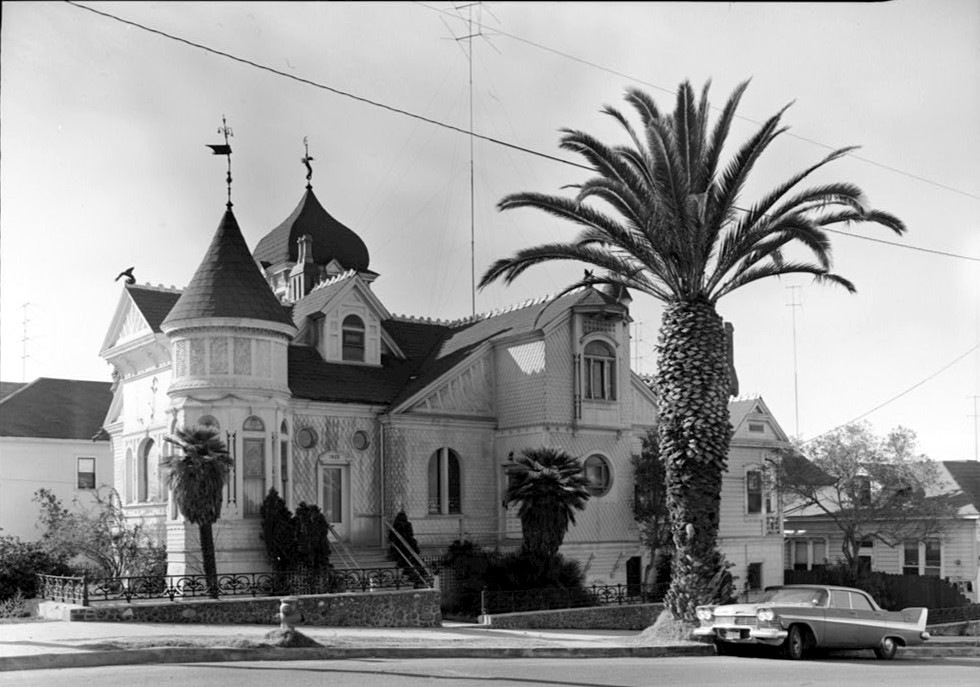
Villa Montezuma in 1964

Grierson had traveled through California previously in 1876 performing at several of the old religious missions founded by the Spanish. In the 1880s, He was invited to live in San Diego by a pair of real-estate developers, the High brothers, who enticed him by promising to build a mansion to his specifications. The result was the Villa Montezuma (named after The Montezuma, a migrant ship that first brought Shepard to America). Grierson held many séances at the home.

Despite his close association with Grierson, Tonner's name does not appear in the official documents by or about Grierson; for example, he is not listed in the San Diego City Directory as living at Villa Montezuma with Grierson. The two shared the home from July 1887 to the third quarter of 1888, before taking a mortgage out on the property to fund an initial trip to Paris for the publishing of Shepard's first book. They returned to San Diego in August 1889, and on finding the city's economic boom had ended, sold the home and its furnishings by mid-December. They had lived in San Diego for only two years.

== Writings ==
=== Spiritualist works ===
Grierson wrote on spiritualist topics throughout his life, from the early Modern Mysticism and Other Essays (1899) to his last book, Psycho-Phone Messages (1921).

=== Historical works ===
In his fictionalized autobiography The Valley of Shadows (1909), Grierson describes the antebellum world of the American Midwest, and characterizes Abraham Lincoln as a mystic prophesied by the appearance of the Comet Donati in 1858. He would later expand this view in his Abraham Lincoln, the Practical Mystic (1918).

=== Sociopolitical views ===
In his works such as The Invincible Alliance (1913), Grierson supported stronger Anglo-American ties, which, after the alliance developed in World War I, caused many authors to retroactively praise his work. To Grierson, this alliance was necessary to protect "Anglo-Saxon civilisation in the West" against "the menace of the yellow races," furthering the racist ideology of Yellow Peril. Grierson also held anti-German views and often denigrated German culture and the "Teutonic race" in his works. He presented the "Celtic race" as the foil to the "Teutonic race." In The Illusions and Realities of the War (1918), Grierson describes how only Anglo-American unity could prevent another world war.

== Final years and death ==
Grierson and Tonner returned to Paris in 1889, where they lived until 1896. After Paris, Grierson and Tonner settled in London until 1913, when they decided to return to the United States. In 1920, they settled in Los Angeles, which remained home for the rest of their lives. After their years of traveling the world together, Grierson lost his popularity and Tonner, who taught French and worked in a tailoring shop, supported him. Grierson died in Los Angeles on May 29, 1927, immediately after playing the last chord of a piano performance entertaining friends who had invited him to dinner; he was still upright with his hands on the keys and it was Tonner who first noticed that something was wrong. In newspaper announcements at the time of his death, it was noted that the once-successful Grierson had been living in poverty. Grierson's body was cremated.

== Partial bibliography ==
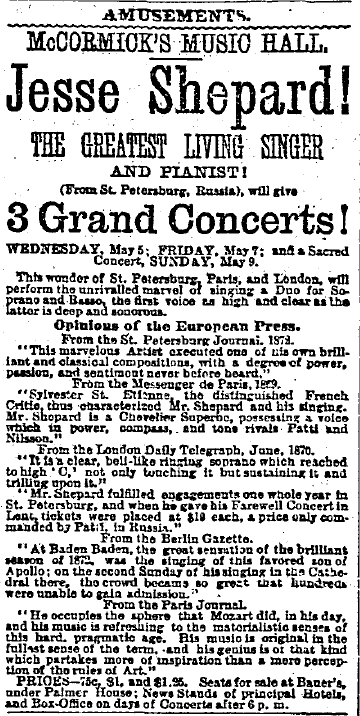
1875 advertisement for Jesse Shepard concert in Chicago

- Essays and Pen-Pictures (Pensées et Essais) (T Symonds (Paris) 1889)
- Modern Mysticism and Other Essays (London: G. Allen, 1899)
- The Celtic Temperament (George Allen 1901)
- The Valley of Shadows (Constable; Houghton Mifflin 1909)
- The Humour of the Underman (Stephen Swift 1911)
- Parisian Portraits (Stephen Swift 1911)
- La Vie et les hommes (Stephen Swift 1911)
- The Invincible Alliance and Other Essays (1913)
- Abraham Lincoln, the Practical Mystic (John Lane 1918)
- Illusions and Realities of the War (John Lane 1918)
- Psycho-Phone Messages (B. F. Austin 1921)
