= Sagon Penn =

San Diego martial arts expert (1962–2002)

Sagon Penn (1962 – July 4, 2002) was a martial arts expert from Southeast San Diego who worked as a karate teacher and also mentored inner-city children in the early 1980s. Penn was subsequently acquitted for the 1985 controversial shooting death of a San Diego police officer, the attempted murder of another officer and the attempted murder of a civilian ride along.

== Multiple altercations and death of officer Riggs ==
In 1985, Penn's vehicle was pulled over in the Encanto area during a traffic stop by San Diego Police officers Thomas Riggs and Donovan Jacobs. Civilian police ride along Sara Pina-Ruiz was in the squad car when a physical altercation ensued, resulting in Penn disarming Riggs, subsequently shooting and killing Riggs with his own service revolver, and shooting and injuring Pina-Ruiz. Penn also shot and wounded Jacobs and ran him over with the police squad car while fleeing the scene. Later that day Penn voluntarily surrendered himself to Police.

== Trials ==
Represented by defense attorney Milton Silverman Penn argued that he feared for his life and acted in self-defense after being attacked and beaten. Penn was acquitted in 1986 on the more serious murder charge for killing Riggs. In a second trial in 1987, Penn was acquitted of all lesser charges. San Diego Police, including then police chief Bill Kolender, publicly criticized the district attorney for not seeking the death penalty against Penn. During the first trial, the prosecution argued that Penn shot the officers to escape arrest.

== Community review board on police practices ==
After the final verdicts, Superior Court Judge J. Morgan Lester gave unflinching criticism of the San Diego Police Department conduct in the case. As a direct result of the shooting and criticism of misconduct raised by the courts, former Mayor Roger Hedgecock and City Council members at the time appointed citizens to a Citizens Advisory Board which ultimately led to the formation of the Community Review Board on Police Practices.

== Death ==
On July 4, 2002, Sagon Penn reportedly took his own life in what authorities determined was a suicide overdose.

In 1988, officer Doyle Wheeler, who testified in support of Sagon during the trial that officer Jacobs was a "racist hothead," was assaulted in his home in Washington State by masked assailants, who tied him up and burned him with cigarettes before making him write an apology letter to the officers involved in the altercation with Penn. They then shot him in the head but he survived. The San Diego police chief denied any of their officers were involved and accused Wheeler of staging the attack. Wheeler claimed he recognized one of the men as an informant in San Diego. Wheeler had retired to Washington state because of post traumatic stress and threats against his life.
