= Villa Montezuma =

Queen Anne style mansion in San Diego, California

- U.S. National Register of Historic Places
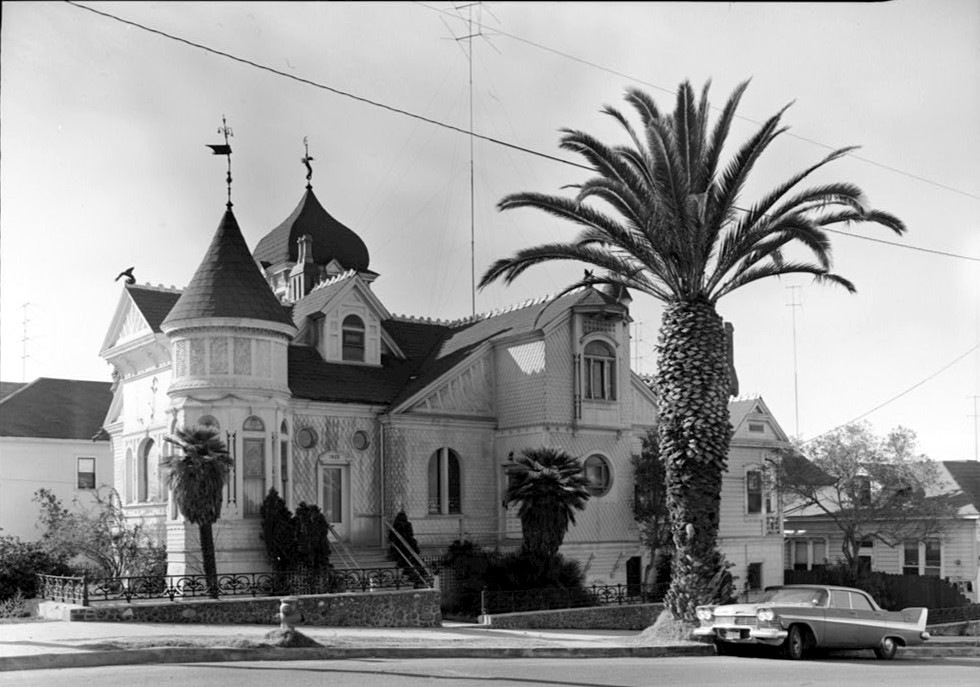

- Location within California Location within the United States
- Location: 1925 K Street, San Diego, California
- Coordinates: 32°42′29″N 117°8′46″W
- Area: Less than one acre
- Built: 1887
- Architects: Comstock and Trotsche
- Architectural style: Queen Anne, Gothic, Exotic Revival
- Website: www.villamontezumamuseum.org
- NRHP reference No.: 71000183
- Added to NRHP: May 6, 1971

Villa Montezuma is a Queen Anne style mansion in the Sherman Heights neighborhood of San Diego, California, that was added to the National Register of Historic Places in 1971.

== Jesse Shepard residence ==
The home was built in 1887 by Cheney & Leonard and designed by Comstock & Trotsche for Jesse Shepard, who lived there for about a year before relocating to Paris, then sold it in late 1889. John Mallon's Pacific American Decorative Company made windows for the mansion.

== Seances ==
First owner of the Villa Montezuma, Jessie Shepard, would perform seances in the house during parties claiming to summon the spirits of famous composers, Beethoven and Mozart. From 1906 to 1909, George W. Montgomery and his wife resided in the Villa Montezuma. Mrs. Montgomery was a medium and also held seances in the house after Jessie's ownership.

== Rumors and legends ==
People claim that the house is haunted by two spirits. Jessie Shepard himself, and a butler who died by suicide in the home. During tours, people also claim to have seen a woman in white in the upstairs part of the house where she is frequently spotted by onlookers on the balcony looking over the main staircase. During tours, people have mentioned feeling unexplainable cold spots, shadowy figures and a feeling of being watched. There are also accounts of hearing the piano playing inside the house late at night. Throughout the house's history there have been talks about curses of financial ruin. Bankruptcies, financial losses and sudden misfortunes have occurred to past owners of the home.

== Owners ==
- 1887–1889: Jesse Shepard
- 1889–1890: David D. Dare
- 1890–1893: H.P. Palmerston
- 1894–1900: Villard Washington Whitney
- 1900–1906: Dr. George Calmus
- 1906–1909: Mr. and Mrs. George W. Montgomery and Mr. Guy C. White
- 1909–1942: Frank and Georgia Lynch
- 1942–1948: James and Flora Craig
- 1948: Edward Campbell
- 1948–1950: I. Hanson and W.C. McPhail
- 1950–1968: Carl and Amelia Yaeger
- 1968–1971: Kay Porter, Nick Fintzelberg, and friends (all historical society members)
- 1971–present: City of San Diego

In 1942 the land was split into two properties: Shepherds Lot/Garden and the main Villa.

== Friends of Villa Montezuma ==
In 1969, five members of what is now known as the San Diego History Center began work to arrange for the city's purchase of the house for use as a museum and cultural center. After opening for such purpose on November 12, 1972, a volunteer organization known as the Friends of Villa Montezuma (FOVM) continued for the next four decades to maintain the property as a house museum. Hundreds of weddings were held at the museum over that time, providing a steady source of revenue for the historical society. An accidental fire in March 1986 went through the second floor and destroyed over half of the roof, though a restored museum opened again in late June 1987 in time for the house's 100th anniversary. Amid an economic downturn and building foundation safety concerns, the museum closed to the public in 2006 and the FOVM centered on raising funds for a much needed restoration, incorporating that year as an independent 501(c)(3) organization.

== Tours ==
From 2015 through 2020, to satisfy requirements of a federal CDBG grant that was used to restore the foundation, roof, and chimneys, the museum was open four mornings a year for free interior tours, approximately quarterly, with visitor registration via the San Diego Parks and Recreation Department.

As of October 2021, the museum reopened for regular paid tours.
