= Logan Heights, San Diego =

- Community of San Diego
- Logan Heights
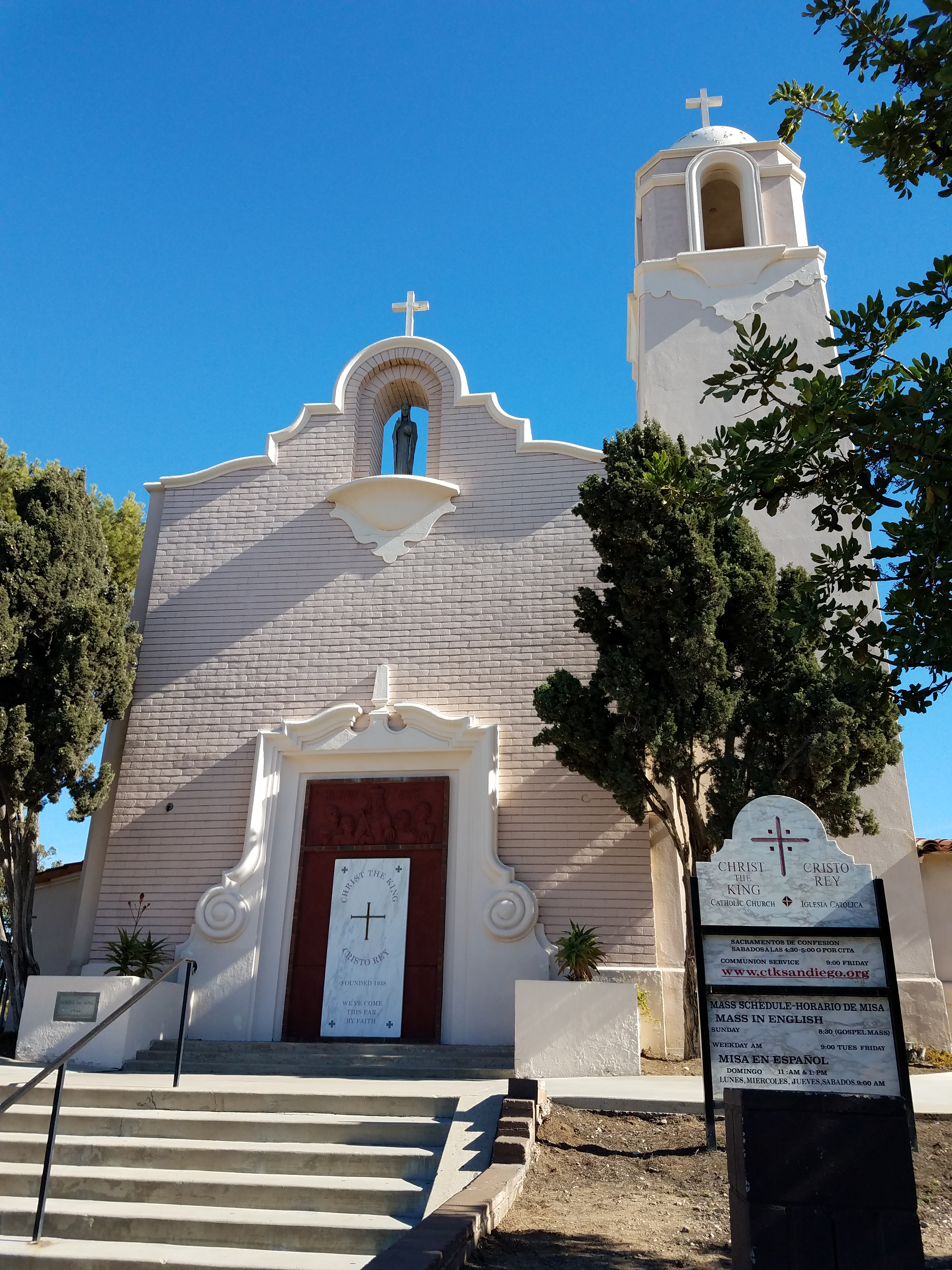
- Nicknames: "Varrio Logan Heights", "L.H."
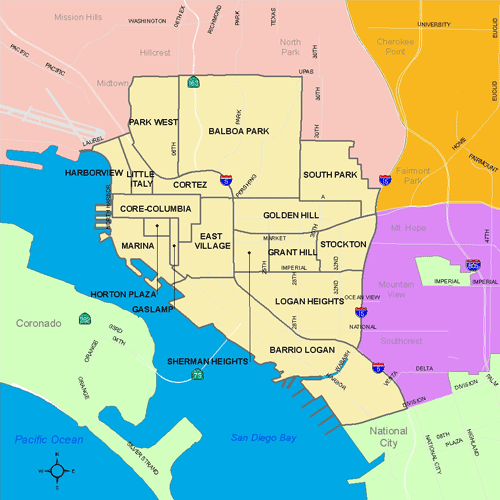
- Logan Heights is located in the central portion of the city of San Diego and part of the Southeastern Planning Area.

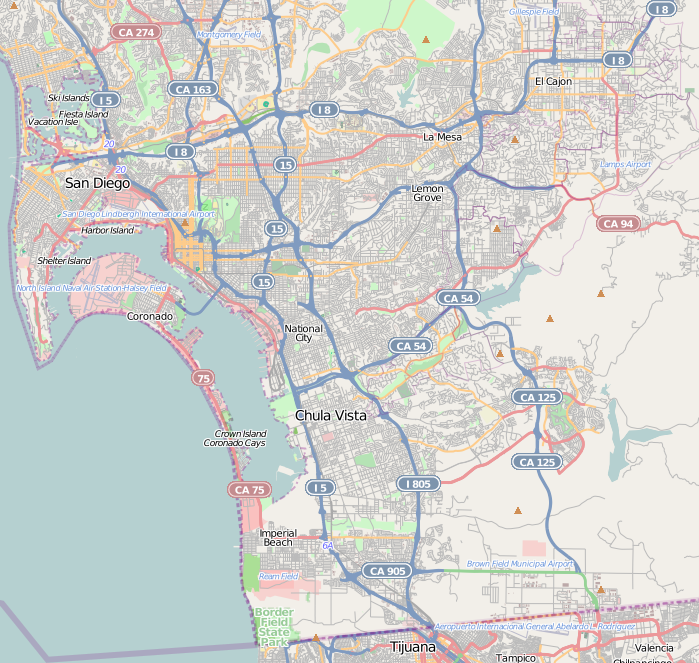
- Location within San Diego
- Coordinates: 32.6986°N 117.1294°W
- Country: United States of America
- State: California
- County: San Diego
- City: San Diego
- ZIP Code: 92113

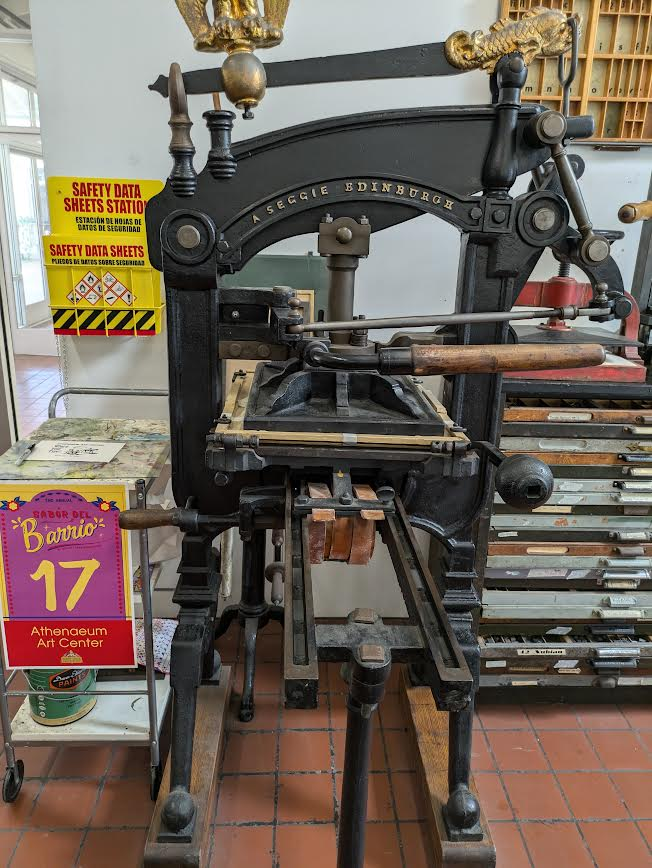
An antique printer located at the Bread & Salt Community Art Center on September 12th, 2024.

Logan Heights is an urban neighborhood in central San Diego, California. It is bordered by Interstate 5 on the south and west, Interstate 15 on the east, and Imperial Avenue on the north. It is part of the Southeastern Planning Area.

== History ==
In 1871, Congressman John A. Logan wrote legislation to provide federal land grants and subsidies for a transcontinental railroad ending in San Diego. A street laid in 1881 was named Logan Heights after him, and the name came to be applied to the general area. Plans for a railroad never successfully materialized, and the area was predominantly residential by the start of the 20th century, becoming one of San Diego's oldest communities. Its transformation began in 1910 with the influx of refugees of the Mexican Revolution, who soon became the majority ethnic group. For this reason, the southern part of the original Logan Heights neighborhood came to be called Barrio Logan.

== Demographics ==
Logan Heights is home to one of the highest concentrations of Latinos in the City. Current demographics for the neighborhood are as follows: people of Hispanic/Latino heritage make up 87.6%, followed by African-Americans at 7.1%, then non-Hispanic Whites at 3.7%, Asian at 1.4%, and others at 0.1%

== Governance ==
It is part of City Council District 8 and is represented by Councilwoman Vivian Moreno. The city is currently (2010) updating the community plan.

== Culture ==
Barrio Logan is known as the home of Chicano Park. A new Logan Heights branch of the San Diego Public Library opened in 2007.

== See also ==
- Chicano Park
- Logan Heights Gang
