= Harbor Drive Pedestrian Bridge =

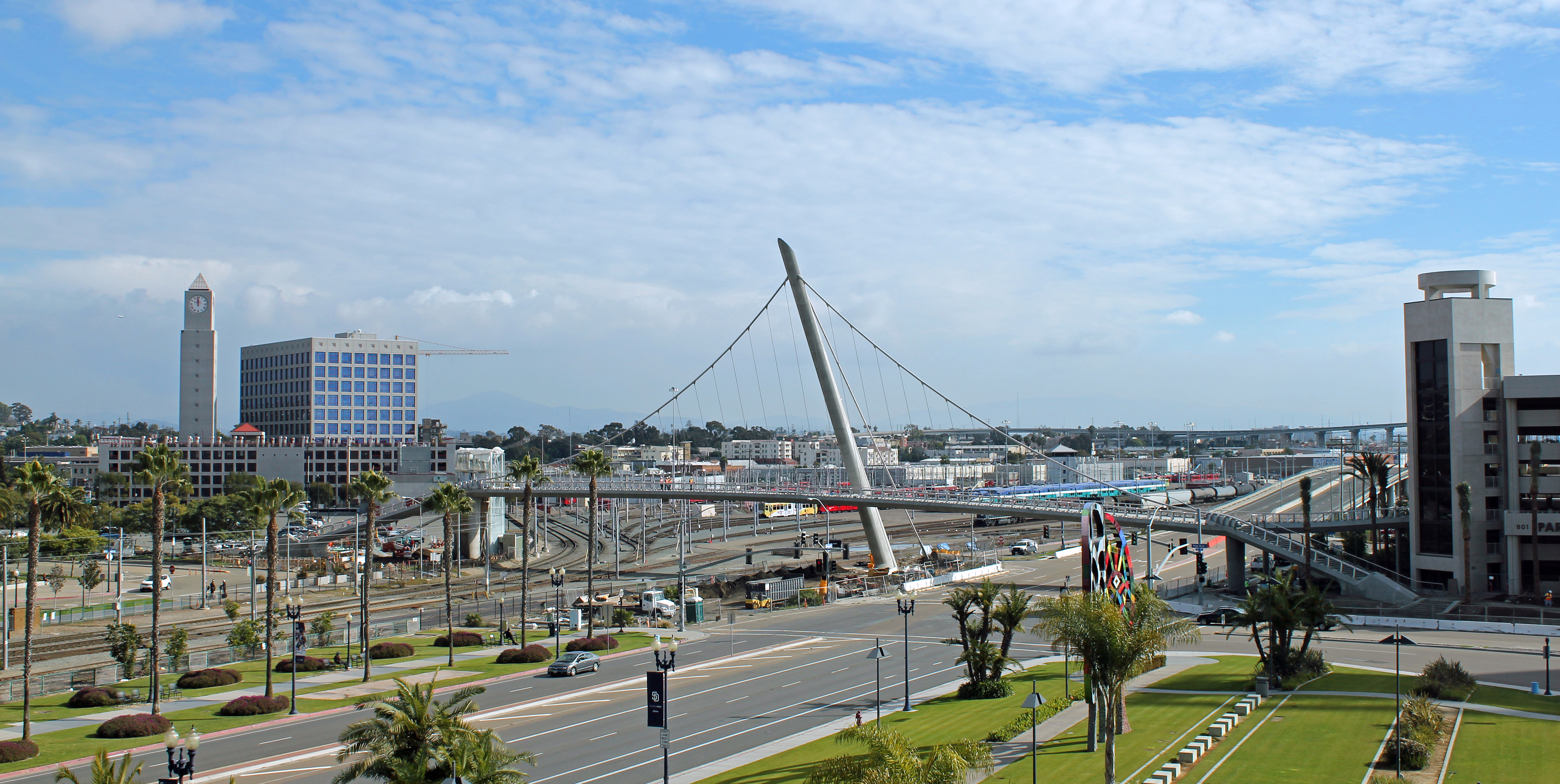
- Coordinates: 32.7050°N 117.1570°W
- Carries: Pedestrian traffic
- Crosses: Harbor Drive, San Diego Trolley tracks, and San Diego and Arizona Eastern Railroad tracks
- Locale: San Diego, California, U.S.

Characteristics
- Design: Self-anchored suspension bridge
- Total length: 550 feet (168 m)
- Width: 16 feet (5 m)
- Longest span: 354 feet (108 m)
- Clearance below: 25 feet (8 m)

History
- Architect: Safdie Rabines Architects
- Engineering design by: T.Y. Lin International
- Opened: March 18, 2011

Harbor Drive Pedestrian Bridge is a self-anchored suspension bridge in San Diego, California. A pedestrian and bicycle crossing, it spans the San Diego Trolley and San Diego and Arizona Eastern Railway in downtown San Diego. The bridge connects otherwise disconnected segments of Park Boulevard, allowing pedestrians easier access between East Village and the waterfront. It is 550 feet (170 m) long, which makes it one of the longest self-anchored pedestrian bridges in the world. The span measures 350 feet (110 m) while the remainder is approaches.

Completed in March 2011, the bridge was built to allow pedestrian traffic on Park Boulevard to safely cross six sets of railroad tracks and Harbor Drive. The bridge also completes the "Park to Bay Link", a long term vision of city planners to develop a public parkway or green belt along Park Boulevard in order to connect Balboa Park with San Diego Bay. The bridge crosses over six lanes of traffic on Harbor Drive, a rail yard and trolley tracks, and is adjacent to Petco Park and the San Diego Convention Center. It is accessible by stairs and elevators.

The bridge was built by Reyes Construction, Inc. T.Y. Lin International engineered the project, and Safdie Rabines Architects was project architect. It cost $26.8 million and was funded in part by a $6 million grant from the California Transportation Commission. The bridge is suspended from a single 131-foot-tall (40 m) pylon set into the ground at a 60-degree angle. The unusual, iconic structure features a curved concrete deck that is suspended only on the deck's inside curve by a single pair of suspension cables. The bridge was constructed using stainless steel and has lighting above and below the deck. It has been described as "a sleek, nautically themed bridge with a very nice view of the city".
