= Flagship Ferry =

Passenger ferry service on San Diego Bay, California

- Cabrillo at Broadway Pier
- Locale: San Diego, Coronado, and Chula Vista, CA
- Waterway: San Diego Bay
- Transit type: Passenger ferry
- Owner: Flagship Cruises & Events
- Operator: Flagship Cruises & Events
- Began operation: July 1, 1987
- Predecessor: San Diego and Coronado Ferry Company (1886–1969)
- No. of lines: 3
- No. of vessels: 3
- No. of terminals: 4
- Website: flagshipsd.com

Flagship Ferry, also known as the San Diego–Coronado Ferry or the Coronado Ferry, is a passenger ferry service on San Diego Bay in California. It is operated by Flagship Cruises & Events and connects downtown San Diego with Coronado and Chula Vista. Boats run from Broadway Pier and from Fifth Avenue Landing, behind the San Diego Convention Center, to the Coronado Ferry Landing, and from Fifth Avenue Landing to Chula Vista.

Ferries carried passengers and vehicles between San Diego and Coronado from 1886 until the San Diego–Coronado Bridge opened in 1969. The Star & Crescent Boat Company, Flagship's predecessor, ran a separate ferry to North Island from 1918 to 1969 and restored passenger service to Coronado in 1987. The two Coronado ferries, Silvergate (1940) and Cabrillo (1964), were listed on the National Register of Historic Places (NRHP) in 2025.

== History ==
=== San Diego and Coronado Ferry Company (1886–1969) ===
In April 1886, Elisha S. Babcock Jr. and Hampton L. Story, the developers of the Hotel del Coronado, formed the San Diego and Coronado Ferry Company to carry people from San Diego to the Coronado peninsula. Before the company had a ferry, workmen crossed the bay on a barge towed by Story's 21-foot (6.4 m) steam yacht Della. The first ferry, the side-wheel steamer Coronado, arrived on August 19, 1886. It cost $15,000 and could carry 600 people and 13 teams of horses.

In 1948 the company and the San Diego Electric Railway were sold to Jesse Haugh, and the City of San Diego bought both in 1967. Under an agreement dated November 16, 1966, the ferry company sold its five ferries (San Diego, Coronado, North Island, Silver Strand and Crown City), its terminals and its franchises to the California Department of Public Works, a predecessor of Caltrans. It also agreed to end all ferry service on the bay once the toll bridge opened. The California Public Utilities Commission (CPUC) approved the sale in April 1969. To make the bridge bonds more attractive to buyers, the state had promised that no competing service would operate within 10 miles (16 km) of the crossing. The last ferry ran at 11:59 p.m. on August 2, 1969, one minute before the bridge opened.

=== Star & Crescent and the North Island ferry (1915–1969) ===
Rufus M. Creswell bought the Star Boat Company, which ran harbor excursions, in 1908. In 1915 it merged with the Crescent Boat Company under the leadership of Oakley J. Hall to form the Star & Crescent Boat Company. In 1918 the company began a passenger ferry between San Diego and North Island. The fare was five cents, and the boats were known locally as "nickel-snatchers" through the 1940s. The CPUC certified the route in 1925.

Between 1940 and 1944 the company built six ferries for wartime North Island traffic, including Silvergate, which was built in 1940 and entered service in 1941. In 1954 the North Island route passed to an affiliate, the Star & Crescent Ferry Company. The fare rose to 10 cents in 1955 and to 15 cents in 1968. In the 12 months ending September 30, 1967, the route carried 3,716,449 passengers. The North Island ferry also ended in 1969, and Silvergate was moved to harbor excursions and educational cruises. The Engel family bought Star & Crescent in 1984.

=== Return of service (1987–present) ===
The bridge's construction bonds were paid off in 1986. On February 11, 1987, the CPUC granted Star & Crescent authority to operate as a vessel common carrier between downtown San Diego and Coronado's Old Ferry Landing development. Passenger service resumed on July 1, 1987. Boats ran from the company's dock at the foot of Broadway to a new pier in Coronado, and Silvergate operated the first sailings. Cabrillo, built as an excursion boat, joined the ferry service later. The city's staff report gives 1987, but the vessel's National Register nomination states that it stayed in excursion and charter work into the early 1990s. The one-way fare was raised from $1.50 to $2.00 in 1992.

The company was renamed San Diego Harbor Excursion in 1990 and Flagship Cruises & Events in 2011. From 1999 to 2010 the ferry also called at North Island; the stop was dropped because of security and funding problems. Since 1993 the City of Coronado has paid for fare-free weekday morning commuter sailings.

In February 2024 the CPUC allowed Flagship to change fares by up to 15 percent on 10 days' notice, and the fare rose to $9 on June 28, 2024. The company attributed the increase to higher wages and fuel prices and to lower ridership.

A route between Fifth Avenue Landing and the Chula Vista Bayfront opened on June 1, 2026. Port of San Diego board chair Anne Moore said a ferry terminal had been part of the Chula Vista Bayfront Master Plan from its start.

== Service ==
Flagship Ferry terminals

Flagship operates three routes. Both Coronado routes take about 15 minutes. As of November 2026, one-way tickets cost $9 and are valid on any departure. The Chula Vista route takes about 45 minutes, and tickets cost $15 and are sold for a specific departure.

Flagship Ferry routes
Route	Opened	Travel time	Frequency	One-way fare
Broadway Pier – Coronado Ferry Landing	1987	15 minutes	Hourly	$9
Convention Center (Fifth Avenue) Landing – Coronado Ferry Landing	1987	15 minutes	Every 30 minutes	$9
Convention Center (Fifth Avenue) Landing – Chula Vista	2026	45 minutes	Six round trips daily	$15

The main decks of the two Coronado ferries are wheelchair accessible; the boat on the Chula Vista route is not.

=== Terminals ===
Ferry terminals
Terminal	Location	Connections
Broadway Pier	Downtown San Diego	MTS: Rapid Express 280, Rapid Express 290, 923, 992; Santa Fe Depot: Blue Line Green Line; Pacific Surfliner; Coaster; MTS: 83, Rapid 215, Rapid 225, Rapid 235
Convention Center (Fifth Avenue) Landing	Gaslamp Quarter	Gaslamp Quarter station: Green Line Silver Line
Coronado Ferry Landing	Coronado	MTS: 904
Chula Vista Ferry Landing	Chula Vista	Chula Vista Bayfront Shuttle (Green)

== Fleet ==
Current fleet
Name	Built	Passengers	Length	Notes
Silvergate	1940	219	65 feet (20 m)	Coronado routes; listed on the NRHP
Cabrillo	1964	261	74 feet (23 m)	Coronado routes; listed on the NRHP
Balboa	Unknown	32	30 feet (9.1 m)	Chula Vista route

Silvergate carried passengers on the North Island route until 1969 and then ran harbor excursions until it returned to ferry service in 1987.

Cabrillo was designed by Oakley J. Hall and made its first voyage on June 19, 1964. It has a steel hull and was built as a 54-foot (16 m) excursion boat with room for 350 passengers. In 1968 the hull was cut and lengthened by about 20 feet (6.1 m), and in 2001 the boat was given new engines.

Both ferries were listed on the NRHP on April 3, 2025, and the listing was announced in January 2026. Silvergate was listed under Criterion A for its role in World War II and postwar maritime transportation and recreation. Cabrillo was listed under Criterion A for its excursion service from 1964 to 1968 and under Criterion B for its association with Hall.

Balboa is a 30-foot (9.1 m) diesel boat with a speed of 10 knots (19 km/h; 12 mph), used on the Chula Vista route since it opened.

=== Electric ferries ===
In March 2025 the California Air Resources Board awarded Flagship a grant through its Advanced Technology Demonstration and Pilot Project program to build two battery-electric ferries for the Coronado routes. The project was expected to cost about $21 million, and the first boat was to be delivered as early as the third quarter of 2026. The state grant totals $15.27 million and Flagship is contributing $5.5 million. The boats were designed by Aurora Marine Design and will each carry 275 passengers. Flagship invited shipyards to bid on construction on December 5, 2025. The new boats are planned to replace Silvergate and Cabrillo on the same routes. As of November 2026, Flagship gives 2027 as the target date for the first electric ferry.

== See also ==
- Transportation in San Diego County
