= Big Bay Boom =

San Diego fireworks display that occurs yearly on Independence Day

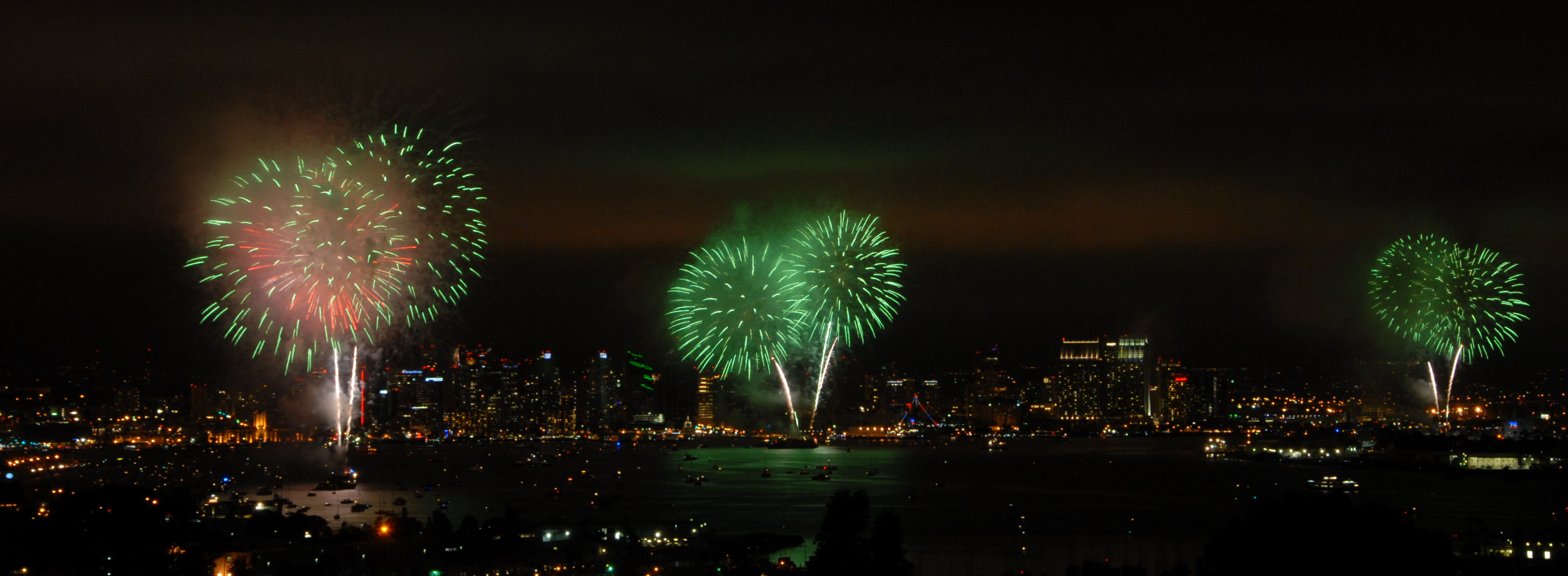
- Big Bay Boom fireworks on July 4, 2013
- Genre: Fireworks display
- Dates: July 4 (Independence Day)
- Frequency: Annually
- Locations: San Diego, California
- Country: United States
- Years active: 2001–2019, 2021–present
- Founded: July 4, 2001
- Attendance: ≈ 500,000
- Website: bigbayboom.com

The Big Bay Boom is an annual Independence Day fireworks display in San Diego, California. The event has been put on since 2001. It is claimed to be one of the largest annual fireworks displays in the United States. It is "one of the most logistically complex displays in the world"; from 2010 through 2012 it spanned 14 miles and five locations. The primary sponsor is the Port of San Diego. Since 2014, the fireworks are presented by Pyro Spectaculars, which acquired former presenter San Diego Fireworks. Each year, roughly half a million people congregate on the shores of San Diego Bay to watch the show.

== History ==
For many years there has been a fireworks display over San Diego Bay from the city of Coronado, California. Sandy Purdon, a marina owner and former president of the Port Tenants Association, got the idea to do a similar but larger fireworks show from the San Diego side of the bay. He recruited financial support from other bayside business owners and brought the Port of San Diego on board with financial and in-kind support. The first display in 2001 involved fireworks from two barges in San Diego Bay. The event grew to involve three barges in 2004 and four barges in 2005. In 2010 the Imperial Beach pier was added as a fifth location. However, in 2013 the city of Imperial Beach withdrew from participation, leaving the four Bay locations.

2020 saw the officials scrap the show due to the COVID-19 pandemic. A TV special was aired in its place.

== Description ==
The four barges are located in San Diego Bay adjacent to Shelter Island, Harbor Island, North Embarcadero, and South Embarcadero. All four locations shoot off identical, simultaneous pyrotechnics, coordinated with a patriotic sound track played over a local radio station. As of 2019, the broadcast rights are held by CHR station KHTS-FM.

Purdon continues as the executive producer through a company he started for the purpose, H. P. Purdon & Co. The event is underwritten by financial contributions by many businesses and organizations. Any excess revenues are contributed to the San Diego Armed Services YMCA, a non-profit that provides services to military service members and their families at three locations in Murphy Canyon, Naval Medical Center San Diego, and Naval Base San Diego.

== Legal issues ==
Starting in 2010 the future of the fireworks show has been called into question due to threatened legal action by the Coastal Environmental Rights Foundation, which claims that additional pollution and environmental permits are required for fireworks displays. The Foundation to date has not filed any legal action against the Big Bay Boom, proceeding instead with a series of legal actions against a fireworks show in La Jolla.

== 2012 incident ==
The Wednesday, July 4, 2012 show, coordinated by Garden State Fireworks, went unexpectedly awry, with around 7,000 shells intended for a 17-minute display, discharged prematurely and simultaneously from all four barges and the pier. The entire cache exploded in less than a minute.

The coordinated fireworks are triggered by a computer, and the premature discharge was blamed on a corrupted computer file. There were no injuries; workers on the barges took refuge in metal shelters designed for their protection. Garden State Fireworks apologized and promised to do a future show for free. The accident went viral on the internet.
