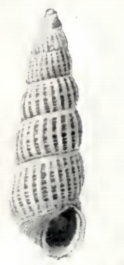
- Drawing of a shell of Turbonilla eva

Scientific classification
- Kingdom: Animalia
- Phylum: Mollusca
- Class: Gastropoda
- Family: Pyramidellidae
- Genus: Turbonilla
- Species: T. eva

Binomial name
- Turbonilla eva Bartsch, 1917

Synonyms
- Turbonilla (Pyrgiscus) eva Bartsch, 1917

= Turbonilla eva =

Species of gastropod

Turbonilla eva is a species of sea snail, a marine gastropod mollusk in the family Pyramidellidae, the pyrams and their allies.

== Description ==
The small shell has an elongate conic shape. Its length measures 4.3 mm. It has a pale brown ground color, with the incised spiral lines red. The whorls of the protoconch are decollated. The seven whorls of the teleoconch are gently rounded, on the posterior three-quarters of the shell sloping more abruptly toward the suture. They are marked by moderately strong, well-rounded, almost vertical axial ribs, of which 22 occur upon the third and fourth, 24 upon the fifth, and 26 upon the penultimate turn. The intercostal spaces are a little narrower than the ribs, crossed by 11 strongly incised spiral grooves, which are of varying width. Of these the fourth, seventh, and eleventh are of equal strength and much wider than any of the rest. The remaining, with the exception of the sixth, which is a mere incised line, are of almost equal strength. In spacing the first is about as far below the summit as that is distant from the second, and these two spaces are a little wider than the spaces between the third and fourth, the fifth and sixth, and the seventh and eighth, which are equal and follow next in strength, the remaining spaces are subequal and a little narrower. The suture is quite strongly constricted. The periphery of the body whorl is inflated, and well rounded. The base of the shell is moderately long, and well rounded. It is marked by the feeble continuations of the axial ribs, which become evanescent before reaching the middle of the base, and 13 subequally spaced incised spiral lines, of which the first three below the periphery are interrupted by the ribs. The aperture is oval. The posterior angle is obtuse. The outer lip is very thin. The inner lip is slightly curved, reflected over and appressed to the base. The parietal wall is covered with a thin callus.

== Distribution ==
The type specimen was found in the Pacific Ocean off San Diego Bay, California.
