= Turbonilla clarinda =

Scientific classification
- Kingdom: Animalia
- Phylum: Mollusca
- Class: Gastropoda
- Family: Pyramidellidae
- Genus: Turbonilla
- Species: T. clarinda

Binomial name
- Turbonilla clarinda Bartsch, 1912

Synonyms
- Turbonilla (Chemnitzia) clarinda Bartsch, 1912

Species of gastropod

Turbonilla clarinda is a species of sea snail; a marine gastropod mollusk in the family Pyramidellidae, the pyrams and their allies.

== Description ==
The bluish-white shell is semi translucent and has an elongate-conic shape. Its length is 4.7 mm. The 2½ whorls of the protoconch form a rather solute, elevated, helicoid spire. Its axis is at right angles to the succeeding turns, in the first of which it is slightly immersed. The ten whorls of the teleoconch are well rounded and appressed at the summit. They are marked by very regular, rounded, slightly protractive axial ribs, of which 16 occurs on the first to seventh, 18 upon the eight and the penultimate turn. These ribs become slightly flattened and somewhat expanded at the summit. The intercostal spaces are a little wider than the ribs and well impressed. They terminate a little posterior to the suture thus leaving a plain, narrow band immediately above the suture. The sutures are somewhat constricted. The periphery and the base of the body whorl are well rounded and smooth. The aperture is subquadrate. The posterior angle is obtuse. The outer lip is thin, showing the external sculpture within. The slender inner lip is slightlyt sinuous and very slightly revolute.

== Distribution ==
This species occurs in the Pacific Ocean off San Diego Bay, California.
