= Broadway Pier, San Diego =

Coordinates: 32.71572°N 117.17496°W

Broadway Pier
- Type: Passenger and cruise ship pier
- Carries: Pedestrians
- Spans: San Diego Bay
- Owner: Port of San Diego
- Operator: Port of San Diego

Characteristics
- Construction: Reinforced concrete
- Total length: 1,000 feet (300 m)
- Width: 135 feet (41 m)

History
- Completion date: 1913

The Broadway Pier as it appeared in 1913. It has been remodeled at least twice since, in the 1970s and again in 2010.

Broadway Pier is a pier in San Diego, California, located on San Diego Bay at the intersection of Broadway and North Harbor Drive. It houses the Port Pavilion, one of San Diego's two cruise ship terminals, which opened in 2010 and is also used as an event venue. The pier is a terminal for the Flagship Ferry to Coronado.

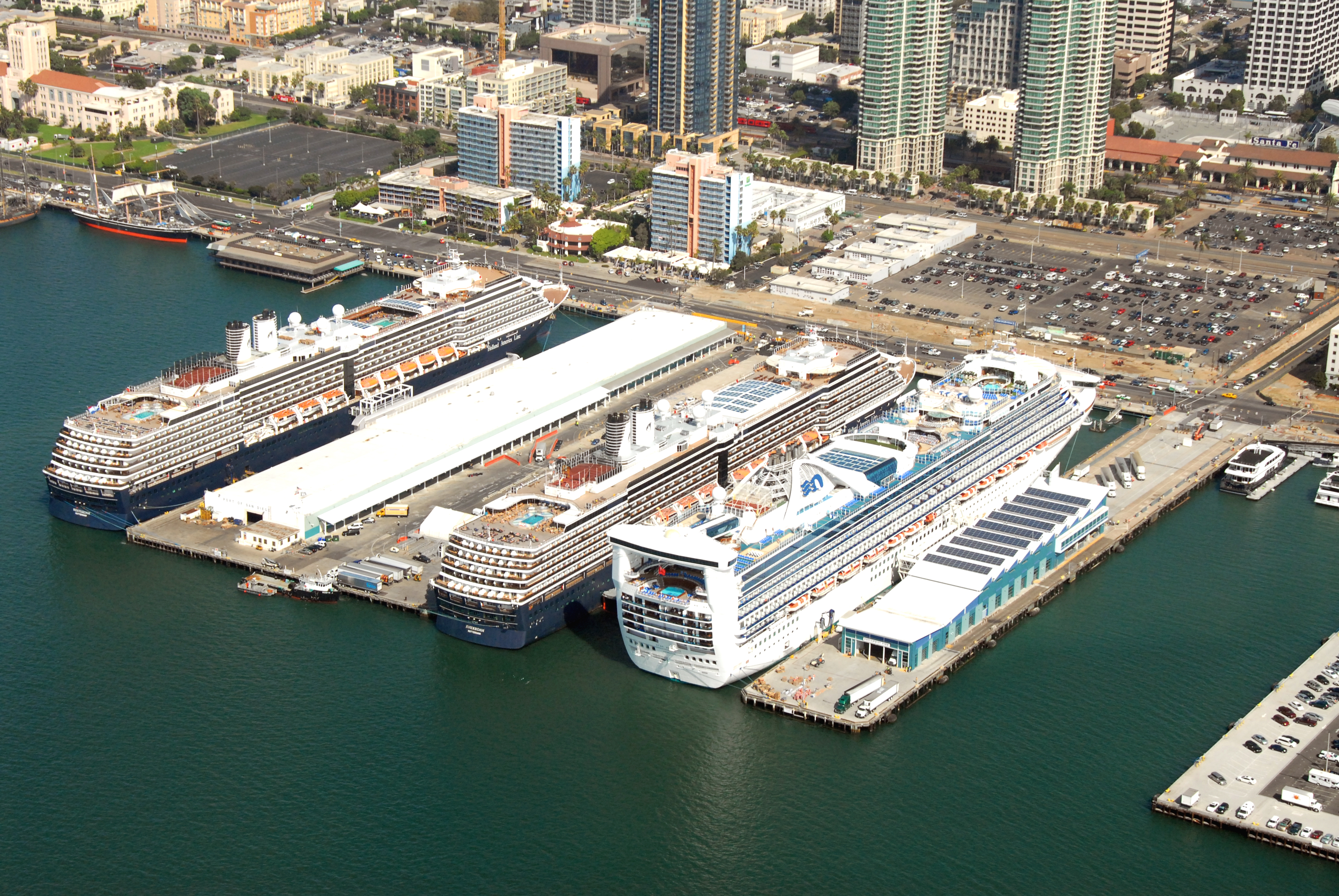
Broadway Pier (right of third cruise ship) as seen from the air in October 2012. The pier includes a cruise ship terminal added in 2010.

== History ==
Built in 1913, the pier has a long history of servicing passenger vessels. The 800-foot (240 m) pier was the first of San Diego's reinforced concrete piers found on the bay. It has been operated by the Port of San Diego since 1962.

In the 1970s, Broadway Pier was remodeled by San Diego architecture firm Innis-Tennebaum Architects' Donald Innis. It was designed and configured so that a person looking down Broadway could still see the bay (this is no longer the case with the new remodeled structure that was built in its place). Its innovative 1970s remodeling also originally featured planter boxes with trees and foliage, which was one of the first of its type of above-water structures to do this.

The pier was featured as a location in the 1979 film Hardcore directed by Paul Schrader and starring George C. Scott (standing in as Los Angeles) and was also the location for the 2003 premiere party for Master and Commander: The Far Side of the World, a film directed by Peter Weir.

In 2010, the 1970s version of the Broadway Pier building was demolished and a modern cruise ship terminal was erected in its place.

Passenger ferries to Coronado began running from the foot of Broadway on July 1, 1987, when the Star & Crescent Boat Company restored the cross-bay service that had ended with the opening of the San Diego–Coronado Bridge in 1969. From 1999 to 2010 the ferry also called at Naval Air Station North Island. The company, renamed Flagship Cruises & Events in 2011, operates the service as the Flagship Ferry.

== Facilities ==
=== Port Pavilion ===
The Port Pavilion on Broadway Pier is a 52,000-square-foot (4,800 m^{2}) building that serves as an auxiliary cruise ship terminal and as a venue for public events. The building is 464 feet (141 m) long, 75 feet (23 m) wide and 55 feet (17 m) tall. The Port of San Diego broke ground on the terminal in August 2009. It was designed by Bermello Ajamil & Partners and was dedicated on December 18, 2010. It cost $28 million. The building has LEED Gold certification; its features include a 60-kilowatt solar panel system, water-efficient fixtures and 7,550 square feet (701 m^{2}) of windows that reduce the need for indoor lighting.

The pavilion is used as a cruise terminal when the B Street Cruise Terminal is handling two ships and a third ship needs a berth. At other times it can be rented for meetings, concerts, conferences and other events. The pier has one cruise berth, 1,000 feet (300 m) long and 31.5 feet (9.6 m) deep, with one shore power connection, a mobile passenger boarding bridge and facilities for U.S. Customs and Border Protection inspections.

=== Public areas ===
The forecourt between the pavilion and Harbor Drive measures 400 by 130 feet (122 by 40 m), and the view court on the bay side of the pavilion measures 136 by 130 feet (41 by 40 m); both are public spaces. Broadway Plaza, a small park with a view deck, adjoins the pier on the shore side.

== Transportation ==
Public transportation at Broadway Pier
Mode	Service	Destinations
⛴ Ferry	Flagship Ferry	Coronado Ferry Landing
Bus	MTS Rapid Express 280	Escondido
Bus	MTS Rapid Express 290	Rancho Bernardo
Bus	MTS 923	Ocean Beach
Bus	MTS 992	San Diego International Airport
