= Garden State Fireworks =

American pyrotechnics company

Garden State Fireworks is a pyrotechnics company based in the Millington section of Long Hill Township, Morris County, New Jersey, United States. It was founded in 1890 and has been owned by the same family for four generations. It is one of the largest fireworks manufacturers in the United States.

== History ==
The company was founded in 1890 by Augustine Santore, a recent immigrant from Italy, where he had learned the trade of manufacturing fireworks. His sons and grandsons ("the Santore Brothers") continue to own and operate the company.

The company has produced some notable fireworks shows, including those for the 1988 Winter Olympics in Calgary and the New Year's Eve celebration in New York's Times Square. The Santores co-produced (with three other families) the fireworks display for the "Liberty Weekend" centennial celebration of the Statue of Liberty on July 4, 1986, which is the largest fireworks show in United States history, and at the time was the largest fireworks show ever produced.

In 1997 the company hosted and produced an International Fireworks Competition at Liberty State Park in Jersey City, New Jersey. There were displays from a different country each day for five days, followed by a non-competitive display by Garden State. Competitors came from China, Spain, Germany, Switzerland, and Italy.

== Awards ==
In 1982 the firm won the World Fireworks Championship, held in Monaco, and in a 1983 repeat competition they won the International Grand World Fireworks "Interlauriat" Championship, the fireworks world's highest honor. They won the San Sebastian International Fireworks Competition in Spain in 1991 and again in 1994.

== Accidents ==
- 1999: Fireworks showered an audience in Roselle Park, New Jersey causing minor injuries to 18 people. After that, the company doubled the size of the safety zone around its staging areas.
- 2002: High school football fans scrambled to avoid falling debris in Fort Myers, Florida; three students suffered minor injuries.
- 2007: A fireworks display in Cape Coral, Florida was cut short when a technician pushed control buttons too early; the company offered a discount for the next year's show.
- 2012: On July 4, 2012, a computer glitch caused San Diego's Big Bay Boom fireworks on Independence Day to simultaneously launch all 7,000 shells at once, rather than in the scripted sequence that was intended. The company apologized for the incident (which was dubbed the "Big Bay Bust") and offered to put on a future show for free.
