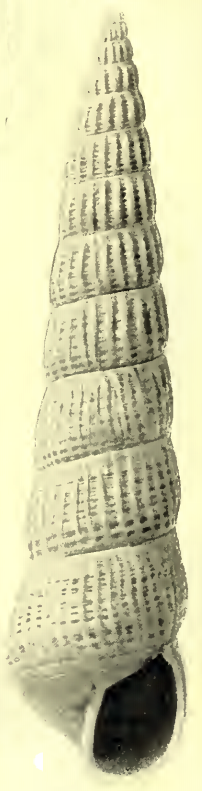
- Drawing of a shell of Turbonilla dora

Scientific classification
- Kingdom: Animalia
- Phylum: Mollusca
- Class: Gastropoda
- Family: Pyramidellidae
- Genus: Turbonilla
- Species: T. dora

Binomial name
- Turbonilla dora Bartsch, 1917

Synonyms
- Turbonilla (Pyrgiscus) dora Bartsch, 1917

= Turbonilla dora =

Species of gastropod

Turbonilla dora is a species of sea snail, a marine gastropod mollusk in the family Pyramidellidae, the pyrams and their allies.

== Description ==
The uniformly pale brown shell is very large (compared with the other species in this genus) and has an elongate conic shape. Its length measures 13.8 mm. The whorls of the protoconch are decollated. The 13 whorls of the teleoconch are well rounded, and strongly appressed at the summit. They are marked on the early whorls by rather strong, almost vertical, axial ribs, which become evanescent on the later turns. Of these ribs 18 occur upon the first to fourth, 20 upon the fifth, 22 upon the sixth, 24 upon the seventh, 26 upon the eighth, 32 upon the ninth, and 34 upon the tenth, while upon the penultimate whorl they become too enfeebled to be counted. The spiral sculpture consists of broad pits and feebly incised lines, the posterior fifth between the sutures being marked by six very fine, subequally spaced, spiral striations. These are followed by two stronger lines, which are succeeded by two strongly impressed pits. These are followed by a pit about half as wide as the last two, then by one a little stronger and finer, then by the widest pit of all, which is succeeded by one not quite as broad. These incised spiral lines pass up on and even cross the summit of the enfeebled ribs. The suture is moderately constricted. The periphery of the body whorl is decidedly inflated. The base of the shell is moderately long, somewhat inflated, and well rounded. it is marked by about 25, somewhat wavy, more or less regular, spiral grooves of somewhat varying width, which enclose spaces between them of a width about equal to the grooves. The space between the first of these and the last on the spire is a rather wide band, devoid of sculpture, excepting the fine spiral striations, which cover the entire surface of the shell, in addition to the coarser sculpture already described. The subquadrate aperture is small. The posterior angle is obtuse. The outer lip is moderately strong. The inner lip is oblique, straight and slightly reflected. The parietal wall is covered by a thick callus.

== Distribution ==
The type specimen was found in the Pacific Ocean off San Diego Bay, California.
