= GFF =

GFF may refer to:

== Entertainment ==
- El Gouna Film Festival, in Egypt
- Girlfriends Films, an American pornographic studio
- Glasgow Film Festival, in Scotland
- Gothenburg Film Festival, in Sweden

== Sports ==
- Gabonese Football Federation
- Gambia Football Federation
- Georgian Football Federation
- Göteborgs FF, Swedish football club
- Gothenburg Football Association
- Guinean Football Federation
- Guyana Football Federation

== Other uses ==
- General feature format, a file format used for describing genes
- GFF (journal), a geology journal
- Göteborgs FyrverkeriFabrik, a Swedish fireworks company
- Griffith Airport, in New South Wales, Australia
- Griffith railway station, in New South Wales, Australia
- Guild of Fine Food, a British family-owned company
- Malte Spitz (Gesellschaft für Freiheitsrechte; Society for Civil Rights), a Berlin-based non-profit organization
