= Harbor Island, San Diego =

Man-made peninsula in San Diego Bay, California

Coordinates: 32.725329°N 117.206424°W

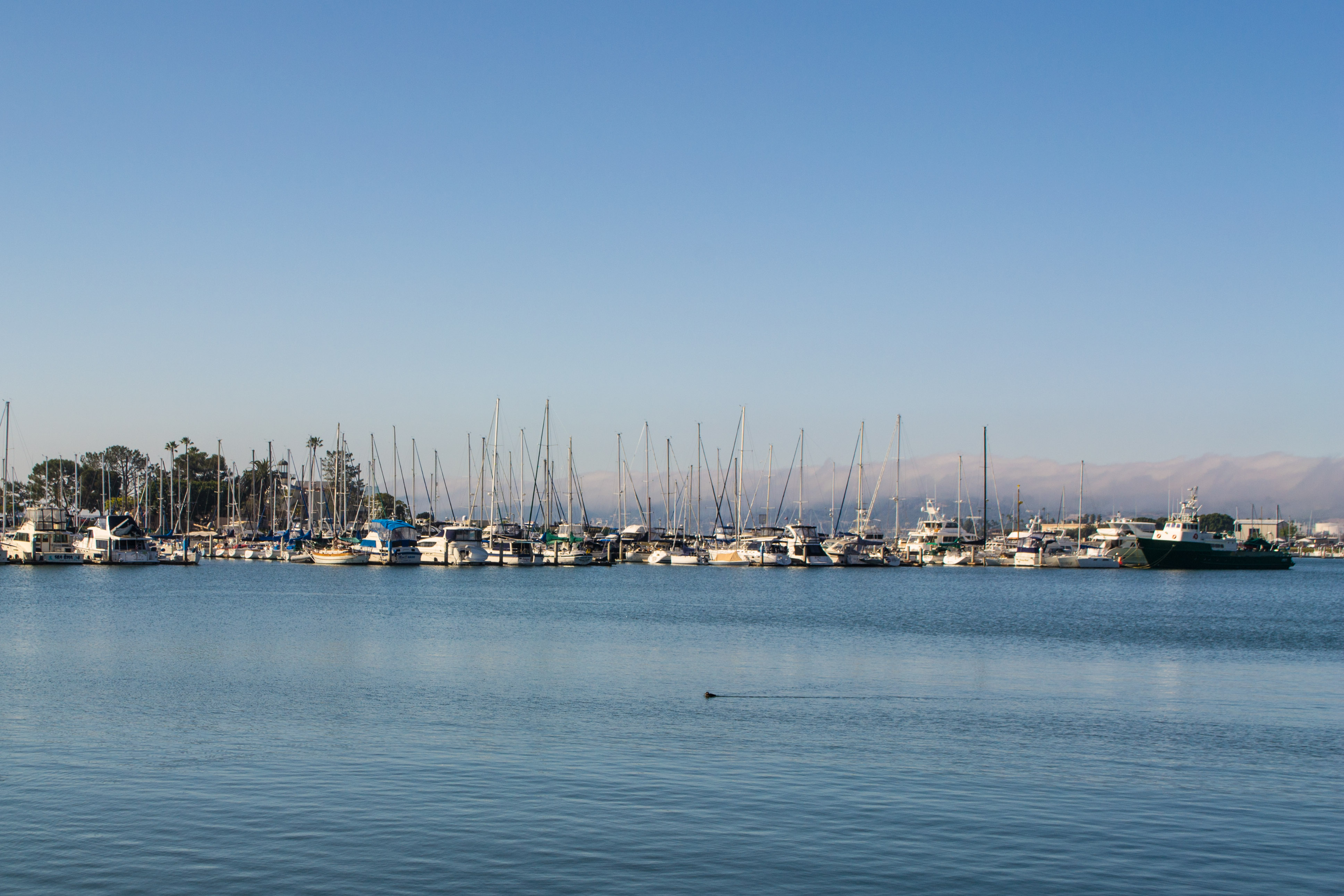
A marina on Harbor Island, San Diego

Harbor Island is a man-made peninsula created in 1961 from harbor dredgings, located in San Diego Bay in San Diego, California. It lies between Shelter Island and downtown San Diego, and is directly across Harbor Drive from San Diego International Airport. It is 2 miles (3.2 km) long and only a few hundred feet wide. A single road, Harbor Island Drive, runs from one end of Harbor Island to the other and connects it to the mainland.

The "island" includes several marinas which harbor thousands of small boats, as well as several restaurants, two high-rise hotels, and Harbor Island Drive Park. It is under the control of the Port of San Diego, which owns all the land and provides municipal services such as police, road maintenance, etc. Harbor Island businesses lease their location from the Port. Under California law, property on Harbor Island cannot be sold and permanent residences cannot be built there, because the area falls under the law governing public tidelands.
