= World Fireworks Championship =

The World Fireworks Championship was held in 2010 at Al Qurum Natural Park in Muscat, Oman as part of the Sultanate’s 40th National Day Celebrations. It occurred over three successive weekends, with a reported 750,000 people attending. It featured six firework companies, and the winner was the French company, Lacroix Ruggieri.

Each pyromusical display was broadcast live on the radio or television.

== The World Fireworks Championship Results ==
Year	Winner's Trophy	Joint Second Place	
2010	France (Lacroix-Ruggeiri)	Italy (Panzera)	China (Vulcan)

== Gallery ==
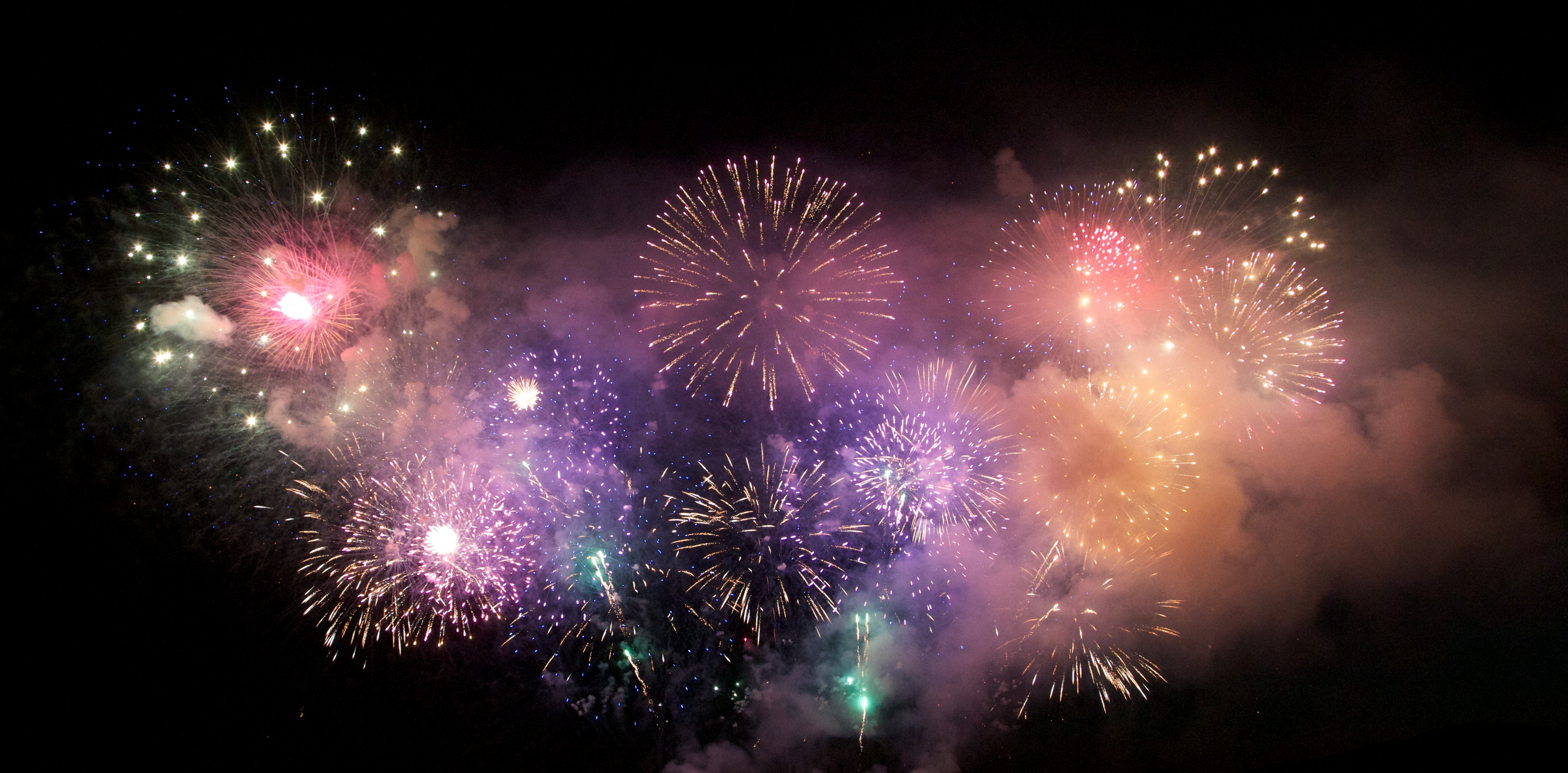
Display from The World Fireworks Championship

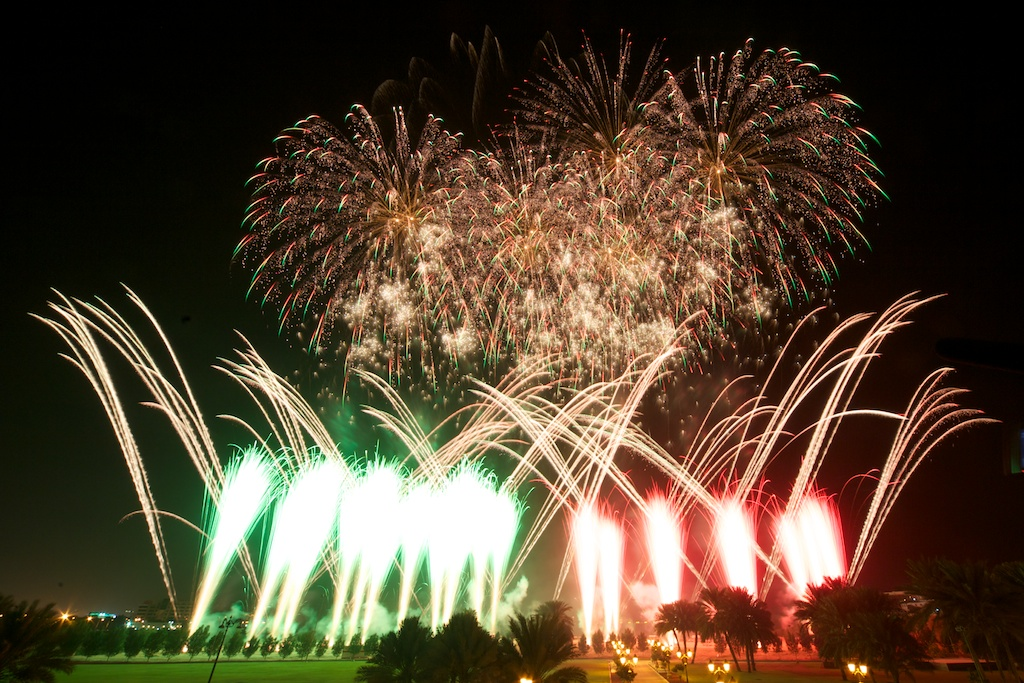
Vulcan's (China) Opening Performance

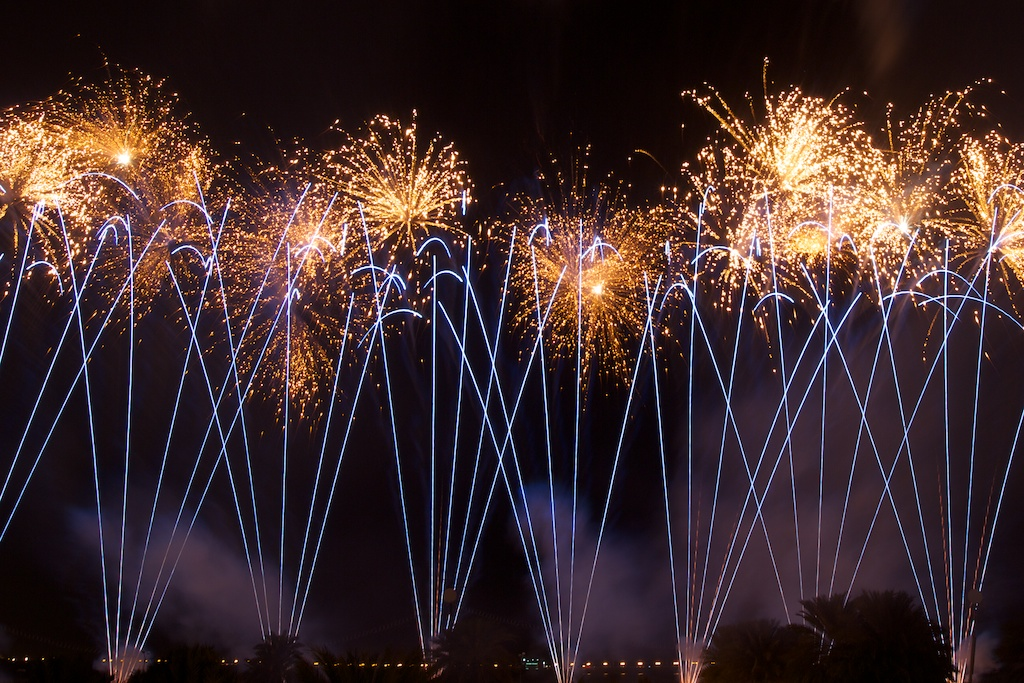
Panzera display (Italy)

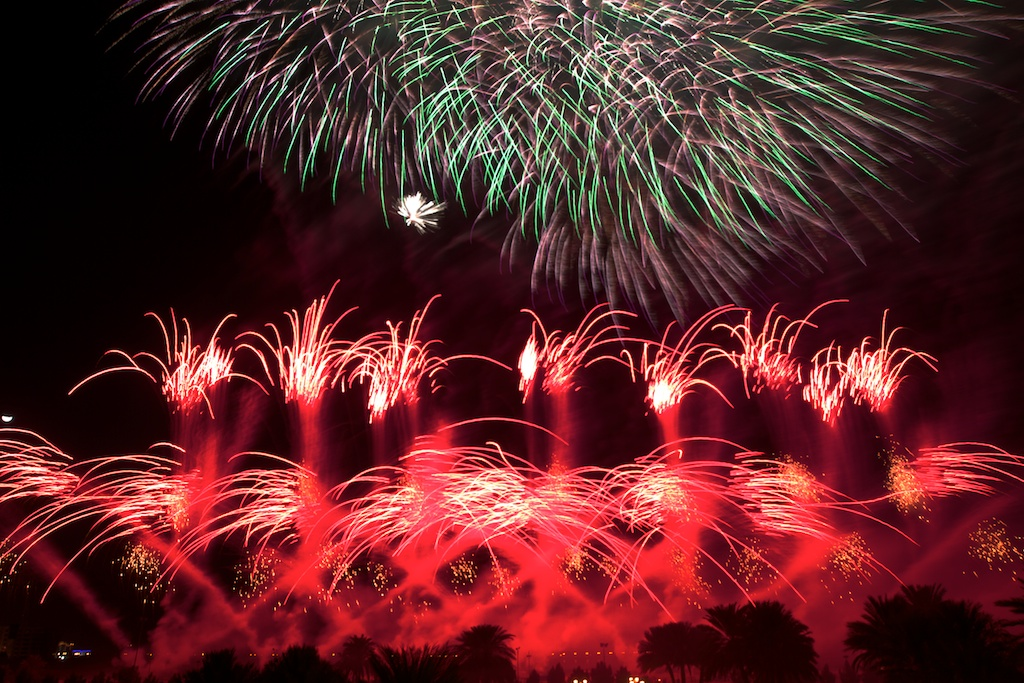
Zambelli display (United States)

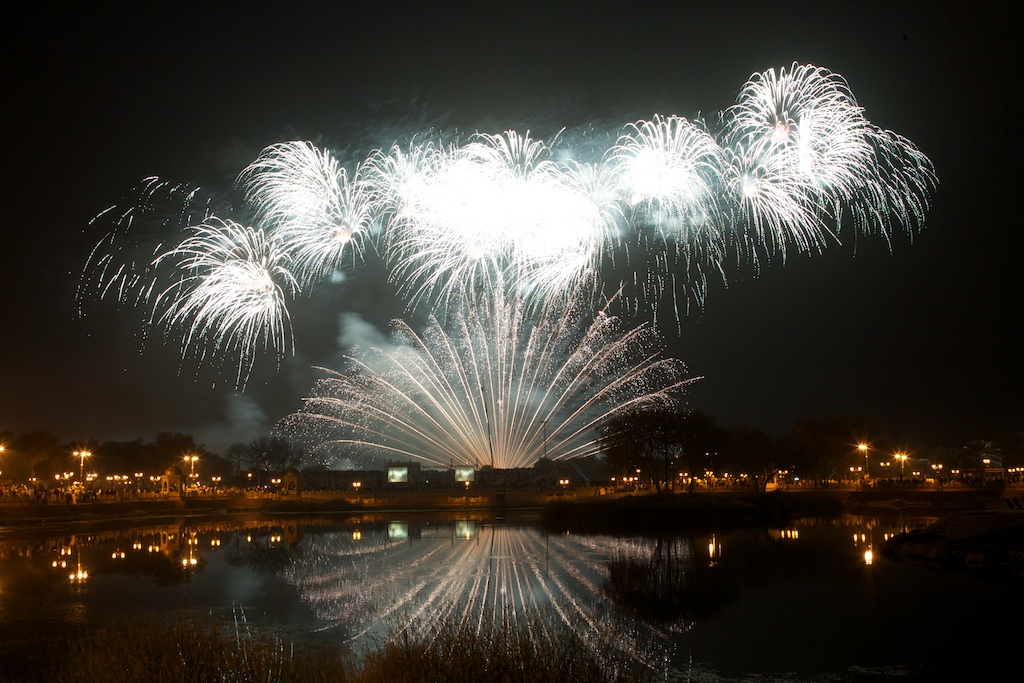
Lacroix-Ruggieri (France) display

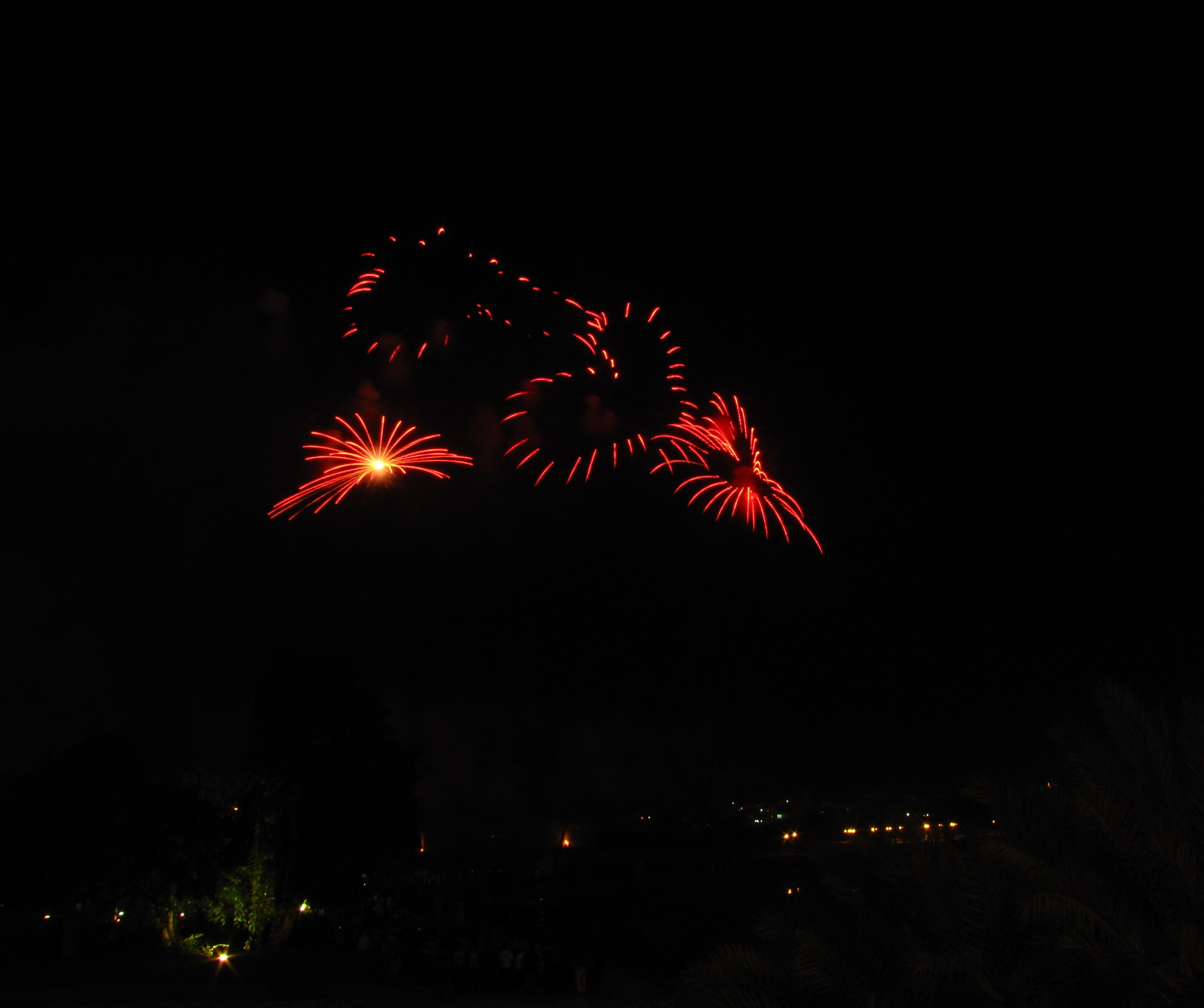
Lacroix-Ruggieri (France) 'Fire My Heart' display

== See also ==
- Fireworks competitions
- Fireworks
