= Göteborgs FyrverkeriFabrik =

Swedish fireworks company

Göteborgs FyrverkeriFabrik, (Gothenburg's Fireworks Factory) is a fireworks company based in Gothenburg, Sweden. The firm started in 1994 through the merging of two companies "Dsab pyroteknik" and "Pyromedia". The company has been awarded "Swedish Champion of Fireworks" 13 times, and has in 23 gold medals in fireworks competitions around the globe. Awards include silver in Rome (2002), silver in San Sebastian (2003), Knokke three gold in Knokke-Heist (2001, 2007 and 2009), gold in Hannover (2002, 2003, 2004, 2010) and silver (2005), gold in Berlin (2007), silver in Tarragona (2008), silver in Montreal (2010), and gold in Bilbao ( 2011).

The company, since the start, has been run by pyrotechnicians Anders Hållinder and Martin Hildeberg, and has six employees. GFF takes on commissions in Sweden and internationally.
