= San Diego Convention Center =

Primary convention center in San Diego, California

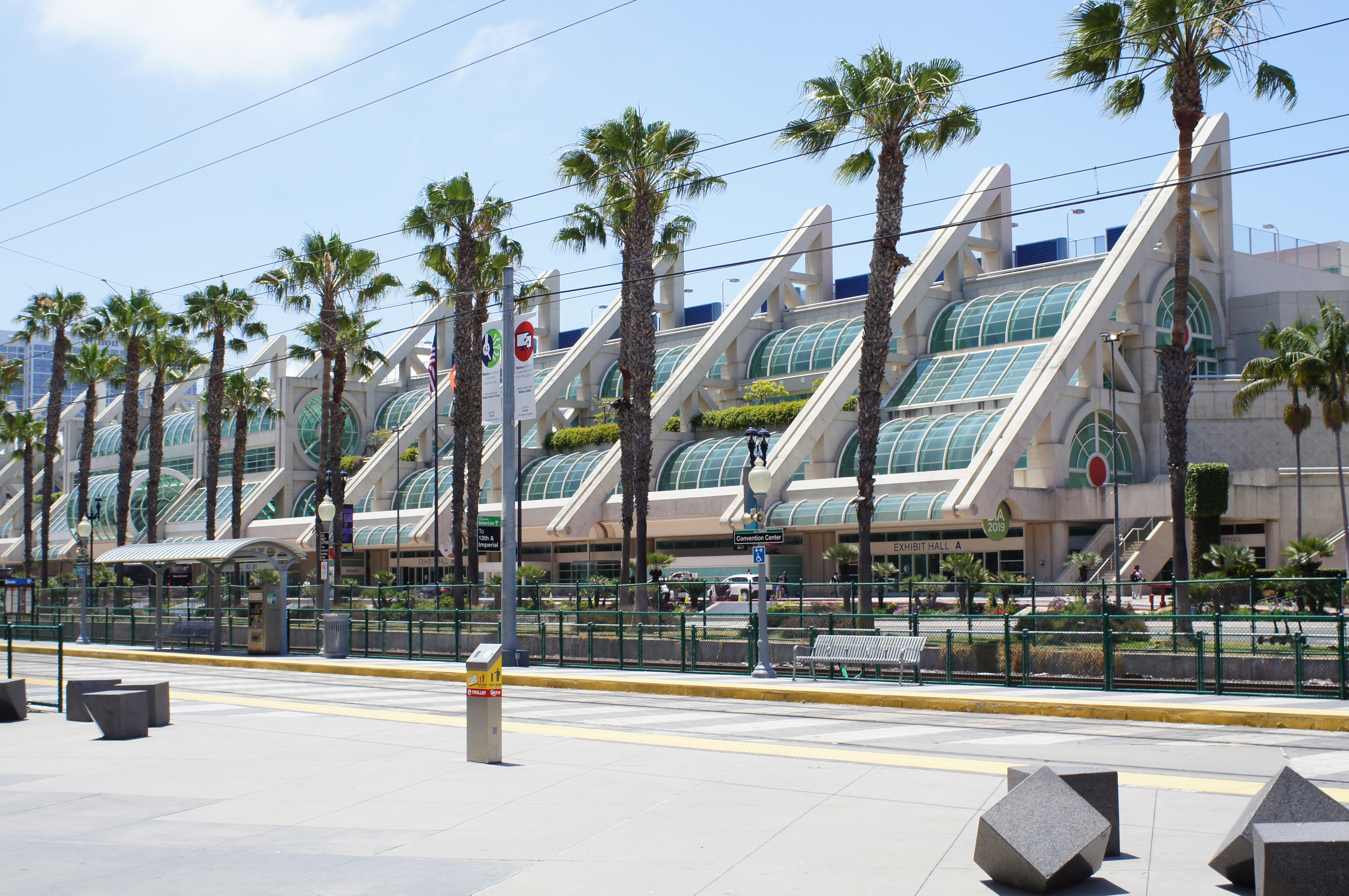
- Interactive map of San Diego Convention Center
- Address: 111 West Harbor Drive
- Location: San Diego, California, U.S.
- Coordinates: 32°42′23″N 117°09′41″W
- Public transit: Convention Center; Gaslamp Quarter; Convention Center Ferry Landing

Construction
- Built: March 1987 – November 1989
- Opened: November 1989
- Expanded: September 2001
- Cost: $164 million ($426 million in 2025 dollars)

Website
- www.visitsandiego.com

The San Diego Convention Center is the primary convention center of San Diego, California, United States. It is located in the Marina district in downtown San Diego, near the Gaslamp Quarter. The center is managed by the San Diego Convention Center Corporation, a public-benefit nonprofit corporation created by the City of San Diego.

== History ==
San Diego approved a measure to fund construction of a new convention center in 1983 on land owned by the Port of San Diego. Construction of the original building began in March 1987 and was completed in November 1989. An expansion which doubled the gross square footage of the facility was completed in September 2001. In September 2008, the center took steps to acquire adjacent property for an additional expansion.

Notable events hosted at the convention center include San Diego Comic-Con, TwitchCon, and the Society for Neuroscience. Television game show Wheel of Fortune filmed live tapings of shows at the convention center, featuring contestants from the San Diego area; the episodes aired nationally in May 1997, 2003, and 2007. It hosted the 1996 Republican National Convention, which nominated Bob Dole and Jack Kemp for president and vice president of the United States, respectively. It was also the venue for the 2007 California Democratic Party Convention.

In 2008, Hilton San Diego Bayfront opened south of the convention center; this was followed by Harbor Drive Pedestrian Bridge which opened in the spring of 2011, which links the convention center with the neighborhoods on the other side of Harbor Drive. In 2014, the convention center hosted the Biotechnology Industry Organization (BIO) International Convention, bringing in $56 million to the economy of San Diego. In 2016, the second annual convention for the video game streaming platform Twitch, TwitchCon, was hosted at the convention center. In 2019, TwitchCon was hosted again at the convention center, later revealing at the event that it would yet again be hosted at the convention center in September 2020. The event was cancelled due to the COVID-19 pandemic, but was later hosted in October 2022. TwitchCon is set to be set at the San Diego Convention Center from 2024 to 2028, making it the second-largest recurring convention held in the venue.

=== Notable events ===
- San Diego Comic-Con, held annually since 1979
- Society for Neuroscience, held in 2007, 2010, 2013, 2016, 2018, 2022, and 2025
- 1996 Republican National Convention
- Biotechnology Industry Organization, held in 2014
- Esri International User Conference, held annually since 1997
- Wheel of Fortune, held in 1997, 2003, and 2007
- TwitchCon, held in 2016, 2019, 2022, and 2024 through 2028
- DreamHack, held in 2023

== Design ==
The convention center offers 615,700 ft^{2} (57,200 m^{2}) of exhibit space. As of 2009, it was the 24th largest convention facility in North America. Phase 1, completed in 1989, was designed by Canadian architect Arthur Erickson. Phase 2, completed in 2001, was designed by a joint venture between the national architecture and engineering firm HNTB, and the San Diego architecture firm Tucker Sadler. Capacity for the facility is 125,000.

The center's most distinguishing feature is the Sails Pavilion, a 90,000 sq ft (8,400 m^{2}) exhibit and special event area. The Sails Pavilion's roof consists of distinctive Teflon-coated fiberglass "sails" intended to reflect San Diego's maritime history, as well as to advertise the center's proximity to the San Diego shore. The Pavilion was originally built as an open-air facility under the roof. However, the center found it hard to convince potential users to book an open-air facility, so in 2000 the Pavilion area was enclosed in glass, greatly expanding the usable area of the center. Beginning in December 2016, the Sails Pavilion began a renovation period. Renovations to the Sails Pavilion were completed in late February 2018, with a capability addition of a programmable LED lighting system.

Another unusual feature of the convention center is its inclined elevator, which ascends alongside the large exterior staircase.

== Proposed expansion ==
Beginning in 2008, the convention center began to pay the lease owners of the neighboring Fifth Avenue Landing property in a deal which would have bought out the lease. By November 2012, there was a $520 million proposal to expand the convention center. The proposed expansion would have increased the available space within the convention center by 33 percent and had a target completion date of early 2016. In March 2013, judicial approval was received for the funding method for the expansion; the funding would come from a special taxing district consisting of hotels in San Diego. The expansion was approved by the California Coastal Commission in October 2013.

However, on August 1, 2014, a California appeals court ruled the hotel tax unconstitutional, jeopardizing the financing scheme for the convention center expansion, forcing the city to either appeal the decision, seek ballot approval for the tax in accordance with the court's ruling, or come up with an entirely new financing scheme. Attorney Cory Briggs was the filing attorney for the successful lawsuit; in 2015, Briggs had another lawsuit filed regarding the bay front nature of the proposed expansion. The decision was not appealed by the San Diego City Council. The effort to expand the convention center up to August 2014 expended $10 million. Due to the lawsuit, other cities have contacted Comic-Con International regarding the possibility of relocating away from San Diego. In May 2015, the Convention Center stopped paying the lease owners of the Fifth Avenue Landing, having spent $4 million up to that point, losing their rights to the property. In June 2015, the Coastal Commission again approved the convention center expansion plan. In January 2017, Briggs's lawsuit regarding the bayfront nature of the proposed expansion was thrown out.

By 2017, plans to expand the convention center began again. However, the proposed expansion is opposed by a hotel proposal on the Fifth Avenue Landing property which was released when the previous expansion proposal ended. In 2018, a ballot initiative was launched seeking to raise funds and to gain approval for the convention center re-proposed expansion, as well as to fund services for homeless individuals; the ballot initiative will be voted on in 2020.

In November 2018, the City of San Diego paid the lease owners of the Fifth Avenue Landing, to settle a lawsuit out of court regarding development rights. While the lawsuit was occurring, the Port of San Diego and the City of San Diego were in negotiations with the Fifth Avenue Landing to enter into a new lease to allow for convention center expansion on the neighboring property, which would involve an initial $5 million payment, and a total $32 million buyout if the ballot initiative passes. In January 2019, San Diego Mayor Kevin Faulconer stated that a deal for the Fifth Avenue Landing was still in negotiation, and the lease owners had the right to build a hotel on their leased land, which has been envisioned as where the convention center would expand.

== See also ==
- List of convention centers in the United States
