= Fireworks competitions =

This is a list of worldwide fireworks competitions.

== Internationaler Feuerwerkswettbewerb Herrenhausen (International Fireworks Competition Hanover-Herrenhausen) ==
The competition takes place every year in the Baroque Royal Gardens of Hanover-Herrenhausen, Germany. Consequently, each team has to show in its twenty-five minutes program a baroque part due to the gardens.

== Montreal Fireworks festival ==
Known officially as L’International des Feux Loto-Québec, the Montreal Fireworks Festival is the most prestigious and largest fireworks competition in the world. It is an annual international competition held in Montreal, Quebec, Canada since 1985. The event begins in June and carries on until August. Each summer, several pyrotechnical companies from different countries present a 30-minute-long pyromusical show. Gold, Silver and Bronze Jupiter trophies are awarded to the winners. The Jupiters have become symbols of prestige within the fireworks industry. The fireworks are synchronized to music which is also broadcast over a local radio station. Over 3 million spectators gather each year to see the fireworks. The main viewing locations are: the Jacques-Cartier Bridge (closed to traffic the evening of each event), La Ronde (amusement park), and on either side of the St. Lawrence River. Approximately 6,000 fireworks are set off during each show.

== Da Nang International Fireworks Festival ==
DIFF is a competition started in 2008 where teams from all over the world compete against each other, in the city of Da Nang, Vietnam. It was held at the end of March (2008–2010) and the end of April (2011–2015)

Since 2017, the event has been called the Da Nang International Fireworks Festival. Taking an extraordinary turn this year, the competition will no longer be just two nights, but separated into five separate nights with eleven displays from teams around the world to paint the skies of the night. This long festival is carried out from End May until July with many side events.

The winner 2025 currently is Team China (Jiangxi YangFeng Display)

Past winners:

- 2024 - Joho Pyro - Finland
- 2023 - Arteventia - France
- 2019 - Joho Pyro - Finland
- 2018 - Martarello Group - Italy
- 2017 - Martarello Group - Italy
- 2015 - Howard & Sons Fireworks - Australia
- 2013 - Melrose Pyrotechincs - (United States) USA
- 2012 - Parente Fireworks - Italy
- 2011 - Parente Fireworks - Italy
- 2010 - Jacque Couturier Organisation - France
- 2009 - Liuyang Dancing Fireworks - China
- 2008 - David Whysall - Canada

== World Pyro Olympics ==
The World Pyro Olympics are an annual competition amongst the top fireworks companies in the world. It is held in Manila, Philippines. The event is one of the largest and most intense international fireworks competitions. It is run through a period of five consecutive days allowing patrons to experience more of the show. Two countries perform each day. The host of the event does not participate in the competition but performs a fireworks display on the last night. Awards, such as the People's Choice, are given out after the exhibition. The crowning of the World Pyro Olympics Champion ends the event.

== Celebration of Light ==
The Honda Celebration of Light of Vancouver was an annual musical fireworks competition held every summer over English Bay in Vancouver, British Columbia, Canada from 1990 to 2025. Three companies representing their country performed a twenty-five minute firework display set to music. Typically the last Saturday of July, the following Wednesday and the first Saturday of August. The fireworks were synchronized to music which was also broadcast over a local radio station. Musical concerts, displays and activations enticed festival goers to the site early in the day.

== Macau International Fireworks Display ==
Held over five weeks during September with two displays on the same night weekly, with the final night held on China National Day on 1 October. The competition features 10 pyrotechnic companies from around the world.

== GlobalFest International Fireworks Festival ==
GlobalFest has been held in Calgary, Alberta, Canada every August since 2003 featuring cultural pavilions, a film festival and an international fireworks festival. In previous years, the international fireworks competition featured a different nation each night of the five night competition with live performances three different stages throughout Elliston Park showcasing the culture of that country prior to the fireworks display.

== Firework Champions ==
A series of four events at various venues around the UK each summer, organised by MLE Pyrotechnics of Daventry.

At each event, three UK firework companies (different competitors at each event) compete against each other with a 10-minute firework display choreographed to music. They are followed by a (non-competing) display by the host company. The audience can text vote for their favourite team. Displays are fired using the latest state of the art technology.

== Fireworks Championship ==
Four teams compete against each other in Sweden with a music firework display. Displays are fired at the bank of the river Motala ström In the center of Norrköping. Usually it takes place in the first weeks of August. The winner of the last eight competitions have been the Gothenburg located firm Göteborgs FyrverkeriFabrik.

== National Pyrotechnics Fair of Tultepec, Mexico ==
A Mexican Castillo with ceremonial dancers around it

Every year this town, known as "Mexico's Capital of Pyrotechnics", hosts a week-long pyrotechnics fair that features the "Castillos de Torre" or "Tower Fireworks Competition". Since 2005, a Pyromusical Competition has been held involving up to seven fireworks shows lasting 10 minutes each. These events are not yet open to international competition.

In addition to the competition fireworks, almost every day different types of fireworks (including day-time tower fireworks) are burned as part of the religious festivities. The fair also includes the "Burning of the Bulls", which is always held on 8 March in celebration of John of God, the patron saint of Tultepec's pyrotechnicians.

== Tarragona International Fireworks Display ==
This fireworks contest is held every first week of July in Catalonia, Spain.

== Les Masters de Feu International Fireworks Festival ==
Les Masters de Feu is an international fireworks Festival who take part in Compiègne in France, each year in September since 2016.

== The World Fireworks Championship ==
The World Fireworks Championship was a pyromusical competition in which six pyrotechnics companies took part over three successive weekends. The event took place in Oman in 2010 where an estimated 750,000 spectators attended. French company Lacroix Ruggieri won the competition.

== Ignis Brunensis ==
Ignis Brunensis international fireworks competition is held every year in May or June in Brno, Czech Republic.

== Pyrotechnics Guild International ==
The Pyrotechnics Guild International holds a convention each August featuring competitions not only in displays but in creation of individual fireworks. Individual classes of hand-built fireworks are competitively judged, ranging from simple rockets to extremely large and complex aerial shells.

== Philippine International Pyromusical Competition ==
Philippine International Pyromusical Competition is a contest that started in 2010 where different countries showcases their own display. It is held every Saturday between February and March every year at the Mall of Asia Philippines. The show lasts a minimum of 15 minutes each participant.

== International Costa Brava Fireworks contest "Trofeu Vila de Blanes" ==
Fireworks of Blanes is an annual competition with international participation. Their beginnings in 1960, with international participation in 1970 and became an international competition in 1980. Held every year during the Santa Anna festival on July in Catalonia, Spain.
