= Safdie Rabines Architects =

American architecture firm

Practice information
- Firm type: Architecture; interiors; urban design; master planning
- Partners: Taal Safdie; Ricardo Rabines; Eric Lindebak; Brett Milkovich
- Founders: Taal Safdie; Ricardo Rabines
- Founded: 1993
- No. of employees: 50
- Location: San Diego, California, US

Website
- safdierabines.com

Safdie Rabines Architects is an American architecture, interiors and urban design firm based in San Diego, California.

== History and leadership ==
Safdie Rabines Architects was established by Ricardo Rabines and Taal Safdie, the daughter of the world-renowned architect Moshe Safadie. They met while enrolled in University of Pennsylvania School of Design's Master of Architecture program. They married in 1989, moved to San Diego, CA in 1990, and established Safdie Rabines Architects in 1993.

== Awards ==
In 2006, Safdie and Rabines received the Residential Architect "Rising Stars" Leadership Award. In 2017, the National City Aquatic Center was awarded an Orchid for Architecture by the San Diego Architectural Foundation.
