= Shelter Island, San Diego =

Man-made peninsula in San Diego, California

Coordinates: 32°42′52″N 117°13′34″W

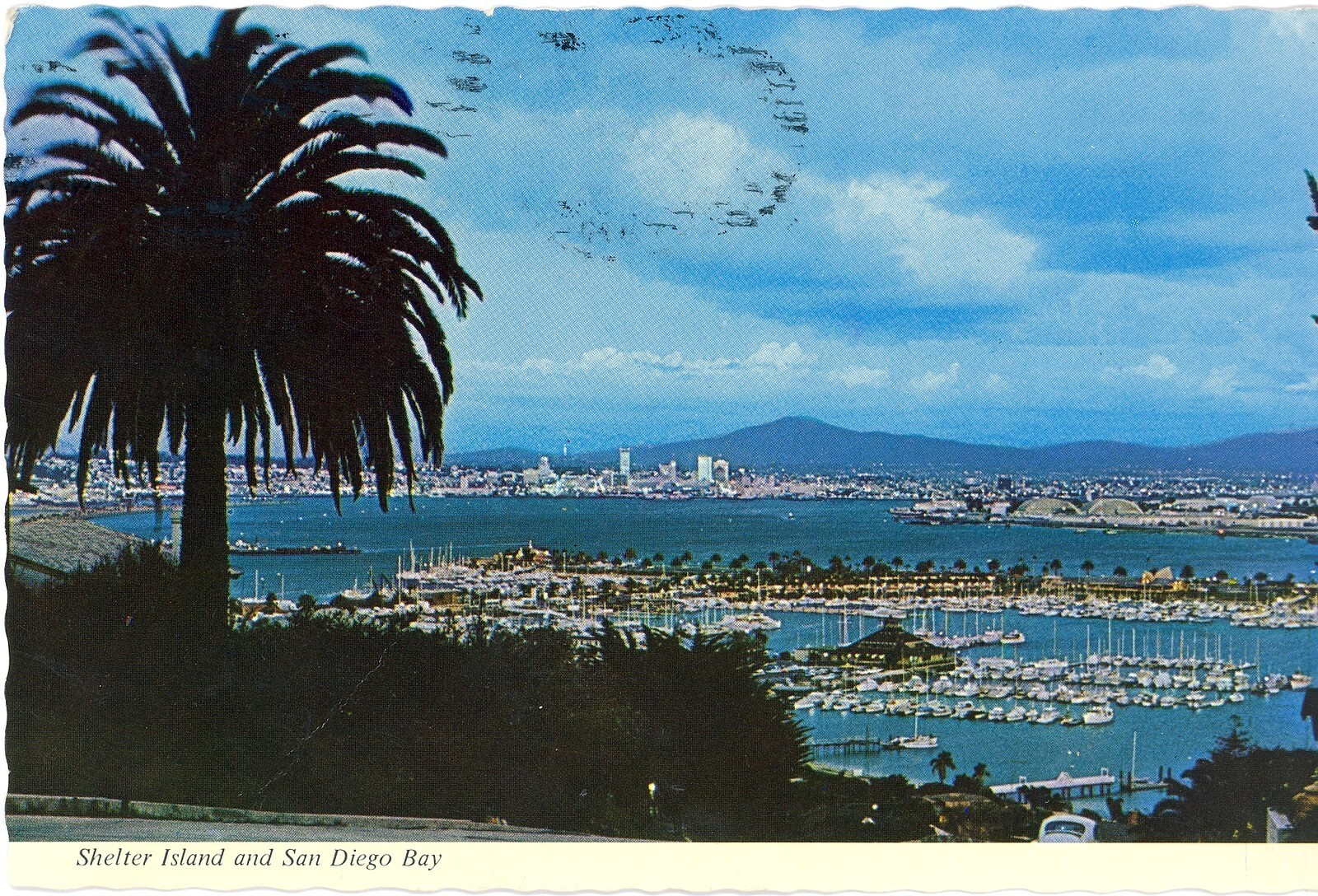
A 1960s era postcard shows Shelter Island (marked by a row of palm trees) jutting out into San Diego Bay

Shelter Island is a neighborhood of Point Loma in San Diego, California, United States. It is actually not an island but is connected to the mainland by a narrow strip of land. It was originally a sandbank in San Diego Bay, visible only at low tide. It was built up into dry land using material dredged from the bay in 1934. It was developed in the 1950s and contains hotels, restaurants, marinas, and public parkland.

Shelter Island is owned and controlled by the Port of San Diego, which also provides all police and other public services. Shelter Island businesses lease their location from the Port of San Diego. Under California law, property on Shelter Island cannot be sold and permanent residences cannot be built there, because the area falls under the law governing public tidelands.

The "island" is 1.2 miles (1.9 km) long and only a few hundred feet wide. A single street, Shelter Island Drive, runs the length of Shelter Island and also connects it to the mainland via a causeway lined with marine-related businesses.

== History and development ==
Shelter Island was first recorded on a United States coast and geodetic map as a "mudbank". It was gradually formed by deposit of soil and sand from the San Diego River. The sandbar was used to dump materials from dredging of San Diego Bay for US Navy requirements in World War II which required a deepening of the harbor channel, further building it up. In the late 1940s The San Diego Harbor Commission undertook a dredging program that provided a new entrance to the yacht basin, and the dredged material was used to connect Shelter Island with Point Loma, and to further raise the island 14 feet above low tide; then another project raised it 7 feet above high tide. In 1960, the media described Shelter Island as "something from nothing", "a testimonial to human ingenuity", and "a man made wonderland of sub-tropical splendor".

Per a special city overlay zone, all buildings on Shelter Island are supposed to follow a "Polynesian" theme, which was very popular in the 1950s when the area was first developed and attracted a concentration of multiple exotically themed restaurants and "tiki bars". Still operating since 1954, the famous Bali Hai restaurant has a tiki bar and its own yacht dock; in its early days it had Polynesian floor shows. The Half Moon Inn, with its attached Humphrey's restaurant and summer concert venue, also retains a Polynesian theme. The Kona Kai Club still exists but has been remodeled to a Spanish theme. Many of the original tiki-themed buildings such as L'Escale, Shelter Isle Inn, and Kona Inn have been demolished.

== Attractions ==
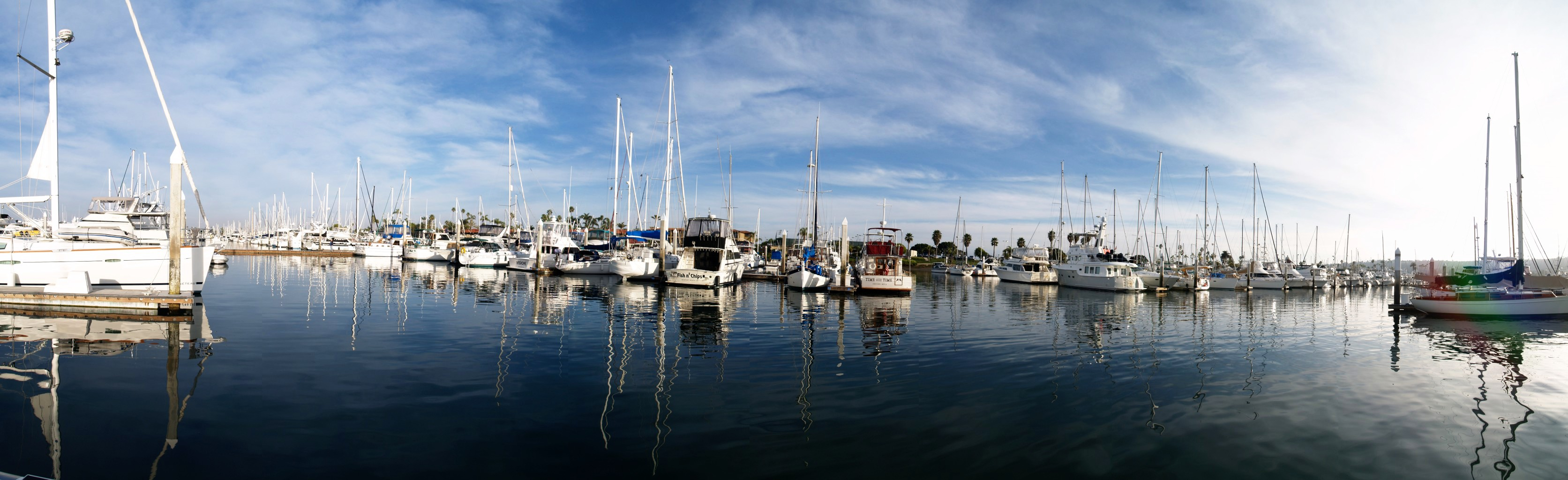
Shelter Island Marina

Shelter Island contains one yacht club, the Silvergate Yacht Club, and it creates a sheltered harbor for two others, San Diego Yacht Club and Southwestern Yacht Club.

Shelter Island is known as a destination for superyachts because it contains one of the few marinas in San Diego Bay with a deep enough harbor for these oversized vessels. The annual YachtFest, spotlighting superyachts, is held at Shelter Island Marina every September. The event also features mock gunbattles between two replicas of 19th century tall ships from the collection of the San Diego Maritime Museum.

From June through September, nationally known musicians and comedians perform at an outdoor concert venue on Shelter Island. The area is a popular place for viewing the annual Big Bay Boom fireworks display on the Fourth of July, as well as the Parade of Lights, a December tradition in which boats decorated with holiday lights parade on the Bay to be viewed from the shore.

=== Public art ===
Shelter Island contains several notable pieces of public art. The Tunaman's Memorial, a larger-than-life bronze sculpture by Franco Vianello, is dedicated to the tuna fishermen who were formerly an important part of the area's economy. The Yokohama Friendship Bell, a large bronze bell housed in a pagoda structure, was a gift from the city of Yokohama, Japan, in 1958 to commemorate the sister city relationship between San Diego and Yokohama. Pacific Rim Park at the southwestern end of Shelter Island was created by artist James Hubbell and is centered on a round bubbling fountain called Pearl of the Pacific. The fountain is surrounded by a mosaic wall and a dramatic arch and is a popular place for outdoor weddings.
