= Port of San Diego =

Port district on San Diego Bay, California

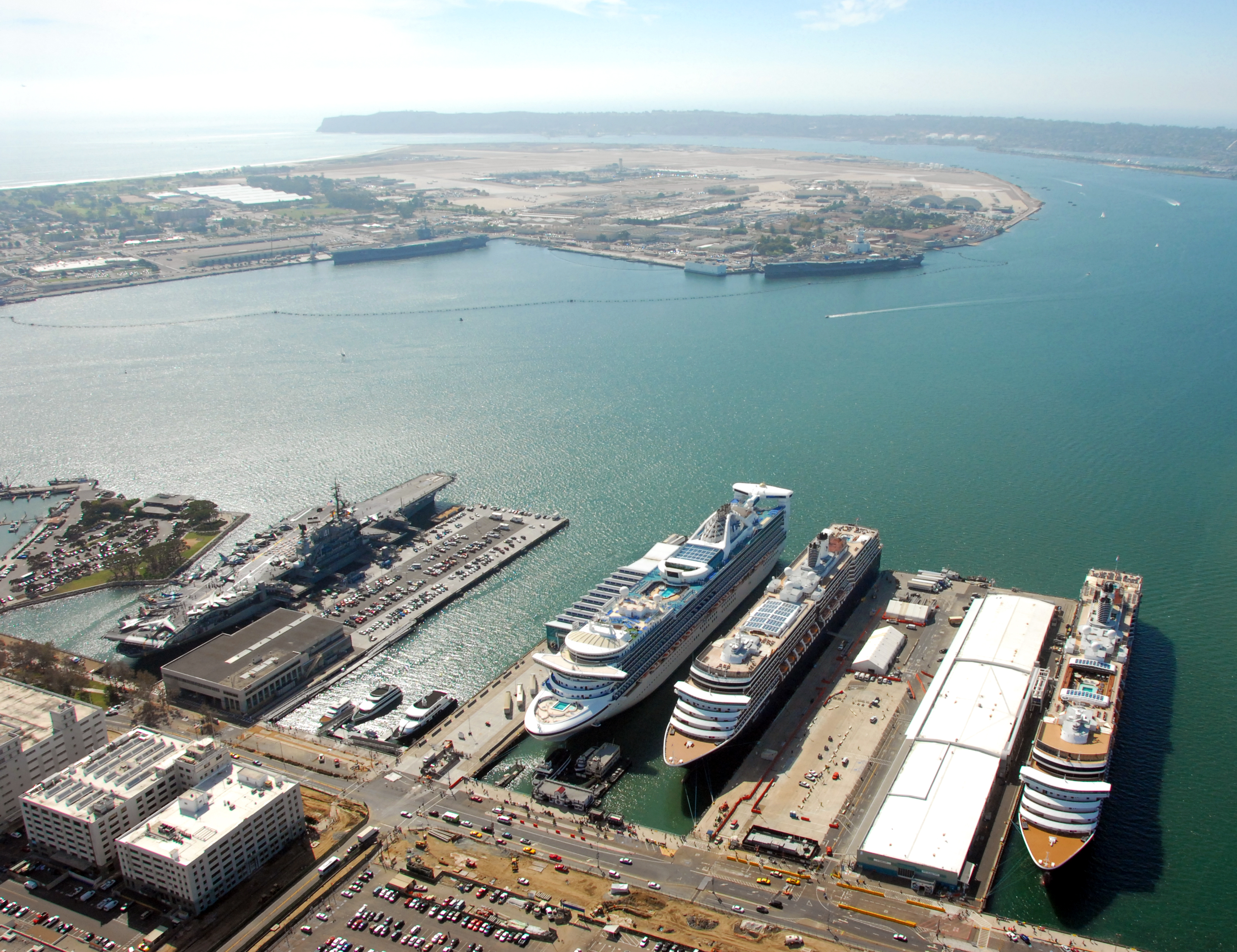
- Aerial view of the Port of San Diego, showing three cruise ships and the USS Midway Museum. NAS North Island is visible in the background.
- Interactive map of Port of San Diego

Location
- Country: United States
- Location: San Diego Bay, San Diego County, California
- Coordinates: 32°41′50″N 117°09′17″W
- UN/LOCODE: US SAN

Details
- Opened: December 18, 1962
- Owned by: San Diego Unified Port District
- Size of harbour: 11,516 acres (4,660 ha)
- Land area: 2,616 acres (1,059 ha)
- Employees: ▲574 (FY24)
- President & CEO: Scott Chadwick
- Commissioners: Dan Malcolm; Ann Moore; Danielle Moore; GilAnthony Ungab; Frank Urtasun; Sid Voorakkara; Michael Zucchet

Statistics
- Annual cargo tonnage: ▼1,942,436 t (FY24)
- Annual container volume: 153,519 TEU (FY24)
- Passenger traffic: ▼342,448 (FY24)
- Annual revenue: ▼US$201,753,000 (FY24)
- Net income: ▼US$95,268,474 (FY24)

The Port of San Diego, officially the San Diego Unified Port District, is a special district that manages San Diego Bay and its waterfront in San Diego, Chula Vista, Coronado, Imperial Beach and National City, California. The California State Legislature created the district in 1962 to take over tidelands that the state had granted to the bayfront cities, and it holds them in trust for the public. It has not levied taxes since 1970 and is governed by a seven-member Board of Port Commissioners appointed by the five city councils. Until 2003 the district also operated what is now San Diego International Airport, and it paid for construction of the San Diego Convention Center, which opened in 1989.

The port operates two marine cargo terminals: the Tenth Avenue Marine Terminal in San Diego and the National City Marine Terminal, a major point of entry for imported vehicles. Six shipyards operate on its tidelands. Its two cruise terminals make San Diego the third-busiest cruise port in California, and it maintains landings for ferry service on the bay and facilities for commercial and recreational fishing.

The port leases land to more than 600 businesses, including hotels, and maintains 23 public parks. It is redeveloping parts of the waterfront, including the Chula Vista Bayfront. Its environmental programs include the Maritime Clean Air Strategy, adopted in 2021, and shore power at all four of its marine terminals. The district has its own police force, the Harbor Police.

== History ==
=== Kumeyaay, Spanish and Mexican periods ===
The Kumeyaay have lived in the San Diego region for thousands of years. When Juan Rodríguez Cabrillo entered the bay in 1542, he met Kumeyaay people, who fished at sea from reed canoes. Cabrillo probably landed at Ballast Point on September 28, 1542, and named the bay San Miguel. Sebastián Vizcaíno anchored there on November 10, 1602, and renamed it San Diego.

The Portolá expedition reached the bay by sea and land in 1769. Its members occupied part of the Kumeyaay village of Cosoy (Kosa'aay), whose residents shared their water with the expedition, and Mission San Diego de Alcalá was founded on the hill above the village on July 16, 1769. Because the presidio on that hill stood too far from the harbor entrance to defend it, the Spanish began building Fort Guijarros at the base of Ballast Point in 1795.

During the Mexican period, ships in the California hide trade called at La Playa, on the bay shore of Point Loma, where hides were cured and stored for shipment. Richard Henry Dana Jr. described the work in Two Years Before the Mast, drawing on his time there in 1835 and 1836.

=== City harbor (1850–1962) ===
Construction of Horton's Wharf in Alonzo Horton's New San Diego began in 1868. In 1911 the state granted the tidelands of San Diego Bay to the City of San Diego in trust for navigation, commerce and fisheries. The city built Broadway Pier in 1913 with a $1.7 million bond issue, and in 1919 it established a Harbor Commission and Harbor Department to manage the tidelands. Work on a second pier, at the foot of B Street, began in 1922; it was completed in 1925.

The city dedicated Lindbergh Field, its municipal airport, on August 16, 1928. The site was city tidelands at the north end of the bay, filled with material dredged from the harbor. Dredging created new land elsewhere on the bay as well: the filling of Shelter Island was completed in 1950, and Harbor Island was built in 1961 with fill from a Navy dredging project at North Island. Until 1962 the San Diego Harbor Department controlled the city's tidelands, while Chula Vista, Coronado, Imperial Beach and National City each managed their own.

=== Port district (1962–present) ===
The San Diego Unified Port District was created in 1962 after the California State legislature passed Senate Bill 41 and the San Diego County Board of Supervisors certified it.

The tidelands that the state had granted to San Diego, Chula Vista, Coronado and National City were transferred to the district. The City of San Diego contributed 68 percent of the non-submerged tidelands.

In 1964, voters approved a $10.9 million bond for capital improvements. Improvements included the development of a new air terminal, preparation for Harbor Island to be leased, and construction of a new cargo terminal in National City.

In 1970, the first cruise ship to offer scheduled cruises out of San Diego since the creation of the port began making 10-day trips to Mexico.

In 1980, the port completed a wildlife refuge in Chula Vista in an effort to improve the ecological balance of the Bay.

In 1983, the San Diego Cruise Industry Consortium was formed to promote San Diego as a cruise destination and homeport. Three years later, the B Street Pier Cruise Ship Terminal was officially dedicated. That year, over 26,000 passengers embarked and disembarked at the terminal.

In 1990, The Pasha Group began importing vehicles (Isuzu-branded vehicles) at the National City Marine Terminal. A total of 15,589 vehicle units were imported the first year. In 1993, the port and Tenth Avenue Cold Storage Company celebrated the grand opening of San Diego's first on-dock cold storage facility, built for $11 million, at the Tenth Avenue Marine Terminal. In 2001, the Board of Port Commissioners announced a 20-year lease with Dole Food Company. This signified the port's entry into the refrigerated containerized cargo market. Dole ships 1.8 billion pounds of bananas annually. In 2012, the port signed a new lease with Dole Food Company for an additional 24 1/2 years running to 2037.

On July 13, 2016, Vice President Joe Biden gave a speech at the Tenth Avenue Marine Terminal. In July 2022, the port held a groundbreaking for the $1.35 billion resort hotel and convention center on the Chula Vista Bayfront. The resort, the Gaylord Pacific, opened in May 2025.

==== San Diego International Airport ====
The port district operated Lindbergh Field, now San Diego International Airport, and its 1964 bond paid for a new air terminal. In 2001, state senator Steve Peace co-wrote legislation that separated the airport from the port and created the San Diego County Regional Airport Authority. The authority took over the airport in January 2003, and about 200 port employees moved to it.

==== San Diego Convention Center ====
After city voters approved a waterfront convention center in 1983, the port paid for its construction on port land, at a cost of $164 million. The San Diego Convention Center opened on November 24, 1989. In 1994, the city and the port agreed to fund a $140 million second phase, for which the port provided 11 acres (4.5 ha) of adjacent waterfront land. The expansion opened in 2001. In 2018, the city, the port and Fifth Avenue Landing, the leaseholder of an adjacent parcel, approved a settlement aimed at securing land for a third phase.

== Governance ==
The state legislature created the San Diego Unified Port District in 1962 through the San Diego Unified Port District Act (the Port Act), which placed San Diego Bay under a single regional agency. Tidelands that the state had granted to the cities around the bay were transferred to the district, which holds them in trust for the public under the public trust doctrine. As a grantee of state trust lands, the district files reports with the California State Lands Commission on the revenue and expenditures from them. In its financial reports, the district describes itself as "a self-funded public corporation and government agency". It has the authority to levy taxes but has not done so since 1970.

The district is governed by the seven-member Board of Port Commissioners, whose members serve four-year terms. The San Diego City Council appoints three commissioners, and the city councils of Chula Vista, Coronado, Imperial Beach and National City appoint one each. Each year the board elects a chair, vice chair and secretary from among its members. The board sets policy and appoints a president and chief executive officer to lead the agency.

=== Port Master Plan ===
The Port Act and the California Coastal Act require the district to maintain a Port Master Plan, which sets the permitted land and water uses throughout its jurisdiction. The port compares it to a city's general plan. The California Coastal Commission certifies the plan and each amendment to it; it certified the original plan on October 14, 1980. Adding an area to the plan brings it under the district's coastal permitting jurisdiction. The board approved a comprehensive update to the plan in February 2024; as of July 2026, it was awaiting certification by the Coastal Commission.

== Cargo facilities ==
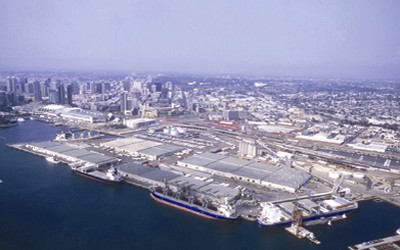
Tenth Avenue Marine Terminal

The Port of San Diego administers two marine cargo facilities: Tenth Avenue Marine Terminal and National City Marine Terminal.

The Tenth Avenue Marine Terminal is a 96-acre (39 ha) multi-purpose, eight-berth facility with a channel depth of 42 feet (13 m). Principal inbound cargo includes refrigerated and perishable commodities, fertilizer, cement, break-bulk cargo, and forest products. The terminal includes approximately 300,000-square-foot (28,000 m^{2}) of temperature-controlled warehouse space on-dock, along with covered storage and open laydown areas. Additional features include electric mobile harbor cranes, on-dock shore power and fueling capabilities, and on-site U.S. Customs and U.S. Department of Agriculture inspection services.

The National City Marine Terminal (NCMT), located at the southern end of San Diego Bay in National City, California, is a 135-acre (55 ha) facility owned by the Port of San Diego and operated by the Pasha Group. The terminal has four working berths with a channel depth of 35 feet (11 m) and direct on-dock access to rail. NCMT primarily handles automobile imports and exports for brands including Audi, Bentley, Chrysler, Fiat, Ford, GM, Hino, Honda, Hyundai, Isuzu, Itochu, Lamborghini, Mitsubishi Fuso, Porsche, Toyota, and Volkswagen. NCMT serves as the primary port of entry for one out of every ten new foreign cars shipped to the United States. Pasha also handles cargo to and from Hawaii, lumber shipments, and other project cargo at the terminal.

== Shipyards ==
Six shipyards operate on port tidelands: General Dynamics NASSCO, BAE Systems San Diego Ship Repair, Continental Maritime of San Diego, Austal USA, Marine Group Boat Works, and Nielsen Beaumont Marine. NASSCO, in Barrio Logan, is the largest shipyard on the West Coast of the United States. The BAE Systems yard occupies 20 acres (8.1 ha) of land and more than 16.6 acres (6.7 ha) of water leased from the port, north of Naval Base San Diego. Continental Maritime, formerly a subsidiary of Huntington Ingalls Industries, was acquired by Titan Acquisition Holdings in 2020. In 2021, Austal USA took over Marine Group Boat Works' 15-acre (6.1 ha) shipyard lease in National City, and Marine Group moved its yacht and commercial repair work to its yard in Chula Vista.

== Cruise facilities ==
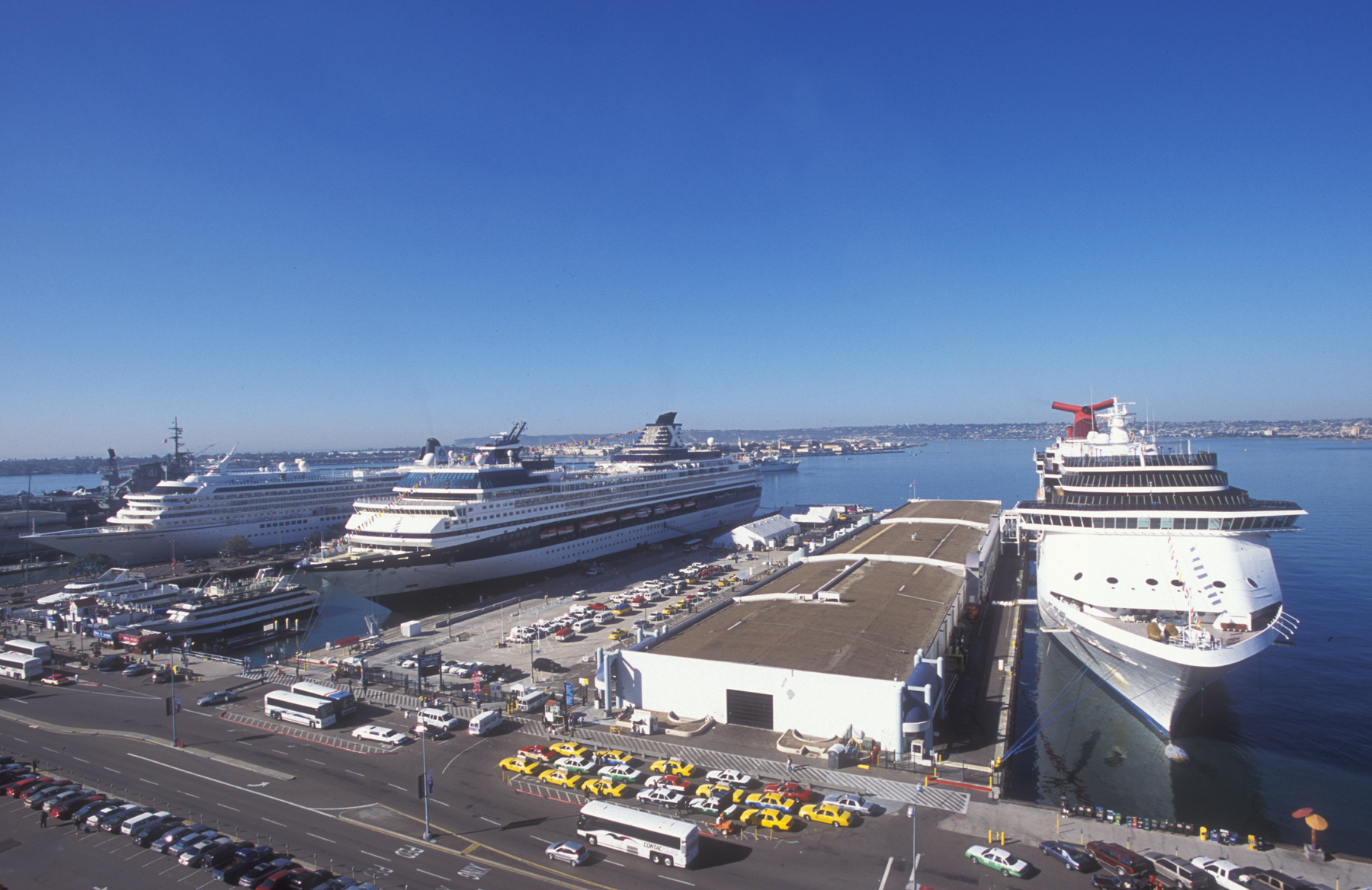
Port of San Diego B Street (right) and Broadway (far left) cruise terminals

The port's cruise facilities are located along North Harbor Drive in downtown San Diego. The primary facility is the B Street Cruise Ship Terminal which comprises approximately 120,000 square feet (11,000 m^{2}) of space, and its pier measures 1,000 feet (300 m) in length and 400 feet (120 m) in width. It has two berths, each 1,000 feet (300 m) long with a depth of 31.5 feet (9.6 m), two shore power connections, a passenger boarding bridge at the north berth, and on-site U.S. Customs and Border Protection (CBP) facilities.

Immediately to the south, the Port of San Diego constructed the Port Pavilion on the historic Broadway Pier. Opened in December 2010, the 52,000-square-foot (4,800 m^{2}) facility functions primarily as an overflow terminal when two ships are berthed at B Street and an additional vessel requires a berth. The pier measures 1,000 feet (300 m) in length and 135 feet (41 m) in width and has a single berth of the same length and depth as B Street. The facility includes one shore power connection, a passenger boarding bridge, and CBP facilities. When not in use for cruise operations, the building may be rented for private events, and the pier serves as a public space with a viewing area overlooking San Diego Bay.

The Port of San Diego installed shore power for cruise ships in 2010, becoming one of the first California ports to offer the capability. The Port Pavilion earned LEED Gold certification and incorporates environmentally focused features, including a 60 kW solar panel system. In 2023, shore power capacity at the B Street and Broadway Pier terminals was expanded to allow two cruise ships to connect simultaneously.

As of 2025, San Diego is California's third-busiest cruise port, after Long Beach and Los Angeles. The port recorded 75 cruise ship calls in the 2024–25 season and 109 in 2025–26. The 2026–27 season opened on September 14, 2026, with 183 scheduled calls and more than 700,000 expected passengers, which the port described as its largest season in more than 15 years. That season, Norwegian Cruise Line entered its second year of homeport sailings, Royal Caribbean International began homeporting in San Diego, and Disney Cruise Line based two ships there, the Disney Wonder and the Disney Magic.

Cruise activity at the Port of San Diego grew significantly in the early 2000s, increasing from 122 calls and 276,000 passengers in 2002 to 219 calls and 619,000 passengers in 2006. Activity peaked in 2008 with 252 calls and more than 800,000 passengers. By 2011, ship calls had declined to 103, a decrease attributed to the economic downturn and concerns about travel to Mexico amid widely reported violence. Following efforts to revitalize the Mexican Riviera market, cruise activity began to recover in the mid-2010s. Ship calls increased from 68 in the 2014–15 season to 102 in 2015–16, driven in part by deployments from Holland America Line and Disney Cruise Line. In the 2019–20 season, the port projected approximately 92 calls and nearly 300,000 passengers.

=== Notable events ===
In November 2010, the disabled cruise ship Carnival Splendor was towed to the San Diego cruise terminal after drifting for four days without power following an engine room fire.

On May 7, 2013, Celebrity Cruises' Solstice became the longest cruise ship to berth at the B Street Pier.

Ships sometimes make unscheduled stops in San Diego because of storm warnings along the Mexico cruise route. During one such diverted call in 2018, San Diego hosted the largest cruise ship ever to dock there, the 4,500-passenger Norwegian Bliss. The largest ships that normally call in San Diego hold 3,000 passengers.

=== Cruise lines and destinations ===
As of November 2026, the following cruise lines offer one-way voyages from San Diego during the 2026–27 season. Destinations listed under Mid-voyage boarding are reached on voyages that begin at another port and take on passengers at San Diego.

Destinations of one-way cruises from San Diego, 2026–27 season
Cruise line	Destinations	Refs
Azamara	Mid-voyage boarding: Copenhagen, London–Tilbury, Miami	
Crystal	Lima–Callao, Papeete, Vancouver; Mid-voyage boarding: Guayaquil, New York, Panama City	
Disney Cruise Line	Galveston, Vancouver	
Holland America Line	Fort Lauderdale, Miami, Vancouver	
MSC Cruises	Mid-voyage boarding: Miami	
Norwegian Cruise Line	Miami	
Princess Cruises	Fort Lauderdale	
Royal Caribbean International	Vancouver	

Most sailings from San Diego are round trips. Short cruises to Ensenada and Catalina Island and week-long Mexican Riviera cruises run through the season, while longer voyages to the Gulf of California, Hawaii and French Polynesia sail mainly between October and April.

Round-trip cruises from San Diego, 2026–27 season
Region	Cruise lines	Ports of call	Refs
Baja California	Disney Cruise Line, Royal Caribbean International	Ensenada, Avalon (Catalina Island)	
Mexican Riviera	Crystal, Disney Cruise Line, Holland America Line, Norwegian Cruise Line, Royal Caribbean International	Cabo San Lucas, La Paz, Manzanillo, Mazatlán, Puerto Vallarta	
Gulf of California	Crystal, Holland America Line	Guaymas, La Paz, Loreto, Topolobampo	
Hawaii	Holland America Line	Hilo, Honolulu, Kahului, Kailua-Kona, Nawiliwili	
Hawaii and French Polynesia	Holland America Line	Hawaii, Bora Bora, Nuku Hiva, Papeete, Rangiroa	
California coast	Holland America Line	Avalon, San Francisco, Ensenada	

Cruise destination maps
North American destinations
Voyages beginning in San Diego
Mid-voyage boarding at San Diego
Intercontinental destinations
Voyages beginning in San Diego
Mid-voyage boarding at San Diego

== Ferry service ==
Ferries carried passengers between San Diego and Coronado from 1886 until the San Diego–Coronado Bridge opened in 1969, and passenger service resumed in 1987. Flagship Cruises & Events runs the service from Broadway Pier and from Fifth Avenue Landing, behind the San Diego Convention Center, to the Coronado Ferry Landing. The Coronado Ferry Landing, a complex of shops and restaurants at the Coronado terminal, is on port land and is operated by Port Coronado Associates under a lease from the port.

A route between Fifth Avenue Landing and the Chula Vista Bayfront, operated by Flagship in partnership with the port, began service on June 1, 2026. According to the port's board chair, a ferry terminal had been part of the Chula Vista Bayfront Master Plan from its start. In 2025, the California Air Resources Board awarded Flagship a grant of about $15 million toward two battery-electric ferries for the Coronado routes, a project on which the port partnered with Flagship and the San Diego County Air Pollution Control District.

=== Ferry landings ===
Flagship Ferry terminals
Terminal	Location	Connections
Broadway Pier	Downtown San Diego	MTS: Rapid Express 280, Rapid Express 290, 923, 992 Santa Fe Depot: Blue Line Green Line; Pacific Surfliner; Coaster; MTS: 83, Rapid 215, Rapid 225, Rapid 235
Convention Center (Fifth Avenue) Landing	Gaslamp Quarter, San Diego	Gaslamp Quarter station: Green Line Silver Line
Coronado Ferry Landing	Coronado	MTS: 904
Chula Vista Ferry Landing	Chula Vista	Chula Vista Bayfront Shuttle (Green)

== Fisheries ==
Fisheries are one of the uses the port promotes on and around San Diego Bay, along with commerce, navigation and recreation. According to the port, tuna fishing and processing was San Diego's third-largest industry in the 1960s, after aerospace and the U.S. Navy. The Tunaman's Memorial, a sculpture by Franco Vianello, stands in Shelter Island Shoreline Park.

=== Commercial fishing ===
San Diego's commercial fishing fleet uses two harbors on the bay, Tuna Harbor and Driscoll's Wharf. Tuna Harbor, also called the Tuna Boat Basin, is downtown on the south side of the G Street Mole. The basin has three floating docks along with the Tuna Boat Pier, Fish Harbor Pier and Fish Market Wharf, and 5.4 acres (2.2 ha) of land and 13.1 acres (5.3 ha) of water in the area are designated for commercial fishing. In August 2014, Tuna Harbor Dockside Market opened on Fish Harbor Pier as a weekly open-air market where local fishermen sell their catch to the public. The port, the County of San Diego and the fishermen worked together to establish it.

Driscoll's Wharf, on America's Cup Harbor in Roseville-Fleetridge, Point Loma, was privately operated on a port lease. In late 2022 the port declined to renew the lease and began planning to redevelop the site itself as the Shelter Island Commercial Fishing Wharf. The port, as lead agency, issued a notice of preparation for the project's environmental impact report in December 2024.

=== Recreational fishing ===
Sportfishing boats operate from landings on America's Cup Harbor, including H&M Landing, Point Loma Sportfishing and Fisherman's Landing. H&M Landing has operated since 1935. The annual Port of San Diego Day at the Docks, held at the landings in April, marks the start of Southern California's spring saltwater fishing season.

Port parks with public fishing piers include Harbor Park (formerly Bayside Park) in Chula Vista, Portwood Pier Plaza in Imperial Beach, Pepper Park in National City and Shelter Island in San Diego. No fishing license is required on these piers. The port completed a $2.6 million maintenance project on the Imperial Beach Pier in July 2025.

== Parks and recreation ==
The port maintains 23 public parks on tidelands in its member cities. They include Shelter Island and Embarcadero Marina Park in San Diego, Tidelands Park in Coronado, Pepper Park in National City, Portwood Pier Plaza in Imperial Beach and Harbor Park (formerly Bayside Park) in Chula Vista. The port's parks and recreation department also manages public boat launches, fishing piers, event venues and a public art collection.

The port operates three of the four public boat launch ramps on San Diego Bay, at Shelter Island, Pepper Park and Chula Vista; the fourth, at Glorietta Bay, is run by the City of Coronado. It also administers the bay's anchorages and moorings, and a guest dock at Shelter Island for visiting boats. Marinas are among the businesses that lease port land.

== Environment ==
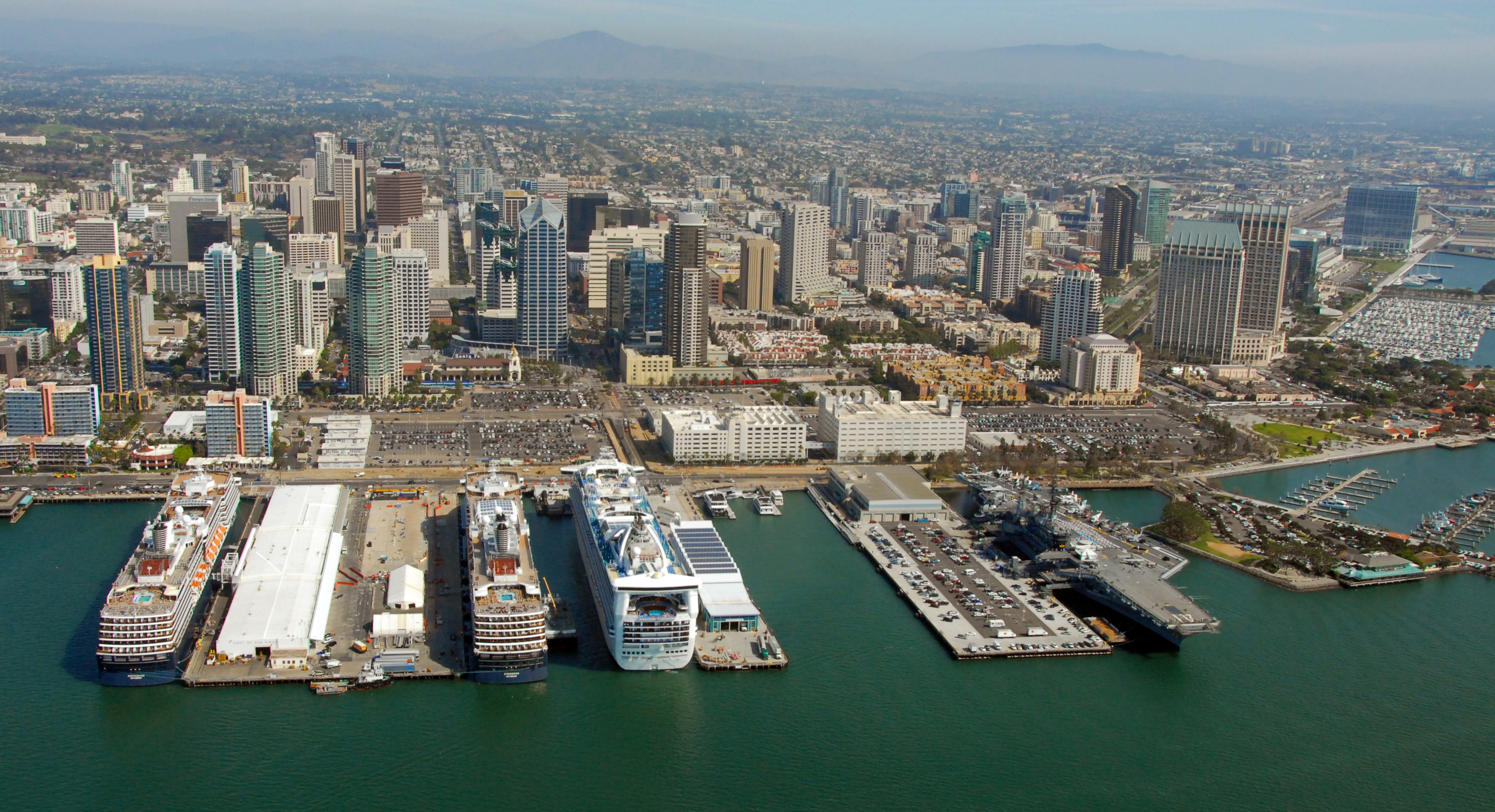
Overhead view of the Port of San Diego

The port's environmental programs on San Diego Bay include storm water and endangered species management, the removal of hazardous waste and contaminated sediments, and pollution-prevention education for adults and schoolchildren. The port has helped restore or enhance more than 280 acres (110 ha) of habitat, including Emory Cove and the Chula Vista Wildlife Reserve. Its Green Business Network is a voluntary program that offers sustainability resources to businesses along the waterfront.

In October 2021, the Board of Port Commissioners adopted the Maritime Clean Air Strategy (MCAS). It updates the port's 2007 Clean Air Program, and its stated vision is "Health Equity for All". One of its goals is for all trucks serving the port's cargo terminals to be zero-emission by 2030. The port identifies Barrio Logan, West National City, Logan Heights and Sherman Heights as Portside Communities, those historically most affected by poor air quality.

The port first installed shore power at its cruise terminals in 2010 and added it at the Tenth Avenue Marine Terminal in 2014. On October 29, 2025, Pasha Hawaii's MV Jean Anne connected to a new shore power system at the National City Marine Terminal. It was the first roll-on/roll-off vessel in the United States to be commissioned for shore power. With that system in place, all four of the port's marine terminals had shore power. The National City terminal also has a bonnet system, which captures exhaust from vessels at berth. The port added the plug at a cost of $6.6 million. In March 2026, the board awarded a $1.4 million contract to install shore power for commercial fishing vessels at Fish Harbor Pier.

== Waterfront development ==
The district's jurisdiction extends along 34 miles (55 km) of San Diego Bay in its five member cities and covers 2,616 acres (1,059 ha) of land and 11,516 acres (4,660 ha) of water. More than 600 businesses operate on port property, including hotels, restaurants, shops, marinas and museums. Real estate produced $117.8 million of the port's $213.4 million in operating revenue in fiscal year 2025.

=== Hotels ===
The port's tenants include 17 hotels, among them the 40-story Manchester Grand Hyatt Hotel, the 25-story Marriott Marquis San Diego Marina and the San Diego InterContinental. The port also hosts hotels in Point Loma, Harbor Island, and Shelter Island. On the Chula Vista Bayfront, the 1,600-room Gaylord Pacific Resort & Convention Center, built by the port, the city of Chula Vista and the developer RIDA, opened on May 15, 2025.

=== Attractions ===
The USS Midway Museum occupies Navy Pier under a lease from the port; the Navy conveyed the pier to the port in 2003. It and the Maritime Museum of San Diego are on the North Embarcadero. Seaport Village, a dining and retail center, is owned by the port and has been managed by a private operator since 2018.

=== Redevelopment projects ===
The Chula Vista Bayfront Master Plan, prepared jointly by the port and the City of Chula Vista, was approved by the California Coastal Commission in August 2012 and is being carried out in phases. The first phase includes the Gaylord Pacific resort and convention center, Sweetwater Park, a 39-acre (16 ha) park that opened in April 2025, and the expansion of Harbor Park from about 12 to 25 acres (4.9 to 10.1 ha).

The National City Balanced Plan, developed with the City of National City for the bayfront area around Pier 32 Marina and Pepper Park, was certified by the Coastal Commission in December 2025. It expands Pepper Park by 2.5 acres (1.0 ha), moves Marina Way to form a buffer between maritime and commercial areas, and adds public access corridors. The marina's owner has proposed an RV park and up to two hotels in the area.

On East Harbor Island, the port proposes to replace rental car lots and other industrial uses with a Topgolf entertainment venue and a waterfront park. The port released the project's draft environmental impact report in July 2026.

In 2016, the board selected a proposal by the developer 1HWY1 to redevelop the Central Embarcadero, including Seaport Village, as Seaport San Diego. The board authorized environmental review of the project in November 2022. In 2024, the board extended the developer's deadline for obtaining approvals and financing to October 1, 2027.

=== Blue economy ===
In 2016, the port established the Blue Economy Incubator, which funds pilot projects by early-stage aquaculture and blue technology companies in and around San Diego Bay. By June 2026, the board had approved 14 pilot project agreements. Early projects included the first commercial shellfish aquaculture operation in San Diego Bay and a submerged seaweed farm.

== Port of San Diego Harbor Police ==
The Port of San Diego Harbor Police Department is the port district's law enforcement agency. It has about 140 sworn officers and patrols port property in the five member cities of Chula Vista, Coronado, Imperial Beach, National City and San Diego. The department also handles marine firefighting on San Diego Bay, and the San Diego County Regional Airport Authority contracts with it for police services at San Diego International Airport. Magda Fernandez, a 21-year veteran of the department, became its chief in May 2022, the first Latina police chief in San Diego County.

== See also ==
- List of ports in the United States
- Port of Hueneme
- Port of Long Beach
- Port of Los Angeles
- Port of Oakland
- Port of San Francisco
- Port of Seattle
- Port of Vancouver
- Port of Ensenada
