= Ellis Island Honors Society =

American nonprofit organization

The Ellis Island Honors Society (EIHS) is a United States 501(c)(3) organization whose mission is to honor and preserve cultural diversity and to foster tolerance, respect and understanding among ethnic groups. The EIHS was founded in 1984 as the National Ethnic Coalition of Organizations (NECO) and adopted its current name in 2017. The EIHS awards the "Ellis Island Medal of Honor" to naturalized or native-born American citizens "who preserve and celebrate the history, traditions and values of their [ethnic heritage] while exemplifying the values of the American way of life".

NECO was founded by William Denis Fugazy Sr in June 1984 in response to discontent with the choice of 12 recipients of the "Medal of Liberty" awarded as part of ABC's Liberty Weekend celebration of the Statue of Liberty's pre-centennial renovation. A committee appointed by ABC producer David L. Wolper was tasked with selecting eminent living immigrants, and Fugazy was among those who felt many prominent immigrant communities were unrepresented. Fugazy, a real-estate agent and founder in 1984 of the Coalition of Italo-American Associations, mentioned in particular Italian Americans, Irish Americans, and Polish Americans. Committee member Arthur Schlesinger Jr pointed out that most Irish and Italian Americans were not first-generation and therefore ineligible. The Statue of Liberty-Ellis Island Foundation, which had cooperated with the Medal of Liberty award, agreed to co-operate with NECO on the Ellis Island Medals of Honor. A Congressional resolution of October 10, 1986, endorsed the awards. Fugazy awarded the first 80 Ellis Island Medals of Honor on October 27, 1986; recipients present included Joe DiMaggio, Victor Borge, Anita Bryant, Muhammad Ali, Rosa Parks, and Donald Trump (a business associate of Fugazy).

In 1992, they hired a steamroller to crush Sinéad O'Connor's records after she tore up a picture of Pope John Paul II on the late-night show Saturday Night Live to protest the Catholic church's involvement in child abuse.

In 2018, Ellis Island Honors Society communications director confirmed that Donald Trump was a 1986 recipient of the Ellis Island Medals of Honor and that a photo of the event with Trump alongside Muhammad Ali and Rosa Parks was authentic. Trump was honored for his work as a successful developer in New York City and his German heritage.

Seven U.S. presidents are among those who have been nominated, along with both celebrities and ordinary people. From 1987 to 1990, NECO gave booby prizes called "Golden Pit Awards" to television shows and motion pictures which exploited ethnic stereotypes. In 2004, Charles Rangel paid tribute to NECO in the U.S. House of Representatives, stating NECO was a coalition of 143 ethnic interest groups. Fugazy was succeeded as head of NECO by Nasser J. Kazeminy. In 2011, a disgruntled former Board member erroneously alleged that NECO was mis-allocating funds and exchanging subsidies with member organizations. The allegation was acknowledged and never followed up by the NY Attorney General office. It ultimately proved baseless.

Lee Iacocca, a friend of Fugazy Sr and Kazeminy, was co-chairman until 2012.

In 2016, Ellis Island Honors Society awarded Wendy Diamond the Ellis Island Medal of Honor in recognition of her humanitarian efforts.
