= Judge Lifland =

Judge Lifland may refer to:

- Burton Lifland (1929–2014), judge for the United States Bankruptcy Court for the Southern District of New York
- John C. Lifland (born 1933), judge of the United States District Court for the District of New Jersey
