= Lifland =

Lifland is a surname. Notable people with the surname include:

- Burton Lifland (1929–2014), American judge
- John C. Lifland (born 1933), American judge

== See also ==
- Lífland, a place noted in the runic accounts of Viking chieftain Freygeirr as the place where his son died.
