= Judge Whipple =

Judge Whipple may refer to:

- Dean Whipple (born 1938), judge of the United States District Court for the Western District of Missouri
- Lawrence Aloysius Whipple (1910–1983), judge of the United States District Court for the District of New Jersey
