= Ira Schreck =

American entertainment lawyer

- Education: State University of New York at New Paltz (BA); Columbia Law School (JD)
- Occupation: Entertainment lawyer
- Years active: 1981–present
- Employer(s): Schreck Rose Dapello Adams Berlin & Dunham LLP
- Awards: The Hollywood Reporter Legal Legend (2023)

Ira Schreck is an American entertainment lawyer based in New York City. He is a founding partner of Schreck Rose Dapello Adams Berlin & Dunham LLP and served as the firm's Managing Partner for the first 25 years of its operation. He is recognized for his representation of high-profile talent in film, television, and theater.

== Early life and education ==
Schreck graduated with honors from the State University of New York at New Paltz in 1974, earning a Bachelor of Arts in philosophy. He later attended Columbia Law School, where he was designated both a Kent Scholar and a Stone Scholar for academic excellence.

In 2026 Schreck delivered the commencement address at his alma mater SUNY New Paltz. He was awarded an honorary doctorate of humane letters degrees, the State University of New York's highest recognition.

== Career ==
Schreck was admitted to the New York State and Washington, D.C., Bars in 1981. He began his legal career clerking for Federal District Court Judge H. Lee Sarokin. He subsequently practiced as an associate at the law firm Arnold & Porter in Washington, D.C.

In 1985, Schreck joined CBS/Fox Video as associate counsel during the expansion of the home video industry. He later became a partner at Frankfurt, Garbus, Klein & Selz, where he practiced for ten years before leaving in 1999 to found Schreck Rose & Dapello (currently Schreck Rose Dapello Adams Berlin & Dunham LLP). He was admitted to the California Bar in 1999.

=== Notable representations ===
Schreck's practice focuses on representing writers, directors, and actors. He has represented Sarah Jessica Parker for more than 35 years, including her deals for the HBO series Sex and the City, its theatrical film adaptations, and the revival series And Just Like That....

He has maintained a long-term professional relationship with director Ang Lee, handling deals for Lee's films including Crouching Tiger, Hidden Dragon (2000), Brokeback Mountain (2005), and Life of Pi (2012). Schreck has been acknowledged in various award acceptance speeches by clients, including Lee at the 78th and 85th Academy Awards, Kyra Sedgwick at the 2007 Golden Globe Awards, and Rachel Brosnahan at the 2019 Screen Actors Guild Awards. Other notable clients include Kevin Hart, Tony Kushner, Jason Katims, Tony Goldwyn, and Marcia Gay Harden.

=== Recognition ===
Schreck is consistently cited as a top attorney in professional industry rankings. He was included in The Hollywood Reporter's "Power Lawyers" list, appearing in at least ten annual editions between 2011 and 2022. This recognition culminated in 2023, when he was named as one of five "Legal Legends" by The Hollywood Reporter. Additionally, Schreck is frequently featured in Variety's Legal Impact Report and the annual Chambers and Partners rankings for Media and Entertainment.

== Theater and investments ==
Schreck has been an investor in stage productions since 2014. His investment portfolio includes the musical Hamilton, the Pulitzer Prize-winning play Sweat, Jagged Little Pill, Tina: The Tina Turner Musical, Hearts Beat Loud, and Gutenberg! The Musical!. Schreck’s international theatrical involvement includes the West End production of Waitress and the London production of The Hitchhiker's Guide to the Galaxy.

== Philanthropy and board memberships ==
Schreck serves on the board of directors of Opening Act, a nonprofit providing theater programs to high-need New York City high schools. He is also a board member of the SUNY New Paltz Foundation and a board member of Ruach, a nonprofit focused on Jewish meditation and movement.

Schreck served several terms on the Board of Trustees for Second Stage Theater and contributed to the renovation of the Helen Hayes Theater. He is a member of the Mohonk Preserve Visitor Experience Committee in Ulster County, New York. In 2020, Schreck and his wife established the Student Psychological Resilience Project Fund at SUNY New Paltz to provide students with peer advocacy training and stress-coping skills.

== Personal life ==
Schreck and his wife, Barbara Ginsberg, live in High Falls, New York, which became their primary residence in 2019. They have two sons.
