= Macy's 4th of July Fireworks =

Fireworks show in New York City

- 2024 poster for the event
- Also known as: Macy's 4th of July Fireworks Spectacular
- Country of origin: United States
- Original language: English

Production
- Production location: New York City
- Camera setup: Multi-camera
- Production companies: Jesse Collins Entertainment; Macy's; Universal Television

Original release
- Network: WPIX
- Release: July 4, 1983 – July 4, 1990
- Network: Syndication
- Release: July 4, 1991 – July 4, 1999
- Network: NBC
- Release: July 4, 2000 – present

The Macy's 4th of July Fireworks is an annual Independence Day fireworks display held in New York City. The fireworks show, usually held over the East River or Hudson River, has been sponsored by Macy's, Inc. each year since 1976, with the exception of 1986 when that year's fireworks display was held as part of Liberty Weekend, marking the restoration and centenary of the Statue of Liberty. In recent years, the fireworks have been preceded by live entertainment.

The event has been televised as a special since 1983 (billed as the Macy's 4th of July Fireworks Spectacular), originally airing on WPIX, and syndicated nationally beginning in 1991. In 2000, the special moved to NBC, where it has been broadcast ever since; NBC's contract runs through 2035, and is bundled with its rights to the Macy's Thanksgiving Day Parade.

== History ==
=== Background ===
The first Macy's fireworks show in New York City was held on July 1, 1958 to celebrate the department store's 100th anniversary. The 36-minute-long show was directed by Japanese fireworks expert Toshio Ogatsu and set off from four barges anchored in the Hudson River across from 85th Street on Manhattan's Upper West Side. Flight patterns for La Guardia and Idlewild airports were modified during the fireworks display and spectators leaving the event in New Jersey created a traffic jam on Boulevard East in North Bergen that police described as "the worst traffic tieup since Navy Day in 1942." Some local residents did not even know what the fireworks were for and one woman said, "I thought they were celebrating the statehood of Alaska."

From 1959 to 1964, Macy's continued to sponsor an annual fireworks display called "Fireworks-on-the-Hudson" as part of New York's Summer Festival. A tragedy struck the fireworks display held on June 23, 1964 when a defective shell failed to climb and ignited the other shells on one of the four barges in the river, killing two men and injuring four others. After the accident, Fire Commissioner Edward Thompson mentioned that a ban of similar fireworks displays was being considered by the city, unless remote control was used to set off the pyrotechnics.

=== 1970s to 1980s ===
In 1976, Macy's partnered with The Walt Disney Company to hold a fireworks display in honor of the United States' bicentennial, leading to the show becoming an annual tradition on the 4th of July. The first show was held in Upper New York Bay, with fireworks being launched from three barges in the harbor as well as points on Ellis Island, Governors Island and Liberty Island. The half-hour-long fireworks display was preceded by a three minute gun salute from naval ships in the harbor and also included a helicopter carrying a 60-by-100-foot (18 by 30 m) illuminated American flag while the crowd sang the national anthem along to the music on their transistor radios. A Circle Line vessel carrying New York Mayor Abraham Beame, Police Commissioner Michael Codd, Macy's president Edward Finkelstein, and 500 guests of the department store chain was temporarily commandeered by the Coast Guard and detained for 20 minutes on Governors Island after the boat got too close to one of the barges shooting off fireworks.

Beginning in 1977, the Macy's fireworks show was held on the Hudson River adjacent to Manhattan's Upper West Side (between 83rd and 102nd streets). In 1979, the fireworks were forced to be launched from a Conrail-owned property in West New York on the New Jersey side of the Hudson (in lieu of barges in the river) due to the effects of a recent tugboat strike. That year, the fireworks also had to be launched manually because the wires between the shells and controls had been cut by vandals. The fireworks were moved back to Upper New York Bay in 1981 at the request of New York City Mayor Ed Koch after Upper West Side residents had complained about the amount of trash spectators had left after the fireworks display the prior year.

The event was held on the East River for the first time in 1983, with the fireworks show taking place between 23rd and 42nd streets. The FDR Drive alongside the river was closed to traffic between Houston and 49th streets to accommodate spectators viewing the pyrotechnics. The New York Police Department (NYPD) estimated that more than a million people came to the waterfront to watch the fireworks display.

In 1986, Macy's did not host the event, as the fireworks show was held as part of Liberty Weekend, marking the restoration and centenary of the Statue of Liberty.

=== 1990s to 2000s ===
The fireworks display returned to the Hudson River, this time adjacent to Lower Manhattan, for a two-year stint in 1992 and 1993. The event in 1992 coincided with Op Sail '92, a parade of sailing vessels along the Hudson to commemorate the 500th anniversary of Christopher Columbus' discovery of the Americas.

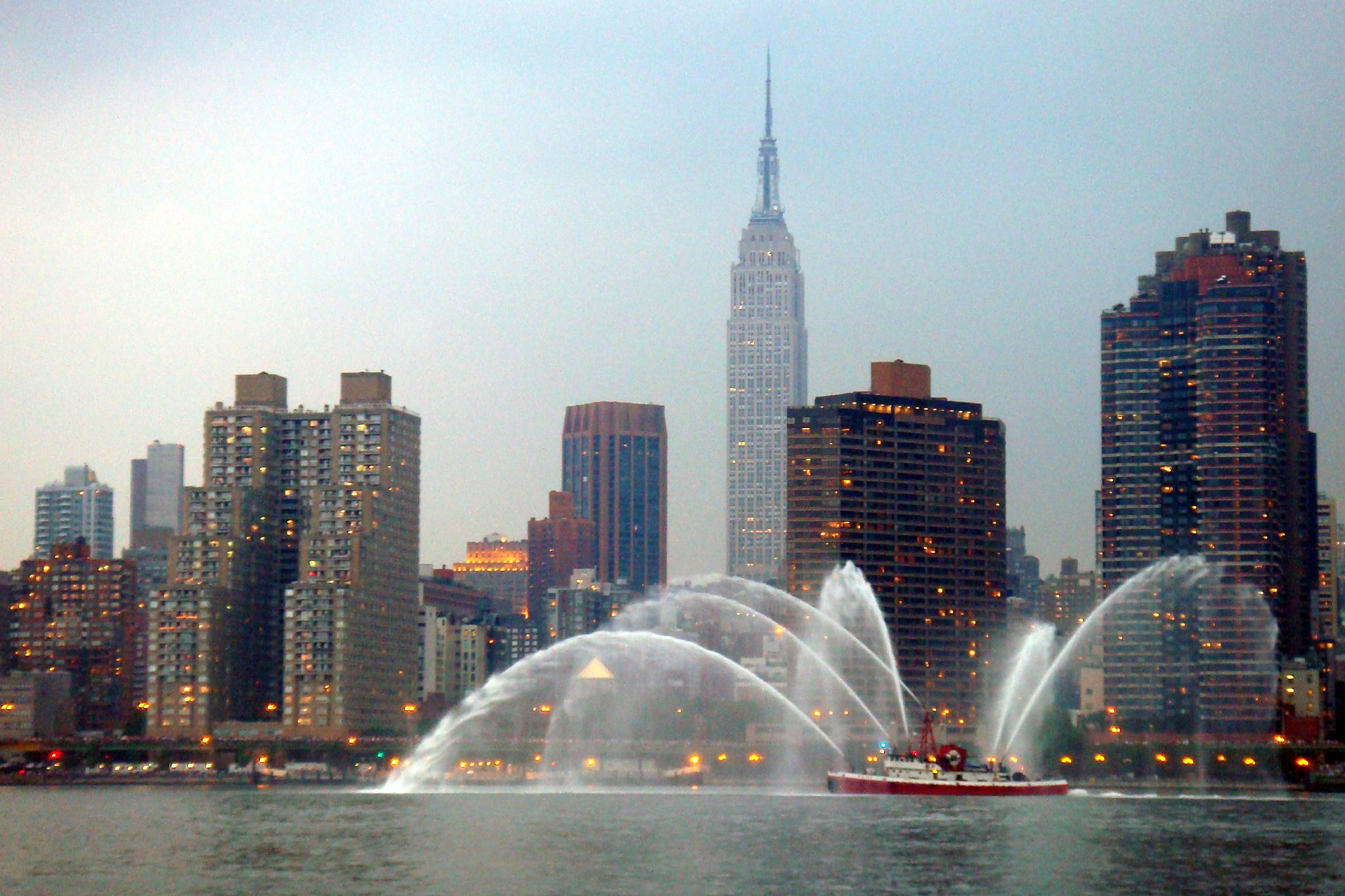
A fireboat gives a water salute before the fireworks display in 2008

The fireworks moved back to the East River in 1994 at the request of the mayor's office. That same year, Macy's merged with Federated Department Stores after it had filed for Chapter 11 bankruptcy protection. During a bankruptcy court hearing related to the merger, federal judge Burton Lifland required that Federated commit to continue holding the Macy's 4th of July Fireworks and Macy's Thanksgiving Day Parade each year. Lifland also noted that his preference was for the fireworks display to be held over the East River instead of the Hudson River—where it could be viewed by more New Yorkers—and said, "I don't know why we want to bring New Jersey in, except through the medium of TV."

To celebrate the new millennium in 2000, the fireworks display was expanded to four locations and included six barges on the East River between 19th and 38th streets, two barges on the East River near the South Street Seaport, two barges in The Narrows between Staten Island and Brooklyn, and two barges in the Hudson River near the USS Intrepid. An additional barge was located near the Statue of Liberty, but this launching point was only used for the show's finale.

New Jersey ended up again being brought in to the fireworks display when Jersey City agreed to sponsor the Macy's event in 2004 and 2005 to place an additional fireworks barge near the Statue of Liberty. However, after the city was unhappy about not being mentioned in promotional material from Macy's, it decided to stage its own fireworks display in 2006 that ended just 10 minutes before the Macy's fireworks on the East River. The New York City Fire Department (FDNY) initially declined to give Jersey City a permit to shoot off fireworks from the harbor the following year due to safety concerns regarding not having enough time to move its fireboats between the two displays and cited an 1834 compact between New York and New Jersey that gave New York "exclusive jurisdiction of and over all the waters of the bay of New York." Unwilling to conclude their fireworks display prior to 9:05 p.m. (before the sky was dark) and provide the minimum buffer time between events requested by FDNY, Jersey City officials instead opted to shoot off their fireworks display from land at Liberty State Park.

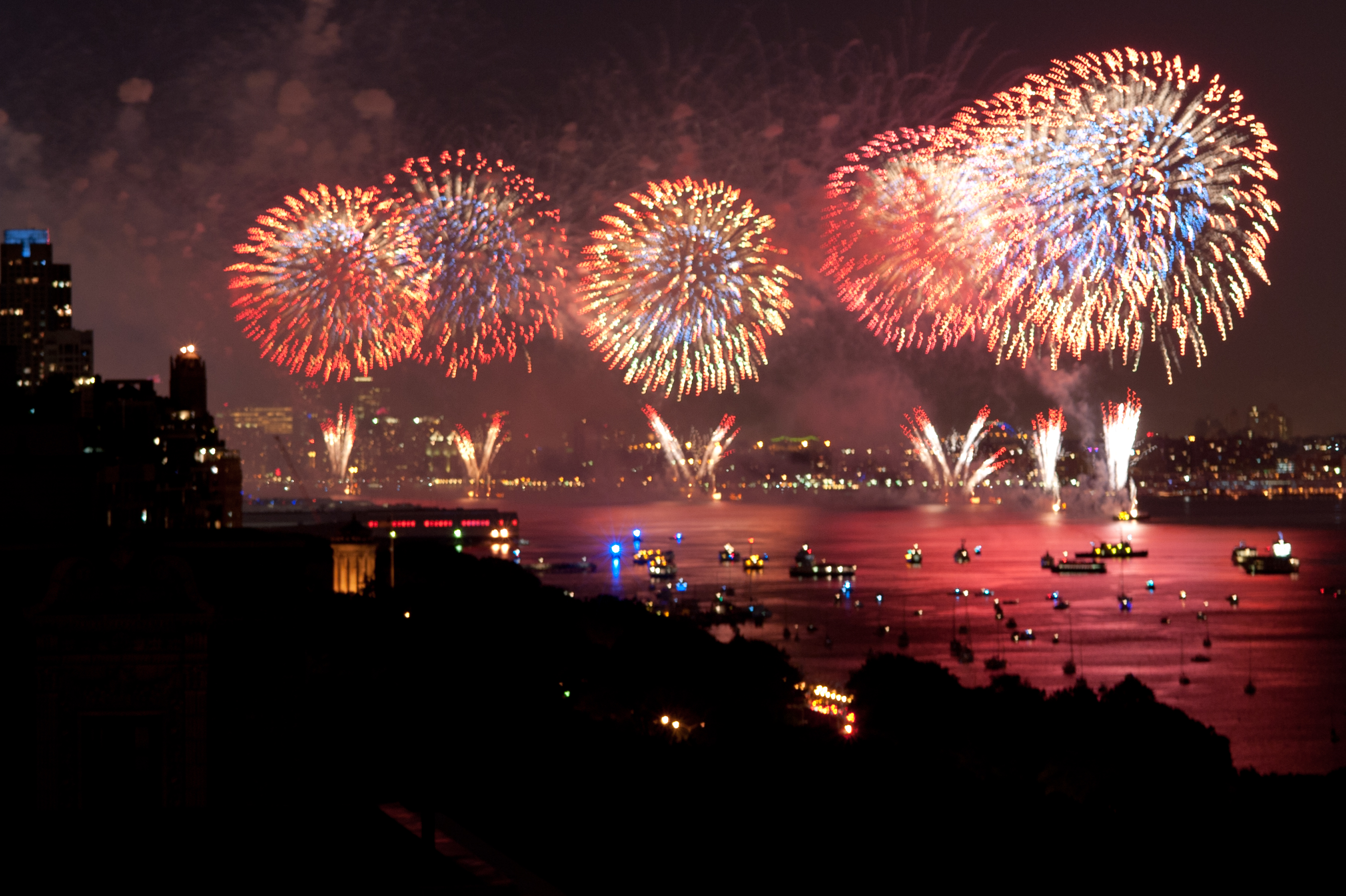
The fireworks display over the Hudson River in 2011

After years of the event again being held on the East River, the show was moved back to the Hudson River in 2009 to commemorate the 400th anniversary of explorer Henry Hudson's arrival in New York Harbor and voyage up the river. That year, the fireworks were launched from six barges in the river adjacent to the Chelsea, Hell's Kitchen and Hudson Yards neighborhoods in Manhattan (between 23rd and 50th streets).

=== 2010s to present ===
Macy's wanted to hold the 2011 fireworks display in Upper New York Bay as a tribute to the 125th anniversary of the Statue of Liberty, and was given permission from the National Park Service to shoot off some of the fireworks from Liberty Island, but the proposed change in venue was nixed by city officials because they said Lower Manhattan wouldn't be able to handle the number of spectators.

In May 2013, for the first time in its history, organizers appointed a creative ambassador—R&B musician Usher—to develop the show's concept and soundtrack, which would carry the theme "It Begins with A Spark". Usher explained that the show would reflect "who we are as Americans and who we have evolved to be throughout the years, both good and bad, up and downs", and be "a merge of old and new"; it would feature renditions of "The Star-Spangled Banner" by Jimi Hendrix and the Slovak Radio Symphony Orchestra, and "America the Beautiful" by Blake Shelton and Miranda Lambert (at the time, both Shelton and Usher were coaches on The Voice, a music competition series aired by fireworks broadcaster NBC), as well as popular music by Frank Sinatra, Kanye West, Kelly Clarkson, Rihanna, Sam Cooke, Swedish House Mafia, and Usher. While the soundtrack did receive mixed reviews by some critics for its reliance on pop music (including several of Usher's own hits in particular), Usher stated that he enjoyed "looking out over the crowd to see all those faces, people of different ages and races" throughout the show. The NBC telecast had its highest viewership in a decade.

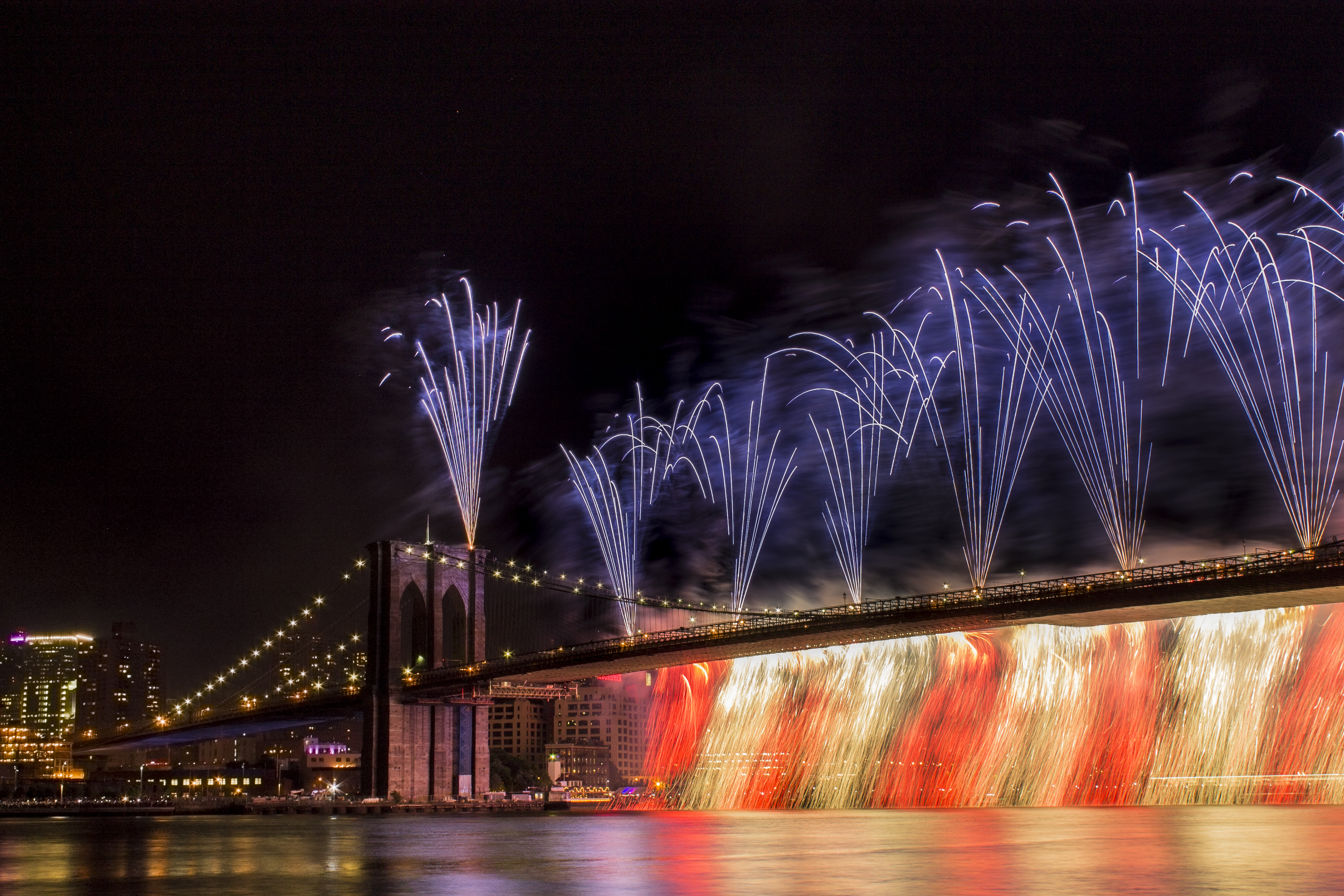
In 2014, the Brooklyn Bridge was used as a launching point for fireworks

The display was moved back to the East River in 2014. That year, the Brooklyn Bridge was used to launch some of the fireworks for the show, which required the bridge to be shut down for part of the day. In 2016, Macy's celebrated the event's 40th anniversary with a display featuring more than 56,000 effects, making it the largest show since 2000.

Amid COVID-19 restrictions in 2020, the event was spread out over a week across each borough of New York City. To discourage large crowds from gathering, 5-minute-long shows were held in different locations, without prior announcement, including the East River, Hudson River, Statue of Liberty, Coney Island, One Times Square, and Bronx Borough Hall. The finale, on July 4, was televised and featured a display from atop the Empire State Building.

The traditional Macy's fireworks display on the Fourth of July returned as a public viewing event on the East River in 2021, with the NYPD separating spectators into different areas along the waterfront between those that had received the COVID-19 vaccine from those that were unvaccinated. The 2021 display also included fireworks being simultaneously launched from the top of the Empire State Building.

The event in 2023 was the first to include a drone light show, which immediately preceded the fireworks display. A total of 500 drones flying over the East River were used to create designs such as the U.S. flag and the Statue of Liberty. On the day of the fireworks display, a team of researchers from NYU Langone Health assessed the effects of the fireworks on localized air pollution and water pollution. The results of their study showed a sharp rise in airborne particulates, with peak real-time measurements of PM_{2.5} exceeding 1,000 micrograms per cubic meter (0.012 gr/yd^{3}) at three sampling sites within 30 minutes after the conclusion of the show, which took several hours to return to pre-event levels. These measurements compared to average background levels of 15 micrograms per cubic meter (0.00018 gr/yd^{3}) in New York City and a maximum of 460 micrograms per cubic meter (0.0054 gr/yd^{3}) experienced in the local area during the Canadian wildfires in June 2023. The study also found increased levels of heavy metals in the river water that lasted for one hour after the fireworks ended.

The fireworks display returned to the Hudson River in 2024. Compared to the East River, the Hudson River is wider and allows for the use of larger shells in the fireworks display, some of which are up to 10 inches (250 mm) in diameter and weigh up to 30 pounds (14 kg). The 2024 event included the first-ever use of pyro-drones in a public show in the United States; the use of fireworks on drones had only been approved by the Federal Aviation Administration a few weeks before the event.

In 2025, the 49th edition of Macy's 4th of July fireworks display was launched from the Brooklyn Bridge and four barges on the East River near the South Street Seaport. The fireworks show had 80,000 shells and included a new effect consisting of a 1,400-foot (430 m) twinkling yellow waterfall that slowly fell from underneath the bridge. Prior to the event, new additions to the show were tested at a dry lake bed located in the Mojave Desert.

The 2026 fireworks display over the East River

The 2026 fireworks display, marking the 50th anniversary of the event as well as the United States Semiquincentennial, included fireworks launched from four barges on the East River near the South Street Seaport and two barges on the Hudson River near Jersey City. Some fireworks were also launched from the Brooklyn Bridge. New York City officials initially declined to give Macy’s a permit to shoot off fireworks from the Hudson River because of the demands that would be placed on the NYPD from other events occurring over the holiday weekend—including Sail250, the FIFA World Cup and the wedding of Taylor Swift and Travis Kelce—but ended up obtaining a permit from New Jersey. Macy's had originally planned to launch all of the fireworks from the East River, from locations near Midtown Manhattan and the South Street Seaport, but subsequently reduced the event's footprint to only include Lower Manhattan. The 2026 event started half an hour earlier at 9:02 p.m. due to the threat of thunderstorms in the Tri-State area. Despite that, the event featured 85,000 fireworks that lit up the sky in 30 colors from 6 barges.

=== Locations ===
Since 1976, the fireworks display sponsored by Macy's on the 4th of July has been held in five primary locations:

Location	No. hosted	Year(s) hosted
East River	34	1983–1985, 1987–1991, 1994–2008, 2014–2019, 2021–2023, 2025–2026
Empire State Building	1	2020
Hudson River	11	1977–1978, 1980, 1992–1993, 2009–2013, 2024
Upper New York Bay	3	1976, 1981–1982
West New York, New Jersey	1	1979

== Production ==
Since 1983, the show's fireworks displays have been provided by Pyro Spectaculars. In prior years, other companies that provided fireworks for the show included Zambelli Fireworks and Garden State Fireworks. The fireworks are launched from multiple barges on the waterfront, which are programmed to fire in time with the show's musical score. The 2024 show featured 60,000 fireworks, including a custom new firework called the "All American Shell".

When the fireworks display was held on the East River, The Water Club in the Kips Bay neighborhood of Manhattan was often used as a command center for the fireworks show as well as a filming location for the television broadcast. Hunters Point South Park in Long Island City has also been used as a command center and a television filming location for the fireworks displays held on the East River.

In 2009, the command center for the fireworks display over the Hudson River was located on the USS Intrepid and the aircraft carrier's flight deck was used as a stage for the television broadcast. The television broadcast for the 2010 show was held on the cruise ship Norwegian Epic, which had been christened in New York City two days earlier. Other command centers for the fireworks displays held over the Hudson River have included Riverside Park on the Upper West Side, piers within Hudson River Park, and the 6th Street Pier in the Newport section of Jersey City.

== Television coverage ==
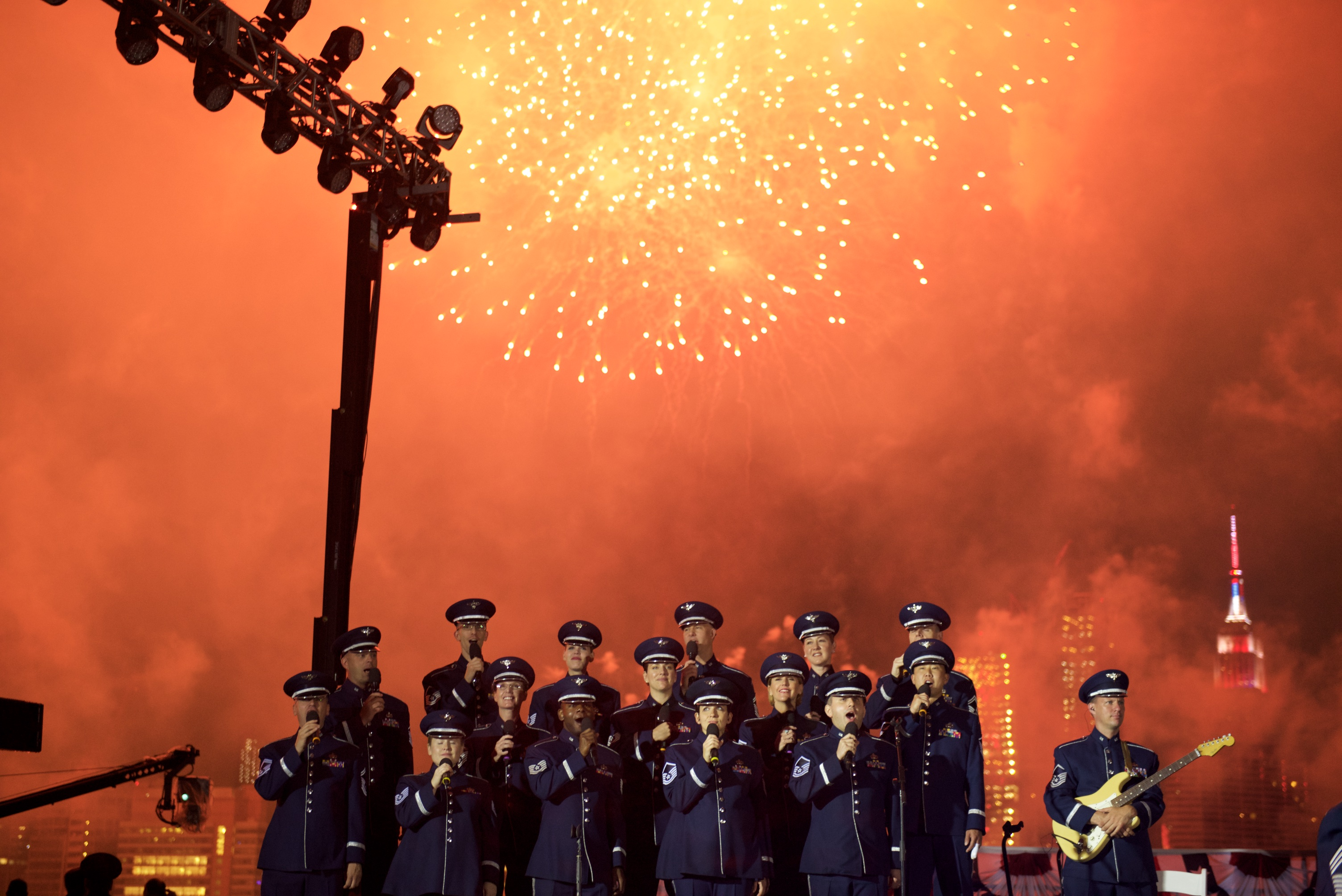
Performance by United States Air Force for 2016 broadcast on NBC

The fireworks show was first televised by WPIX beginning in 1983; the first broadcast had the highest viewership among all television shows that evening (including network programming) and received a 12.6 rating and a 28% share. The special was first syndicated nationwide by WPIX in 1991. The special moved to NBC in 2000, where it has been broadcast ever since.

In recent years, the fireworks were preceded by celebrity appearances and live performances. Past performers have included Beyoncé, Jennifer Lopez, Justin Timberlake, and Katy Perry. The 2024 show featured Lainey Wilson, Luis Fonsi, Tanner Adell, Bell Biv DeVoe, Shaboozey and The War and Treaty. The 2024 broadcast drew in 7.6 million viewers on NBC and Peacock.

Traditionally, NBC has aired an abbreviated encore of the telecast in the 10:00 p.m. ET/PT hour following the live two-hour broadcast. NBC has stated that this is done for budgetary reasons, although for a period this encore also counterprogrammed a competing Boston Pops fireworks special that had been aired live in the hour by CBS from 2002 to 2013.

On February 25, 2025, NBC announced that it had renewed its rights to the fireworks through 2035, as part of a deal that also renews its rights to the Macy's Thanksgiving Day Parade, and also includes rights to a new, upcoming Macy's-sponsored event.
