= George H. Barlow =

American judge (1921–1979)

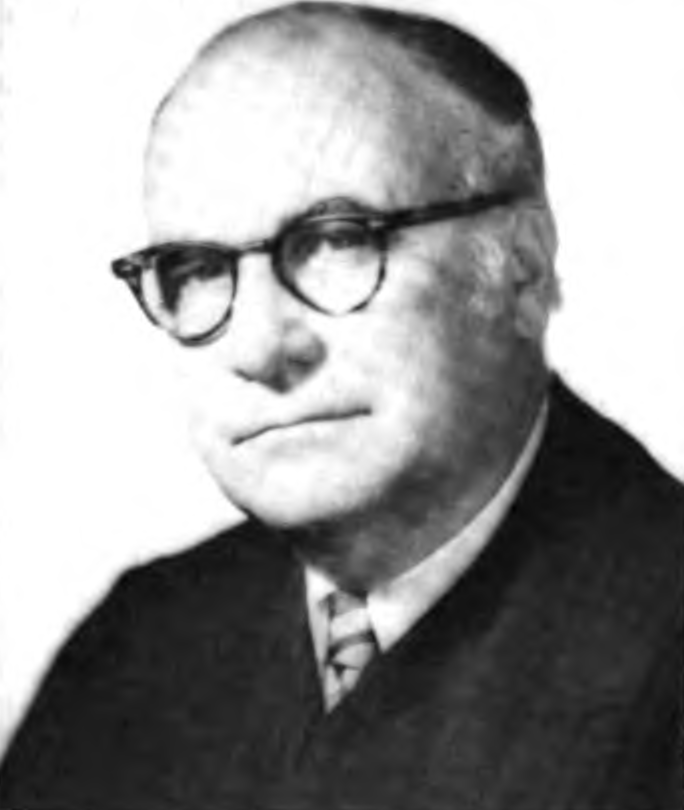

Chief Judge of the United States District Court for the District of New Jersey
- In office 1978–1979
- Preceded by: Lawrence Aloysius Whipple
- Succeeded by: Clarkson Sherman Fisher

Judge of the United States District Court for the District of New Jersey
- In office December 18, 1969 – March 4, 1979
- Appointed by: Richard Nixon
- Preceded by: Arthur Stephen Lane
- Succeeded by: Harold A. Ackerman

Personal details
- Born: George Herbert Barlow; January 4, 1921 Trenton, New Jersey, U.S.
- Died: March 4, 1979 (aged 58) Trenton, New Jersey, U.S.
- Education: Dartmouth College (B.A.); Rutgers Law School (LL.B.)

George Herbert Barlow (January 4, 1921 – March 4, 1979) was a United States district judge of the United States District Court for the District of New Jersey.

== Education and career ==
Born in Trenton, New Jersey, Barlow received a Bachelor of Arts degree from Dartmouth College in 1943 and a Bachelor of Laws from Rutgers Law School in 1948. He was in the United States Navy from 1943 to 1945. He was an assistant counsel for the New Jersey State Law Revision Commission from 1948 to 1953. He was in private practice in Trenton from 1948 to 1953. He was an Assistant United States Attorney of the District of New Jersey from 1953 to 1956 and then a United States Commissioner of the United States District Court for the District of New Jersey from 1956 to 1963. He then returned to private practice until 1963. He was a judge on the Mercer County Court, New Jersey from 1963 to 1966, and on the Superior Court of New Jersey from 1966 to 1970.

== Federal judicial service ==
On July 22, 1969, Barlow was nominated by President Richard Nixon to a seat on the United States District Court for the District of New Jersey vacated by Judge Arthur Stephen Lane. Barlow was confirmed by the United States Senate on December 17, 1969, and received his commission the following day. He served as Chief Judge from 1978 until his death of an apparent heart attack on March 4, 1979, at the Mercer Medical Center in Trenton.

== Sources ==
Legal offices
Preceded by Arthur Stephen Lane	Judge of the United States District Court for the District of New Jersey; 1969–1979	Succeeded by Harold A. Ackerman
Preceded by Lawrence Aloysius Whipple	Chief Judge of the United States District Court for the District of New Jersey; 1978–1979	Succeeded by Clarkson Sherman Fisher
