= Liberty Fanfare =

Composition for orchestra by John Williams

Liberty Fanfare is a composition for orchestra by John Williams. Written in 1986, the piece was commissioned to celebrate the Centennial of the Statue of Liberty on July 4, that year. However, it was actually premiered a month beforehand, on June 4, when Williams conducted the Boston Pops. The entire piece is approximately five minutes in length. It uses both the brass section for the main themes and the strings for providing a recurring, melodious motif. The rhythm is also repeated several times throughout the piece.

Before the premiere of the piece, Williams commented that he had "tried to create a group of American airs and tunes of my own invention that I hope will give some sense of the event and the occasion". The composition received generally positive reviews at the time and is still regularly performed as a patriotic piece. Several recordings of the piece are also available.

== Partial discography ==
- 1987: By Request...The Best of John Williams & the Boston Pops Orchestra, John Williams and the Boston Pops Orchestra – Philips Records
- 1988: American Jubilee, Erich Kunzel and the Cincinnati Pops Orchestra – Telarc Records
- 1990: The Best of John Williams, the Philharmonic Rock Orchestra – Naxos Records
- 1998: Victory at Sea (arranged for concert band), the United States Navy Band – Altissimo! Records
- 1999: Splash of Pops, Keith Lockhart and the Boston Pops Orchestra – RCA Records
- 2026: John Williams and "The President's Own" (live), the United States Marine Band – Naxos Records
