= Bill Martini =

American judge (born 1947)

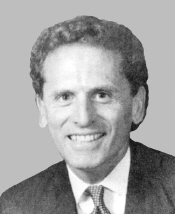

Senior Judge of the United States District Court for the District of New Jersey
- Incumbent
- Assumed office February 10, 2015

Judge of the United States District Court for the District of New Jersey
- In office November 19, 2002 – February 10, 2015
- Appointed by: George W. Bush
- Preceded by: John C. Lifland
- Succeeded by: Julien Neals

Member of the U.S. House of Representatives from New Jersey's 8th district
- In office January 3, 1995 – January 3, 1997
- Preceded by: Herb Klein
- Succeeded by: Bill Pascrell

Personal details
- Born: William John Martini; February 10, 1947 (age 79) Passaic, New Jersey, U.S.
- Party: Republican
- Education: Villanova University (BA); Rutgers University, Newark (JD)

William John Martini (born February 10, 1947) is a senior United States district judge of the United States District Court for the District of New Jersey, having been in active service from November 14, 2002, to February 10, 2015. Martini is one of 24 judges seated on the New Jersey District Court, and his highest profile case to date was the corruption trial for former Newark Mayor Sharpe James.

Before his judicial service, Martini was a Republican Party politician who represented New Jersey's 8th congressional district in the House of Representatives, where he served from January 3, 1995 to January 3, 1997.

== Early life and career ==
Martini was born in Passaic, New Jersey. He graduated from Passaic High School. He received a Bachelor of Arts degree from Villanova University in Philadelphia, and received his Juris Doctor from Rutgers School of Law—Newark in 1972. Martini clerked for the Hon. Joseph P. Hanrahan, on the Superior Court of New Jersey, from 1972 to 1973.

Martini then worked as an assistant in the Hudson County prosecutor's office in 1973. The following year, he was named an assistant United States attorney in the U.S. Attorney's Office for the District of New Jersey, and served in that post until 1977. He went into private practice after that.

Martini would eventually land in Passaic County again, and won election to the city council in Clifton, New Jersey in 1990. He would add a position on the Passaic County Board of Chosen Freeholders in 1992.

In 1994, the Republican Party nominated Martini for Congress in New Jersey's 8th congressional district. He faced off against one-term incumbent Herbert Klein, who had fallen out of favor with the voters. That, and the wave of the 1994 Republican Revolution, helped Martini defeat Klein and flip one of the 54 seats in the House of Representatives the Republicans gained that year. In addition, he was the first Republican to win an election in the district since Gordon Canfield won his last re-election bid in 1958.

Two years later, Martini was defeated for re-election in 1996 by Paterson mayor Bill Pascrell in his final run for political office. This made him one of eight Republican Representatives elected in the 1994 Republican Revolution to be defeated in their re-election bids.

In 1999, the Governor Christine Todd Whitman named Martini to the Board of Commissioners of the Port Authority of New York and New Jersey, a post in which he served for three years.

=== Federal judicial service ===
On January 23, 2002, Martini was nominated for a judgeship of the United States District Court of New Jersey by President George W. Bush, was confirmed on November 14, 2002 and received his commission on November 19, 2002. He assumed senior status on February 10, 2015.

=== Sharpe James case ===
Martini sentenced Sharpe James, former mayor of Newark, to 27 months in prison for corruption. State and federal prosecutors wanted the maximum allowable sentence of 15 to 20 years although federal guidelines would only allow a 5 to 12 year potential sentence. Martini said that James' years as a public servant played a role in his decision, but would not discuss the case further. U.S. Attorney Chris Christie announced that he would appeal Martini's sentence.

=== Hassan v. City of New York ===
In February 2014, Martini dismissed a federal lawsuit brought by eight New Jersey Muslims alleging they were unlawfully targeted for surveillance by the New York Police Department because of their religion. The suit accused the NYPD of spying on Muslims in mosques, restaurants and schools. In his decision. Martini wrote "The more likely explanation for the surveillance was to locate budding terrorist conspiracies."

Baher Azmy, Legal Director at the Center for Constitutional Rights (which served as co-counsel in the case) responded to Judge Martini's ruling: "In addition to willfully ignoring the harm that our innocent clients suffered from the NYPD's illegal spying program, by upholding the NYPD's blunderbuss Muslim surveillance practices, the court's decision gives legal sanction to the targeted discrimination of Muslims anywhere and everywhere in this country, without limitation, for no other reason than their religion." The plaintiffs appealed the dismissal of their case, and numerous organizations filed amicus curiae briefs. The Court of Appeals reversed Martini's decision and remanded the case in October 2015. It was eventually settled in April 2018.

== Electoral history ==
New Jersey's 8th congressional district: Results 1994–1996
Year	Democrat	Votes	Pct	Republican	Votes	Pct	3rd Party	Party	Votes	Pct
1994	Herb Klein	68,661	49%	William J. Martini	70,494	50%	Bernard George	Conservative	2,213	2%
1996	William J. Pascrell Jr.	98,861	51%	William J. Martini	92,609	48%	Jeffrey M. Levine	Independent	1,621	1%

U.S. House of Representatives
Preceded by Herb Klein	Member of the U.S. House of Representatives from New Jersey's 8th congressional district 1995–1997	Succeeded by Bill Pascrell
Legal offices
Preceded by John C. Lifland	Judge of the United States District Court for the District of New Jersey; 2002–2015	Succeeded by Julien Neals
U.S. order of precedence (ceremonial)
Preceded by Mark Critz as Former U.S. Representative	Order of precedence of the United States as Former U.S. Representative	Succeeded by Michael J. Pappas as Former U.S. Representative
