= Harold A. Ackerman =

American judge (1928–2009)

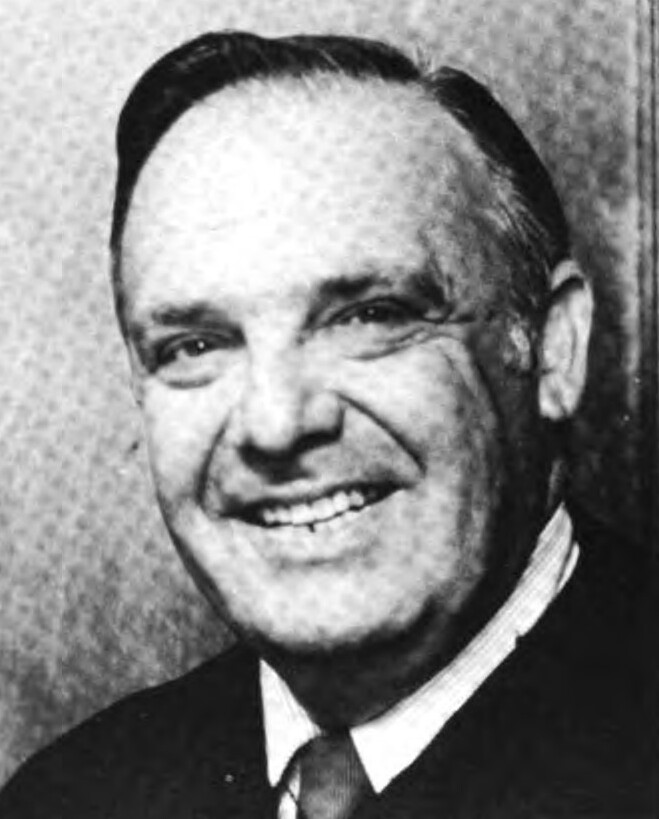

Senior Judge of the United States District Court for the District of New Jersey
- In office February 15, 1994 – December 2, 2009

Judge of the United States District Court for the District of New Jersey
- In office November 2, 1979 – February 15, 1994
- Appointed by: Jimmy Carter
- Preceded by: George H. Barlow
- Succeeded by: William H. Walls

Personal details
- Born: Harold Arnold Ackerman; February 15, 1928 Newark, New Jersey, U.S.
- Died: December 2, 2009 (aged 81) West Orange, New Jersey, U.S.
- Education: Rutgers Law School (LLB)

Harold Arnold Ackerman (February 15, 1928 – December 2, 2009) was a United States district judge of the United States District Court for the District of New Jersey.

== Education and career ==
Ackerman was born in Newark, New Jersey and raised in nearby Irvington, where he graduated from Irvington High School before earning his undergraduate degree at Seton Hall University. He received a Bachelor of Laws from Rutgers Law School in 1951. He engaged in the private practice of law in New Jersey from 1951 to 1954. From 1955 to 1979, he was a judge on various New Jersey courts - on the Compensation Court of the State of New Jersey (1955–1965); the Union County District Court (to 1970); the Union County Court until (to 1973); the Superior Court, Law Division (to 1975); and the Superior Court, Chancery Division, General Equity (to 1979).

== Federal judicial service ==
On September 28, 1979, Ackerman was nominated by President Jimmy Carter to a seat on the United States District Court for the District of New Jersey, vacated by Judge George H. Barlow. He was confirmed by the United States Senate on October 31, 1979, and received his commission on November 2, 1979. He assumed senior status on February 15, 1994, serving in that capacity until his death on December 2, 2009, at his home in West Orange, New Jersey.

== See also ==
- List of Jewish American jurists

== Sources ==
Legal offices
Preceded by George H. Barlow	Judge of the United States District Court for the District of New Jersey; 1979–1994	Succeeded by William H. Walls
