= Clarkson Sherman Fisher =

American judge (1921–1997)

Senior Judge of the United States District Court for the District of New Jersey
- In office October 1, 1987 – July 27, 1997

Chief Judge of the United States District Court for the District of New Jersey
- In office 1979–1987
- Preceded by: George H. Barlow
- Succeeded by: John F. Gerry

Judge of the United States District Court for the District of New Jersey
- In office October 16, 1970 – October 1, 1987
- Appointed by: Richard Nixon
- Preceded by: Reynier Jacob Wortendyke Jr.
- Succeeded by: John C. Lifland

Personal details
- Born: Clarkson Sherman Fisher; July 8, 1921 Long Branch, New Jersey, U.S.
- Died: July 27, 1997 (aged 76) Princeton, New Jersey, U.S.
- Education: Notre Dame Law School (LL.B.)

Clarkson Sherman Fisher (July 8, 1921 – July 27, 1997) was a United States district judge of the United States District Court for the District of New Jersey.

== Education and career ==
Born in Long Branch, New Jersey, Fisher was a sergeant in the United States Army during World War II, from 1942 to 1945, and was a reserve sergeant from 1946 to 1949. He received a Bachelor of Laws from the Notre Dame Law School in 1950. He entered private practice in Long Branch from 1951 to 1964. He was a councilman in West Long Branch, New Jersey from 1959 to 1964, serving as a member of the New Jersey General Assembly in 1964. He was a judge of the Monmouth County Court in New Jersey from 1964 to 1966, and of the Superior Court of New Jersey from 1966 to 1970.

== Federal judicial service ==
On October 7, 1970, Fisher was nominated by President Richard Nixon to a seat on the United States District Court for the District of New Jersey vacated by Judge Reynier Jacob Wortendyke Jr. Fisher was confirmed by the United States Senate on October 13, 1970, and received his commission on October 16, 1970. He served as Chief Judge from 1979 to 1987, assuming senior status on October 1, 1987. He served in that capacity until his death on July 27, 1997, in Princeton, New Jersey.

== Family ==
Fisher's son, Clarkson S. Fisher Jr., also is a judge, having served on the Superior Court of New Jersey since 1993, and on that court's Appellate Division since 2003.

== Honor ==
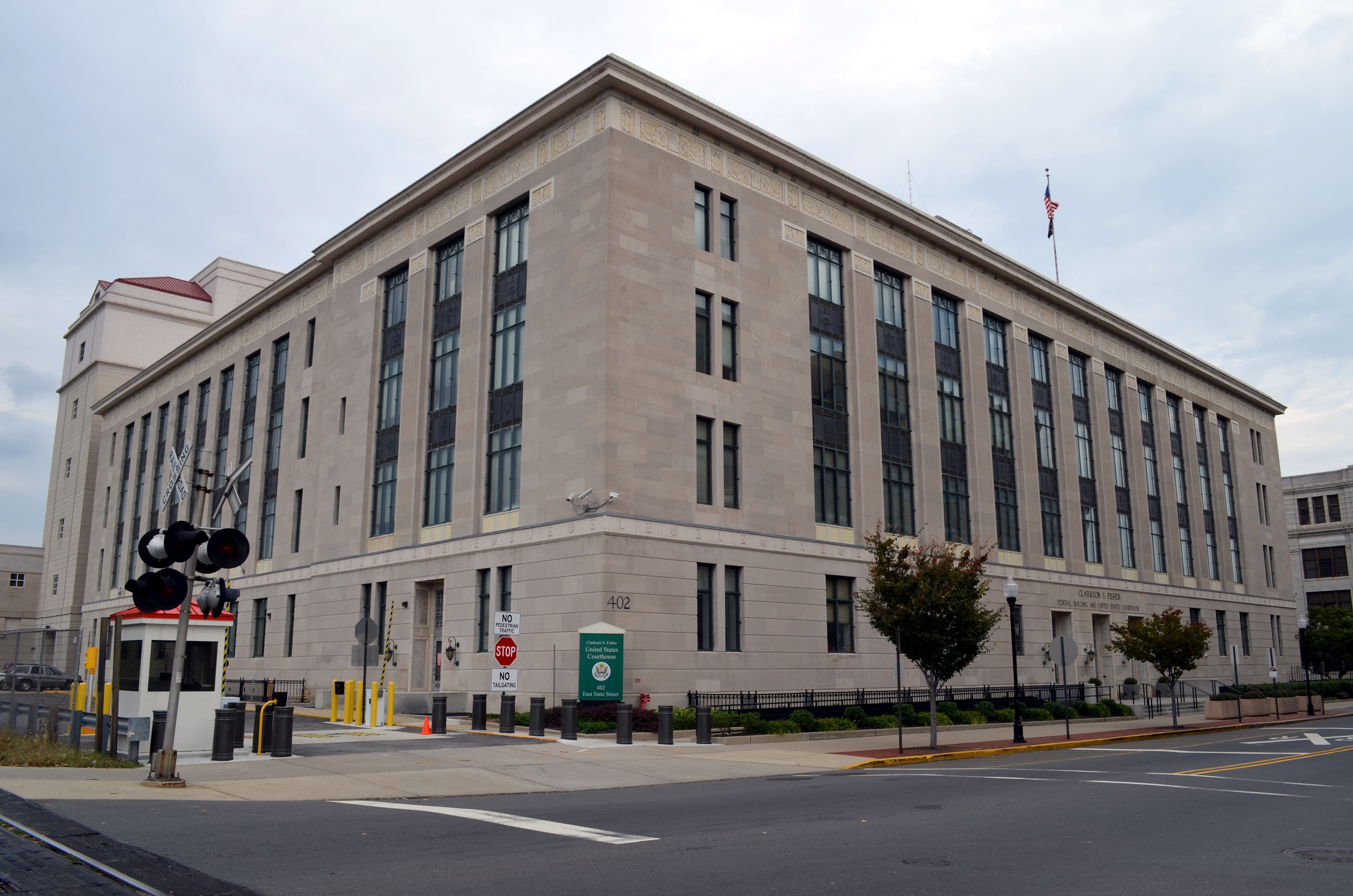
The courthouse-federal building in Trenton was designated in 1993.

The Clarkson S. Fisher Federal Building and United States Courthouse in Trenton, New Jersey is named in his honor.

== Sources ==
Legal offices
Preceded by Reynier Jacob Wortendyke Jr.	Judge of the United States District Court for the District of New Jersey; 1970–1987	Succeeded by John C. Lifland
Preceded by George H. Barlow	Chief Judge of the United States District Court for the District of New Jersey; 1979–1987	Succeeded by John F. Gerry
