= Reynier Jacob Wortendyke Jr. =

American judge (1895–1975)

Senior Judge of the United States District Court for the District of New Jersey
- In office June 1, 1970 – December 26, 1975

Judge of the United States District Court for the District of New Jersey
- In office June 8, 1955 – June 1, 1970
- Appointed by: Dwight D. Eisenhower
- Preceded by: Seat established by 68 Stat. 8
- Succeeded by: Clarkson Sherman Fisher

Personal details
- Born: Reynier Jacob Wortendyke Jr. March 22, 1895 Jersey City, New Jersey
- Died: December 26, 1975 (aged 80)
- Education: Princeton University (A.B.); Columbia Law School (LL.B.)

Reynier Jacob Wortendyke Jr. (March 22, 1895 – December 26, 1975) was a United States district judge of the United States District Court for the District of New Jersey.

== Education and career ==
Born in Jersey City, New Jersey, Wortendyke received an Artium Baccalaureus degree from Princeton University in 1916 and a Bachelor of Laws from Columbia Law School in 1922. He was township attorney of Millburn Township, New Jersey from 1930 to 1931 and from 1933 to 1935, and was in private practice in New Jersey from 1934 to 1952.

== Federal judicial service ==
On April 18, 1955, Wortendyke was nominated by President Dwight D. Eisenhower to a new seat on the United States District Court for the District of New Jersey created by 68 Stat. 8. He was confirmed by the United States Senate on June 7, 1955, and received his commission the next day. He assumed senior status on June 1, 1970, and served in that capacity until his death on December 26, 1975.

== Sources ==
Legal offices
Preceded by Seat established by 68 Stat. 8	Judge of the United States District Court for the District of New Jersey; 1955–1970	Succeeded by Clarkson Sherman Fisher
