= Thomas Glynn Walker =

American judge (1899–1933)

Judge of the United States District Court for the District of New Jersey
- In office December 20, 1939 – December 31, 1941
- Appointed by: Franklin D. Roosevelt
- Preceded by: William Clark
- Succeeded by: Thomas Francis Meaney

Personal details
- Born: Thomas Glynn Walker; December 9, 1899 New Jersey, U.S.
- Died: November 4, 1993 (aged 93) New Vernon, New Jersey, U.S.
- Education: Fordham University School of Law (LL.B.)

Thomas Glynn Walker (December 9, 1899 – November 4, 1993) was a New Jersey attorney and state judge and a United States district judge of the United States District Court for the District of New Jersey.

== Education and career ==
Born on December 9, 1899, in New Jersey, Walker received a Bachelor of Laws from Fordham University School of Law in 1924. He was in private practice in Newark, New Jersey from 1924 to 1937. He was a professor at Mercer Beasley School of Law (now Rutgers Law School) in Newark from 1930 to 1935. He was a member of the New Jersey General Assembly from 1933 to 1938, and was Speaker from 1937 to 1938. He was a Judge of the New Jersey Court of Errors and Appeals in Trenton from 1937 to 1939. He was a Judge of the New Jersey Court of Common Pleas for Hudson County in Jersey City in 1939.

== Federal judicial service ==
Walker received a recess appointment from President Franklin D. Roosevelt on December 20, 1939, to a seat on the United States District Court for the District of New Jersey vacated by Judge William Clark. He was nominated to the same position by President Roosevelt on January 16, 1940. He was confirmed by the United States Senate on March 5, 1940, and received his commission on March 13, 1940. His service terminated on December 31, 1941, due to his resignation.

== Post judicial service and death ==
Walker was vice president and general counsel of New Jersey Bell Telephone Company in Newark from 1942 to 1965. He was in private practice in Newark from 1965 to 1970. He died on November 4, 1993, in New Vernon, New Jersey.

== Sources ==
Legal offices
Preceded by William Clark	Judge of the United States District Court for the District of New Jersey; 1939–1941	Succeeded by Thomas Francis Meaney
