= Katharine Sweeney Hayden =

American judge (born 1942)

Senior Judge of the United States District Court for the District of New Jersey
- Incumbent
- Assumed office May 30, 2010

Judge of the United States District Court for the District of New Jersey
- In office September 29, 1997 – May 30, 2010
- Appointed by: Bill Clinton
- Preceded by: H. Lee Sarokin
- Succeeded by: Esther Salas

Personal details
- Born: Katharine M. Jackson; May 30, 1942 (age 83) New York City, New York, U.S.
- Children: 2, including Matt
- Education: Marymount Manhattan College (BA); Seton Hall University (MA, JD)

Katharine M. Sweeney Hayden (née Jackson; born May 30, 1942) is an American attorney and jurist serving as Senior United States district judge of the United States District Court for the District of New Jersey.

== Early life and education ==
Born in New York City, Hayden earned a Bachelor of Arts degree from Marymount Manhattan College in 1963, a Master of Arts from Seton Hall University in 1971, and a Juris Doctor from Seton Hall University School of Law in 1975.

== Career ==
She was a law clerk for Judge Robert L. Clifford of the New Jersey Supreme Court from 1975-76. After her clerkship she became an Assistant United States Attorney at the United States Attorney's Office for the District of New Jersey from 1976-78. She was in private matrimonial law practice in New Jersey from 1978–91, and then became a judge for the New Jersey Superior Court (Family Division) from 1991-97.

=== Federal judicial service ===
Hayden was nominated by President Bill Clinton on May 6, 1997, to a seat on the United States District Court for the District of New Jersey vacated by H. Lee Sarokin. She was confirmed by the United States Senate on September 25, 1997, and received her commission four days later. Hayden assumed senior status on May 30, 2010.

Hayden continues her connection to her alma mater, Seton Hall University School of Law, serving as an adjunct professor teaching course on Persuasion & Advocacy and Sentencing, and frequently employing Seton Hall Law students as judicial clerks and interns.

== Personal life ==
Hayden is married to Joseph A. Hayden, Jr., a criminal defense attorney and partner at the New Jersey law firm of Pashman Stein Walder Hayden. She has two sons, one of whom is Matt Sweeney, a musician and founding member of the band Chavez.

== Notable former clerks ==
- J. Brendan Day, United States Magistrate Judge for the United States District Court for the District of New Jersey.
- Matthew Fedor, Judge of the New Jersey Superior Court.

== Sources ==
Legal offices
Preceded by H. Lee Sarokin	Judge of the United States District Court for the District of New Jersey; 1997–2010	Succeeded by Esther Salas
