= Arthur Stephen Lane =

United States federal judge

Judge of the United States District Court for the District of New Jersey
- In office August 30, 1960 – July 15, 1967
- Appointed by: Dwight D. Eisenhower
- Preceded by: Phillip Forman
- Succeeded by: George H. Barlow

Personal details
- Born: Arthur Stephen Lane; December 26, 1910 Arlington, Massachusetts, U.S.
- Died: October 23, 1997 (aged 86) Princeton, New Jersey, U.S.
- Education: Princeton University (BA); Harvard University (LLB)

Arthur Stephen Lane (December 26, 1910 – October 23, 1997) was a United States district judge of the United States District Court for the District of New Jersey.

== Education and career ==
Born in Arlington, Massachusetts, Lane received a Bachelor of Arts degree from Princeton University in 1934. He received the Moses Taylor Pyne Honor Prize, Princeton's highest undergraduate honor. He received a Bachelor of Laws from Harvard Law School in 1937. He was law secretary to New Jersey Vice Chancellor from 1937 to 1939. He was in the United States Navy as a Commanding Officer from 1942 to 1946. He was an assistant prosecutor for Mercer County, New Jersey from 1946 to 1956. He was in private practice of law in Trenton, New Jersey from 1946 to 1956. He was a Judge of the Mercer County Court from 1956 to 1960.

== Political run ==
Lane was the Republican nominee for New Jersey Senate in 1953, but lost to Democrat Sido L. Ridolfi; Lane and Ridolfi had attended Princeton and Harvard Law at the same time.

== Federal judicial service ==
Lane was nominated by President Dwight D. Eisenhower on June 17, 1960, to a seat on the United States District Court for the District of New Jersey vacated by Judge Phillip Forman. He was confirmed by the United States Senate on August 27, 1960, and received his commission on August 30, 1960. His service was terminated on July 15, 1967, due to his resignation.

== Post judicial service ==
Lane was General Counsel and Director of Johnson and Johnson in New Brunswick, New Jersey from 1967 to 1976. He was in private practice in New Brunswick from 1976 to 1997. He was a member of the New Jersey State Commission of Investigation from 1977 to 1985. He died on October 23, 1997, in Princeton, New Jersey.

== Sources ==
Legal offices
Preceded by Phillip Forman	Judge of the United States District Court for the District of New Jersey; 1960–1967	Succeeded by George H. Barlow
