= Julien Neals =

American judge (born 1965)

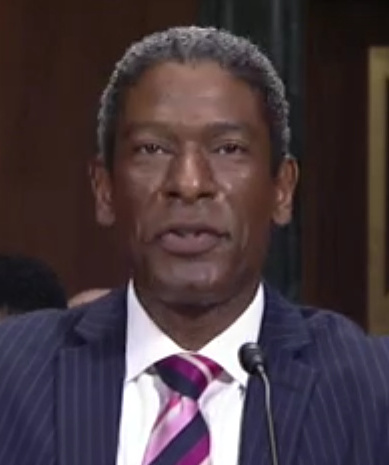

Judge of the United States District Court for the District of New Jersey
- Incumbent
- Assumed office June 22, 2021
- Appointed by: Joe Biden
- Preceded by: Bill Martini

Personal details
- Born: 1965 (age 60–61) Newark, New Jersey, U.S.
- Education: Morehouse College (BA); Emory University (JD)

Julien Xavier Neals (born 1965) is an American lawyer serving as a United States district judge of the United States District Court for the District of New Jersey.

== Education ==
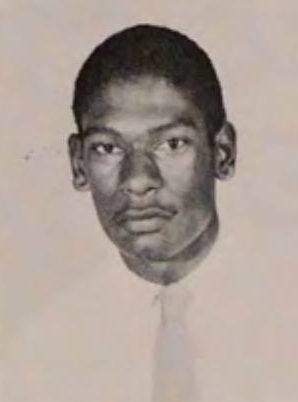
Neals in the Morehouse College yearbook, 1983

Neals attended high school at Seton Hall Preparatory School. He then received a Bachelor of Arts from Morehouse College in 1986. He received a Juris Doctor from Emory University School of Law in 1991.

== Career ==
He began his legal career as a law clerk to Judge Seymour Margulies of the New Jersey Superior Court in Hudson County from 1991 to 1992. From 1992 to 2006 and in 2014, he worked at Chasan, Leyner & Lamparello, P.C., in Secaucus, New Jersey, first as an associate, and later as a partner, where he practiced general litigation in state and federal courts. From 2006 to 2014, he worked for the City of Newark, as Chief Judge of the Newark Municipal Court from 2006 to 2008, as Corporation Counsel from 2008 to 2010, and as Business Administrator from 2010 to 2014. From January 2015 until his confirmation, he served as County Counsel for Bergen County.

== Federal judicial service ==
=== Expired nomination to district court under Obama ===
On February 26, 2015, President Barack Obama nominated Neals to serve as a United States District Judge of the United States District Court for the District of New Jersey, to the seat vacated by Judge Faith S. Hochberg, who retired on March 6, 2015. He received a hearing before the Judiciary Committee on September 30, 2015. On November 5, 2015, his nomination was favorably reported out of committee by voice vote. However, Senate Majority Leader Mitch McConnell refused to schedule the nomination for a Senate vote. The nomination expired on January 3, 2017, with the end of the 114th Congress.

=== Renomination to district court under Biden ===
On March 30, 2021, President Joe Biden announced his intent to renominate Neals to serve as a United States district judge for the United States District Court for the District of New Jersey. On April 19, 2021, his nomination was sent to the Senate. President Biden nominated Neals to the seat vacated by Judge Bill Martini, who assumed senior status on February 10, 2015. Neals was recommended by Senator Cory Booker. On April 28, 2021, a hearing on his nomination was held before the Senate Judiciary Committee. On May 20, 2021, his nomination was reported out of committee by a 16–6 vote. On June 7, 2021, the United States Senate invoked cloture on Neals' nomination by a 66–28 vote. On June 8, 2021, his nomination was confirmed by a 66–33 vote. He received his judicial commission on June 22, 2021.

=== Controversy over hallucinated quotations and case outcomes ===
On June 30, 2025, Neals issued an opinion containing made-up quotes and incorrect case outcomes, which Reason described as hallucinations indicative of the use of generative AI. After a party pointed out the errors, Neals withdrew the opinion.

== See also ==
- List of African-American federal judges
- List of African-American jurists

Legal offices
Preceded by Bill Martini	Judge of the United States District Court for the District of New Jersey; 2021–present	Incumbent
