= Lawrence Aloysius Whipple =

American judge (1910–1983)

Senior Judge of the United States District Court for the District of New Jersey
- In office September 1, 1978 – June 8, 1983

Chief Judge of the United States District Court for the District of New Jersey
- In office 1974–1978
- Preceded by: Mitchell Harry Cohen
- Succeeded by: George H. Barlow

Judge of the United States District Court for the District of New Jersey
- In office October 12, 1967 – September 1, 1978
- Appointed by: Lyndon B. Johnson
- Preceded by: Thomas Francis Meaney
- Succeeded by: H. Lee Sarokin

Magistrate Judge of the United States District Court for the District of New Jersey
- Acting
- In office 1949–1951

Personal details
- Born: July 26, 1910 New York City, New York, U.S.
- Died: June 8, 1983 (aged 72) Red Bank, New Jersey, U.S.
- Education: Columbia University (BS); Seton Hall University (LLB)

Lawrence Aloysius Whipple (July 26, 1910 – June 8, 1983) was a United States district judge of the United States District Court for the District of New Jersey.

== Education and career ==
Born in New York City, Whipple received a Bachelor of Science degree from Columbia University in 1933 and a Bachelor of Laws from John Marshall Law School (now Seton Hall University School of Law) in 1939. He was in private practice from 1939 to 1949. He was an acting United States magistrate judge for the United States District Court for the District of New Jersey from 1949 to 1951. He was Director of Law Enforcement for the Office of Public Safety in 1950. He was a special assistant United States attorney of the United States Department of Justice in 1951. He was executive director of the Jersey City Housing Authority in New Jersey in 1953. He was director of public safety for Jersey City, New Jersey from 1953 to 1957. He was director of the Department of Revenue and Finance for Jersey City in 1957. He was county counsel for Hudson County, New Jersey from 1957 to 1958. He was the deputy attorney general of New Jersey in 1958. He was a prosecutor in Hudson County from 1958 to 1962. He was a judge of the Superior Court of New Jersey from 1963 to 1967.

=== Federal judicial service ===
Whipple was nominated by President Lyndon B. Johnson on August 25, 1967, to a seat on the United States District Court for the District of New Jersey vacated by Judge Thomas Francis Meaney. He was confirmed by the United States Senate on October 12, 1967, and received his commission the same day. He served as Chief Judge from 1974 to 1978 and was a member of the Judicial Conference of the United States from 1975 to 1978. He assumed senior status on September 1, 1978, due to a certified disability, and continued in that capacity until his death.

== Personal life ==
A resident of Sea Girt, New Jersey, Whipple died in nearby Red Bank, due to complications relating to heart surgery.

== Sources ==
Legal offices
Preceded by Thomas Francis Meaney	Judge of the United States District Court for the District of New Jersey; 1967–1978	Succeeded by H. Lee Sarokin
Preceded by Mitchell Harry Cohen	Chief Judge of the United States District Court for the District of New Jersey; 1974–1978	Succeeded by George H. Barlow
