= H. Lee Sarokin =

American judge (1928–2023)

Judge of the United States Court of Appeals for the Third Circuit
- In office October 5, 1994 – July 31, 1996
- Appointed by: Bill Clinton
- Preceded by: Seat established by 104 Stat. 5089
- Succeeded by: Maryanne Trump Barry

Judge of the United States District Court for the District of New Jersey
- In office November 2, 1979 – October 5, 1994
- Appointed by: Jimmy Carter
- Preceded by: Lawrence Aloysius Whipple
- Succeeded by: Katharine Sweeney Hayden

Personal details
- Born: Haddon Lee Sarokin; November 25, 1928 Perth Amboy, New Jersey, U.S.
- Died: June 20, 2023 (aged 94) La Jolla, California, U.S.
- Education: Dartmouth College (AB); Harvard University (LLB)

Haddon Lee Sarokin (November 25, 1928 – June 20, 2023) was a United States circuit judge of the United States Court of Appeals for the Third Circuit and a former United States District Judge of the United States District Court for the District of New Jersey. After retiring as a judge, he became a blogger, often writing in support of those he saw as wrongly convicted.

== Early life and career ==
Sarokin was born in Perth Amboy, New Jersey, and raised in Maplewood, New Jersey. He was the son of a newspaperman who named him after Haddon Ivins, who had been the editor of the Hudson Dispatch. "It's a dreadful name, which I dropped," Sarokin told the New York Times in 1985. Sarokin earned an Artium Baccalaureus degree from Dartmouth College in 1950 and a Bachelor of Laws from Harvard Law School in 1953. Sarokin worked in private practice in Newark, New Jersey from 1955 until 1979. He also concurrently served as an assistant counsel for Union County, New Jersey, from 1959 until 1965.

=== Federal judicial service ===
==== District court service ====
In 1978, Sarokin worked as the finance chairman for his friend Bill Bradley, who was running for a United States Senate seat to represent New Jersey. After Bradley won, he recommended Sarokin for a federal judgeship. On September 28, 1979, President Jimmy Carter nominated Sarokin to a seat on the United States District Court for the District of New Jersey that had been vacated by Lawrence Aloysius Whipple. The Senate confirmed Sarokin on October 31, 1979. He received his commission on November 2, 1979. His service terminated on October 5, 1994, due to elevation to the Third Circuit.

In 1985, Sarokin overturned the 1966 triple murder conviction of former middleweight boxer Rubin Carter resulting in Carter's release and a granting of a writ of habeas corpus to the former middleweight boxer. Sarokin had ruled that Carter had not received a fair trial as the prosecution had been based on 'racism rather than reason' and 'concealment rather than disclosure'. The case was ultimately appealed to the Supreme Court which declined to hear it and upheld Sarokin's ruling.

In 1988, Sarokin presided over a landmark cigarette liability lawsuit that resulted in a $400,000 award to the estate of Rose Cipollone, who died in 1984 after smoking for 40 years. It was the first cash award ever in a case involving a death from smoking. The decision was reversed on appeal and Sarokin removed from the case by the appellate court who concluded that "his words suggested a bias against tobacco makers", which Sarokin denied. In 1991, Sarokin ruled that a homeless man could not be barred from a public library in Morristown, New Jersey just because of his odor. The decision was overturned on appeal.

==== Court of appeals service ====
On May 5, 1994, President Bill Clinton nominated Sarokin to a newly created seat on the United States Court of Appeals for the Third Circuit. On October 4, 1994, the Senate voted 63–35 to confirm Sarokin to the seat on the Third Circuit. He received his commission on October 5, 1994. In early 1996, Sarokin sought to assume senior status, which means a reduced caseload. As part of shifting to senior status, Sarokin asked to move his chambers from New Jersey to California to be closer to his children. On April 24, 1996, an 11-member council of the Third Circuit denied Sarokin's request, citing federal guidelines relating to judicial office space.

In a speech in April 1996, presidential candidate Bob Dole cited Sarokin as one of four federal appellate and district judges that Clinton had appointed to the federal courts that Dole had deemed to be liberal activist judges. The others were Harold Baer Jr., Rosemary Barkett, and Leonie Brinkema. On June 5, 1996, Sarokin announced that he would retire outright from the Third Circuit, effective July 31, 1996. Sarokin cited his fear that his opinions from the bench might be used politically. "It is apparent that there are those who have decided to 'Willie Hortonize' the Federal judiciary, and that I am to be one of their prime targets," he wrote in a letter to President Clinton. "In the current political campaign, enforcement of constitutional rights is equated with being soft on crime and indeed, even causing it." In a separate letter to colleagues, Sarokin denied that his decision to retire had had anything to do with the court's decision not to allow him to move his chambers to California.

== Retirement and death ==
Just a few weeks before retiring from the bench, Sarokin purchased a house in Rancho Santa Fe, California, where he had chosen to live in retirement.

In retirement, Sarokin began to blog, serving as a regular contributor for the Huffington Post, opining on a myriad of issues and continuing to serve as an advocate for those he saw as wrongly convicted. Most prominently, he wrote a five-part series on the IRP6 and several follow up articles. Sarokin then made a case for IRP6's innocence in a July 2017 blog post, A Company Small Enough To Prosecute at The Huffington Post. His advocacy was heralded in a July 2016 article online at The Washington Post entitled, Judge who Freed ‘Hurricane’ Carter Now Helping Six Imprisoned Men, but Only Obama Can Save Them, where author, Tom Jackman, details the meticulous investigation and ground breaking conclusions of Judge Sarokin, who became convinced of the innocence of the IRP6. Judge Sarokin didn't stop at proclamations, he wrote a series on the Huffington Post Crime Blog about the IRP6 case, authored a play, called The Race Card Face Up, and ultimately a letter on behalf of the IRP6 to President Obama pushing for their clemency, something Sarokin stated he had never done in sixty years as a lawyer or judge. Sarokin died in La Jolla on June 20, 2023, at the age of 94, after suffering from pulmonary fibrosis and other ailments.

Legal offices
Preceded by Lawrence Aloysius Whipple	Judge of the United States District Court for the District of New Jersey; 1979–1994	Succeeded by Katharine Sweeney Hayden
Preceded by Seat established by 104 Stat. 5089	Judge of the United States Court of Appeals for the Third Circuit; 1994–1996	Succeeded by Maryanne Trump Barry
