= Pyro Spectaculars =

American pyrotechnics company

Pyro Spectaculars, Inc.
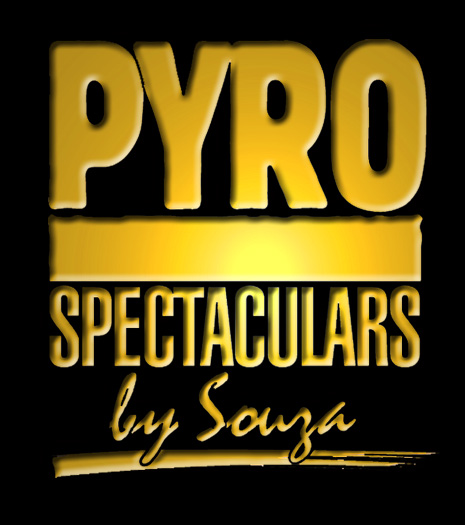
- Type: Private
- Founded: 1906 in San Francisco, California
- Founder: Manuel de Sousa
- Headquarters: Rialto, California, United States
- Key people: Jim Souza
- Products: Fireworks Entertainment Show Production; Souza Brand Fireworks
- Number of employees: 75
- Website: www.pyrospec.com

Pyro Spectaculars is an American pyrotechnics and fireworks company with its primary offices in Rialto, California. The company was officially founded in California in 1979 by Bob Souza, with his son Jim now the CEO. The company shoots hundreds of shows each year in multiple countries, including the largest fireworks show in the United States each year. The company also conducts a series of pyrotechnics classes and seminars to train licensed pyrotechnicians.

== Family history ==
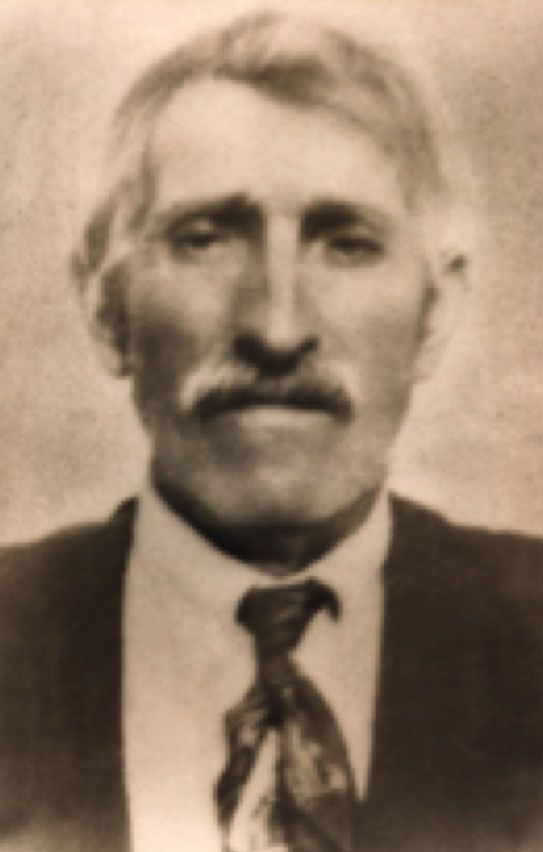
Manuel de Sousa

The Souza family (formerly de Sousa) has been involved in the fireworks industry since the first decade of the twentieth century when they immigrated from the Azores to the San Francisco Bay Area. The patriarch of the family, Manuel, began making his own fireworks out of his home and firing shows for local Portuguese community festivals. As his business began to grow, the entire family became involved in the production of fireworks, enabling him to pass his trade and "cookbook" down generationally.

Manuel's son, Alfred, was recruited by the U.S. Army when WWII broke out due to the chemistry and pyrotechnic skills he had gained in the family enterprise. After his release from the service, he began to produce and shoot local firework shows throughout California.

== Company formation ==
Alfred's son, Bob Souza, followed in his father's footsteps, eventually creating Pyro Spectaculars by Souza in 1979. Bob was a two-time President of the American Pyrotechnics Association and the recipient of its lifetime achievement award. His son, Jim Souza, took over as president and CEO in 1989.

Pyro Spectacular by Souza is one of the largest pyrotechnics companies in the world, producing shows for events like the Olympics, Super Bowl, World Cup, World Series, and Macy's Fourth of July Fireworks Spectacular. They also produce pyrotechnics and fireworks for cinema, music videos, and touring musical acts. The company produces pyrotechnics for hundreds of shows for smaller events as well, such as community events, graduations, and weddings, and maintains regional offices throughout the United States.

== Major shows by Pyro Spectaculars ==
Pyro Spectaculars is responsible for the annual Macy's 4th of July Fireworks Spectacular display in New York City, frequent shows at stadiums, and has been contracted by film crews to design shows for movies. The company's largest film contract was for the 1998 film Meet Joe Black, which made such an impression on star Brad Pitt that he later hired Pyro Spectaculars to produce a fireworks display for his wedding to Jennifer Aniston. Some of Pyro Spectaculars by Souza's other well-known shows include:

- Macy's 4th of July Fireworks (annually)
- 100th and 125th Anniversaries of the Statue of Liberty
- 1994 FIFA World Cup
- 1994 Pink Floyd Concert Tour
- 1996 Summer Olympics
- Opening and closing ceremonies of 2002 Salt Lake Winter Olympic Games
- 2004 Summer Olympics
- Rose Bowl's annual Americafest
- Several Super Bowls
- Disneyland and Disney World
- Six Flags chain of amusement parks
- Astroworld
- 50th Birthdays of Golden Gate and San Francisco–Oakland Bay Bridges
- President Ronald Reagan's inauguration in Washington
- Apocalypse Now, for which they received an OSCAR from National Academy of Arts and Sciences
- Seattle Space Needle New Year's Fireworks: 1992–present
- World Wrestling Entertainment Pyro: 2008–present

== Types of pyrotechnics ==
Pyro Spectaculars by Souza produces a variety of effects for different events. They create their own brand of fireworks—which are only shot at their shows—including a brand of HD fireworks designed with the camera in mind for television audiences. Their other effects include:

- High-level shells
- Low-level effects
- Rockets
- Fireballs
- Fire rings
- Confetti cannons
- Cryogenic effects
