= Thomas Francis Meaney =

American judge (1888–1968)

Senior Judge of the United States District Court for the District of New Jersey.
- In office May 1, 1966 – May 17, 1968

Judge of the United States District Court for the District of New Jersey.
- In office July 3, 1942 – May 1, 1966
- Appointed by: Franklin D. Roosevelt
- Preceded by: Thomas Glynn Walker
- Succeeded by: Lawrence Aloysius Whipple

Personal details
- Born: Thomas Francis Meaney; September 6, 1888 Jersey City, New Jersey, U.S.
- Died: May 17, 1968 (aged 79) Livingston, New Jersey, U.S.
- Education: Saint Peter's College (A.B., A.M.); Fordham University School of Law (LL.B.)

Thomas Francis Meaney (September 6, 1888 – May 17, 1968) was a United States district judge of the United States District Court for the District of New Jersey.

== Education and career ==
Born in Jersey City, New Jersey, Meaney received an Artium Baccalaureus degree from Saint Peter's College in 1908, an Artium Magister degree from the same institution in 1909, and a Bachelor of Laws from Fordham University School of Law in 1911. He was secretary to Mayor H. Otto Wittpenn of Jersey City from 1911 to 1913. He was in private practice in Jersey City from 1913 to 1917. He served in the United States Army from 1917 to 1919 and achieved the rank of first lieutenant. He was in private practice in Jersey City from 1919 to 1934. He was a Judge of the Hudson County Juvenile and Domestic Relations Court in New Jersey from 1923 to 1934. He was a Judge of the Hudson County Court of Common Pleas from 1934 to 1938. He was a Judge of the New Jersey State Court of Common Pleas from 1938 to 1939. He was counsel for the New Jersey State Banking and Insurance Commission from 1939 to 1942.

== Federal judicial service ==
Meaney was nominated by President Franklin D. Roosevelt on May 4, 1942, to a seat on the United States District Court for the District of New Jersey vacated by Judge Thomas Glynn Walker. He was confirmed by the United States Senate on July 1, 1942, and received his commission on July 3, 1942. He assumed senior status on May 1, 1966. Meaney served in that capacity until his death.

== Death ==
A resident of Jersey City, Meaney died at Saint Barnabas Medical Center in Livingston, New Jersey on May 17, 1968, at the age of 79.

== Sources ==
Legal offices
Preceded by Thomas Glynn Walker	Judge of the United States District Court for the District of New Jersey; 1942–1966	Succeeded by Lawrence Aloysius Whipple
