= Liberty Weekend =

1986 celebration marking the restoration and centenary of the Statue of Liberty

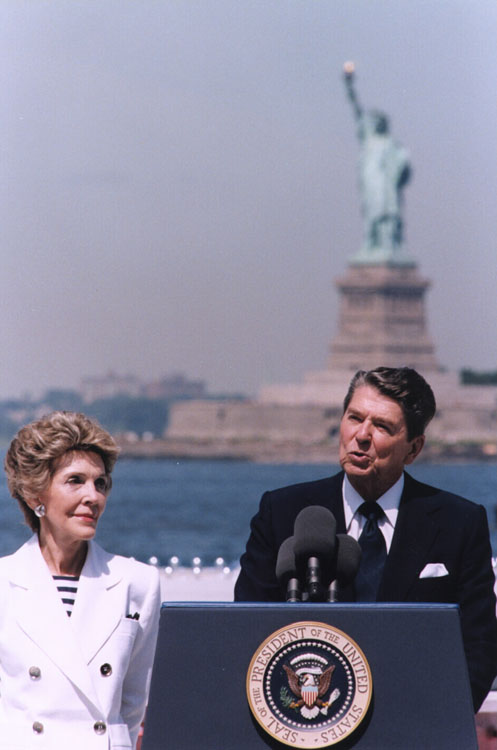
President Ronald Reagan on Governors Island delivering a speech; First Lady Nancy Reagan is to the left (July 4, 1986)

Liberty Weekend was a four-day celebration held to mark the 1984–86 restoration and the centenary of the Statue of Liberty (Liberty Enlightening the World) in New York City. It began on July 3, 1986, and ended on July 6.

== July 3, 1986: opening ceremonies ==
The Opening Ceremonies of Liberty Weekend were held on July 3, 1986, at Governors Island in New York Harbor. French President François Mitterrand was on hand to give his well wishes to the American people. Secretary of the Interior Donald Hodel, Executive Producer David L. Wolper, and the Chairman of the Statue of Liberty-Ellis Island Foundation Lee Iacocca joined to introduce the President of the United States at the time, Ronald Reagan. The Liberty Orchestra was conducted by John Williams premiering his composition, Liberty Fanfare featuring the Liberty Weekend herald trumpets. The Liberty Weekend Chorus was conducted by N. Brock McElheran, music professor from Crane School of Music, S.U.N.Y. Potsdam, Potsdam, N.Y. The chorus also featured alumni members of the Crane School of Music Chorus. Kenneth Mack Jr. sang the National Anthem. Gregory Peck, Elizabeth Taylor and Frank Sinatra also sang.

Reagan spoke of the friendship between France and the United States with an emphasis on the workers conducting the restoration work. He then unveiled the Statue for the first time since its restoration. This was followed by musical performances by Neil Diamond (who sang "They're Coming to America"), Larry Gatlin (who sang “Freedom”), Frank Sinatra (who sang "The House I Live In"), Jose Feliciano and Diane Schuur singing a duet ("The American Wedding Song"), as well as dancer Mikhail Baryshnikov, among others. Ted Koppel of ABC News Nightline presented the Medal of Liberty to outstanding naturalized Americans.

Emil Mosbacher, organizer of Operation Sail, and Secretary of the Navy John Lehman spoke of the following day's events. Reagan spoke again, this time symbolically lighting the torch of the Statue of Liberty, by pressing a button shooting a laser from the podium to torch. This was done from the flight deck of the aircraft carrier USS John F. Kennedy. Finally, a fireworks display set to "The Stars and Stripes Forever" was enacted above the statue as well as the skyline of New York city.

Warren Burger, Chief Justice of the United States, swore in immigrants to the United States in a naturalization ceremony on Ellis Island.

The temperature in the harbor was about 40 °F (5 °C) that night with a sharp wind blowing across Governors Island.

== July 4, 1986: Operation Sail, Americana music concert, and fireworks ==
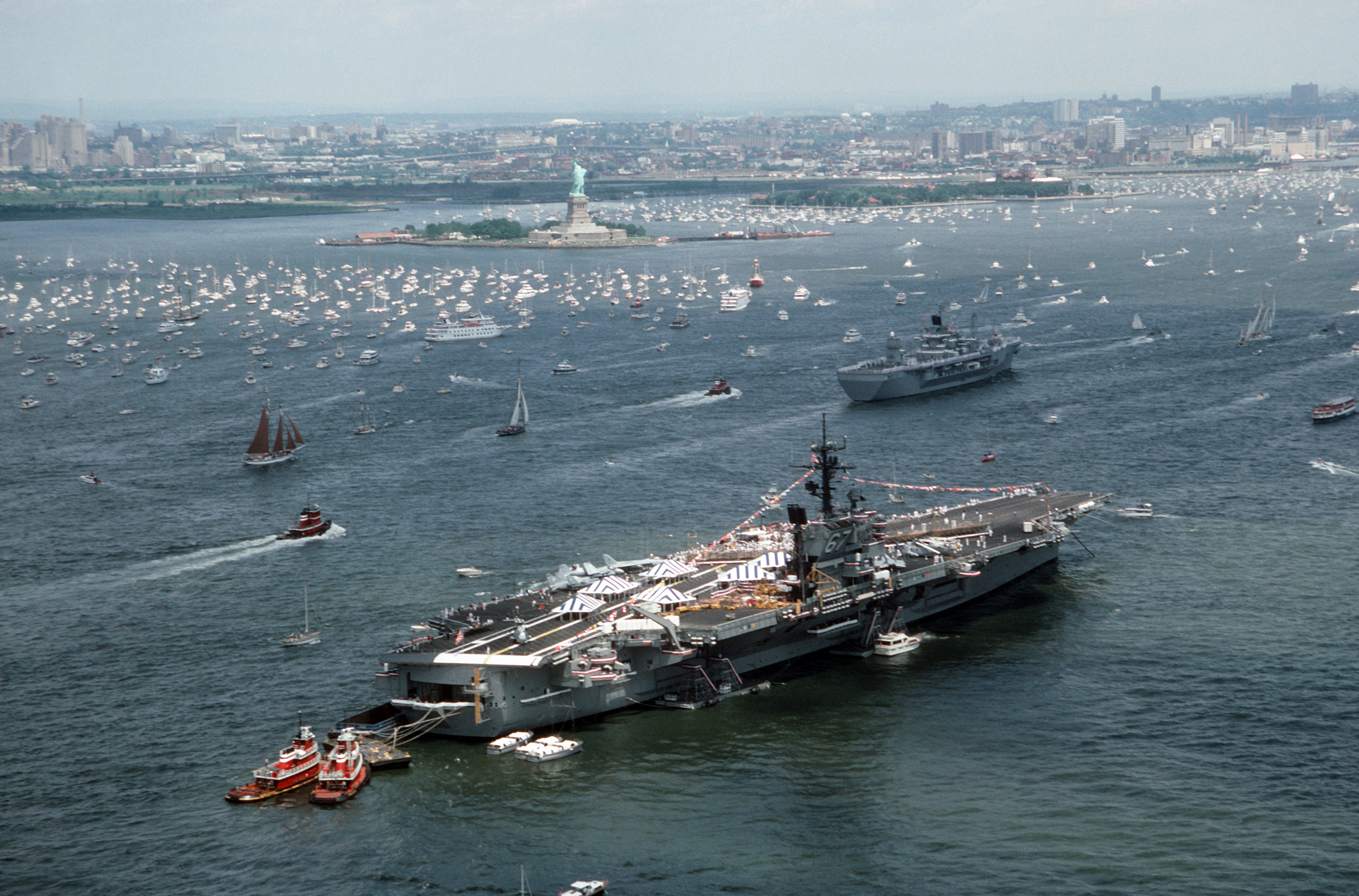
Operation Sail

On the morning of July 4, 1986, the battleships and sailing ships of old took part in a naval revue down the Hudson River, including the largest flotilla of tall ships to assemble in modern history. Reagan viewed the ships from USS Iowa. He described the ships as a personification of freedom and liberty:

Perhaps, indeed, these vessels embody our conception of liberty itself: to have before one no impediments, only open spaces; to chart one's own course and take the adventure of life as it comes; to be free as the wind – as free as the tall ships themselves. It's fitting, then, that this procession should take place in honor of Lady Liberty.

Participants in Operation Sail 1986:

- USCGC Eagle (United States)
- Ernestina (United States)
- Danmark (Denmark)
- PH Jeanne d'Arc (FR)
- HMS Sirius (UK)
- HMS Cleopatra (UK)
- HMS Ark Royal (UK)
- Christian Radich (Norway)
- Schulschiff Deutschland 61/62 AAR
- Libertad (Argentina)
- Zenobe Gramme (Belgium)
- Bluenose II (Canada)
- Esmeralda (Chile)
- ARC Gloria (Colombia)
- BAE Guayas (Ecuador)
- Belem (France)
- Dewaruci (Indonesia)
- Galaxy (Israel)
- Amerigo Vespucci (Italy)
- ARM Cuauhtémoc (Mexico)
- HNLMS Abraham Crijnssen (The Netherlands)
- Sorlandet (Norway)
- Shabab Oman (Oman)
- NRP Sagres (Portugal)
- Juan Sebastian de Elcano (Spain)
- Svanen of Stockholm (Sweden)
- Calida (Scotland)
- Capitan Miranda (Uruguay)
- Simón Bolívar (Venezuela)
- Elissa (United States)
- Spirit of Massachusetts (United States)
- Gazela of Philadelphia (United States)
- SES Lotus (United States)
- RFA Resource (UK)

Later, the Boston Pops Orchestra conducted by John Williams conducted a concert of classic American music at Liberty State Park in New Jersey (the closest landmass to Liberty Island itself). It also featured musical performances from (in order) John Denver, Melissa Manchester, Clamma Dale with Simon Estes, Joel Grey, Whitney Houston, Johnny Cash, James Whitmore, and Barry Manilow. Also in attendance were notables such as Steven Spielberg, Amy Irving, Robert Dole, NYC Mayor Ed Koch, NY State Governor Mario Cuomo, Mr. and Mrs. Henry Kissinger, Itzhak Perlman, Cardinal O'Connor, Don King, Pierre Salinger, June Carter Cash, Alan Shepard, Diahann Carroll, and Coretta Scott King.

This was followed by an address by Reagan aboard USS John F. Kennedy, and a 30-minute fireworks display and concert, scored and conducted by Joe Raposo, the highlight of the night. It was the largest fireworks display in American history, and at the time the largest in the world. The display included 22,000 aerial fireworks, launched from 30 barges and other vantage points, in addition to 18,000 set pieces. It was co-produced by four family-owned fireworks firms, namely the Zambelli, Grucci, Santore and Sousa families.

== July 5, 1986: grand reopening, concert ==
On July 5, 1986, First Lady Nancy Reagan re-opened the statue to the public accompanied by 100 French and American young singers: Paris Boys Choir and Harlem Boys Choir.

At 4:30 pm, a "Great Blimp Race" took place over the Hudson River, with four airships racing against each other for charity on a 12-mile course from the George Washington Bridge down to Battery Park in Lower Manhattan. The race was filmed by a fifth airship, and two others circled the city. The race was won by the Fuji blimp in 15 minutes and 36 seconds. Resorts International came second, followed by McDonald's and Citibank. The winner received a two-foot-long airship trophy from James Hoge, Daily News publisher, and the $25,000 Citibank Charity Challenge Cup fund went to the Boys' Clubs of America.

That night, a joint concert by the New York Philharmonic and the United States Marine Band was held in Central Park conducted by Zubin Mehta and Col. John Bourgeois, with special guests (in order) Plácido Domingo, Joseph Flummerfelt, Marilyn Horne, Itzhak Perlman, Yo-Yo Ma, Sherrill Milnes and Leona Mitchell. At that time, a record-breaking 800,000 people were reported to have attended (largest audience in the world until 1994, and still the largest ever in the US and third largest ever recorded worldwide).

== July 6, 1986: closing ceremonies ==
The closing ceremonies took place at Giants Stadium in New Jersey. The closing ceremonies featured a tribute to sports and pop culture, with the following performers and speakers (in order): Fabian Forte, Frankie Avalon, Buddy DeFranco, Charlton Heston, Waylon Jennings, Gene Kelly, Patti LaBelle, Gerry Mulligan, Willie Nelson, Kenny Rogers, The Pointer Sisters, Manhattan Transfer, The Golden Boys of Bandstand, Shirley MacLaine, and Liza Minnelli.

== Broadcast ==
The entire event was broadcast on ABC, with Peter Jennings and Barbara Walters as commentators. ABC News had paid $10 million for broadcasting rights. CBS also broadcast parts of the event, including Operation Sail 1986. Christian recording artist Sandi Patty recorded a new version of "The Star-Spangled Banner", which was played as part of the broadcast.

== Production ==
In his book Even This I Get To Experience, television personality Norman Lear stated that he was the one who produced the four-day special, which he described as "my parade" of "tall ships". Lear also stated that he used the Israeli ship, The Galaxy, which set sail during the event, to host a private party celebrating his upcoming marriage to his fiancée Lyn and that he in part made the special so that it would coincide with this party as well.

== See also ==
- Liberty Fanfare
- Medal of Liberty
