= Medal of Liberty =

- Country: United States
- Presented by: President Ronald Reagan
- First award: 1986

The Medal of Liberty was awarded in 1986 by President Ronald Reagan as part of the festivities commemorating the 100th anniversary of the Statue of Liberty (Liberty Enlightening the World). The awarding of this medal took place only once, as it was linked to a specific event. No other Medals of Liberty have been awarded since Liberty Weekend 1986, although it is possible more may be awarded in the future.

== History ==
The medal was awarded in 1986 by President Reagan to twelve outstanding people chosen as representative of the most distinguished naturalized citizens of the United States of America. David L. Wolper, producer of ABC's television's 1986 Independence Day Weekend media event, came up with the idea to have the President present awards to a select group of naturalized citizens as an essential part of the ceremonial festivities commemorating the 100th anniversary of the dedication of the Statue of Liberty in New York Harbor.

== Design ==
The Medal of Liberty is a circular, bronze medallion, seven inches in diameter, hand finished and patinated by Alex Shagin. On the obverse of the medal is the bust of Frédéric Bartholdi, facing slightly to the right and holding in his right hand his small bronze sculpture of Liberty Enlightening the World, his template for the construction of the Statue of Liberty National Monument at the mouth of the Hudson River in New York Harbor. Bartholdi's name appears vertically, his middle name, Auguste, to the left of his bust and his surname to the right.

== Recipients ==
Medal recipients were announced by Ted Koppel of ABC News.

Recipient	Birthplace
Irving Berlin (1888–1989)	Russia
Franklin Chang-Díaz (born 1950)	Costa Rica
Kenneth B. Clark (1914–2005)	Panama Canal Zone
Hanna Holborn Gray (born 1930)	Germany
Bob Hope (1903–2003)	United Kingdom
Henry Kissinger (1923-2023)	Germany
I. M. Pei (1917–2019)	China
Itzhak Perlman (born 1945)	Israel
James Reston (1909–1995)	United Kingdom
Albert Sabin (1906–1993)	Russia
An Wang (1920–1990)	China
Elie Wiesel (1928–2016)	Romania

As of June 2025, Franklin Chang Díaz, Hanna Holborn Gray, and Itzhak Perlman are the only living holders of the Medal of Liberty.
