= Conservation-restoration of the Statue of Liberty =

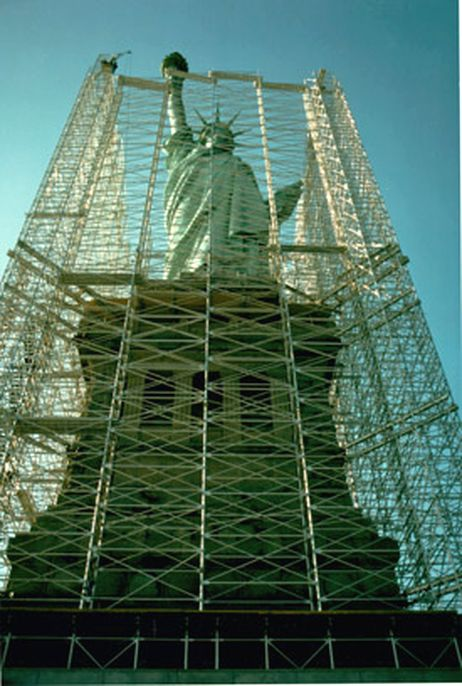
Statue of Liberty restoration project, 1984

The Statue of Liberty (Liberty Enlightening the World), a colossal sculpture on Liberty Island in New York Harbor, underwent an extensive conservation-restoration between 1984 and 1986, in advance of its centennial. The statue, designed by French sculptor Frédéric Auguste Bartholdi, is part of the Statue of Liberty National Monument. International attention to the Statue of Liberty's poor state was called upon the restoration of similarly-built Aimé Millet's Vercingétorix statue in eastern France. Much of the Statue of Liberty restoration effort was based on unprecedented restorative methods, as metallurgical repair work on such a large scale had never been attempted. Many scientists, engineers, government organizations, and professional consultants evaluated and dealt with the various problems and tasks facing the restoration effort.

The restored statue was reopened during Liberty Weekend, its 100-year anniversary celebration held July 3–6, 1986.

== Pre-restoration documentation efforts ==
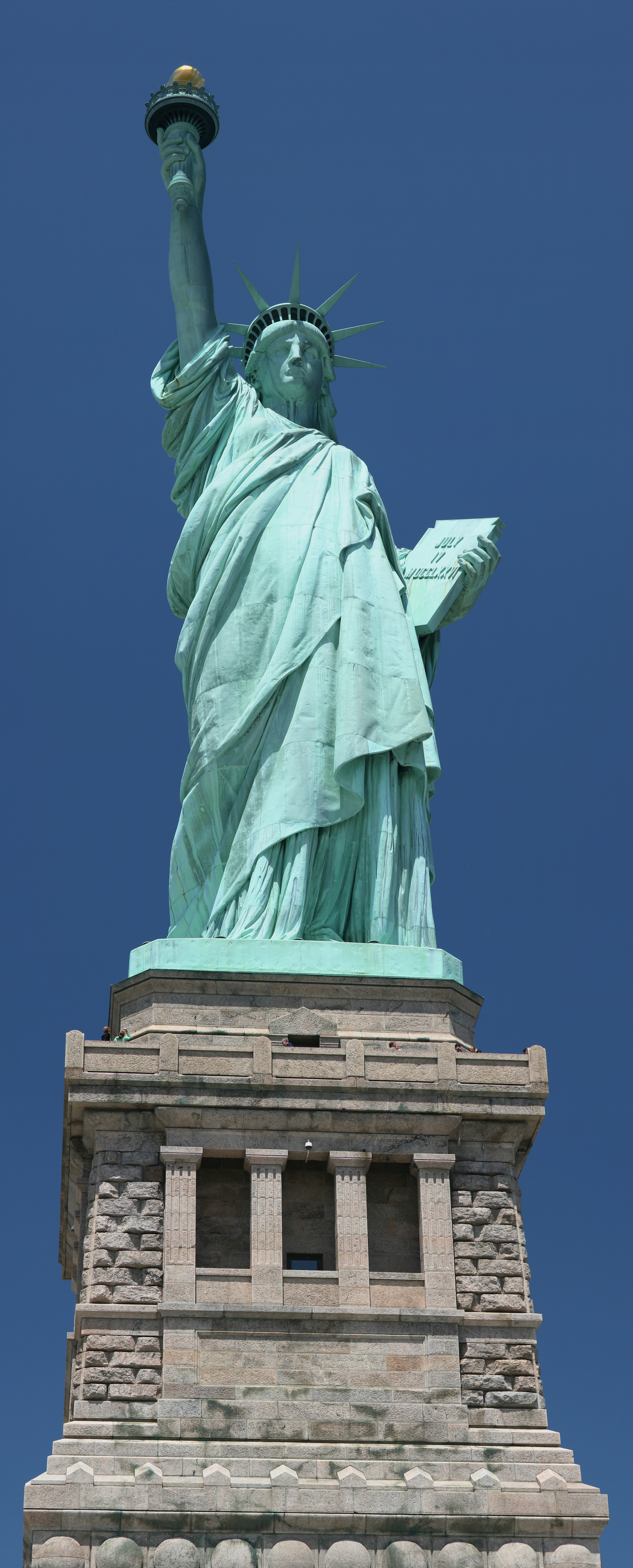
View of the Statue of Liberty from Liberty Island (2008)

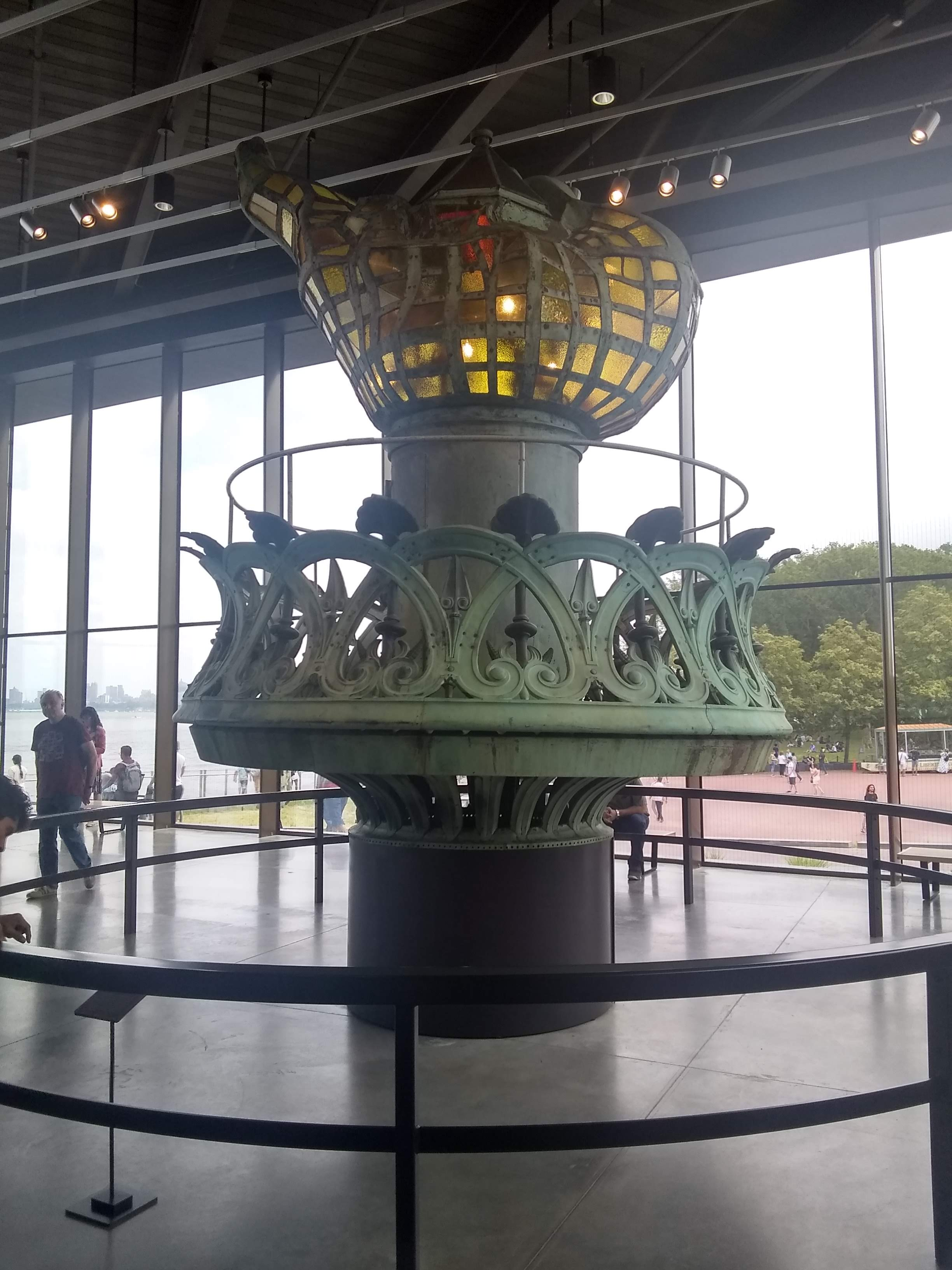
The original torch carried by Liberty from 1886 to 1984 was removed in the restoration and is now exhibited in the Statue of Liberty Museum on Liberty Island.

The preparations for the centennial celebration of the Statue of Liberty began in 1979. The centennial conservation-restoration project was formed by the National Park Service (NPS), the custodians of the statue since 1933, to investigate possible development alternatives. A report titled "Analysis of Alternatives", published in December 1980, proposed measures to remedy the certain conditions confronting visitors to the Statue of Liberty, such as the long lines and waiting time to enter the crown of the statue. The proposed measures included the instatement of systems for numbered ticketing and early warnings that would allow visitors to estimate any possible waiting times and to be conveniently advised if and when to visit or enter the statue. The report also discussed ways to streamline ferry access both to and from Liberty Island and Ellis Island. The early report did not address the ever-deteriorating physical condition of the statue, which was already readily apparent.

The French American Committee for the Restoration of the Statue of Liberty was formed in May 1981. The Department of the Interior (of which the National Park Service is a bureau) later that month, on May 26, agreed to a working relationship with the Committee. In June 1981, the Committee was incorporated as a non-profit foundation licensed by the State of New York to raise funds for the restoration effort. The Committee hired four French consultants said to have considerable expertise in their respective fields: an architect-engineer, a metals expert, a structural engineer and a mechanical engineer who were asked to compose a technical report on the physical condition of the statue. The French consultants visited Liberty Island in May, June, October and December 1981, before presenting a preliminary white paper to the National Park Service on the seventeenth of December in Washington, D.C., titled "French Technical Report on Restoring the Statue of Liberty".

The report, written with the assistance of a regional historical architect from the NPS, was an attempt to identify and address the apparent problems associated with the statue. In the report, the consultants took note of what they saw to be the most serious problem affecting the statue: that two predominant sections, the torch-bearing arm and the rest platform at the head level, had corroded significantly. The report also alluded to the corroded girders toward the top of the pedestal and the bottom of the central pylon. The report also discussed the serious structural problems associated with the long-ago deteriorated insulating layer between the copper sheet of the statue and the iron bands of the structural armature, as it had caused the iron bands to corrode. Alterations over the intervening years (1887–1916) to the torch had created such irreversible damage to the integral stability of that segment, that it was advised in the report that the torch be replaced. In order to more thoroughly assess possible damage that may be hidden beneath the layers of paint on the central pylon, the French consultants also suggested that the layers of paint covering it be removed. Two alternative proposals for modernizing the stairway within the statue were also proposed. From these preliminary observations, a number of preservation and replacement priorities were made. The white paper was further assessed and scrutinized by the NPS and other officials at the Department of the Interior in the nation's capital on March 5, 1982. The director of the NPS was impressed by the report, but also concerned about the future prospects of the Committee's fund raising efforts.

Shortly thereafter, the Secretary of the Department of the Interior announced in May 1982 the creation of a 21-member Statue of Liberty-Ellis Island Centennial Commission (better known as the Statue of Liberty-Ellis Island Foundation) which would act as an "umbrella group" overseeing the French American Committee and the Ellis Island Restoration Commission. The Statue of Liberty-Ellis Island Foundation would try to privately raise funds for the restoration efforts. A report prepared by the NPS in September 1982, titled "General Management Plan", sought to discuss the fundraising aims and objectives of the newly created foundation, but reiterated most of the proposed measures (concerning the statue) of the earlier 1980 report "Analysis of Alternatives" (such as numbered ticketing systems, etc.).

Earlier in 1982, the French American Committee began looking for U.S. consultants to complement the technical work already begun by the four French consultants. They would need to prepare a detailed diagnostic report to investigate the conditions of the Statue in further detail, as many of the French consultants were unfamiliar with the construction procedures and standards, and the design and business practices employed in the United States. Several architects, structural engineers, and representatives from the NPS were brought aboard on the project. Construction work would be assigned to U.S. contractors, and by July 1983, a joint diagnostic report was completed by the newly joint group of consultants and presented to NPS officials. By December 1983, the U.S. group assumed many of the responsibilities concerning the design aspect of the project, and by August 1984, the U.S. team terminated its contract with the French American Committee, owing to the Committee's considerable fundraising problems and other related matters. The associate architect for the restoration was Thierry Despont, who would later rise to prominence as the architect of homes for Bill Gates and Les Wexner.

Just prior to the restoration efforts, there were an insufficient number of photographs documenting the initial reassembly of the statue (when it had been given), and too few photographs documenting the condition of the statue since its construction that were relevant to the maintenance of the statue. The NPS vowed to support the historical documentation effort, and a photographer was hired to photograph the entirety of the restoration—before, during, and after. Owing to this decision, an archive of two hundred large format photographs—both black and white, and multicolor—were developed for NPS and the Historic American Engineering Record (HAER). According to The New York Times, the American Society of Civil Engineers (ASCE) would also be donating a set of three-dimensional computer drawings of the statue, rendered in the computer-aided design (CAD) program. The drawings were to aid in the future maintenance of the statue. These drawings were later given to the NPS, and were important in analyzing the wind bearing capacity of the structure within the statue.

== Implementation of diagnostic assessments ==
=== Early beginnings ===
From November 7, 1982, public announcements were made by project officials that the Statue of Liberty would be completely closed to the public for as long as one year beginning in 1984. The statue had been closed only once before for such an extended period of time, and that was at one point in the late 1930s. Later announcements stated that the erection of the scaffolding surrounding the outside of the statue would begin in the fall of 1983, and it was still believed in July 1983 that the restoration would begin sometime in the fall. NPS representatives retracted and revised the earlier announcement concerning the closure of the Island to the public; Liberty Island would in fact remain open and closings would be intermittent and only for several days at a time at most. The restoration would not begin until January 23, 1984. An article from The New York Times published the day after, indicated that the 30-month project had officially begun the day before, and that visitors would have approximately two weeks remaining before the statue would be completely enshrouded by the tons of extruded aluminum scaffolding that had just been deposited on Liberty Island.

The scaffolding contract was awarded to a company called Universal Builders Supply (UBS) Inc. on December 14, 1983. The contract stipulated that the freestanding exterior scaffold was to be completely assembled by April 27, 1984. The 240-foot-high (73 m) scaffolding was designed specifically for the statue, and required ingenuity from its designers, as it could only be attached to the granite pedestal and not the statue and had to accommodate the intricate contours of the statue as well. Furthermore, the exterior scaffolding had to maintain a distance of at least 18 inches from any exposed section of the copper sheathing. The 6,000 or so separate components of the scaffold, made of a high load capacity aluminum (alloy 6061 T6), were unloaded onto Liberty Island on January 23, 1984. Aluminum was used to prevent possible rust stains from affecting the exterior patina of the statue. Screw jacks were used to brace the aluminum against the granite pedestal of the statue. More easily an interior scaffolding was developed made of interlocking pipes held together with friction clamps and anchored to the central pylon of the statue for structural support. The twenty UBS workers often resorted to assembling the interior scaffolding when the severe winds and dreadful winter weather conditions prevented them from continuing their work outside.

=== Interior coating removal ===
Once the interior scaffolding was installed, a thorough evaluative survey of the interior coatings was executed. The acknowledged presumption of most involved in the restoration was that all coatings would be removed from the interior metals, that repairs would be made, that metals would be recoated, and the interior would be adequately weatherproofed. The preexisting interior coatings on both the secondary wrought iron framework and the wrought iron central pylon would be removed along with the multiple layers of coal tar and paint that had been applied to the internal copper sheathing. An article in The New York Times of February 8, 1984, mentioned that the interior copper which was at that time painted "government green" would be cleaned to resemble the salmon color of a new penny. That outermost "government green" layer was a vinyl paint applied in 1975.

Because certain sections that had corroded were hidden beneath the layers of coatings, no attempt was made to salvage any of the seven layers of paint, (consisting of a base coat of red lead primer plus six additional coats) and the two layers of bituminous paint (a coal tar coating) that had been used as a water sealant in the statue's interior around 1911. The three available coating removal methods tested, developed (or not) and implemented (or not) were: thermal coating removal, abrasive coating removal and chemical coating removal. The methods contemplated for the removal of the coatings on the interior copper differed from that of the other interior metals. For the preparation of the wrought iron parts of the statue, an abrasive removal method also known as dry sandblasting was implemented in order to prevent against flash rusting. The low dusting abrasive material used in the dry sandblasting technique was aluminum oxide. The contractor firm responsible for much of the cleaning and painting of the Statue of Liberty, Ben Strauss Industries of New York, used over $90,000 worth of aluminum oxide supplied by Norton Corp. of Massachusetts to blast the corroded layer of iron from the rusting frame.

Several coating removal methods for the interior copper were ruled out. According to the evaluative research completed, the abrasive removal method (involving aluminum oxide) could damage the underlying layer of the copper substrate. Highly flammable and toxic chemical removal methods were ruled out, as they would have been far too time-consuming and could have negatively affected the delicate patina of the exterior (if seepage of the chemicals were to have occurred).

=== Alternative removal method adopted ===
Two researchers, an architectural conservator from Columbia University and a historical architect working for the North Atlantic Historic Preservation Center (NAHPC) sought to address the attendant difficulties of removing the different layers of paint without further damaging the statue. The researchers finally decided upon an innovative cryogenic removal method, in which liquid nitrogen was sprayed on the paint-covered surface. The liquid nitrogen would embrittle the layers of the paint at −320 °F (−195.6 °C), causing the cracking paint to lose the adherent properties it once possessed. It was estimated that approximately 3,500 US gallons (13,000 L) of liquid nitrogen would be needed for the interior coating removal. According to the researchers, "the use of liquid nitrogen in large scale coating removal was somewhat innovative." The Linde division of the Union Carbide Corporation of Danbury, Connecticut, which at the time was almost the "largest producer of liquid atmospheric gases in the United States", donated the liquid nitrogen for the restoration efforts. The company's researchers also worked with the NPS in fabricating special tools for controlling the application of the liquid nitrogen.

While the cryogenic method was successful in removing the top coating, it was inadequate for the removal of the two final layers of bituminous coating that were below the surface of the seven layers of lead and vinyl based paints. Victor Strauss, president of Ben Strauss Industries, tried a wide range of substances in the search for the right blasting material to remove the coal tar, including cherry pits, powdered glass, plastic pellets, salt, rice, and sugar. However, all were either "too abrasive or too mild. Strauss then considered sodium bicarbonate (baking soda), noting that it is used in household cleaning and in museums for cleaning delicate artifacts. When test blasting at 60 PSI, the contractor found it removed coal tar but did not harm copper.

A small yet powerful sandblasting tool that would sandblast and vacuum simultaneously was developed specifically for the removal of the stubborn coating. Ben Strauss Industries worked with the Blast and Vac company of Bolivar, Ohio to design "a standard blasting nozzle inside a vacuum cleaner head" to prevent excessive dust from forming in the interior of the statue by sucking the abrasive and coating chips into a tank.

A commercial grade bicarbonate of soda, manufactured by Arm & Hammer was donated by the ton and applied as the cleaning agent that would be abrasive yet gentle on the copper sheathing. Because baking soda absorbs moisture in the air, dehumidifiers were installed at the compressor pumping air to the blasting tools to keep the tools from clogging. Once the coal tar was stripped, the baking soda leaked through the holes and crevices in the sheathing, and was affecting the coloration of the patina on the external side of the statue so the workers would rinse the outer surface of the statue, to prevent the baking soda from turning the green patina of the statue blue.

=== Coating and sealant application ===
Once the layers of paint had been removed from the interior of the statue, the architects and engineers knew that a coating system far more suitable than any of the preexisting applications that had been used would need to be implemented to protect the iron of the statue's interior. The coating would have to be able to provide protection against corrosion in a marine environment and have to have a zero level VOC (volatile organic compound) emission rating. A coating was sought for the sandblasted central pylon, and the secondary framework, and was found.

In 1970, a patent was awarded to NASA for a zinc silicate primer coating called K-Zinc 531, the name owing to the ratio of silicon/potassium to water being 5:3:1. The coating had the following characteristics: it was non-toxic, non-flammable, and would dry smoothly on metals within half an hour of surface application. In 1981, NASA granted the license for the coating to Shane Associates of Wynnewood, Pennsylvania. In 1982, a company called Inorganic Coatings (IC), based in Malvern, Pennsylvania, signed an agreement with the former company to become the sole manufacturer and sales agent of the zinc silicate variant. The protective coating was renamed IC 531, but much like the original coating developed by NASA was a high-ratio waterborne zinc silicate. The IC 531 was used in the restoration efforts to provide a number of the structural elements of the statue with superior corrosion resistance.

== Iron armature system ==
=== Condition of the iron grid system prior to restoration ===
Although many of the armature bars were replaced in 1937–38, the restoration effort involved the successful attempt to replace nearly every 2 by 5/8 inch (51 by 16 mm) ribbon-like armature bar that made up the unique internal structure of the statue (as the bars are not connected to the copper skin, but are held in place by the copper saddles that are riveted into the copper skin). An article in The New York Times of December 17, 1985 indicated that the most serious internal problem with the statue was the corrosion that had taken place in the iron armatures which provide the support to the copper sheathing. Eiffel knew that galvanic reaction would immediately pose a problem, owing to the dissimilarity of the metals used in the statue (copper and iron), which unless insulated would corrode rapidly. However, the method used to try to prevent galvanic corrosion of the armature system had proven to be ineffective.

The original insulating layer implemented between the copper sheathing and the iron bars was an asbestos cloth soaked in shellac. This insulating and isolating system had separated the two metals when it was constructed, but the ingeniously devised system had broken down over time and was compromising the structural stability of many different components. The insulating layer had lost much of its functional isolating capacity due to exposure to interior condensation, leakage and possibly from other variable atmospheric effects of the marine environment. It had deteriorated into a sponge-like material which merely retained the saltwater as a conductive electrolyte. Hastening the decline of the corroded iron, the buildup of corrosive discharge exerted pressure on the riveted copper saddles that had held the iron bars in place. This created buckling and warping, and further caused the rivets to become disjointed. Rainwater would seep into the holes in the copper sheathing which once held the disjointed rivets. Some of the seams and holes were still sealed and coated with a coal tar paint applied in 1911. The streaks of coal tar paint from when it had been applied 74 years earlier were still visible during the restoration efforts. Black tar streaks from these so-called "weep holes" were running down the exterior of the statue and had altered the patina of the external copper sheathing.

An atmospheric research scientist and a technical assistant from AT&T Bell Laboratories, developed a greenish liquid composed of corroded copper particles roughly matching the statue's exterior in chemical composition, which was then sprayed over the tar streaked exterior. The sprayed on particles were then left to develop and spread over the streaks and stains. Both researchers, specializing in the study of the corrosion on copper and copper alloys became interested in the restoration efforts and proposed to donate their expertise to the restoration effort as it would afford them with an opportunity to study the effects of the atmosphere on the hundred-year-old copper structure.

=== Replacement of the iron grid system ===
Copper was considered as a possible alternative metal for the replication of the "puddled" iron armatures but was ruled out. The NPS performed tests to assess the suitability of possible replacement materials for the iron bars. 316L stainless steel was selected to replace the approximately 1800 iron armature bars, and Ferralium, a high chromium stainless steel alloy, was chosen to replace the flat bars that connect the secondary framework to the armature. As the armatures provide the structural support for the copper skin, it was determined that no more than four bars from each of four different sections of the statue (for a total of sixteen bars) be removed at any given time. These were then replicated mostly by eye, and the replacements installed within 36 hours of the removal of the original. An art restoration company working along with a steel contractor undertook the difficult task.

Replacement bars were annealed and sandblasted to remove iron filings and other contaminants that would or could eventually cause the stainless steel to rust, and then dipped in nitric acid for protection. The "long term service behavior" of 316L stainless steel, according to a professor of metallurgy at Massachusetts Institute of Technology who had some involvement in the early stages of the restoration effort, was not known. The replacement bars of the iron grid system were insulated from the copper with a PTFE (Teflon) polymer resin tape produced by the DuPont company.

An article in The New York Times of May 31, 1986, reported that inspection crews overseeing the restoration efforts had noticed several months earlier that a 5-foot-long (1.5 m) armature bar near one of the arms had been stamped with the forty names of the forty iron workers who had installed the armatures. The bar, which had to be replaced, was paid for by the contractors. Before being replaced, the bar was photographed; the image is in the June 1986 issue of Smithsonian magazine.

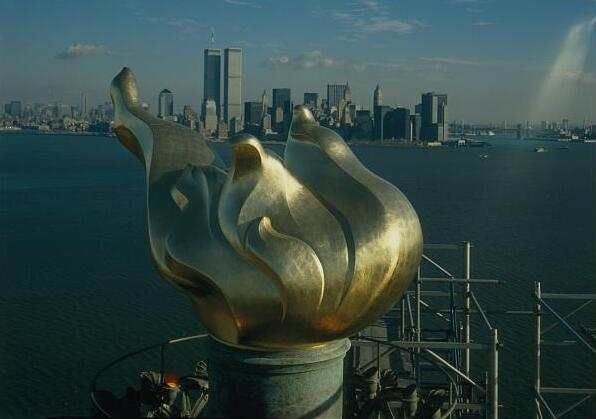
The new torch (1985)

=== Torch ===
The torch was removed from the statue on July 4, 1984. An article in The New York Times from October 8, 1984, stated that the new torch was to be completed in the same manner that the old torch was made in 14 months by ten craftsmen from Les metalliers Champenois based in Reims, and that a workshop at the statue's base on Liberty Island had been made accessible to the public that month.

In 2018, the original torch was made a permanent exhibit in the newly constructed Statue of Liberty Museum on Liberty Island, which opened the next year.

== Structural misalignment issues ==
=== Initial assessments ===
Within the copper body of the statue is the structural support system consisting of a 97-foot (30 m) central pylon, which is the backbone of the statue. The pylon consists of four girders with horizontal and diagonal cross bracing systems, which provide support to the secondary framework and to the armature, and a 40-foot-long (12 m) extension that supports the raised arm and torch. It had been a well-documented fact that since at least 1932 (when the War Department reinforced the arm-shoulder structure), that the support for the shoulder of the upheld arm had been misaligned. Then, it was discovered that the arch that supports the head of the statue had also been misaligned. The cause(s) of the misalignments are undetermined, but a few hypotheses have been suggested. The first hypothesis proposed was that Viollet le Duc—the engineer who initially worked on the project with Bartholdi and who designed the structural reinforcement of the arm and the head (displayed in 1876 at the Centennial exhibition in Philadelphia) had died after having completed those two sections—and had employed engineering methods that differed significantly from those of the better-known bridge engineer Gustave Eiffel, who had finished the remainder of the work on the statue, and who is generally credited for the statue's remarkable structure. The second hypothesis was that the Americans, after having uncrated the different sections of the statue in 1886, incorrectly reassembled the structural framework. The third hypothesis is that the statue's creator, Bartholdi, was aesthetically dissatisfied when the statue was fully assembled and displayed in Paris on or just prior to July 4, 1884, and that he must have willingly sacrificed the structural integrity for his aesthetic vision.

One of the main architects of the restoration project was initially convinced that the second hypothesis was correct, but according to a quoted and published statement, recent research had convinced him of the veracity of the third hypothesis. The most significant problems were consequences of poor design and construction choices implemented initially, but Eiffel could not have directly been responsible for such glaring mistakes according to the (same) architect. Computer aided design drawings were used to illustrate how the head and the hand wielding the torch had been misaligned, and how the misalignment had caused the spikes of the crown to damage a section of the torch-bearing arm. The "13 trouble spots of the statue" were visually emphasized in a front-page article in The New York Times of July 20, 1983. The head was 2 feet (61 cm) off center and the upheld arm was 18 inches (46 cm) away from where it was designed to be.

With the computer simulations of the CAD program, the architects were able to assess the likelihood of implementing either of the following options to address the misalignment issue: the option of rebuilding the arm-shoulder connection as Eiffel had envisioned it, or they could strengthen the preexisting misalignment by adding new diagonal bracing and steel plates. The latter option would have the intended effect of further reinforcing the repairs that had been made when the problem was initially noticed in 1932 by the War Department when it had jurisdiction over the statue. Regardless, the "finite element analysis" of the computer simulation showed that both solutions would work. Additional supports were also added inside the head to improve overall stability. Hence, the positions of the arm and the head would remain as they had been since they were reassembled on Bedloe's Island in 1886.

=== Preservation objectives ===
According to The New York Times, the architects on the project assured the reporter that despite the misalignment, "cosmetic changes" to the statue would not take place. Several commentators on the historic restoration project seemed to have reiterated a similar guiding sentiment: that preservation rather than unnecessary replacement would be the objective of the current restoration effort. This was quite reassuring, in the light of proposals put forward early on during the restoration efforts such as the following: "cleaning and polishing of the statue's exterior; demolition of the statue, selling of the copper and the use of the funds raised to build an exact duplicate in fiberglass; the application of an epoxy coating to the exterior and the construction of a competing monument..."

An article in The New York Times of February 8, 1984, mentioned that the idea to have an elevator that would reach to the crown of the statue had been recently abandoned. A double level hydraulic glass elevator would be installed inside the base of the statue from which visitors would be able to access the crown by ascending a few steps. Much of the interior had been reconstructed, with a great deal of emphasis placed on enhancing the visitors experience, as the original structure was not devised with the visitor in mind, poor lighting conditions, no ventilation and a very inadequate and basic heating system were to be changed.

Prior to the restoration, much of the internal structure of the statue was out of sight behind the mesh wire walls of the original helical stairs. The stairs were originally intended for workmen. Neither the architect nor the artist had envisioned that the lady would welcome visitors internally. Elevators were first installed in 1908–9. An article in The New York Times, published less than a month and a half from the centennial celebration, discussed the changes within the statue as being the most spectacular. The journalist added: that "now that the walls have been removed, what is revealed is an interior that seems to combine the toughness of 19th century industrial construction and the grace of a cathedral."

== Sources ==
- Hayden, Richard Seth; Despont, Thierry W.; Post, Nadine M.; Cornish, Dan (1986). Restoring the Statue of Liberty: sculpture, structure, symbol. New York: McGraw-Hill. ISBN 978-0-07-027327-6.
