= John C. Lifland =

American judge (born 1933)

Senior Judge of the United States District Court for the District of New Jersey
- In office June 15, 2001 – May 31, 2007

Judge of the United States District Court for the District of New Jersey
- In office May 20, 1988 – June 15, 2001
- Appointed by: Ronald Reagan
- Preceded by: Clarkson Sherman Fisher
- Succeeded by: Bill Martini

Personal details
- Born: July 13, 1933 (age 93) Jersey City, New Jersey
- Education: Yale University (B.A.); Harvard Law School (LL.B.)

John Coleman Lifland (born July 13, 1933) is a former United States district judge of the United States District Court for the District of New Jersey.

== Education and career ==
Born in Jersey City, New Jersey, Lifland received a Bachelor of Arts degree from Yale University in 1954 and a Bachelor of Laws from Harvard Law School in 1957. He was in private practice in Newark, New Jersey from 1957 to 1959. He was in the United States Army as a lieutenant in 1958. He was a legal secretary for Judge Thomas F. Meaney of the United States District Court for the District of New Jersey from 1959 to 1961. He was in private practice in Newark from 1961 to 1988.

== Federal judicial service ==
On February 29, 1988, Lifland was nominated by President Ronald Reagan to a seat on the United States District Court for the District of New Jersey vacated by Judge Clarkson Sherman Fisher. He was confirmed by the United States Senate on May 19, 1988, and received his commission on May 20, 1988. He assumed senior status on June 15, 2001. Lifland served in that capacity until his retirement on May 31, 2007.

== Sources ==
Legal offices
Preceded by Clarkson Sherman Fisher	Judge of the United States District Court for the District of New Jersey; 1988–2001	Succeeded by Bill Martini
