= Burton Lifland =

American federal bankruptcy judge

Burton R. Lifland (September 30, 1929 – January 12, 2014) was an American federal bankruptcy judge who served as chief judge for the United States Bankruptcy Court for the Southern District of New York and chief judge of the bankruptcy appellate panel for the United States Court of Appeals for the Second Circuit.

Lifland received a B.A. from Syracuse University in 1951, followed by a J.D. from the Fordham University School of Law in 1954. Lifland then entered private practice until his appointment to the bankruptcy court in 1980, later becoming chief judge. In the mid-1980s, Lifland presided over the bankruptcy proceedings of insulation company Johns Manville occasioned by asbestos-related claims.

By the early 1990s, Lifland was described as "the dean of the bankruptcy bar, having handled many of the high-profile cases that have characterized the end of the profligate 1980s", and noted to have "set the tone that has given the Manhattan federal court a reputation as one of the most pro-debtor bankruptcy courts in the nation". In 1992, he presided over bankruptcy proceedings for the Macy's department store merger, during which he required Federated Department Stores to commit to continue holding the Macy's Thanksgiving Day Parade and Macy's 4th of July Fireworks each year. He later oversaw the bankruptcy proceedings of entertainment company Blockbuster Video, natural gas company Calpine, and beverage maker Dana, as well as the aftermath of the Bernie Madoff ponzi scheme, among many other influential cases.
