= List of people from Cherry Hill, New Jersey =

The following is a list of notable people and natives of Cherry Hill, New Jersey.

- John Adler (1959–2011), congressman for New Jersey's 3rd congressional district from 2009 until his death
- Shelley Adler (born 1959), politician
- Kwesi Adofo-Mensah (born 1981), former general manager of the Minnesota Vikings of the National Football League
- Muhammad Ali (1942–2016), former heavyweight boxing champion
- Alene S. Ammond (1933–2019), politician known as the "Terror of Trenton", served in the New Jersey Senate from the 6th Legislative District 1974–1978
- Treena Livingston Arinzeh, biomedical engineer and professor known for her work researching adult stem-cell therapy
- Maurice Ascalon (1913–2003) and David Ascalon, sculptors and co-founders of Ascalon Studios, and the contemporary industrial designer Brad Ascalon
- Brian Baldinger (born 1960), former National Football League player and television sportscaster
- James Barbour (born 1966), singer and Broadway Actor
- Glen Barker (born 1971), former MLB outfielder who played three seasons for the Houston Astros
- Andrew Barroway, hedge fund manager, minority owner of the Arizona Coyotes of the National Hockey League
- Curtis Bashaw (born 1960), real estate developer, entrepreneur and businessman, who was the Republican nominee for the 2024 United States Senate election in New Jersey
- Susan Bass Levin, politician who served as mayor of Cherry Hill and as commissioner of the New Jersey Department of Community Affairs
- Lawrence Bender (born 1957), Academy Award-winning film and television producer whose credits include Reservoir Dogs, Pulp Fiction, Good Will Hunting, An Inconvenient Truth
- Jay Bennett (1912–2009), author and two-time winner of the Edgar Award from the Mystery Writers of America
- James Berardinelli (born 1967), film critic
- Larry Berg, co-founder of Los Angeles FC and commissioner-elect of Major League Soccer
- Barbara Berman (born 1938), politician, represented the 6th Legislative District in the New Jersey General Assembly 1978–1980
- David Bianculli (born 1953/54), TV critic, columnist, radio personality, non-fiction author and university professor
- Mike Bibby (born 1978), former NBA basketball player who played for the Sacramento Kings
- Albert Blaustein (1921–1994), civil rights and human rights lawyer and constitutional consultant who helped draft the Fijian and Liberian constitutions
- Mickey Briglia (1929–2006), college baseball coach at Glassboro State College (since renamed Rowan University), had an overall record of 502–258–9 in his 25 years coaching the Rowan Profs baseball team 1964–1988
- Abraham Browning (1808–1899), attorney general of New Jersey 1845–1850, whose Cherry Hill Farm helped give the township its name and is credited with coining the slogan "The Garden State" for New Jersey
- Jalen Brunson (born 1996), basketball player and two-time All Star for the New York Knicks
- Rick Brunson (born 1972), former professional basketball player who played nine seasons in the NBA, is the father of NBA star Jalen Brunson, and is an assistant coach for the New York Knicks
- Mark Budz (born 1960), science fiction writer
- Jim Bunning (1931–2017), former major league baseball pitcher with the Philadelphia Phillies and former United States Senator from Kentucky
- Matt Bush (born 1986), actor who is best known for the film Adventureland and his AT&T commercials
- Sarah Chang (born 1980), violinist
- Richard Chess (born 1953), poet
- Bobby Clarke (born 1949), former hockey player and former general manager for the Philadelphia Flyers, three-time NHL Hart Memorial Trophy winner, member of the Hockey Hall of Fame
- Stan Clayton (born 1965), former American football guard and tackle who played in the NFL for the Atlanta Falcons and New England Patriots
- Andrew Clements (1949–2019), writer of children's books, known for his debut novel Frindle
- Garry Cobb (born 1957), former linebacker who played in the NFL for the Detroit Lions, Philadelphia Eagles and Dallas Cowboys
- Sherry Coben, creator of the 1980s situation comedy Kate & Allie
- Avon Cobourne (born 1979), former professional running back who played in the NFL for the Detroit Lions and in the CFL for the Montreal Alouettes and Hamilton Tiger-Cats
- Andy Coen (born 1964), head coach of the Lehigh University Mountain Hawks football team since the 2006 season
- Lauren Cohan (born 1982), actress
- Major Coxson (1929–1973), Philadelphia drug kingpin
- Joe Culmone (1931–1996), Thoroughbred horse racing jockey
- Randall Cunningham (born 1963), former NFL quarterback for the Philadelphia Eagles
- Dick Curl (born 1940), first varsity football head coach at Cherry Hill High School East, 1968–1973, who coached for the St. Louis Rams
- Billy DeAngelis (born 1946), professional basketball player who spent one season in the American Basketball Association (ABA) with the New York Nets during the 1970–1971 season
- Elaine DePrince (1947–2024), author, hemophilia activist, teacher, and advocate of adoptive parenting
- Michaela DePrince (born 1995), Sierra Leonean-American ballet dancer
- Eric Dezenhall (born 1962), author of fiction and nonfiction books, including Glass Jaw: A Manifesto for Defending Fragile Reputations in an Age of Instant Scandal, Money Wanders and The Devil Himself
- Laurence Dreyfus (born 1952), musicologist and player of the viola da gamba who was University Lecturer and Fellow of Magdalen College, Oxford
- Angela Duckworth (born 1970), author and professor of psychology at the University of Pennsylvania 2013 MacArthur Grant recipient
- Andrea Dworkin (1946–2005), feminist and writer
- Darren Elias (born 1986), professional poker player who has won three World Poker Tour titles
- Judy Faulkner (born 1943), CEO and co-founder of Epic Systems, a healthcare software company
- Stink Fisher (born 1970), actor and restaurant owner
- Siggy Flicker (born 1967), cast member on the seventh season of Bravo's reality television series The Real Housewives of New Jersey
- Rick Folbaum (born 1969), co-anchor for WNYW-TV New York's weekday 6 pm newscasts, attended Cherry Hill High School West
- Ed Foley (born 1967), football coach and former player
- Ed Foley Sr., former football quarterback; played for the Boston College Eagles 1963–1965; father of Ed and Glenn Foley
- Glenn Foley (born 1970), former NFL quarterback who played in the NFL for the New York Jets and the Seattle Seahawks
- Casey Fossum (born 1978), Major League Baseball pitcher who played at Cherry Hill American Little League
- Jona Frank (born 1966), portrait photographer and author of Cherry Hill A Childhood Reimagined
- Earl N. Franklin (1917–2013), one of the original Tuskegee Airmen
- Yale Galanter (born 1956), criminal defense attorney best known for representing O. J. Simpson since 2000
- Anthony Gigliotti (1922–2001), clarinetist and music teacher, who was principal clarinetist for the Philadelphia Orchestra for 47 years
- Richard Gilewitz, acoustic guitarist known for his use of the fingerstyle technique
- Eric Goldberg (born 1955), animator and film director best known for his work at Walt Disney Animation Studios
- Ken Goldin (born 1965), auctioneer, television personality, and sports card collector
- Bob Greene (born 1958), personal trainer who has been a frequent guest on The Oprah Winfrey Show
- Louis Greenwald (born 1967), politician who represents the 6th Legislative District in the New Jersey General Assembly
- Maria Barnaby Greenwald (1940–1995), first female mayor of Cherry Hill, county freeholder and surrogate
- Tommy Gunn (born 1967), pornographic actor
- Harrison Hand (born 1998), American football cornerback for the Minnesota Vikings
- Gene Hart (1931–1999), longtime Philadelphia Flyers announcer
- Lauren Hart (born 1967), recording artist best known for singing "The Star-Spangled Banner" and "O Canada" prior to Philadelphia Flyers games
- Orel Hershiser (born 1958), former professional baseball pitcher, attended Cherry Hill High School East, Class of 1976
- Tom Hessert III (born 1986), racecar driver in NASCAR and the ARCA Menards Series
- Kevin Hickman (born 1971), former football tight end, played in the NFL for the Detroit Lions 1995–1998
- John Hobbs (born 1956), professional baseball player who pitched for the Minnesota Twins
- Elie Honig, attorney and CNN senior legal analyst
- Billy Hunter (born 1942), former wide receiver in the NFL for the Washington Redskins and Miami Dolphins, and current executive director of the National Basketball Association players' union
- Janaye Ingram, beauty queen and political organizer
- Sam Jacobs, basketball player who played for the Cornell Big Red
- Adam Jasinski (born 1978), winner of Big Brother 9
- Steven L Kane, television and theater writer, producer and director
- Nick Katsikis (born 1967), former professional basketball player
- Tom Katsikis (born 1967), former professional basketball player
- Sean Killion (born 1967), former competition swimmer and Pan American Games gold medalist, who represented the United States at the 1992 Summer Olympics
- Howard Krein, plastic surgeon and otolarynologist
- George F. Kugler Jr. (1925–2004), lawyer, New Jersey attorney general 1970–1974
- Pete Kugler (born 1959), defensive lineman who played ten seasons in the National Football League for the San Francisco 49ers
- Pamela Rosen Lampitt (born 1960), politician who has represented the 6th Legislative District in the New Jersey General Assembly since 2006
- Rick Lancellotti (born 1956), former first baseman-outfielder in Major League Baseball who played for the San Diego Padres, San Francisco Giants and Boston Red Sox
- Ali Larter (born 1976), model, actress, and star of Heroes
- Lee B. Laskin (1936–2020), attorney, politician and judge who served in both houses of the New Jersey Legislature before being appointed to serve on the New Jersey Superior Court
- Aaron Lazar (born 1976), actor and singer, attended Cherry Hill High School West
- Jamie Leach (born 1969), former professional right wing who played in the NHL for the Pittsburgh Penguins, Hartford Whalers and Florida Panthers
- Amos Lee (born 1977), singer-songwriter
- Toby Lightman (born 1978), singer-songwriter and Atlantic Records recording artist
- Michael Lisicky (born 1964), non-fiction writer and oboist with the Baltimore Symphony Orchestra
- Paul Lisicky (born 1959), novelist and memoirist
- John W. Marchetti (1908–2003), radar pioneer
- Greg Mark (born 1967), former defensive end and linebacker who played in the NFL for the Philadelphia Eagles and Miami Dolphins
- Aaron McCargo Jr. (born 1971), chef, television personality and television show host; winner of the fourth season of Food Network's reality television show The Next Food Network Star
- Jim McGorman (born c. 1974), musician, songwriter/producer and multi-instrumentalist
- Donovan McNabb (born 1976), former quarterback for the Philadelphia Eagles
- Cristin Milioti (born 1985), Broadway and film actress, received a 2012 Tony Award nomination for Best Actress in a Musical for Once
- John L. Miller (1925–1989), politician and judge, represented District 3C in the New Jersey Senate 1968–1974
- Nate Mulberg, assistant coach of the Richmond Spiders baseball team and of the Israel national baseball team
- Deborah Needleman, writer, editor-in-chief of T: The New York Times Style Magazine
- Fred Neulander (born 1941), former rabbi of the Congregation M'Kor Shalom, who was convicted of the 1994 contract killing of his wife Carol Neulander
- George Norcross (born 1957), local Democratic party political leader and chief executive of Commerce National Insurance
- Christine O'Hearn (born 1969), lawyer serving as a United States district judge of the United States District Court for the District of New Jersey
- Vince Papale (born 1946), former professional football player, Philadelphia Eagles; the oldest non-kicker rookie in the NFL, and the inspiration for the 2006 film Invincible
- Bernie Parent (1945–2025), ice hockey goalie
- Erik Peterson (born 1966), politician who serves in the New Jersey General Assembly representing the 23rd Legislative District
- Jack Pierce (born 1962), Olympic bronze medalist in the 100-meter high hurdles at the 1992 Olympic Games
- Joe Pisarcik (born 1952), former professional quarterback who played in the National Football League for the New York Giants and Philadelphia Eagles
- Keith Richards (born 1943), guitarist of the Rolling Stones, lived in Cherry Hill while undergoing treatment for heroin addiction in Philadelphia
- Ron Rivera (born 1962), current head coach of the Carolina Panthers and former Super Bowl-winning Chicago Bears linebacker; former assistant coach for the Philadelphia Eagles and Chicago Bears
- John A. Rocco (1936–2020), politician; served in the New Jersey General Assembly 1980–1998, representing the 6th Legislative District; mayor of Cherry Hill
- "Nature Boy" Buddy Rogers (1921–1992), professional wrestler, first World Wide Wrestling Federation World Heavyweight Champion, first man to hold both the World Wide Wrestling Federation and National Wrestling Alliance World Heavyweight Championships
- Tomas Romero (born 2000), goalkeeper for Bethlehem Steel in the United Soccer League
- Leon Rose (born 1961), agent for LeBron James
- J. D. Roth (born 1968), host of Endurance
- Wendy Ruderman (born 1969), journalist for The New York Times who won the 2010 Pulitzer Prize for Investigative Reporting together with Barbara Laker
- Kal Rudman, broadcast pioneer and publisher of the music industry trade journal Friday Morning Quarterback, who assisted the rise of the careers of artists including Bruce Springsteen
- Bobby Ryan (born 1987), professional ice hockey forward for the Detroit Red Wings
- Scott Safran (1967–1989), video gamer; set the world record score, which stood for 27 years, on the arcade game Asteroids
- Anisse Saidi (born 2008), footballer who plays as a forward for Major League Soccer club San Diego FC
- Nadja Salerno-Sonnenberg (born 1961), classical violinist and teacher
- Dominic Sessa (born 2002), actor who made his film debut in Alexander Payne's 2023 coming-of-age film The Holdovers
- Jennifer Sey (born 1969), author, business executive and retired artistic gymnast who was the 1986 U.S. Women's All-Around National Champion
- L. J. Smith (born 1980), former tight end for the Philadelphia Eagles
- Stephen A. Smith (born 1967), sports journalist for The Philadelphia Inquirer and ESPN television personality
- Stable Ronaldo (born 2003), Twitch streamer and YouTuber
- Scott Storch (born 1973), producer and keyboardist who has written for many artists
- Giselle Tavera (born 1993), pop and bachata singer
- Ariel Versace (born 1992), contestant on season 11 of RuPaul's Drag Race
- Blaise Vespe (born 2002), college basketball player for the Florida Gulf Coast Eagles men's basketball team
- Tara Vittese (born 1995), field hockey player who was added to the United States women's national field hockey team
- Michelle Vittese (born 1989), field hockey player selected as part of the U.S. team at the 2016 Summer Olympics
- Mark Voger (born 1959/60), author and journalist
- Bruce A. Wallace (1905–1977), politician, served in the New Jersey Senate 1942–1944 and 1948–1955
- Gary Wang (born c. 1993), computer programmer who was chief technology officer of cryptocurrency exchange FTX, which he founded in 2019 with Sam Bankman-Fried
- Malcolm Wells (1926–2009), architect and environmentalist who championed earth-sheltered building
- Alexa Wilkinson (born 1964), singer-songwriter
