= Briglia =

Briglia is an Italian surname. Notable people with the surname include:

- Alessio Briglia (born 1988), Italian footballer
- Mickey Briglia (1929–2006), American baseball coach
- Paul Briglia (born 1940), Australian rules footballer
