= Attorney General Browning =

Attorney General Browning may refer to:

- Abraham Browning (1808–1889), Attorney General of New Jersey
- Chauncey Browning Sr. (1903–1971), Attorney General of West Virginia
- Chauncey H. Browning Jr. (1934–2010), Attorney General of West Virginia

== See also ==
- General Browning (disambiguation)
