= Jeff Hamburg =

American composer (born 1956)

Jeff Hamburg (born 1956) is an American composer.

Born in Philadelphia, Hamburg was raised in Cherry Hill, New Jersey, and graduated from Cherry Hill High School East in 1975. He then studied acoustics and composition at the University of Illinois and moved to the Netherlands in 1978 to continue his studies at the Royal Conservatory of The Hague with Louis Andriessen. In 1986, he received the Conservatory Prize. He further studied French Horn at the Royal Conservatory and later conducted classes with David Porcelijn at the Conservatory of Utrecht.

In 2002, Hamburg received the Visser-Neerlandia Music Prize for the outstanding quality of his oeuvre. From 2008 to 2015, Hamburg was chairman of the board of Geneco, the Dutch composer's guild.

His translation of The Apollonian Clockwork: On Stravinsky by Elmer Schönberger and Louis Andriessen is published by Oxford University Press.

Together with flutist Eleonore Pameijer, Hamburg started the Dutch cd label FutureClassics.

== Selected works ==
Orchestral

- 2009 Podolian Dances – string orchestra
- 2007 Hear O Heavens – Give Ear, O Earth – symphony orchestra
- 2007 The Wild Waters that Roar – symphony orchestra
- 2004 Ruach – Concerto for Oboe and Orchestra
- 2003 Kumi, Ori – tenor and orchestra
- 2001 Aychah – choir and orchestra
- 2001 Zachor – symphony orchestra
- 2000 Concerto for flute and orchestra
- 1998 Klezmania – chamber orchestra
- 1996 A Prayer and a Dance – string orchestra
- 1994 Zey... (Yiddish) – soprano and orchestra
- 1988 Concertino – alto saxophone and orchestra
- 1982 Symphony in Es (rev. 1994) – symphony orchestra
- 1981 Towers and Bridges – flutes, copper and double bass

Chamber music

- 2008 Sparkle – bassoon solo
- 2007 Jubel – oboe, harp
- 2007 Kaddish – baritone, oboe, cello, harp
- 2006 Danse Africaine – choir a capella
- 2005 Song of Songs (Hebrew) – tenor and flute
- 2002 String Quartet Nr 2 "Hashkivenu" – string quartet
- 2002 Three Jewish Songs – soprano, oboe, violin, cello, accordion, percussion
- 1999 Jerusalem (German, Hebrew, Dutch) – soprano, oboe, violin, viola, cello
- 1999 Uncle Mendel's Ukrainian Blues (Yiddish) – piano w/song
- 1996 Wine, Love and Death (Hebrew text) – soprano, cello, accordion
- 1994 The Golem – big band
- 1991 Roses have thorns (W. Shakespeare) – choir
- 1989 Two songs from "Dance of Death" (A. Strindberg) – soprano, baritone, cello and piano
- 1987 Ma sh'mecha – choir

Vocal works

- 2009 Biografiye – mezzo-soprano, clarinet, violin, viola, cello
- 2009 Finf Yiddish Lieder – mezzo-soprano and harp
- 2007 Kaddish – baritone, oboe, cello, harp
- 2006 Danse Africaine – Four Langston Hughes Songs – choir a capella
- 1984 Dibboek Suite – choir a capella

Music theatre

- 2005 Hooglied (Song of Songs)
- 2005 Thomas (based on a book by Guus Kuijer)
- 1998 Een Golem
- 1992 Joshe Kalb (J. Singer)
- 1992 Esther (English and Hebrew)
- 1990 De jongen die op reis ging om het griezelen te leren (text by Carel Alphenaar)
- 1984 Dibboek (Judith Herzberg)
