= Robert B. Kugler =

American judge (born 1950)

Senior Judge of the United States District Court for the District of New Jersey
- In office November 2, 2018 – May 31, 2024

Judge of the United States Foreign Intelligence Surveillance Court
- In office May 19, 2017 – May 18, 2024
- Appointed by: John Roberts
- Preceded by: Martin Leach-Cross Feldman
- Succeeded by: Karin Immergut

Judge of the United States District Court for the District of New Jersey
- In office December 4, 2002 – November 2, 2018
- Appointed by: George W. Bush
- Preceded by: Joseph E. Irenas
- Succeeded by: Christine O'Hearn

Magistrate Judge of the United States District Court for the District of New Jersey
- In office 1992–2002

Personal details
- Born: Robert Byron Kugler; October 10, 1950 (age 75) Camden, New Jersey, U.S.
- Education: Syracuse University (BA); Rutgers University (JD)

Robert Byron Kugler (born October 10, 1950) is a former United States district judge of the United States District Court for the District of New Jersey and also served as a Judge on the United States Foreign Intelligence Surveillance Court from 2017 to 2024.

== Education and career ==
Kugler was born in Camden, New Jersey. He attended and graduated from The Peddie School in 1968 and received a Bachelor of Arts degree from Syracuse University in 1975 and a Juris Doctor from Rutgers School of Law–Camden in Camden in 1978. He was a law clerk for Judge John F. Gerry of the United States District Court for the District of New Jersey from 1978 to 1979. He was an assistant prosecutor in the Camden County Prosecutor's Office from 1979 to 1981. He was a Deputy attorney general of Division of Criminal Justice, New Jersey Department of Law and Public Safety from 1981 to 1982. He was in private practice in New Jersey from 1982 to 1992.

=== Federal judicial service ===
Kugler was a United States magistrate judge of the United States District Court for the District of New Jersey from 1992 to 2002. He was nominated by President George W. Bush on August 1, 2002, to a seat on the District Court vacated by Joseph E. Irenas. He was confirmed by the United States Senate on November 14, 2002, and received his commission on December 4, 2002. On May 19, 2017 he was appointed to be a judge of the United States Foreign Intelligence Surveillance Court by John Roberts. He assumed senior status on November 2, 2018. He retired from active service on May 31, 2024.

== Family ==
Kugler is the son of George F. Kugler, Jr., who served as New Jersey Attorney General from 1970 to 1974. His brother Pete Kugler played eight seasons in the National Football League for the San Francisco 49ers and two seasons in the United States Football League for the Philadelphia/Baltimore Stars.

== Sources ==
Legal offices
Preceded by Joseph E. Irenas	Judge of the United States District Court for the District of New Jersey; 2002–2018	Succeeded by Christine O'Hearn
Preceded by Martin Leach-Cross Feldman	Judge of the United States Foreign Intelligence Surveillance Court; 2017–2024	Succeeded by Karin Immergut
