= Coles High School Program =

High school in Camden County, New Jersey, US

Location
- 1750 Kresson Road; Cherry Hill, Camden County, New Jersey 08003; United States
- 39.913506°N 74.992376°W

Information
- Type: Alternative public high school
- Established: 1969
- School district: Cherry Hill Public Schools
- NCES School ID: 340300000223
- Principal: Aaron Edwards
- Faculty: 8.0 FTEs
- Grades: 9th-12th
- Enrollment: 32 (as of 2023–24)
- Student to teacher ratio: 4.0:1
- Website: coles.chclc.org

The Coles High School Program (formerly known as Cherry Hill Alternative High School or Estelle Malberg Alternative High School) is an alternative public high school in Cherry Hill in Camden County, in the U.S. state of New Jersey, for students who need behavioral and emotional support.

Starting in the 2024–25 school year, the Cherry Hill Alternative High School was moved from the Lewis Administration Building and renamed as the Coles High School Program, operated as a school-within-a-school at Cherry Hill High School East.

== History ==
The Estelle Malberg facility was built in 1969 and was originally an early childhood center, then became an alternative high school in 1997. Malberg, as it is commonly known to most Cherry Hill residents, is also the location of the Cherry Hill Public Schools administration building, which was previously at the Rosa Administration Building (formerly Heritage Middle School until 1985 and was renamed Rosa International Middle School in 1999).

As of the 2023–24 school year, the school had an enrollment of 32 students and 8.0 classroom teachers (on an FTE basis), for a student–teacher ratio of 4.0:1. There were 11 students (34.4% of enrollment) eligible for free lunch and 1 (3.1% of students) eligible for reduced-cost lunch.

== Awards, rankings and recognition ==
The school was recognized as a New Jersey School of Character in 2013 and as a National School of Character in 2014 by the Character Education Partnership.
