= General Browning =

General Browning may refer to:

- Frederick Browning (1896–1965), British Army lieutenant general
- George M. Browning Jr. (born 1928), U.S. Air Force lieutenant general
- Ralph T. Browning (1941–2018), U.S. Air Force brigadier general

== See also ==
- Attorney General Browning (disambiguation)
