= Norbit =

2007 film by Brian Robbins

- Theatrical release poster
- Directed by: Brian Robbins
- Screenplay by: Eddie Murphy; Charles Murphy; Jay Scherick; David Ronn
- Story by: Eddie Murphy; Charles Murphy
- Produced by: John Davis; Eddie Murphy
- Starring: Eddie Murphy; Thandiwe Newton; Eddie Griffin; Terry Crews; Cuba Gooding Jr.
- Cinematography: Clark Mathis
- Edited by: Ned Bastille
- Music by: David Newman
- Production companies: DreamWorks Pictures; Davis Entertainment; Tollin/Robbins Productions; Murphy Films
- Distributed by: Paramount Pictures
- Release date: February 9, 2007
- Running time: 102 minutes
- Country: United States
- Language: English
- Budget: $60 million
- Box office: $159 million

Norbit is a 2007 American comedy film, directed by Brian Robbins, and co-written by, co-produced by, and starring Eddie Murphy. The film co-stars Thandie Newton, Terry Crews, Cuba Gooding Jr., Eddie Griffin, Katt Williams, Marlon Wayans, and Charlie Murphy (the latter of whom also co-wrote).

Murphy portrays multiple roles including the eponymous Norbit and his abusive, obese wife Rasputia. Norbit, unhappily married, is reunited with his childhood sweetheart Kate, but must contend with Rasputia and her three older brothers and foil a sabotage plan constructed by Rasputia.

Norbit was released by Paramount Pictures on February 9, 2007. While the film was a box office success (grossing $159 million worldwide against a production budget of $60 million), it received generally negative reviews from critics and was nominated for eight Golden Raspberry Awards (winning three), although it also received a nomination for the 2008 Academy Award for Best Makeup.

== Plot ==
In Boiling Springs, Tennessee, childhood friends Norbit Albert Rice and Kate Thomas live at an orphanage with an attached Chinese restaurant called The Golden Wonton owned by Mr. Hangten Wong. They marry each other in a pretend childhood ceremony with Ring Pops, but are separated when Kate is adopted.

Five years later, a tough, overweight girl named Rasputia Latimore saves Norbit from bullies, and becomes his girlfriend, and then wife. Norbit is intimidated by Rasputia's three, muscular older brothers "Big Black" Jack, Blue, and Earl, working as a bookkeeper at their family-run construction company. The Latimore brothers also run an extortion "security business", instilling fear in most of the community, aside from Mr. Wong; who refuses to sell his business and is not fazed by their tactics.

After catching Rasputia cheating on him with her "power tap" dance instructor, Norbit insults her by calling her "The Queen of Whores" and is chased through the neighborhood. Heartbroken over the betrayal, Norbit discards his wedding ring and vents his anger at a puppet show for the orphans. Much to his surprise, Kate is in the audience and his interest in her is reignited. She intends to purchase the orphanage, and much to the disappointment of Norbit; she is engaged to a man named Deion Hughes.

Aided by his friends and the townsfolk, Norbit secretly meets Kate behind Rasputia's back. They slowly reconnect and Kate teaches Norbit how to ride a bike. Deion plans to leave town, having no interest in the orphanage, but the Latimore brothers persuade him to turn it into a strip club. They dupe Norbit and Kate into renewing the restaurant's liquor license in the Latimores' name. Norbit helps Kate rehearse her wedding; a kiss between them makes her have second thoughts about marrying Deion. Rasputia confronts Norbit, having witnessed their kiss, and threatens Kate with acid.

When Kate learns about Deion's plans, she confronts Norbit, who is being imprisoned in the basement by Rasputia, the mastermind of the duplicitous strip club plan. Norbit reluctantly insults Kate to protect her from Rasputia. Heartbroken, Kate leaves and a guilt-ridden Norbit decides to permanently leave town. However, he finds a letter from the private investigator he hired, and discovers Deion has gained $300,000 in divorce settlements from four marriages in the last six years.

The Latimores reveal their plan to Norbit and lock him in the basement again. Norbit escapes on his bicycle, crashes the wedding, officially denounces Rasputia, and informs Kate of Deion's schemes and his own weak-willed treachery. Norbit's evidence is ruined when he falls into a pond, making Rasputia gloat. However, Norbit had contacted three of Deion's ex-wives and their children, all of whom appear, foiling the Latimores' plan and exposing Deion, who now flees.

Angered that their plan is permanently ruined, the Latimore brothers attack Norbit, but the townspeople protect him; having been inspired by his bravery and fed up with their bullying. Rasputia fights her way through the crowd and prepares to kill Norbit, but Mr. Wong harpoons her in the rear, making her flee out of town, followed by her three brothers, who finally accept defeat. Norbit and Kate reconcile, purchase the orphanage, and marry under the same tree where they played as children years ago.

Rasputia and the Latimores are never seen or heard from again. They are rumored to have opened their strip club "El Nipplopolis" in Mexico, where Rasputia becomes their most popular stripper.

== Cast ==
- Eddie Murphy as:
  - Norbit Albert Rice, a shy, nerdy, but likable man
    - Khamani Griffin as Young Norbit (age 5)
    - Austin Reid as Young Norbit (age 10)
    - Jonathan Robinson as Young Norbit (age 17)
  - Rasputia Latimore, Norbit's morbidly obese, sadistic, abusive and tyrannical wife and Big Black Jack, Blue, and Earl's younger sister and boss
    - Lindsey Sims-Lewis as Young Rasputia (age 10)
    - Yves Lola St. Vil as Young Rasputia (age 17)
  - Mr. Hangten Wong, the gruff yet kind-hearted, Chinese owner of the orphanage where Norbit and Kate met as children
- Thandiwe Newton as Kate Thomas, Norbit's childhood best friend, in whom he has had a lifelong romantic interest
  - China Anderson as Young Kate (age 5)
- Cuba Gooding Jr. as Deion Hughes, Kate's fiancé
- Terry Crews as Big Black Jack Latimore, Rasputia's eldest brother and henchman
- Lester "Rasta" Speight as Blue Latimore, Rasputia's second eldest brother and henchman
- Clifton Powell as Earl Latimore, Rasputia's third eldest brother and henchman
- Eddie Griffin as Pope Sweet Jesus, an ex-pimp and Norbit's friend
- Katt Williams as Lord Have Mercy, Pope's sidekick and Norbit's other friend
- Anthony Russell as Sam Giovanni, the Italian owner of Giovanni's
- Floyd Levine as Abe, the tailor
- Michael Colyar as Morris, the barber
- Pat Crawford Brown as Mrs. Henderson, a flower seller
- Jeanette Miller as Mrs. Coleman, an elderly neighbor
- Marlon Wayans as Buster "Bust-A-Move" Perkin, Rasputia's tap dancing instructor with whom Rasputia has an affair
- Richard Gant as The Preacher
- Alexis Rhee as Mrs. Ling Ling Wong, Mr. Wong's wife
- Marianne Muellerleile as Helga, the epilator
- Kristen Schaal as Event Organizer
- John Gatins as Water Park Attendant
- Smith Cho as Deion's Asian wife
- Charlie Murphy (voice) as Lloyd the Dog, Mrs. Henderson's pet Pug dog (misnamed in the end credits as Floyd the Dog)

== Production ==
After the success of Shrek, DreamWorks Pictures co-founder and CEO Jeffrey Katzenberg signed up Eddie Murphy to star in a live-action follow-up, and they were looking for the right film. Norbit seemed like a good fit, a production in line with his tradition of playing multiple characters in a comedy as Murphy had done before with Coming to America and The Nutty Professor. DreamWorks production president Adam Goodman brought the script to director Brian Robbins and he was excited about the prospect of working with Murphy. Norbit was the first of three films where Robbins and Murphy worked together; the other two would be Meet Dave and A Thousand Words. Murphy wrote the story after going on the Internet to see videos "where really large women, African-American women, would beat up their tiny husbands", a concept which he found hilarious. Although Norbit was always intended to be a comedy, early drafts of the script were much darker. According to Thandiwe Newton, during filming, the stand-ins were very convincing, and she frequently filmed scenes with them instead of Murphy.

The various prosthetic makeups, bodysuits, and wigs were created by Rick Baker and his company Cinovation. Baker praised Murphy saying "He really makes the stuff come to life, and he never complains. When we did 'The Nutty Professor' [...], he spent 80-odd days in the makeup chair. As much as I love makeup, even I would have been complaining by the end, but Eddie didn't."

Baker wanted to work from a real life model and auditioned over a hundred extra large ladies, all with the necessary proportions. The model also needed to be able to dance. After several rounds of auditions, one lady was chosen as the life model for Rasputia and a foam latex suit was created based on her measurements. The suit's surface was painted with silicone to make it look like skin. Silicone was also used to make matching gloves. The shape of Murphy's face was changed using foam latex and pieces of silicone, which were then painted over in various tones of red, brown and yellow to create realistic looking skin tone. A body double was used for some scenes, particularly the water park. Murphy with his face in makeup as Rasputia performed against green screen and his head was digitally composited onto the body double.

== Reception ==
=== Critical response ===
On the review aggregator website Rotten Tomatoes, 9% of 122 critics' reviews are positive, with an average rating of 3.6/10. The website's consensus reads: "Coming off his Oscar-nominated performance in Dreamgirls, the talented-but-inconsistent Eddie Murphy plays three roles in Norbit, a cruel, crass, stereotype-filled comedy that's more depressing than funny." Metacritic, which uses a weighted average, assigned the film a score of 27 out of 100, based on 26 critics, indicating "generally unfavorable" reviews. Audiences polled by CinemaScore gave the film a B grade, with under eighteens (28% of those surveyed) giving it a B+ grade.

The film was released in the middle of Oscar voting season, and the overwhelmingly negative reaction is believed to have cost Murphy his Best Supporting Actor Oscar that he was nominated for that year for Dreamgirls (2006), as voters would be hesitant to vote for him after seeing this film. Mick LaSalle of the San Francisco Chronicle gave the movie a positive review, suggesting that Norbit might help Murphy's chances of winning an Oscar for his role in Dreamgirls, saying that his work playing three distinct characters in Norbit is more impressive than anything he did in Dreamgirls. Others suggested it might hurt his chances. Ultimately, Alan Arkin won the award for Best Supporting Actor.

Luke Sader of The Hollywood Reporter called it "Racially insensitive, politically incorrect and beyond crude." Scott Tobias of The A.V. Club gave the film a grade of "F" and wrote: "It probably isn't possible for a single movie to reverse all social progress made since the civil-rights era, but Norbit, the latest broadside from Eddie Murphy, does its best to turn back the clock" and "hideously offensive black stereotypes are merely the tip of the iceberg." Josh Tyler of CinemaBlend gave the movie a mostly negative review, in which he described parts of the film as "pretty despicable" and stated that "the plot relies on the idea that being fat also means you're a horrible bitch." However, he pointed out that "some of it's also kind of sweet. Eddie's really quite good as Norbit, the character is sympathetic and funny. He has a strange sort of perfect chemistry with Thandie Newton, and that's just not something I would have expected."

Liz Braun of Jam! Movies described Norbit as "mostly blubber jokes about how fat Rasputia really is" but said that "the movie is not without genuine laughs. Most of those laughs are generated by the other actors." In regard to the "terrifying" character Rasputia, she went so far as to say that the film "tends to confirm one's worst suspicions about Murphy and what appears to be his general fear and loathing of women. The Rasputia gag gets a little freaky if you think about it too much. And you wouldn't want to dwell on how much Thandie Newton looks like a slender boy in her role as Norbit's true love, either. So don't."

Black activists took issue with Eddie Murphy's portrayal of the character Rasputia, calling Norbit "just the latest [film built] around a black man dressing up as an unsophisticated, overweight black woman." Film critic MaryAnn Johanson said it was a minstrel show and called it a "hideous stew of bigoted 'humor'".

The New Yorker film critic Richard Brody praised Murphy's performances saying "playing multiple roles, Murphy unleashes, with a sense of painful revelation, a tangle of rage, cringing fear, furious power, and a sense of perpetual and unresolved outsiderness." He rated it 17th of 30 top acting performances of the 21st century.

Director Brian Robbins reacted to the negative reviews claiming that "The only films that get good reviews are the ones that nobody sees. I just don't think you can make movies for critics". He also defended his star-driven, high-concept movies’ approach to filmmaking, and praised Murphy's performance, saying that "Eddie Murphy plays three amazingly different characters brilliantly. How could you not praise that? No offense to Alan Arkin, but he couldn't do what Eddie did in 'Norbit.'"

Jim Emerson of RogerEbert.com criticized Robbins' response, comparing his reaction to the “ancient analogy about McDonald's and food critics”. He suggested that Robbins' films "were neither designed for, nor marketed to, people who pay all that much attention to movie critics". Emerson also points out that several of the top-grossing films of 2006 got both good reviews from critics and gained wide audiences.

=== Box office ===
Industry projections expected Norbit to earn about $20 million in its opening weekend, and Paramount was projecting earnings of $25 million. The film opened to $34.2 million in the United States, and was Eddie Murphy's 14th #1 box office opener. The film earned $95.7 million at the North American domestic box office, and $63.6 million in other markets, for a total of $159 million worldwide. The film was released in the United Kingdom on March 9, 2007, and topped the country's box office for the next two weekends, before being overtaken by 300.

=== Accolades ===
Norbit was nominated for eight Golden Raspberry Awards including Worst Picture, and won three awards, all for Eddie Murphy as three different characters. The film was also nominated for an Academy Award for Best Makeup.

Award	Category	Subject	Result
Academy Awards	Best Makeup	Rick Baker and Kazuhiro Tsuji	Nominated
Alliance of Women Film Journalists	Hall of Shame		Won
BET Awards	Best Actor	Eddie Murphy (also for Dreamgirls)	Nominated
Golden Raspberry Awards (2007)	Worst Picture	John Davis, Mike Tollin and Eddie Murphy	Nominated
Golden Raspberry Awards (2007)	Worst Director	Brian Robbins	Nominated
Golden Raspberry Awards (2007)	Worst Actor	Cuba Gooding Jr. (also for Daddy Day Camp)	Nominated
Golden Raspberry Awards (2007)	Worst Actor	Eddie Murphy (as Norbit)	Won
Golden Raspberry Awards (2007)	Worst Supporting Actor	Eddie Murphy (as Mr. Wong)	Won
Golden Raspberry Awards (2007)	Worst Supporting Actress	Eddie Murphy (as Rasputia)	Won
Golden Raspberry Awards (2007)	Worst Screenplay	Jay Scherick, David Ronn, Charlie Murphy and Eddie Murphy	Nominated
Golden Raspberry Awards (2007)	Worst Screen Couple	Eddie Murphy (and either Eddie Murphy or Eddie Murphy)	Nominated
Golden Raspberry Awards (2009)	Worst Actor of the Decade	Eddie Murphy (also for The Adventures of Pluto Nash, I Spy, Imagine That, Meet Dave, and Showtime)	Won
Golden Schmoes Awards	Worst Movie of the Year		Nominated
Kids' Choice Awards	Favorite Male Movie Star	Eddie Murphy	Nominated
Women Film Critics Circle Awards	Most Offensive Male Character	Eddie Murphy (as Rasputia)	Won
Women Film Critics Circle Awards	Hall of Shame	Eddie Murphy (as Rasputia)	Won

== Legacy ==
In a 2025 interview, Murphy expressed his affection for Norbit, saying, "I love Norbit." Despite the film's heavy criticism—including Razzies for Worst Actor, Worst Actress, and Worst Actor of the Decade—Murphy stood by the movie and dismissed the negative backlash. "Come on, that stuff isn't that bad," he remarked. Reflecting on the film's lasting impact, he added, "To this day, I like it. Stuff in Norbit still makes me laugh."

Musician Brian Wilson of The Beach Boys called Norbit his favorite movie in a 2007 interview with Mark Voger for the Asbury Park Press. Voger later wrote about his discovery in 2025 that the exchange had grown into an Internet meme, with fans of Wilson dedicating their reviews of the movie to him in the wake of his death that year and merchandise being sold featuring Wilson in the movie. In response to the claim that Wilson was "trolling" in his response, Voger said that he "believe[d] he meant it 'in the moment.'"

== Soundtrack ==
The soundtrack for Norbit was released on February 6, 2007, by Lakeshore Records.

1. "Standing in the Safety Zone" – The Fairfield Four (2:41)
2. "It's Goin' Down" – Yung Joc (4:03)
3. "You Did" – Kate Earl feat. The Designated Hitters (2:26)
4. "Sexual Healing" – Marvin Gaye
5. "I Only Want to Be with You" – Dusty Springfield (2:37)
6. "Milkshake" – Kelis (3:04)
7. "Shoppin' for Clothes" – The Coasters (2:58)
8. "Walk It Out" – Unk (2:54)
9. "Looking for You" – Kirk Franklin (4:06)
10. "Sweet Honey" – Slightly Stoopid (3:52)
11. "The Hands of Time" – Perfect Circle (6:19)
12. "Young Norbit" – David Newman (3:33)
13. "Queen of Whores" – David Newman (:46)
14. "Kate Returns"/"Tuesday, Tuesday" – David Newman (3:24)
15. "Norbit Sneaks Out" – David Newman (:33)
16. "Rasputia's Fury" – David Newman (1:44)
17. "Norbit and Kate" – David Newman (:55)

Several songs were used in the film which do not appear on the soundtrack album, in order of appearance:

- "You Are the Woman", performed by Firefall
- "(Your Love Keeps Lifting Me) Higher and Higher", performed by Jackie Wilson
- "Dem Jeans", performed by Chingy
- "Chain Hang Low", performed by Jibbs
- "Don't Cha", performed by The Pussycat Dolls
- "Ride of the Valkyries" by Richard Wagner
- "Temperature", performed by Sean Paul

The song "Tonight, I Celebrate My Love" is sung at Norbit and Rasputia's wedding party, but likewise does not appear on the soundtrack album. In addition, the Peter Gabriel song "Big Time" appears in TV spots and in a karaoke version sung by Rasputia during the dance off scene but like the former, also does not appear on the soundtrack album.

== Home media ==
Norbit was released on Blu-ray Disc, DVD, and HD DVD on June 5, 2007, by DreamWorks Home Entertainment.
