= Joseph E. Irenas =

American judge (1940–2015)

Joseph Eron Irenas

Senior Judge of the United States District Court for the District of New Jersey
- In office July 1, 2002 – October 16, 2015

Judge of the United States District Court for the District of New Jersey
- In office April 13, 1992 – July 1, 2002
- Appointed by: George H. W. Bush
- Preceded by: Seat established by 104 Stat. 5089
- Succeeded by: Robert B. Kugler

Personal details
- Born: Joseph Eron Irenas; July 13, 1940 Newark, New Jersey, U.S.
- Died: October 16, 2015 (aged 75) Camden, New Jersey, U.S.
- Spouse: Nancy Jacknow (m. 1962)
- Children: 2
- Education: Princeton University (AB); Harvard Law School (JD)

Joseph Eron Irenas (July 13, 1940 – October 16, 2015) was a United States district judge of the United States District Court for the District of New Jersey.

== Education and career ==
Born in Newark, New Jersey, Irenas received an Artium Baccalaureus degree from Princeton University in 1962 and a Juris Doctor from Harvard Law School in 1965, where he graduated cum laude. He was in private practice of law at McCarter & English in Newark from 1966 to 1992. He was also an adjunct professor at Rutgers University from 1985 to 1986, and again from 1988 to 2015.

== Federal judicial service ==
On November 14, 1991, Irenas was nominated by President George H. W. Bush to a new seat on the United States District Court for the District of New Jersey created by 104 Stat. 5089. He was confirmed by the United States Senate on April 8, 1992, and received his commission on April 13, 1992. He assumed senior status on July 1, 2002 due to a certified disability.

== Personal life and death ==
In 1962, Irenas married Nancy Jacknow; they had two children. In or around 2000, Irenas was diagnosed with kidney failure, but continued to hear cases up until his death.

On October 14, 2015, Irenas fell and hit his head during work at the Mitchell H. Cohen United States Courthouse in Camden, New Jersey. He was taken to Camden's Cooper University Hospital, where he died on October 16, at the age of 75.

== Sources ==
Legal offices
Preceded by Seat established by 104 Stat. 5089	Judge of the United States District Court for the District of New Jersey; 1992–2002	Succeeded by Robert B. Kugler
