= Eleonore Pameijer =

Dutch musician (born 1960)

Eleonore Pameijer (born 1960) is a Dutch flute player.

She studied with Koos Verheul at the Conservatorium van Amsterdam, where she received her solo diploma cum laude. She continued her studies with Abbie de Quant (Utrecht, the Netherlands) and with Sue Ann Kahn at Bennington College (Vermont, U.S.A.), also following master classes with Julius Baker, Samuel Baron and French flutist Marcel Moyse. After returning to Europe, she studied with Severino Gazzelloni at the Academia Chigiana (Italy). She followed special courses for Baroque Music with Jos van Immerseel, Bart Kuyken and Ton Koopman.

Pameijer gave her debut recital in the Amsterdam Concertgebouw and was a prize winner of the Frank Martin competition. In 1985, she became principal flutist of the ASKO/Schönberg-ensemble, a 20th-century music ensembles in Europe.

Pameijer has performed as soloist with various orchestras and ensembles. She has worked with conductors David Porcelijn, Arthuro Tamayo, Richard Dufallo, Ton Koopman, Oliver Knussen, Jaap van Zweden, Kenneth Montgomery, Ingo Metzmacher, Peter Eötvös, Philippe Entremont and Alexander Vedernikov. She has also given performances of chamber music written by composers such as Bach, Telemann, Mozart, Beethoven, Debussy, Steven Mackey and Isang Yun.

Several compositions have been written especially for Pameijer, including flute concertos by Jeff Hamburg (US), Peter Schat (NL), Joep Straesser (NL), Vanessa Lann (US), Peter van Onna (NL), Joost Kleppe (NL), Paul Termos (NL) and Guus Janssen (NL). Dutch publishing house Donemus published two books with solo flute repertoire all composed for Pameijer.

Presently, Pameijer is the artistic director of the Leo Smit Foundation, an organisation which has a goal of rediscovering suppressed and forgotten composers in the Netherlands.

== Selected recordings ==
- Flute and Gamba - Eleonore Pameijer & Ralph Rousseau 2017.
- Romances – French Flute Sonatas (Pameijer, flute and Frans van Ruth, piano)
- Reveries – French Impressionism (Pameijer, flute and Frans van Ruth, piano)
- Treasures – Rediscovered jewels by suppressed Jewish composers (Pameijer, flute and Marcel Worms, piano)
- Lowlands – Dutch Flute Sonatas (Pameijer, flute and Frans van Ruth, piano)
- Between Danube and Volga – Eastern European Flute Sonatas (Pameijer, flute and Marianne Boer, piano)
- From Italy – Italian Virtuosi performed on authentic 19th century instruments (Pameijer, flute and Dario Macaluso, guitar)
- Spanning the Globe – Music From Six Continents, recorded in celebration of the 60th anniversary of UNESCO (Pameijer, flute and Marcel Worms, piano)
- Reprise – Compositions from the Netherlands written for the Duo Barwahser-Berghout, on their original instruments (Pameijer, flute and Erika Waardenburg, harp)
