= DJK Würzburg =

- Founded: 16 September 1920; 104 years ago
- Location: Würzburg, Germany
- Website: www.djk-wuerzburg-basketball.de
Home

Deutsche Jugendkraft Würzburg, commonly known as DJK Würzburg, is a German sports club. It is most known for its basketball section, which in the past had a professional team. Its best known former player is Dirk Nowitzki.

Currently, the sports club contains around 3,000 amateur players.

== History ==
The DJK Sport Association was founded on September 16, 1920 in Würzburg. Due to the geographic location of its home office, the DJK soon founded a local club in Würzburg. However, the different athletic departments found themselves divided among various Catholic clubs. During the Third Reich, all Nazi Germany DJK affiliates were banned by the government. After World War II, the DJK consolidated all of its local departments into DJK Würzburg. Today the club has over 3000 members, including a variety of non-Catholic members.

During the 1960s, the club's track and field athletes saw success at both national and international levels. The club expanded in the 1970s and 80s to include volleyball and tennis. Meanwhile, the club's top women's handball team played in the Handball-Bundesliga Frauen, the top flight of women's handball in Germany, from 1976 to 1985, during the 1987–88 season and from 1993 to 1995.

The club's basketball department gained fame in the 1990s as both the men's and women's teams qualified for the top German Basketball Bundesliga (BBL) division. The women's team played many years in the first and second divisions and was crowned German Champion in 1993. In 1989, the men's team made the jump into the second division. In 1997, featuring Dirk Nowitzki in the line-up, DJK Würzburg claimed the 2nd Division South title, qualifying for the Basketball Bundesliga. In 2001, DJK spun off its men's basketball team into a private corporate entity, now known as s.Oliver Würzburg, to capitalize on their growth as a professional basketball team. DJK Würzburg has produced numerous players who have gone on to have success in the BBL, with the senior men's German national basketball team and, for Nowitzki, the NBA.

In 2005, the club resigned its spot in the BBL and the club stopped competing.

== Honours ==
=== Basketball ===
2. Basketball Bundesliga

- Champions: 1997-98

== Notable players ==
=== Basketball ===
- (Germany) Dirk Nowitzki
- (Germany) Denis Wucherer
- (Nigeria) Olumide Oyedeji
- (United States) Nick Katsikis
- (United States) Robert Garrett
- (United States) Lamont Mack
