= Cherry Hill Public Schools =

School district in Camden County, New Jersey, US

Address
- 45 Ranoldo Terrace Cherry Hill, Camden County, New Jersey, 08034; United States
- Coordinates: 39.907192°N 75.001258°W

District information
- Grades: PreK to 12
- Superintendent: Kwame Morton
- Business administrator: Jason Schimpf
- Schools: 18

Students and staff
- Enrollment: 10,772 (as of 2023–24)
- Faculty: 882.1 FTEs
- Student–teacher ratio: 12.2:1

Other information
- District Factor Group: GH
- Website: www.chclc.org
Ind.	Per pupil	District spending	Rank (*)	K-12 average	%± vs. average
1A	Total Spending	$17,276	32	$18,891	−8.5%
1	Budgetary Cost	13,322	30	14,783	−9.9%
2	Classroom Instruction	8,396	38	8,763	−4.2%
6	Support Services	2,073	38	2,392	−13.3%
8	Administrative Cost	1,359	33	1,485	−8.5%
10	Operations & Maintenance	1,229	12	1,783	−31.1%
13	Extracurricular Activities	261	58	268	−2.6%
16	Median Teacher Salary	63,865	48	64,043
Data from NJDoE 2014 Taxpayers' Guide to Education Spending. *Of K-12 districts with more than 3,500 students. Lowest spending=1; Highest=103

The Cherry Hill Public Schools are a comprehensive community public school district, serving students in pre-kindergarten through twelfth grade from Cherry Hill, in Camden County, in the U.S. state of New Jersey.

As of the 2023–24 school year, the district, comprised of 19 schools (reduced to 18 for 2024–25), had an enrollment of 10,772 students and 882.1 classroom teachers (on an FTE basis), for a student–teacher ratio of 12.2:1. It was the state's twelfth-largest school district in 2011 and is one of the largest suburban districts.

== History ==
In May 1954, with enrollment exceeding the school's target of 1,000, the Haddonfield Public Schools notified the Delaware Township School District (since renamed as the Cherry Hill Public Schools) that its students would no longer be accepted at Haddonfield Memorial High School after June 1956. While there were 420 Haddonfield students at the high school, there were a total of 760 students as part of sending/receiving relationships, including about 200 from Delaware Township (now Cherry Hill).

Constructed on a 40-acre (16 ha) plot of land, Delaware Township High School (since renamed as the Cherry Hill High School West) opened in September 1956 for students in grades 7–9. Completed at a cost of $1.6 million (equivalent to $18.3 million in 2025), dedication ceremonies were conducted in November 1957 for the complex, which was built in four separate sections.

Due to delays in the construction of the new school building, the entering class of 450 students at Cherry Hill East began the 1966–67 school year attending split sessions at the original Cherry Hill High School building. Constructed at a cost of $4 million (equivalent to $39.7 million in 2025), the school building opened in January 1967 as the township's second high school facility. The district's original secondary school, which had been renamed as Cherry Hill High School, became Cherry Hill High School West.

The district had been classified by the New Jersey Department of Education as being in District Factor Group "GH", the third-highest of eight groupings. District Factor Groups organize districts statewide to allow comparison by common socioeconomic characteristics of the local districts. From lowest socioeconomic status to highest, the categories are A, B, CD, DE, FG, GH, I and J.

Starting in the 2024-25 school year, the Cherry Hill Alternative High School was moved from the Lewis Administration Building and renamed as Coles High School Program, operated as a school-within-a-school at Cherry Hill High School East.

== Awards and recognition ==
For the 2001–2002 school year, Cherry Hill High School East received the National Blue Ribbon Award of Excellence from the United States Department of Education, the highest honor that an American school can achieve. During the 2009–10 school year, Rosa International Middle School was awarded the Blue Ribbon School Award of Excellence. Joseph D. Sharp Elementary School was honored by the National Blue Ribbon Schools Program in 2019, one of nine schools in the state recognized as Exemplary High Performing Schools.

Three of the district's schools have been named as "Star Schools" by the New Jersey Department of Education, the highest honor that a New Jersey school can achieve. Cherry Hill High School East was recognized for the 1999–2000 school year, Thomas Paine Elementary School in 2002-2003 and Clara Barton Elementary School was honored with this award in 2003–2004.

Joyce Kilmer and Thomas Paine Elementary Schools were recognized by Governor Jim McGreevey in 2003 as two of 25 schools selected statewide for the First Annual Governor's School of Excellence award.

In addition, the district has three New Jersey Department of Education Governor's Schools of Excellence, and five Best Practices Award Winners. SAT scores far exceed state and national averages. In 2005, the graduation rate was nearly 100% and more than 97% of graduates are continuing their education at two- or four-year colleges.

== Controversy ==
In April 2012, the parent of an autistic student released a video as evidence that his son was the subject of emotional abuse by an aide at Horace Mann Elementary School. The parent had wired his son before sending him to school and told reporters that "he caught his son's teachers gossiping, talking about alcohol and violently yelling at students", which led to one of the aides involved being fired after officials listened to the tape.

== Cherry Hill Education Foundation ==
Along with awards and honors of the school district, the Cherry Hill Education Foundation was established in 1998. The Cherry Hill Education Foundation is an all volunteer, non-profit organization that helps support innovative and educational programs in the Cherry Hill School District that cannot be funded by the District Budget. Since November 2007, the Foundation has funded over $207,000 in grants to various schools throughout the district. The Cherry Hill Education Foundation raises funds from individuals, public and private grants, and corporate sponsorships, and by hosting a variety of fundraising events.

The Cherry Hill Education Foundation is an all volunteer organization that was founded in 1998 as a non-profit organization and has raised over $200,000 to aid schools since 2007. The foundation is a 501(c)(3) non-profit that has a primary mission to support the Cherry Hill School District and to encourage community involvement and awareness of the schools, the students, and student programs. The foundation aims to recognize the accomplishments of the district, the students, the teachers, and the community. Since 1998, the foundation has had three objectives:

1. To promote student development through enriched programs and activities, and recognition of student accomplishments.
2. To encourage creativity among employees by supporting unique growth opportunities, providing resources for creative teaching ideas, and recognizing employee accomplishments.
3. To encourage school-community partnerships by promoting community awareness about school programs, providing ways for individuals and organizations to share resources with the school to enhance learning, and facilitating cooperative ventures among the foundation, community groups, and the school district.

== Schools ==
Schools in the district (with 2023–24 enrollment data from the National Center for Education Statistics) are:

Early childhood

- Joyce Kilmer Preschool
  - Violeta Katsikis, District Supervisor of Preschool and ESL
- Estelle V. Malberg Early Childhood Center (with 201 students; in PreK)
  - Danyelle Edwards, principal

Elementary schools

- Clara Barton Elementary School (507; K–5)
  - Idalis Kizee, principal
- James F. Cooper Elementary School (266; K–5)
  - Rebecca J. Tiernan, principal
- Bret Harte Elementary School (359; K–5)
  - Dumar Burgess, principal
- James H. Johnson Elementary School (441; K–5)
  - Lauren Giordano, principal
- Joyce Kilmer Elementary School (405; K–5)
  - Sean Sweeney, principal
- Kingston Elementary School (406; K–5)
  - William Marble, principal
- A. Russell Knight Elementary School (431; K–5)
  - Eugene Park, principal
- Horace Mann Elementary School (271; K–5)
  - Jonathan Cohen, principal
- Thomas Paine Elementary School (335; K–5)
  - Melissa Gleason, principal
- Joseph D. Sharp Elementary School (449; K–5)
  - Ric Miscioscia, principal
- Richard Stockton Elementary School (360; K–5)
  - Haritha Tottempudi, principal
- Woodcrest Elementary School (358; K–5)
  - Alison McCartney, principal

Middle schools

- Henry C. Beck Middle School (806; 6–8)
  - Nysheria Sims, principal
- John A. Carusi Middle School (884; 6–8)
  - Christina Collazo-Franco, principal
- Rosa International Middle School (753; 6–8)
  - John Cafagna, principal

High schools

- Cherry Hill High School East (2,093; 9–12)
  - Neil Burti, acting principal
- Cherry Hill High School West (1,304; 9–12)
  - John Burns, principal
- Coles High School Program (32; 9–12)
  - Aaron Edwards, principal

== Administration ==
Core members of the district's administration are:

- Kwame Morton, superintendent
- Jason Schimpf, assistant superintendent, business administrator and board secretary

== Board of education ==
The district's board of education is comprised of nine members who set policy and oversee the fiscal and educational operation of the district through its administration. As a Type II school district, the board's trustees are elected directly by voters to serve three-year terms of office on a staggered basis, with three seats up for election each year held (since 2012) as part of the November general election. The board appoints a superintendent to oversee the district's day-to-day operations and a business administrator to supervise the business functions of the district.

For the 2025-26 school year, the board of education members are:

- Gina Winters, Board President
- Adam Greenbaum, Board Vice President
- Kurt Braddock
- Renee Cherfane
- Candi Cummings
- Dean Drizin
- Melissa Manzano
- Bridget Palmer
- Miriam Stern
