= Paul Lisicky =

American novelist and memoirist (born 1959)

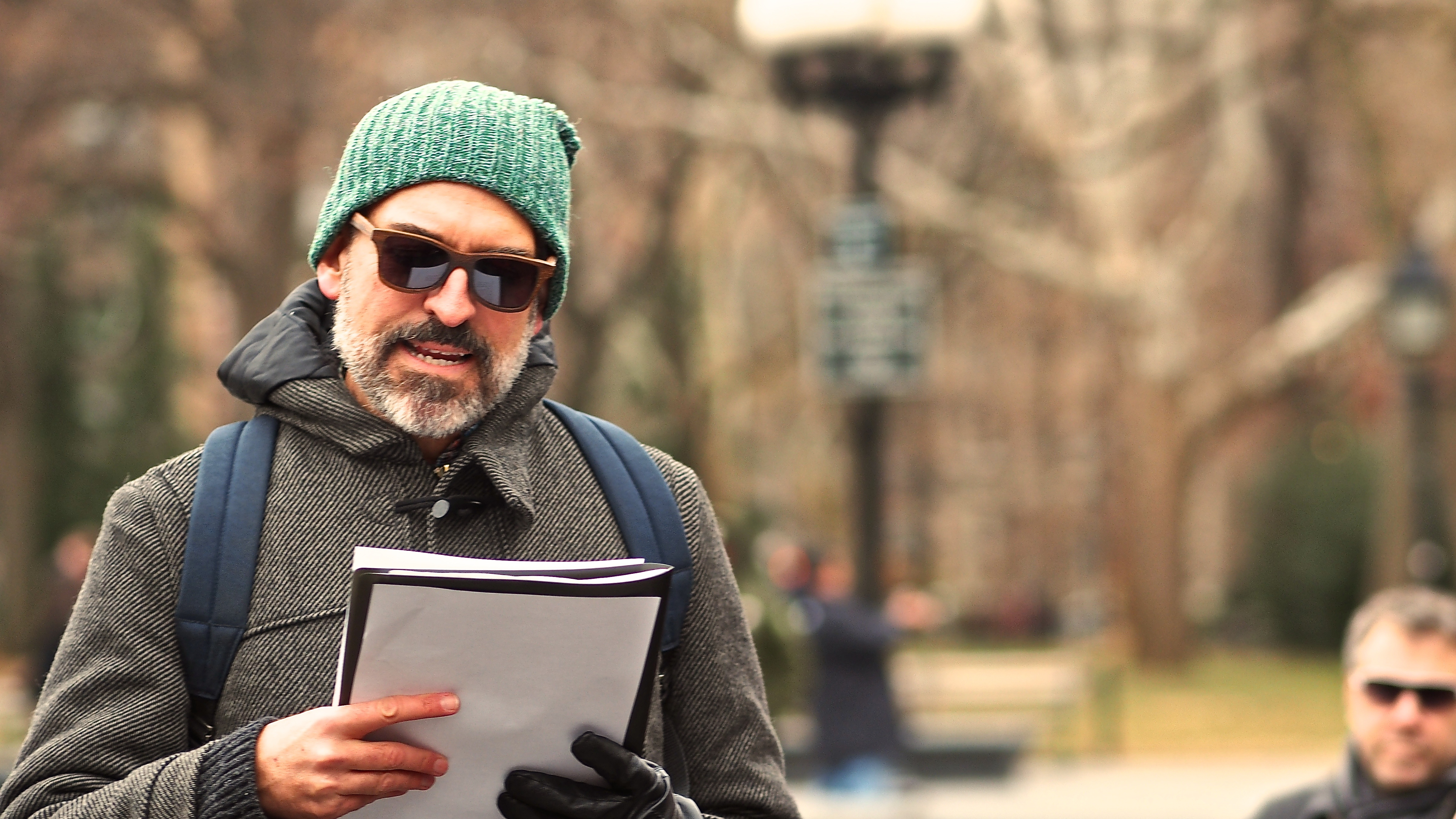
- Lisicky in 2014
- Born: July 9, 1959 (age 67)
- Education: Rutgers University–Camden (MA); Iowa Writers' Workshop (MFA
- Occupation: Author
- Employer: Rutgers University–Camden

Paul Lisicky (born July 9, 1959) is an American novelist and memoirist. He is the author of seven books, including Lawnboy (1999), Famous Builder (2002), The Burning House (2011), Unbuilt Projects (2012), The Narrow Door: A Memoir of Friendship (2016), Later: My Life at the Edge of the World (2020), and Song So Wild and Blue: A Life with the Music of Joni Mitchell (2025). His forthcoming book, Among: In the Company of My Teachers, is scheduled for publication by HarperOne. In 2026, Lisicky joined the nonfiction faculty of the Bennington Writing Seminars.

== Early life and education ==
Lisicky was born on July 9, 1959. He grew up in Cherry Hill, New Jersey, and graduated from Cherry Hill High School East. He graduated from Rutgers University–New Brunswick, earned an MA from Rutgers University–Camden and an MFA from the Iowa Writers' Workshop.

Lisicky's early interests included music as well as literature. His memoir Song So Wild and Blue examines the influence of Joni Mitchell's music on his life and his development as a writer. Lisicky began as an aspiring songwriter before turning toward fiction, a transition he discusses in the book.

== Career ==
Lisicky's first novel, Lawnboy, was published in 1999 by Turtle Point Press and was subsequently reissued by Graywolf Press. The novel concerns a young gay man coming of age and was a finalist for the 2000 Stonewall Book Award.

His second book, Famous Builder (2002), was a memoir. The book draws on Lisicky's childhood in southern New Jersey and his fascination with houses, housing developments, and the idea of becoming a builder. His subsequent fiction included The Burning House (2011), while Unbuilt Projects (2012) brought together short prose crossing the boundaries of fiction and nonfiction.

Lisicky's writing has appeared in The Atlantic, Conjunctions, The Cut, Fence, The New York Times, Ploughshares, Tin House, and other publications. His honors and fellowships include awards or fellowships from the John Simon Guggenheim Memorial Foundation, the National Endowment for the Arts, the James Michener/Copernicus Society, the Fine Arts Work Center in Provincetown, and the Rose Dorothea Award from the Provincetown Public Library.

Lisicky has taught creative writing at Cornell University, New York University, Sarah Lawrence College, the University of Texas at Austin, and Rutgers University–Camden. He was a member of the faculty of the Bread Loaf Writers' Conference in 2022 and 2024 and returned to the conference as faculty in 2026. Lisicky served as editor of the literary journal StoryQuarterly from 2012 through 2026. The journal is published by Rutgers University–Camden.

In 2021, Paul Lisicky appeared on Storybound reading an excerpt from Later : My Life at the Edge of the World, with music sampled from Jordan Warmack.

== The Narrow Door ==
The Narrow Door: A Memoir of Friendship was published by Graywolf Press in 2016. The memoir concerns Lisicky's friendship with the writer Denise Gess, who died of cancer, and the dissolution of a long-term romantic relationship.

The book uses an associative, non-chronological structure to move among memories of friendship, love, grief, and artistic life. The Los Angeles Times described it as a work of memories arranged out of order and characterized by an accumulation of personal memories and relationships.

The memoir explores the relationship between friendship and artistic ambition as well as the experience of illness, death, grief, and loss. Reviews in The New York Times, The Los Angeles Times, The Chicago Tribune, The Boston Globe, and other publications drew attention to the book's treatment of friendship and intimate relationships between writers.

The Narrow Door was selected as a New York Times Editors' Choice and was a finalist for the Randy Shilts Award for Gay Nonfiction, presented by the Publishing Triangle.

== Provincetown and Later ==
Lisicky was a writing fellow at the Fine Arts Work Center in Provincetown, Massachusetts, in the early 1990s and later served on the organization's Writing Committee.

His experience in Provincetown became the basis for Later: My Life at the Edge of the World, published by Graywolf Press in 2020.

The memoir recounts his experience in Provincetown during the early 1990s, amid the AIDS epidemic, and portrays the town's artistic and gay communities alongside experiences of illness, grief, friendship, sexuality, and artistic development.

Later combines personal recollection with a portrait of a particular community and historical period. Its episodic and fragmented structure reflects Lisicky's approach to memory and his effort to evoke the experience of living through the AIDS epidemic rather than reconstructing it solely as retrospective history.

Later was selected as one of NPR's Books We Love of 2020. The book received critical attention from publications including The New York Times, The Washington Post, the Los Angeles Times, the Los Angeles Review of Books, Kirkus Reviews, and Booklist.

== Song So Wild and Blue ==
Song So Wild and Blue: A Life with the Music of Joni Mitchell was published by HarperOne in 2025.

The book combines memoir with an examination of Joni Mitchell's music and its influence on Lisicky's life and development as a writer.

Rather than presenting a conventional biography of Mitchell, Lisicky uses her music as a framework through which to examine his own artistic development, relationships, sexuality, and understanding of the creative life. The book traces his early encounter with Mitchell's music and his development from an aspiring songwriter into a fiction writer and memoirist.

The book received starred reviews from Kirkus Reviews and Booklist.

Reviews in The New York Times Book Review, The Washington Post, the Los Angeles Times, and other publications discussed the book's combination of memoir, literary criticism, and reflection on artistic influence.

Song So Wild and Blue was selected as one of NPR's Books We Love of 2025.

== Among: In the Company of My Teachers ==
Lisicky's forthcoming book, Among: In the Company of My Teachers, is scheduled for publication by HarperOne. The book continues Lisicky's interest in artistic formation and the influence of teachers, writers, and other artists on his development.

== Teaching and editorial work ==
Lisicky has taught creative writing at Cornell University, New York University, Sarah Lawrence College, the University of Texas at Austin, and Rutgers University–Camden.

He was a member of the faculty of the Bread Loaf Writers' Conference in 2022 and 2024 and returned to the conference as faculty in 2026. The Bread Loaf Writers' Conference, operated by Middlebury College, brings together writers for workshops, lectures, readings, and other literary programming.

Middlebury's conference records document Lisicky's participation at the conference, including appearances in 2024 and 2026.

Lisicky served as editor of the literary journal StoryQuarterly from 2012 through 2026. The journal is published by Rutgers University–Camden.

In 2026, Lisicky joined the faculty of the Bennington Writing Seminars as a nonfiction writer and teacher.

== Awards and honors ==
Lisicky's honors include fellowships from the John Simon Guggenheim Memorial Foundation, the National Endowment for the Arts, the James Michener/Copernicus Society, and the Fine Arts Work Center in Provincetown.

He has also received the Rose Dorothea Award from the Provincetown Public Library.

Lawnboy was a finalist for the 2000 Stonewall Book Award.

Unbuilt Projects was a finalist for a Lambda Literary Award.

The Narrow Door was a finalist for the Randy Shilts Award for Gay Nonfiction and was selected as a New York Times Editors' Choice.

Later was selected for NPR's Books We Love in 2020, and Song So Wild and Blue was selected for the 2025 list.

== Personal life ==
Lisicky has a long-standing connection to Provincetown, Massachusetts, where he was a fellow at the Fine Arts Work Center and which became the setting for Later.

From 1995 until 2011, his partner was the writer Mark Doty. They were married in 2008 and divorced in 2013. Their relationship and its dissolution are described in The Narrow Door.

Lisicky divides his time between Brooklyn and southern Louisiana, according to a 2026 biographical profile.

== See also ==
- Literary analysis
- LGBT culture in New York City
- List of LGBT people from New York City
- NYC Pride March
