= Christine O'Hearn =

American judge (born 1969)

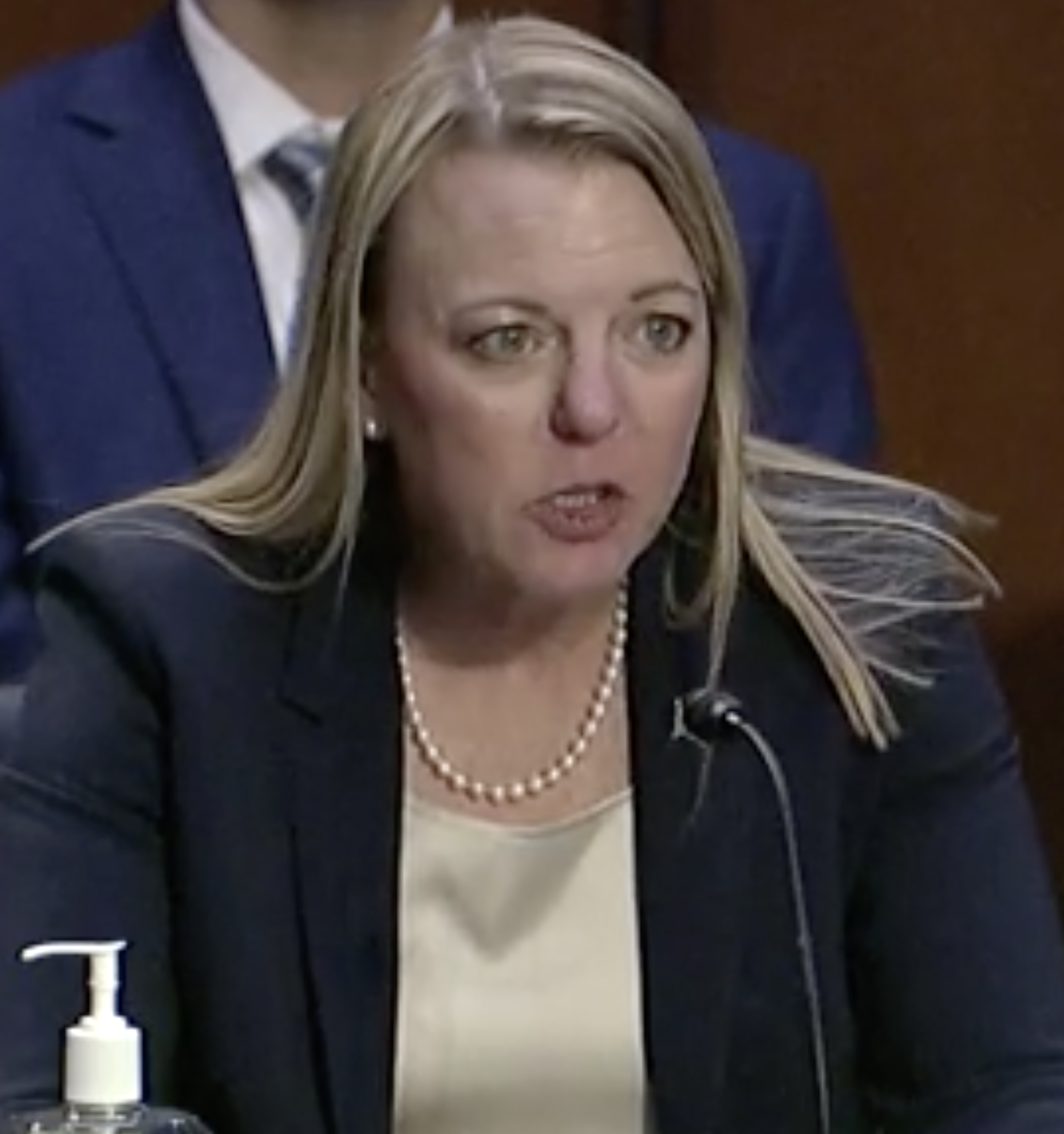

Judge of the United States District Court for the District of New Jersey
- Incumbent
- Assumed office October 22, 2021
- Appointed by: Joe Biden
- Preceded by: Robert B. Kugler

Personal details
- Born: Christine Patricia McCall; 1969 (age 56–57) Camden, New Jersey, U.S.
- Education: University of Delaware (BA); Temple University (JD)

Christine Patricia O'Hearn (née Christine Patricia McCall, born 1969) is an American lawyer serving as a United States district judge of the United States District Court for the District of New Jersey.

== Education ==
Raised in the Marlton section of Evesham Township, New Jersey, O'Hearn graduated from Cherokee High School in 1987. She received a Bachelor of Arts degree from the University of Delaware in 1990 and a Juris Doctor from the Temple University Beasley School of Law in 1993.

== Career ==
O'Hearn was a partner at the law firm of Brown & Connery LLP in Haddonfield, New Jersey from 1993 to 2021. From 2006 to 2007, O'Hearn was an adjunct professor at the Rutgers University School of Law. She is a fellow of the American College of Trial Lawyers.

In 2007, she represented Gloucester County Institute of Technology against allegations that a teenage student had been abused by her swim coach for six years.

In 2011, she defended Gloucester Township Public Schools against multiple claims of alleged pervasive and persistent racism.

In 2012, O'Hearn defended the borough of Pine Hill, New Jersey, against allegations that an employee had been sexually harassed by the mayor.

O'Hearn's political contributions have all been to Democrats, including U.S. Senator Bob Menendez and former U.S. Rep. Rob Andrews.

=== Federal judicial service ===
On April 29, 2021, President Joe Biden nominated O'Hearn to serve as a United States district judge for the United States District Court for the District of New Jersey to the seat vacated by Judge Robert B. Kugler, who assumed senior status on November 2, 2018. O'Hearn was recommended by Senator Robert Menendez. Her nomination was criticized by some progressives, including the magazine The American Prospect, which said that she had "fought against workplace sexual harassment cases, defended police departments, and represented management during union drives." On June 23, 2021, a hearing on her nomination was held before the Senate Judiciary Committee. On July 22, 2021, her nomination was reported out of committee by a 12–10 vote. On October 19, 2021, the United States Senate invoked cloture on her nomination by a 53–44 vote. Her nomination was confirmed later that day by a 53–44 vote. She received her judicial commission on October 22, 2021.

== See also ==
- Joe Biden judicial appointment controversies

Legal offices
Preceded by Robert B. Kugler	Judge of the United States District Court for the District of New Jersey; 2021–present	Incumbent
