= Nick Katsikis =

Greek–American basketball player

Personal information
- Born: March 12, 1967 (age 59) New Jersey, United States
- Listed height: 6 ft 6.74 in (2.00 m)

Career information
- High school: Cherry Hill High School East (1982–1986)
- College: Seton Hall University (1986–1989)
- Playing career: 1990–2000
- Position: Small forward

Career history
- 1990–1993: PAOK
- 1993–1996: Dafni
- 1997–1998: Namika Lahti
- 1999–2000: DJK Würzburg

Career highlights
- Greek League champion (1992)

Nikos "Nick" Katsikis (Greek: Νίκος "Νικ" Κατσίκης; born March 12, 1967) is a former Greek–American professional basketball player. His twin brother Tom Katsikis is also a former professional basketball player.

== High school ==
The Katsikis brothers grew up in Cherry Hill, New Jersey and played basketball at Cherry Hill High School East from 1982 to 1986. Nick scored more than 1,500 points in these four years, averaging 20.4 points per game. Moreover, he is the all-time school leader in rebounds (743), field goals (697) and steals (214). On 22 November 2015, the Katsikis brothers became members of the Cherry Hill High School East Hall of Fame.

== College career ==
Katsikis played with the Seton Hall Pirates men's basketball team for three years. His college career scoring record was 21 points against Providence, on 20 January 1988. He also, had four 3-point field goals in five attempts. Katsikis was member of Pirates team which reached at the 1989 NCAA Division I Men's Basketball Championship Game and lost from Michigan Wolverines men's basketball with 80–79. He played at the semifinal against Duke, and scored three points. Twenty five years after the final, Katsikis said that the foul call at the end of the game was ridiculous and he can't sleep from the inequity.

== Professional career ==
In 1991, Katsikis joined PAOK along with his brother Tom, and played for three years. He won the Greek League in 1992. Katsikis played with PAOK in 22 games and scored 81 points. In 1993 he moved to Dafni.

He also, played with Namika Lahti, and DJK Würzburg.

After, their retirement Nick and Tom Katsikis became owners of their family restaurant in Pennsauken Township, New Jersey.

== Coaching career ==
Katsikis signed with Athletes Untapped as a private basketball coach on Aug 22, 2024.
