= Tom Katsikis =

Greek–American basketball player

Personal information
- Born: March 12, 1967 (age 59) New Jersey, United States
- Listed height: 6 ft 6.74 in (2.00 m)

Career information
- High school: Cherry Hill High School East (1982–1986)
- College: Temple (1986–1988)
- Playing career: 1990–1993
- Position: Small forward

Career history
- 1990–1991: PAOK
- 1991–1992: Dafni
- 1992–1993: Panellinios

Thomas Katsikis (Greek: Τομ Κατσίκης; born March 12, 1967) is a former Greek–American professional basketball player. His twin brother Nick Katsikis is also a former professional basketball player.

== High school ==
Tom and Nick Katsikis played with Cherry Hill High School East from 1982 to 1986. Tom scored more than 1,500 points in these four years having 20.2 points per game, becoming one of only four players who scored more than 1,000 in school history. Along his brother, he led their high school to a 69–15 record. On 22 November 2015, the Katsikis brothers became members of the Cherry Hill High School East Hall of Fame.

== College career ==
Katsikis played with the Temple Owls men's basketball team for two years. He was a member of the team which had a 32–2 record during 1987–88 season and was inducted into the Philadelphia Big 5 Hall of Fame Moreover, Katsikis and his teammates honored from their college on 10 March 2013, twenty five years after their achievement.

== Professional career ==
In 1990, Katsikis signed with PAOK along with his brother Nick Katsikis. They became the first twins who ever played in the Greek Basketball League Tom has only one cap with PAOK and scoring seven points. The next season he joined to Dafni. Katsikis had 18 appearances and scored 139 points. He also played with Panellinios in the Greek A2 Basket League.

After, their retirement Tom and Nick Katsikis became owners of their family restaurant in Pennsauken Township, New Jersey.
