= Sean Killion =

American swimmer (born 1967)

Personal information
- Full name: Sean Thomas Killion
- National team: United States
- Born: October 24, 1967 (age 58) Camden, New Jersey, U.S.
- Height: 6 ft 3 in (1.91 m)
- Weight: 185 lb (84 kg)
- Spouse: Dr. Regan Stuart m. 2005
- Children: 2

Sport
- Sport: Swimming
- Strokes: Freestyle
- Club: Jersey Wahoos
- College team: University of California, Berkeley 1991
- Coach: John Carroll (Wahoos); Nort Thornton (U. Cal)
Medal record
Men's swimming
Representing the United States
Pan Pacific Championships
Silver medal – second place	1987 Brisbane	400 m freestyle
Pan American Games
Gold medal – first place	1991 Havana	400 m freestyle

Sean Thomas Killion (born October 24, 1967) is an American former competition swimmer for the University of California at Berkeley, and a 1991 Havana Pan American Games gold medalist, who represented the United States at the 1992 Summer Olympics in the 400 and 1500-meter freestyle. While a student at U.C. Berkeley on July 27, 1987, Killion set a 15 year standing American record in the 800-meter freestyle with a time of 7:52.49. After his swimming career, he moved to the San Francisco Bay area in the 90's, where he worked in sales for Federal Express and Indeed Inc., later coaching swimming.

== Early swimming ==
Killion was born in Camden, New Jersey, on October 24, 1967 to Tom and Ann Killion, but the family moved to Old Orchard, New Jersey the year Sean was born. At an early age, Killion began early swim training during summers with the nearby Old Orchard Otters. By seven, he started year-round training and age-group competition with Mount Laurel's Jersey Wahoos under long serving Coach John Carroll, a Middle Atlantic Coach of the Year in 1987, and 1992. While swimming for the Wahoos, Killion helped lead the team to top ten finishes in the National Championships in both the Junior and Senior divisions.

Growing up in New Jersey's Cherry Hill, he swam for Cherry Hill High School East under Coach Ira Kosloff, setting New Jersey State Interscholastic Athletic Association records that have stood for as long as 30 years. A 1986 graduate of Cherry Hill, in his Senior year, Killion set records in state competition in the 200 freestyle of 1:39.71 and set a very longstanding record in the 500 freestyle of 4:24.04. During High School, he won the 500 freestyle four consecutive years at the New Jersey State Interscholastic Athletic Association State Championships, and took first in the 200 freestyle as a Senior, Junior and Sophomore. With his consistent record of performance, he was a four-time recipient of All South-Jersey honors. An all-round athlete, he participated in baseball, basketball and soccer besides excelling in swimming.

== U. California at Berkeley ==
Killion received a scholarship to the University of California at Berkeley of the PAC-10 conference, and swam for the team from around 1987-1991, where he was a 13-time Division 1 All-American under Hall of Fame Head Coach Nort Thornton. He graduated Berkeley in 1991. While still a Berkeley student, at the U.S. Long Course Senior National Championships in Fresno, California, Killion set the American record in the 800-meter freestyle with a time of 7:52.49, retaining the record from July 27, 1987, to August 25, 2002. He was only two seconds off the World Record set by the Soviet Union's Vladimir Salnikov, and meet officials considered his time the second fastest ever swam in the event. Killion believed he did not perform up to his ability in his Freshman swimming season at University of California. In a somewhat disappointing year, a case of pneumonia disrupted his training, and he was unable to make the American Olympic team or attend the 1988 Olympic trials.

== International competition ==
Not long after High School graduation, he was a surprise medalist in the July, 1986 Goodwill Games, defeating world record and Olympic gold medalist Vladimir Salnikov, out touching him at the wall, winning two gold medals and a bronze. Killion won three silver medals at the 1990 Goodwill Games. He claimed the gold medal at the 1991 Pan American Games in Havana in the men's 400-meter freestyle event.

== 1992 Olympics ==
At the 1992 Olympic Trials, in a career high point, Killion won the 1,500 freestyle with a personal best time of 15:07.61. After the trials, he trained for Olympic Competition at Team Foxcatcher in Philadelphia's Newton Square, where he averaged over sixty hours in weekly training.

Killion represented the United States at the 1992 Summer Olympics in Barcelona, Spain. He competed in the B Final of the men's 400-meter freestyle, and finished with the eleventh-best overall time of 3:52.76. He also recorded a time of 15:27.49 in the preliminary heats of the men's 1,500-meter freestyle, but did not advance. His time was about 15 seconds behind the bronze medalist from Germany who made the finals. Australians took first and second place in the event, with no Americans in medal contention.

== Later work life and coaching ==
After retiring from high level competitive swimming around 1992, Killion worked as an Assistant swim coach at Rutgers University, near his home town, but after a year decided he had a greater passion for sales. At Rutgers, he worked under Hall of Fame Head Coach Frank Elm. Around 1997, he settled in the Bay Area of California, where he pursued surfing as a hobby, often riding the waves found off Half Moon Bay, twenty-five miles South of San Francisco. In September 2005, he married his wife Regan B. Stuart, a former sprint track athlete at Southern Methodist University who worked as a pediatric physician at Stanford University. The couple had two daughters who participated in swimming as children.

Continuing to swim and compete for health and fitness, Killion participated in United States Masters Swimming, particularly in 1998-99, focusing on his specialty distance freestyle events.

While in the Bay Area, he began work as a sales manager for Federal Express at least through 2005. From around 2012-2023, Killion worked with the Enterprise Sales Team at Indeed Inc. in the San Francisco area, finding professionals jobs, often meeting with large corporations to help in their need to recruit staff. In 2023, in one of his first head coaching assignments, he took a position as the Coach of the Mavericks Swimming Association Club in California's Half Moon Bay. In 2024, the San Francisco area's Olympic Club announced Killion to be their new Junior Swim Team Head Coach, where Killion worked with Bobby Savulich coaching student athletes.

== Honors ==
In his High School Senior year in 1986, he was named a Swimmer of the Year. He is a member of the Camden County (NJ) Hall of Fame, and was part of the inaugural class of the Cherry Hill East Athletic Hall of Fame in 2015. He was also inducted into the New Jersey Interscholastic Swimming Association Hall of Fame.

== See also ==
- List of University of California, Berkeley alumni
