= Leon Rose =

American basketball executive (born 1961)

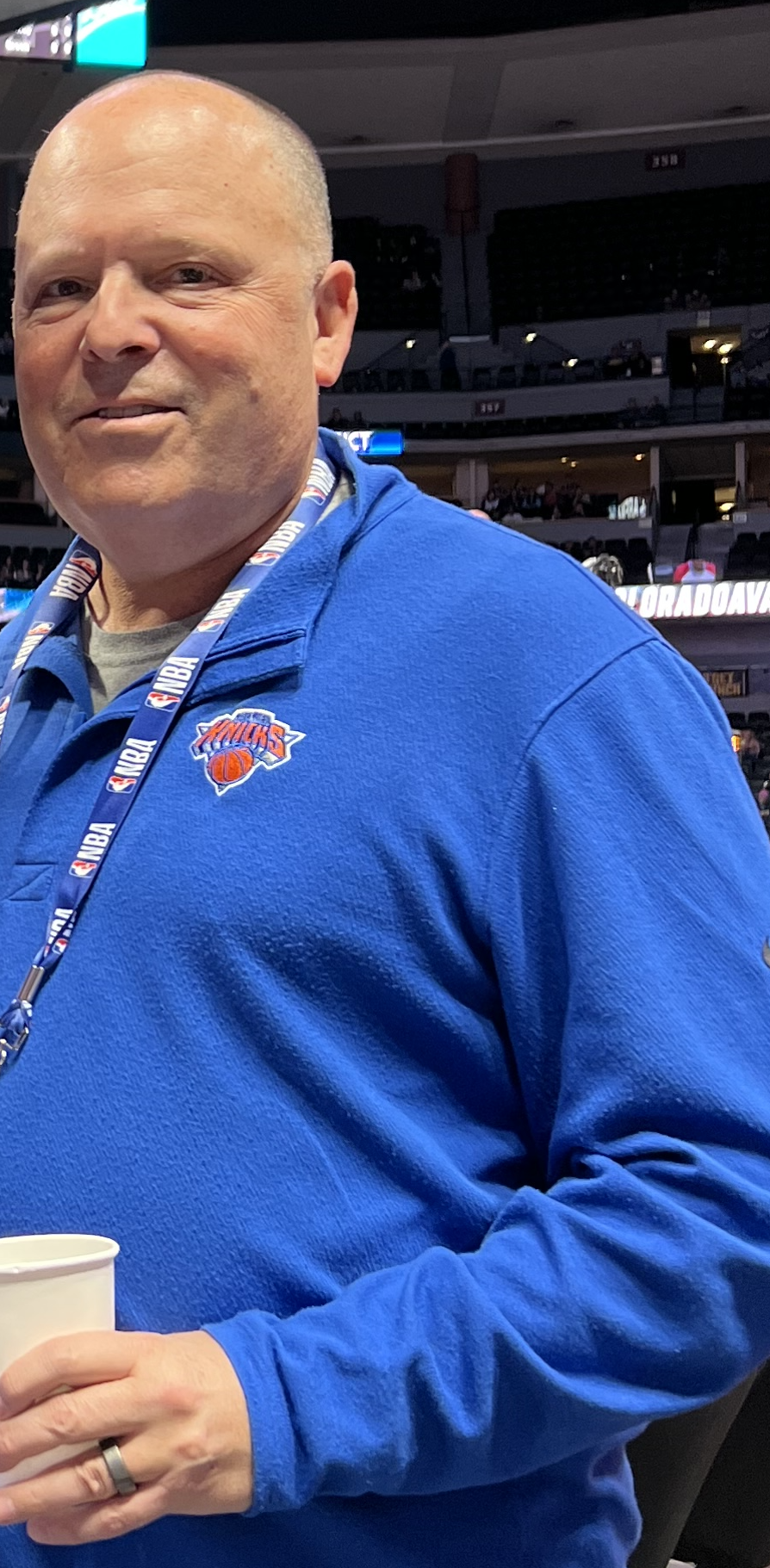

New York Knicks
- Position: President
- League: NBA

Personal information
- Born: March 9, 1961 (age 65) Cherry Hill, New Jersey, U.S.

Career information
- High school: Cherry Hill East (Cherry Hill, New Jersey)
- College: Dickinson (1979–1983)
- Coaching career: 1983–1988

Career history

Coaching
- 1983–1986: Cherry Hill HS East (assistant)
- 1986–1988: Rutgers–Camden (assistant)

Career highlights
- As executive: NBA champion (2026); NBA Cup champion (2025)

Leon Rose (born March 9, 1961) is an American basketball executive, attorney and sports agent. He serves as president of the New York Knicks of the National Basketball Association (NBA), who won an NBA championship in 2026 during his tenure. As a sports agent, Rose represented a number of prominent NBA players, including Allen Iverson and LeBron James.

== Early life ==
Rose grew up in Cherry Hill, New Jersey and attended Cherry Hill High School East, where he played basketball and was later inducted into the school's hall of fame. Rose graduated from Dickinson College, where he played on the basketball team. He earned his J.D. degree at Temple University Beasley School of Law while he worked as an assistant for the Cherry Hill High School East basketball team. From 1986 to 1988, he was an assistant for the Rutgers University–Camden basketball team under his former gym teacher.

Rose was inducted into the Philadelphia Jewish Sports Hall of Fame in 2011.

== Sports agent career ==
Rose represented LeBron James from 2005 until 2012, when James left to join Klutch Sports, led by Rich Paul, who worked under Rose at Creative Artists Agency. Rose and fellow CAA agent Henry Thomas, who at the time represented the Heat's Dwyane Wade and Chris Bosh, worked together to bring the three players together on the Miami Heat in 2010. Rose negotiated a four-year deal for James with Miami. He had previously negotiated a 2006 extension for James with the Cleveland Cavaliers.

== Executive career ==
On March 2, 2020, Rose was named president of the New York Knicks of the National Basketball Association (NBA). Rose orchestrated the Knicks' first NBA championship in 53 years in 2026. He was widely lauded for building the team from scratch without benefit of a high draft pick, instead making trades and signing underappreciated players at the time but which turned out to be key moves to building a champion.

== Clients ==
Rose's previous clients include:

- Carmelo Anthony, forward, Last NBA team: Los Angeles Lakers
- Renaldo Balkman, forward, Last NBA team: New York Knicks, 2010
- Andrea Bargnani, forward/center, Last NBA team: Brooklyn Nets
- Devin Booker, guard, Phoenix Suns
- Omri Casspi, forward, Memphis Grizzlies
- Mardy Collins, guard, Last NBA team: Los Angeles Clippers, 2010
- Eddy Curry, center, Last NBA team: Dallas Mavericks, 2012
- DeSagana Diop, center, Last NBA team: Charlotte Bobcats, 2013
- Joel Embiid, center, Philadelphia 76ers
- Jonny Flynn, guard, Last NBA team: Portland Trail Blazers, 2010
- Richard Hamilton, guard, Retired
- Allen Iverson, guard, Retired
- LeBron James, forward, Los Angeles Lakers
- Eddie Jones, guard, retired
- Michael Kidd-Gilchrist, forward, Dallas Mavericks
- Aaron McKie, guard, Retired
- Victor Oladipo, guard, Miami Heat
- Chris Paul, guard, Retired
- P.J. Tucker, guard, Los Angeles Clippers
- J.R. Smith, guard, Los Angeles Lakers, 2020
- Rodney Stuckey, guard, Retired
- Jonas Valančiūnas, center, New Orleans Pelicans
- Dajuan Wagner, guard, Prokom Trefl Sopot

== Personal life ==
Rose and his wife, Donna, have two children together.

== See also ==
- List of National Basketball Association team presidents
