= Bob Greene (fitness) =

American exercise physiologist

Bob Greene (born December 8, 1958) is an American exercise physiologist and certified personal trainer specializing in fitness, metabolism, and weight loss. Greene is the creator of Best Life, a diet and fitness plan, and Best Life Foods, which sells a line of butter substitutes.

== Biography ==
=== Education ===
Greene was born in Cherry Hill, New Jersey and is a graduate of Cherry Hill High School East.

Greene studied physical education at the University of Delaware and then went on to get a master's degree in exercise physiology from the University of Arizona. He is a member of the American College of Sports Medicine.

=== Career ===
Greene has authored over ten books concerning weight-loss, diet and health, including two books co-authored by Oprah Winfrey. He was a frequent guest on The Oprah Winfrey Show, has a radio show on the "Oprah and Friends" satellite radio network and is a contributor to O. He lives in Santa Barbara, California with his wife, Urania, and their daughter. Winfrey was the "Best Woman" at his 2005 wedding.

== Books ==
- The Life You Want, by Bob Greene, 2010; ISBN 978-1-4165-8836-8.
- Best Life Diet, by Bob Greene, 2006; ISBN 1-4165-4066-0.
- Best Life Diet Daily Journal, by Bob Greene, ISBN 1-4165-4314-7.
- Make the Connection: Ten Steps to a Better Body and a Better Life, by Bob Greene and Oprah Winfrey, 1999; ISBN 0-7868-8298-0.
- A Journal of Daily Renewal: The Companion to Make the Connection, by Bob Greene and Oprah Winfrey, 1996; ISBN 0-7868-8215-8.
- Keep the Connection: Choices for a Better and Healthier Life, by Bob Greene, 2004; ISBN 0-7868-8895-4.
- Get With the Program!: Getting Real About Your Weight, Health, and Emotional Well-Being, by Bob Greene, Sydny Miner (Editor), 2002; ISBN 0-7432-3804-4.
- Get With the Program! Daily Journal, by Bob Greene, 2002; ISBN 0-7432-3834-6.
- Get With the Program! Guide to Good Eating: Great Food for Good Health, by Bob Greene, Bonni Leon-Berman (Designed by), 2003; ISBN 0-7432-4310-2.
- The Get With The Program! Guide to Fast Food and Family Restaurants, by Bob Greene, 2003; ISBN 0-7432-5621-2.
- Bob Greene's Total Body Makeover: An Accelerated Program of Exercise and Nutrition for Maximum Results in Minimum Time, by Bob Greene, 2004; ISBN 0-7432-5405-8.
- The Best Life Guide to Managing Diabetes and Pre-Diabetes
