= Nate Mulberg =

American baseball coach

Current position
- Title: Head Coach
- Team: Johns Hopkins Blue Jays
- Conference: Centennial
- Record: 38–12 (.760)

Biographical details
- Born: January 5, 1992 (age 34); Newton, Massachusetts, U.S.
- Education: University of Rochester '14 (B.A.), Millersville University '16 (M.Ed.), University of Illinois '22 (MBA), University of Richmond '22 (M.NPM.)

Playing career
- 2011-2014: University of Rochester
- Position: Shortstop

Coaching career (HC unless noted)
- 2014-2016: Franklin & Marshall (assistant)
- 2016: Bucknell (assistant)
- 2017-2025: Richmond (assistant)
- 2025 - present: Johns Hopkins

Head coaching record
- Overall: 38–12 (.760)

Accomplishments and honors

Championships
- Division III College World Series Appearance (2026) Division III Super Regional (2026) Division III Regional (2026) Centennial Conference Tournament (2026) Centennial Conference Regular Season (2026)

Awards
- ABCA Region V Coach of the Year (2026), D3Baseball.com Region V Coach of the Year (2026)

Nate Mulberg is an American baseball coach who is the head coach for Johns Hopkins University. He is also a coach for the Israel national baseball team. In college, he played shortstop for the Yellowjackets at the University of Rochester.

== Early and personal life ==
Raised in Cherry Hill, New Jersey, Mulberg played prep baseball at Cherry Hill High School East, where he graduated in 2010. He played baseball for the high school for four years, and ran cross country for two years. After high school, he attended the University of Rochester where he captained the baseball team. He completed a Master of Education from Millersville University in 2016, a Master of Business Administration (MBA) from the University of Illinois Urbana-Champaign in 2022, and a Master of Non-Profit Management from the University of Richmond in 2022. Mulberg now lives in Baltimore, Maryland with his wife, Kristen Litchfield Mulberg, and daughter.

== College playing career ==
Mulberg was a four-year starting shortstop for the Yellowjackets at the University of Rochester ('14), where he studied English and Business. He graduated cum laude and Phi Beta Kappa. He is in the top 10 in school history in sacrifice hits, assists, double plays turned, and most times hit by a pitch. He is a two-time CoSIDA First Team Academic All-District selection, and a three-time Liberty League/University Athletic Association All-Academic team.

In his senior year in 2014 he batted .359 with a team-leading .468 on base percentage, and was the 6th-toughest batter to strike out in NCAA Division III. As team captain, he helped lead Rochester to its first Liberty League Championship Game in school history, while being named to the 2014 Liberty League Championship All-Tournament Team.

== College coaching career ==
Mulberg was Assistant Baseball Coach/Recruiting Coordinator at Franklin & Marshall College from 2014 to 2016. He was then Assistant Baseball Coach at Bucknell University for the Bison in 2016. He then spent nine seasons with University of Richmond as the Assistant Baseball Coach/Recruiting Coordinator and infield/catching instructor for the Spiders. On July 3, 2025, Mulberg was named the head baseball coach at Johns Hopkins University.

== Team Israel ==
Mulberg has been the baseball assistant coach of the Israel national baseball team since 2019.

The team played in the 2019 European Baseball Championship - B-Pool in early July 2019 in Blagoevgrad, Bulgaria, winning all five of its games and advancing to the playoffs against Team Lithuania in the 2019 Playoff Series at the end of July 2019 for the last qualifying spot for the 2019 European Baseball Championship.

In September 2019, Mulberg coached Team Israel to a fourth-place finish at the 2019 European Baseball Championship in Germany. Among the teams Team Israel defeated was Team Germany.

He also was on the coaching staff for Israel at the Africa/Europe 2020 Olympic Qualification tournament in Italy in September 2019, which Israel won to qualify to play baseball at the 2020 Summer Olympics in Tokyo.

Mulberg was the first base coach for Team Israel at the 2020 Tokyo Olympic Games. Israel won the country's first-ever Olympic baseball game after defeating Mexico, en route to finishing in fifth-place in Tokyo.

In October 2021, Mulberg was the recipient of the Outstanding Achievement Award at the 11th annual Katz JCC Sports Award Dinner for his work as a coach for Israel.
