= Mark Voger =

American author and journalist (born 1959 or 1960)

Mark Voger (born 1959 or 1960) is an American author and journalist based in New Jersey.

== Career ==
He started his career as an interviewer at the age of 11, when he interviewed Muhammad Ali for his school newspaper in 1971. Voger obtained the interview by knocking on the boxer's door at his house in Cherry Hill, New Jersey, where Voger grew up, and asking him directly. He later attended Cherry Hill High School East.

Voger spent 40 years in the news industry, later joining the Asbury Park Press and The Star-Ledger. He wrote the newspaper columns "PAGE X" and "Celebs" for the Press. In 2004, he received first-place awards in critical writing from New Jersey Press Association and the New Jersey chapter of the Society of Professional Journalists. In 2007, he interviewed singer Brian Wilson for the Press. That interview was later remembered for Wilson's answer that the critically panned Norbit was his favorite film. Voger is also active as an author, his first solo book Hero Gets Girl! The Life and Art of Kurt Schaffenberger being published in 2003. His second book, The Dark Age: Grim, Great & Gimmicky Post-modern Comics, was published in 2006 and reviewed favorably.

== Books ==
- Hamerlinck, P. C.; Voger, Mark (2003). Beck and Scaffenberger: Sons of Thunder. TwoMorrows Publishing. ISBN 978-1-893905-20-7.
- Voger, Mark (2004). Hero Gets Girl!: The Life and Art of Kurt Schaffenberger. TwoMorrows Publishing. ISBN 978-1-893905-29-0.
- ——————— (2006). The Dark Age: Grim, Great & Gimmicky Post-Modern Comics. Raleigh, North Carolina: TwoMorrows Publishing. ISBN 978-1-893905-53-5.
- ——————— (2015). Monster Mash: The Creepy, Kooky Monster Craze in America 1957-1972. TwoMorrows Publishing. ISBN 978-1-60549-064-9.
- ——————— (2017). Groovy: When Flower Power Bloomed in Pop Culture. TwoMorrows Publishing. ISBN 978-1-60549-080-9.
- ——————— (2020). Holly Jolly: Celebrating Christmas Past in Pop Culture. TwoMorrows Publishing. ISBN 978-1-60549-097-7.
- ——————— (2022). Britmania: The British Invasion of the Sixties in Pop Culture. TwoMorrows Publishing. ISBN 978-1-60549-115-8.
- ——————— (2024). Zowie!: The TV Superhero Craze in '60s Pop Culture. TwoMorrows Publishing. ISBN 978-1-60549-125-7.
- ——————— (2025). Futuristic: Rockets, Robots and Rayguns of Space Age Pop Culture. TwoMorrows Publishing. ISBN 978-1-60549-127-1.
- ——————— (2026). Son of Monster Mash: Return to a Time When Monsters Ruled Retro Culture. TwoMorrows Publishing. ISBN 978-1-60549-136-3.
