= Paul Briglia =

Australian rules footballer

Personal information
- Full name: Paul Briglia
- Born: 9 April 1940 (age 86)
- Original team: Xavier College
- Height: 188 cm (6 ft 2 in)
- Weight: 83 kg (183 lb)

Playing career^{1}
Years	Club	Games (Goals)
1959–61	South Melbourne	16 (14)
- ^{1} Playing statistics correct to the end of 1961.

Paul Briglia (born 9 April 1940) is a former Australian rules footballer who played with South Melbourne in the Victorian Football League (VFL). Grandfather of current Hawthorn player Jack Dalton who was taken at pick 35 in the 2025 National draft
