= Michael Lisicky =

American writer and oboist (born 1964)

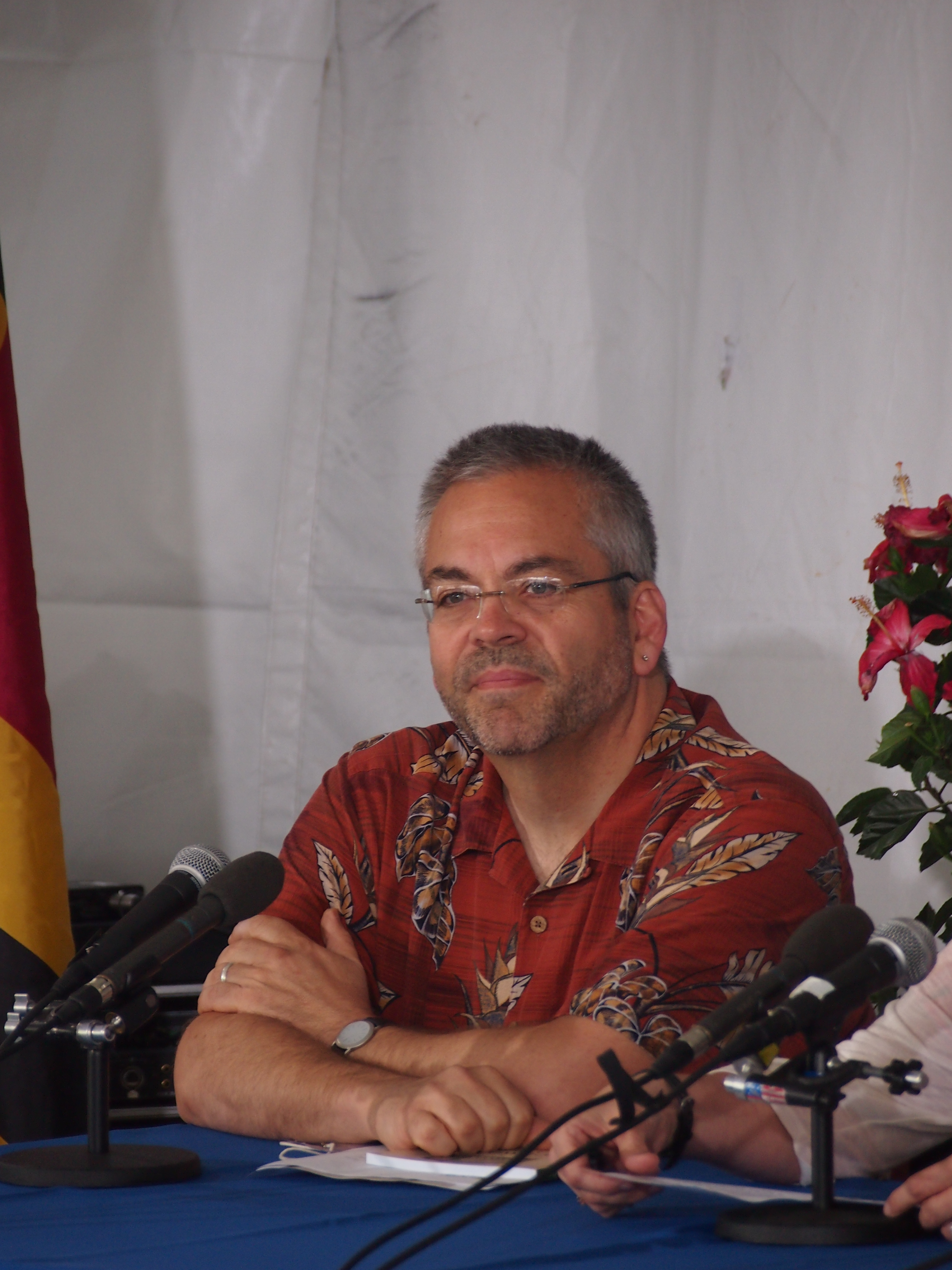
- reading at the 2014 Gaithersburg Book Festival
- Born: 1964 (age 61–62)

Michael Lisicky (born 1964) is an American non-fiction writer, retail historian, journalist, and oboist with the Baltimore Symphony Orchestra.

== Career ==
As a department store historian, Lisicky has given lectures at the New York Public Library, Boston Public Library, Free Library of Philadelphia, Enoch Pratt Free Library, DC Public Library, the Historical Society of Pennsylvania and at New York Fashion Week. He has appeared on CBS Sunday Morning and BBC World News and his works have appeared in such publications as The Philadelphia Inquirer, The Boston Globe, The Baltimore Sun, The Washington Post, and the Pittsburgh Post-Gazette. He has contributed to newspaper articles in The New York Times, The Wall Street Journal, Southern Living, and Fortune magazine and has worked on various projects for the History Channel.

From May 2020 through April 2021, Lisicky served as a contributing writer for Forbes.com. During the course of the year, he documented and reported on department store news and developments, from bankruptcies to perseverances. His columns focused on COVID's effects on the retail industry. Lisicky received a Forbes Favorites 2020 citation for his work on the demise of Lord & Taylor.

As an oboist, Lisicky has been a member of the Baltimore Symphony Orchestra since 2003. Prior to Baltimore, he was a member of the Richmond Symphony for fifteen seasons, and also was a musician with the former Savannah Symphony. His teachers include Alfred Genovese, John de Lancie, Peter Bowman, and Marion Norcross. He has appeared as a soloist with the Baltimore Symphony, in works by Haydn and J.C. Bach, and has performed with the Chicago Symphony, Cincinnati Symphony, and the Minnesota Orchestra.

On April 29, 2015, Lisicky organized an orchestral community concert outside the Joseph Meyerhoff Symphony Hall shortly after the murder of Freddie Gray. After several nights of demonstrations, hundreds attended the impromptu program which was reported on and broadcast locally and internationally. In July 2018, he was featured on the cover of the International Musician trade magazine and cited for his community outreach activities with his fellow BSO musicians. Lisicky served as a historian for the Baltimore Symphony Orchestra and is the author of the Baltimore Symphony's 100th anniversary book.

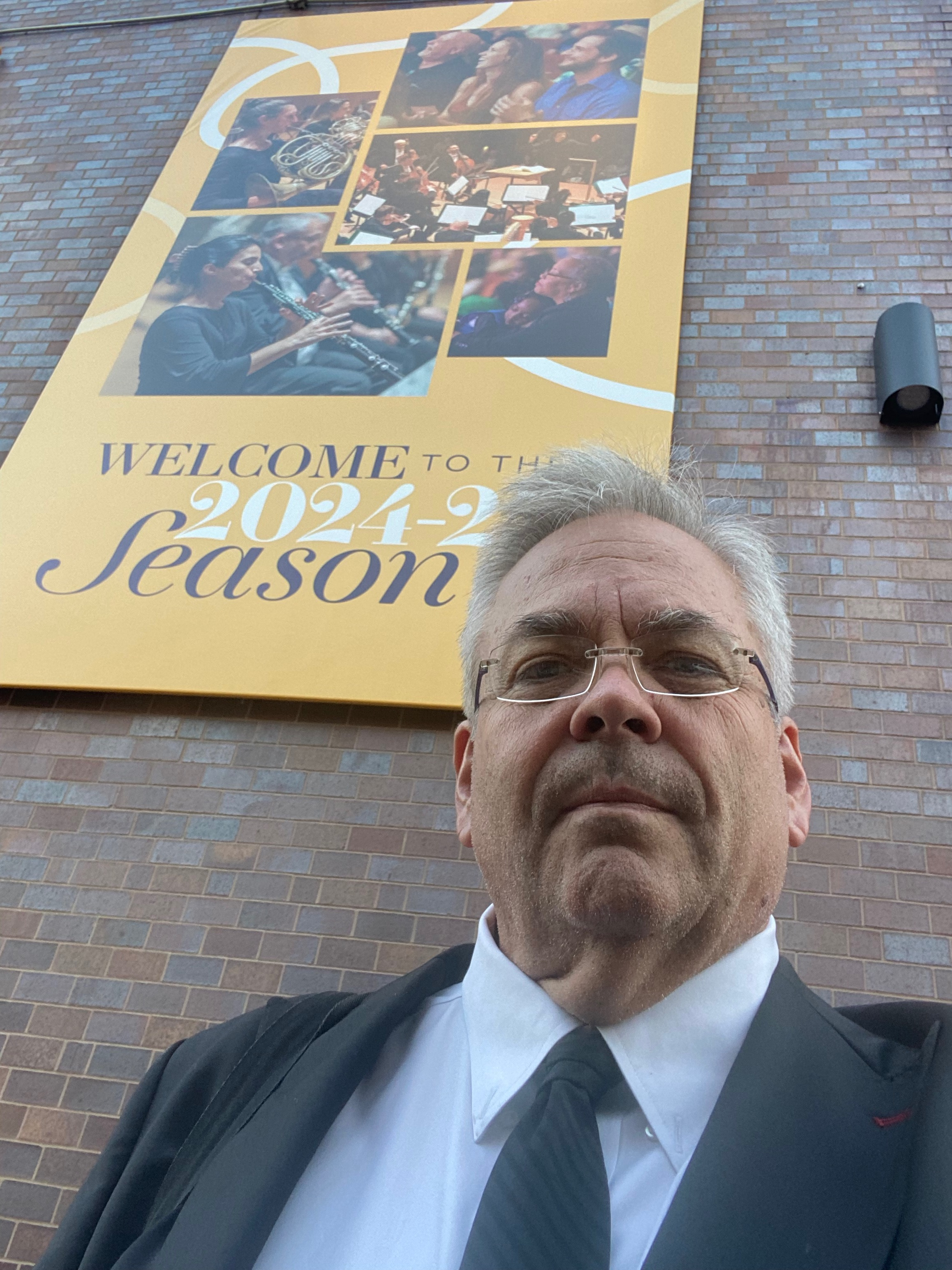

== Life ==
Lisicky was born in Camden, New Jersey and grew up in Cherry Hill, New Jersey. He is a 1982 graduate of Cherry Hill High School East and a graduate of the New England Conservatory. He currently resides in the Fell's Point section of Baltimore where, from 2007 to 2023, he served as the community's town crier. Lisicky is married to oboist Sandra Gerster and has one daughter, Jordan.

An avid runner, Lisicky received media attention in February 2024 for running all 1,794 miles (2,887 km) of public roadways in the city of Baltimore.

== Works ==
History

- Hutzler's: Where Baltimore Shops. The History Press. 2009. ISBN 978-1-59629-828-6.
- Gimbels Has It!. The History Press. 2011. ISBN 978-1-60949-307-3.
- Baltimore's Bygone Department Stores: Many Happy Returns. The History Press. 2012. ISBN 978-1-60949-667-8.
- Filene's: Boston's Great Specialty Store. Arcadia Publishing. 2012. ISBN 978-0-7385-9158-2.
- Wanamaker's: Meet Me at the Eagle. The History Press. 2010. ISBN 978-1-62619-068-9.
- Woodward & Lothrop: A Store Worthy of the Nation's Capital. The History Press. 2013. ISBN 978-1-62619-060-3.
- Shop Pomeroy's First. The History Press. 2014. ISBN 978-1-6261-9565-3.
- Baltimore Symphony Orchestra - A Century of Sound. Baltimore Symphony. 2015. ISBN 978-1-4951-7326-4.
- Remembering Maas Brothers. Arcadia Publishing. 2015. ISBN 978-1-4671-1473-8.
- Bamberger's: New Jersey's Greatest Store. The History Press. 2016. ISBN 978-1467136440.
- Abraham & Straus: It's Worth a Trip from Anywhere. The History Press. November 2017. ISBN 978-1625858870.
