= Larry Berg =

American business executive

- Larry Berg after being named MLS commissioner-elect, August 2026
- Education: University of Pennsylvania (BS); Harvard Business School (MBA)
- Occupation: Business executive
- Known for: Co-founder of Los Angeles FC; Commissioner-elect of Major League Soccer

Larry Berg is an American private equity executive and sports owner. He is the co-founder of Los Angeles FC and is the commissioner-elect of Major League Soccer. Berg is scheduled to succeed Don Garber on January 1, 2027.

== Early life and education ==
Berg was raised in Cherry Hill, New Jersey. He played youth soccer there and later played at Cherry Hill High School East, graduating in 1984. He spent one year at the University of North Carolina before transferring to the University of Pennsylvania, where he earned a bachelor's degree in economics from the Wharton School. He later received an MBA from Harvard Business School.

== Career ==
Berg was a senior partner at Apollo Global Management, a private equity firm, from 1992 to 2022. He served as a director of McGraw-Hill Education beginning in 2013 and as chairman from 2014. In September 2023, Berg joined 26North Partners, an alternatives platform founded by Josh Harris, as a partner in its private equity group. He later moved to an advisory role and said he would leave 26North as he prepared to become MLS commissioner.

Berg joined the Los Angeles FC ownership group as a limited partner in 2014, when Major League Soccer awarded the expansion franchise. In 2016 he became a co-managing owner with Bennett Rosenthal and Brandon Beck, and served a four-year term as lead managing owner. The club entered MLS in 2018. During his tenure it won the Supporters' Shield in 2019 and 2022 and the MLS Cup in 2022. He was named to Major League Soccer's sporting and competition committee and later became co-chair. The league also said the club opened BMO Stadium during his tenure and that he served on the board of the LAFC Foundation.

Berg has also held ownership interests in Serie A club AS Roma and Swansea City.

=== Major League Soccer ===
On August 3, 2026, the Major League Soccer Board of Governors selected Berg to succeed Don Garber as league commissioner in January 2027. He was chosen over former Fox Sports executive David Nathanson following a succession process begun in late 2025. Berg is expected to divest his stake in LAFC before taking office. Garber is to remain commissioner through 2026 and become chairman in 2027.
