= Pete Kugler =

American football player (born 1959)

No. 77, 67
- Position: Defensive end

Personal information
- Born: August 9, 1959 (age 67); Philadelphia, Pennsylvania, U.S.
- Listed height: 6 ft 4 in (1.93 m)
- Listed weight: 255 lb (116 kg)

Career information
- High school: Cherry Hill High School East, NJ
- College: Penn State
- NFL draft: 1981: 6th round, 147th overall pick

Career history
- San Francisco 49ers (1981–1983, 1986–1990); Philadelphia/Baltimore Stars (1984–1985)

Awards and highlights
- 3× Super Bowl champion (XVI, XXIII, XXIV); 2× USFL champion (1984, 1985); All-USFL (1984)

Career NFL statistics
- Games played: 81
- Sacks: 12.5
- Stats at Pro Football Reference

Peter David Kugler (born August 9, 1959) is an American former professional football player who was a defensive end for ten seasons, eight in the National Football League (NFL) for the San Francisco 49ers, and two seasons for the Philadelphia/Baltimore Stars of the United States Football League (USFL) in between his time with the 49ers.

Prior to his professional career, he played college football for the Penn State Nittany Lions.

== Biography ==
Although born in Philadelphia, Pennsylvania, Kugler was raised in Cherry Hill, New Jersey and was a football lineman at Cherry Hill High School East.

Kugler is the son of George F. Kugler Jr., who served as New Jersey Attorney General from 1970 to 1974. His brother Robert B. Kugler is a judge of the United States District Court for the District of New Jersey.
