= Cherry Hill High School East =

High school in Cherry Hill, New Jersey, US

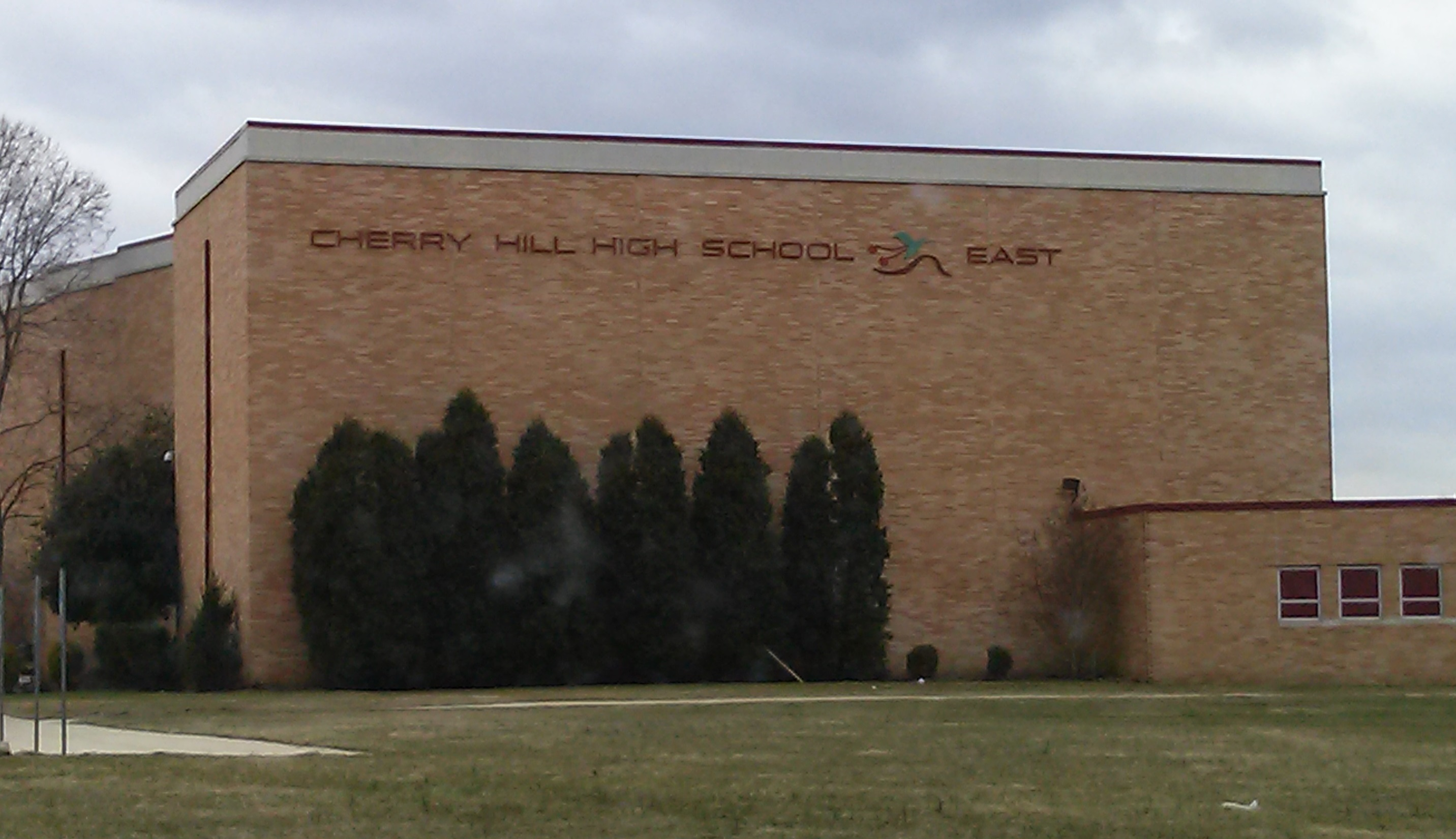
- Cherry Hill High School East in March 2014

Location
- 1750 Kresson Road; Cherry Hill, Camden County, New Jersey 08003; United States; 39.878173°N 74.963688°W

Information
- Type: Public high school
- Established: 1966
- School district: Cherry Hill Public Schools
- NCES School ID: 340300001418
- Principal: Leslie Walker (interim)
- Faculty: 143.0 FTEs
- Grades: 9–12
- Enrollment: 2,120 (as of 2024–25)
- Student to teacher ratio: 14.8:1
- Colors: Crimson; White
- Athletics conference: Olympic Conference (general); West Jersey Football League (football)
- Team name: Cougars
- Rival: Cherry Hill High School West
- Website: east.chclc.org

Cherry Hill High School East (also known as Cherry Hill East or CHE) is a four-year comprehensive public high school serving students in ninth through twelfth grades in Cherry Hill, in Camden County, in the U.S. state of New Jersey, operating as part of the Cherry Hill Public Schools. Cherry Hill East is one of three high schools in the district; the others are Cherry Hill High School West and the Coles High School Program.

As of the 2024–25 school year, the school had an enrollment of 2,120 students and 143.0 classroom teachers (on an FTE basis), for a student–teacher ratio of 14.8:1. There were 329 students (15.5% of enrollment) eligible for free lunch and 62 (2.9% of students) eligible for reduced-cost lunch.

== History ==
Due to delays in the construction of the new school building, the entering class of 450 students at Cherry Hill East began the 1966–67 school year attending split sessions at the original Cherry Hill High School building.

Constructed at a cost of $4 million (equivalent to $39.7 million in 2025), the school building opened in January 1967 as the township's second high school facility. What then became known as Cherry Hill High School West was the first public high school in Cherry Hill.

Starting in the 2024–25 school year, the Cherry Hill Alternative High School was moved from the Lewis Administration Building and renamed as Coles High School Program, operated as a school-within-a-school at Cherry Hill High School East.

== Social activism ==
=== Student demonstrations for school security ===
On February 26, 2018, in the wake of the Stoneman Douglas high school shooting and the March for Our Lives Movement, student leaders staged an auditorium protest against the suspension of a popular history teacher after the teacher claimed that a school shooting was imminent at Cherry Hill East, stating "I have the gun". The following day, hundreds of students staged a school walkout. They walked through the school's sidewalks and 17 laps around the track field in honor of the 17 victims of the Stoneman Douglas shooting. The walkout lasted around an hour before students returned to class. A petition urging the teacher's reinstatement was signed by 500 students. During a school board meeting with Cherry Hill Public Schools Superintendent Joseph Meloche that night, frustrated parents and students voiced their grievances about the school's security and the teacher's suspension.

=== Student advocacy for mandatory African-American history course ===
A group of East students from the Cherry Hill East African American Culture Club advocated for a mandatory African American history course in order to graduate. After impassioned speeches by student activists from a variety of backgrounds at a virtual board meeting for Cherry Hill Public Schools in February 2021, the board voted 8–0 to make the course a requirement for graduation. This mandate, the first of its kind in the state, has been in effect since the 2021–2022 school year course.

== Awards, recognition and rankings ==
For the 2001–02 school year, Cherry Hill High School East received the National Blue Ribbon Award of Excellence from the United States Department of Education, the highest honor that an American school can achieve.

In 2015, Newsweek ranked Cherry Hill High School East the 85th best high school in the nation out of 22,000 schools.

In its 2013 report on "America's Best High Schools", The Daily Beast ranked the school 354th in the nation among participating public high schools and 29th among schools in New Jersey.

In the 2011 "Ranking America's High Schools" issue by The Washington Post, the school was ranked 65th in New Jersey and 1,833rd nationwide. The school was ranked 1,664th nationwide, the 66th-highest in New Jersey, in Newsweek magazine's 2010 rankings of America's Best High Schools. In Newsweek's 2007 edition of "America's Top Public High Schools" ranked Cherry Hill High School East in 1,258th place, the 38th-highest ranked school in New Jersey.

The school was the 40th-ranked public high school in New Jersey out of 339 schools statewide in New Jersey Monthly magazine's September 2014 cover story on the state's "Top Public High Schools", using a new ranking methodology. The school had been ranked 98th in the state of 328 schools in 2012, after being ranked 57th in 2010 out of 322 schools listed. The magazine ranked the school 61st in 2008 out of 316 schools. The school was ranked 42nd in the magazine's September 2006 issue, which included 316 schools across the state. Schooldigger.com ranked the school tied for 36th out of 381 public high schools statewide in its 2011 rankings (an increase of 16 positions from the 2010 ranking) which were based on the combined percentage of students classified as proficient or above proficient on the mathematics (93.3%) and language arts literacy (98.3%) components of the High School Proficiency Assessment (HSPA).

Cherry Hill High School East won the 1998 National High School Mock Trial Championship, held in Albuquerque, New Mexico.

The American Scholastic Press Association named Cherry Hill High School East's newspaper Eastside number one in the country in 2005, 2017, and 2019, and number one in the state from 2007 to 2019. In 2023, the National Scholastic Press Association (NSPA), which honors top scholastic journalism, awarded the Eastside staff with various accolades: Second Place for Multimedia Feature Story, Fifth Place for Multimedia Sports Story, and Honorable mention for Multimedia News Story. Additionally, in 2022, NSPA awarded Eastside an Online Pacemaker, the preeminent recognition given by the association.

In 2009, the team representing Cherry Hill High School East produced a documentary that placed nationally in the Senior Group Documentary division of the National History Day competition in College Park, Maryland.

== 2007 grade-fixing scandal ==
In 2007, the school received coverage for a grade-fixing incident after two students were found to have used a teacher's password to hack into the board of education's database and change at least six other students' grades. In September 2006, during a routine check, the school became aware of the changes and began an investigation with the police. In January 2007, two students were arrested for the crime and charged with third degree computer theft. One was a freshman at Drexel University while the other was still a senior at East. The students received probation after pleading guilty. Four more students were disciplined by the school for paying the two hackers to change their grades.

== 2018 STOPit school shooting threats ==
In 2018, in the aftermath of the Parkland school shooting, the school district had adopted the STOPit app to enable students to report safety concerns to guidance counselors and school administrators. On September 7, 2018, an incident was reported on STOPit about a student who had made remarks about plotting a school shooting at Cherry Hill East. This report had included details about this particular student's remarks in person and on social media, discussing potential targets, and this person's alleged goals to kill as many students as possible and to make national headlines. A "shelter-in-place" was called because the student allegedly making these threats could not be located. The student was located and questioned by the police. This student convinced school officials and the police they never made threats against Cherry Hill East and identified a possible suspect. The suspect sparred evenly with questioning by school officials, but eventually confessed. Assistant Principal Louis C. Papa called this "a criminal act" and stated that appropriate actions were taken by the school district and the police against this student.

== Dismissal of David Francis-Maurer ==
In May 2025, Cherry Hill High School East assistant principal David Francis-Maurer had his contract non-renewed and was placed on administrative leave. Supporters allege his removal followed efforts to raise concerns about school policies, student safety, and alleged discriminatory conduct. Francis-Maurer filed a lawsuit alleging retaliation and discrimination based on sexual orientation and religion, claiming principal Daniel Finkle and other administrators had made derogatory remarks and failed to adhere to mandated reporting and safety protocols. A performance-improvement plan imposed during spring break and overlapping obligations was cited as evidence of pretext. A public Donaldson hearing in July 2025 allowed community testimony in his favor, but the Board of Education did not vote to reinstate him, making the non-renewal final. The process drew criticism for lack of transparency and miscommunication, including about reasons for the non-renewal, the timing of meetings, and limited public commenting periods. Petitions and student walkouts followed in protest of his dismissal.

== Robotics ==
The Cherry Hill High School East Robotics club has sent at least one team to the Vex Robotics World Championship from 2009 to 2013, earning awards and acknowledgements both within the state and the world. The school has hosted the New Jersey state championship, at which the 2616B team has won the New Jersey state championship from 2012 to 2014. The 2616F team (Frightening Lightning) qualified for the World Championship in their rookie year (2013) and won the Teamwork award there. In the 2014 season they won multiple awards and competed at the World Championship again, along with 2616B and 2616D. In the virtual 2020 VEX Robotics World Championship, one of the Robotics Club's teams, dubbed the "Jersey Devils", proved victorious in the playoffs with their robot 2616J. Some media sources classify the Robotics Club as the best Robotics Club in the state of New Jersey.

== Athletics ==
The Cherry Hill High School East Cougars compete in the Olympic Conference, which is comprised of public and private high schools located in Burlington, Camden and Gloucester counties, and is overseen by the New Jersey State Interscholastic Athletic Association (NJSIAA). With 1,649 students in grades 10–12, the school was classified by the NJSIAA for the 2019–20 school year as Group IV for most athletic competition purposes, which included schools with an enrollment of 1,060 to 5,049 students in that grade range. The football team competes in the Classic Division of the 94-team West Jersey Football League superconference and was classified by the NJSIAA as Group V South for football for 2024–2026, which included schools with 1,333 to 2,324 students.

=== Baseball ===
The varsity boys' baseball team won the 2014 Mingo Bay Classic in Myrtle Beach, South Carolina. They also won the 1986 and 1998 Olympic Conference Championship. In 2019, the team won the Olympic Conference American Division title.

=== Cross country ===
The varsity boys' cross country team won the South Jersey Group IV boys' NJSIAA sectional championships in 2013 and 2014. They won their first ever state Group IV boys' NJSIAA championship in 2014.

=== Basketball ===
East basketball teams are consistently ranked in the Top Ten in South Jersey. The team won its first ever South Jersey Group IV boys' NJSIAA championship in 2014, defeating Cherokee High School by a score of 54–41. They retained their South Jersey Group IV title in 2015 with a 48–39 win against Cherokee High School in double overtime.

=== Field hockey ===
In 1971, the field hockey team won the initial South I sectional championship.

=== Football ===
The Cougars used to play their home games at the township stadium, Jonas C. Morris Stadium, which they shared with Cherry Hill High School West, however the team now plays its home games at Cherry Hill East. Annually, the Cougars face cross town rival Cherry Hill West on the night before Thanksgiving, a rivalry described by The Philadelphia Inquirer as "one of the best in South Jersey", in which the winner of the contest receives the Al DiBart Memorial Trophy, also known as "The Boot." In 2024, the Cougars won "The Boot" for the first time after 12 consecutive losses with a 28–7 win over Cherry Hill West.

The 1988 football team finished the season with a record of 11-0 after winning the South Jersey Group IV state sectional title by defeating Brick Township High School by a score of 36–14 in the championship game.

=== Volleyball ===
The girls' volleyball team won its first New Jersey Group IV state championship in 2005, defeating Hunterdon Central Regional High School in the final game of the playoff tournament.

The boys' volleyball team won New Jersey Group IV state championships in 1996 (vs. Fair Lawn High School), 1997 (vs. West New York Memorial High School) and 1998 (vs. East Brunswick High School). The 1996 team ran their record to 22-0 after defeating defending-champion Fair Lawn in three games (16-14, 11-15 and 15–10) in the finals to win the Group III tournament. The 1998 team finished the season at 21-2 after defeating East Brunswick in two games (15–5 and 15–9) in the finals.

=== Tennis ===
The girls tennis team won the South state championship in 1973 and 1975. The team won the Group IV state championship in 1982 (vs. Ridgewood High School in the final match of the tournament), 1983, 1989 (vs. Marlboro High School), 1995 (vs. Middletown High School South), 1997 (vs. Hillsborough High School), 2001 (vs. Livingston High School), 2002 (vs. Watchung Hills Regional High School), 2003 (vs. Bridgewater-Raritan High School) and 2004 (vs. Marlboro HS). The team won the 2003 Tournament of Champions, defeating runner-up Montclair Kimberley Academy. The team's 9 group titles are the sixth-most of any school in the state In 2007, the girls' tennis team won the South Jersey, Group IV state sectional championship with a 4–1 win over Washington Township High School in the tournament final. In 2016, the girls' team repeated as South Jersey, Group IV state sectional champion with a 5–0 win over Egg Harbor Township High School.

The boys tennis team won the Group IV state championship in 1979 (defeating Ridgewood High School in the finals), 1980 (vs. Ridgewood), 1983 (vs. Ridgewood), 1990 (vs. East Brunswick High School), 1991 (vs. East Brunswick), 1993 (vs. Livingston High School), 1994 (vs. Bridgewater-Raritan High School) and 1995 (vs. Westfield High School). The team won the 1991 public school state championship against Haddonfield Memorial High School and then the overall state title, defeating Christian Brothers Academy in the public vs. non-public finals. The program's nine state titles are tied for tenth-most in the state. The team won the public school title in 1979 and ran their season record to 22–0 with a 3–2 win against Glen Ridge High School in the finals played at Princeton University's Jadwin Gymnasium. The 1980 team won the Group IV title with a 5–0 win against a Ridgewood squad that came into the finals with a 23-match winning streak.

=== Bowling ===
The boys' bowling team won the overall state championship in 1979. The team won the Group III title in 2007 and went on to win the sport's first Tournament of Champions.

=== Ice hockey ===
Cherry Hill High School East has a separate club ice hockey team as a member of the South Jersey High School Ice Hockey League. The team won four consecutive Varsity-Tier II championships in 2017, 2018, 2019 and 2020.

=== Swimming ===
The boys swim team won the public school state championship in Division A from 1971–1974 and 1976–1979, won the Public A title in 2002, 2015, 2017, 2019, and 2022; the 14 state titles are tied for sixth most in the state. The girls team won the Division A title in 1975–1977, 1979, 1983, 1984, 1986, 1997–1999 and 2025; the 13 state titles are the third-most in the state.

Through 2019, the boys' team has had 11 consecutive Central and South Jersey Group A sectional title wins, eight state Group A championship appearances and three state championship wins.

In 2015, the Cougars won their first state title in 13 years. In 2016, East would again lose to Westfield. In the 2017 championship, a rivalry was reborn between East and Bridgewater-Raritan High School. Their first bout led to East winning its second state title in three years. In the 2018 championship, the Cougars were bested by a strong Bridgewater-Raritan team. The two teams faced off again in the 2019 state championship, where East won the match-up. This was the team's third state title in five years.

== Clubs ==
As of the 2022–23 school year, Cherry Hill High School East has more than 100 student led clubs, intramural sports, and other extracurriculars.

Additionally, the school has a number of team-competition based clubs, such as its Robotics Club, World Affairs Council (which includes Model United Nations), Science Olympiad Team, Debate Team, DECA Club, Cheerleading Team, Badminton Team, and Science Olympiad Team.

Cherry Hill High School East's newspaper, Eastside, produces a 24 page monthly publication and has won the New Jersey Distinguished Journalism Award for the past ten years. Eastside's digital counterpart, Eastside Online, was a 2016 National Online Pacemaker Award winner and has won dozens of Best of SNO awards.

== Arts ==
Stay Tuned is a performing group of young men and women (usually including members of The Key of She and Casual Harmony) who compete in a cappella competitions around the state and the country with current hits. In 2016, Stay Tuned starred on a Lifetime docuseries, called Pitch Slapped, following their work with Deke Sharon.

== Administrators ==
The school's interim principal is Leslie Walker. The core administration team includes four assistant principals.

== Notable alumni ==
- Andrew Barroway, hedge fund manager, who has been the minority owner of the Arizona Coyotes of the National Hockey League
- Lawrence Bender (born 1957), Academy Award-winning producer for film and television whose credits include Reservoir Dogs, Pulp Fiction, Good Will Hunting and An Inconvenient Truth
- James Berardinelli (born 1967), film critic
- Larry Berg (class of 1984), co-founder of Los Angeles FC and commissioner-elect of Major League Soccer
- Matt Bush (born 1986), actor mostly known for his role as the teenager who throws away his minutes in the AT&T commercials
- Stan Clayton (born 1965), former American football guard and tackle who played in the NFL for the Atlanta Falcons and New England Patriots in 1990 and 1991
- Andy Coen (born 1964), head football coach of the Lehigh Mountain Hawks football team
- Angela Duckworth (born 1970), 2013 MacArthur Grant Recipient and professor of psychology at the University of Pennsylvania
- Bill "Stink" Fisher (born 1970), former National Football League player and actor
- Ed Foley (born 1967), Temple Owls football tight ends coach, assistant offensive line coach and recruiting coordinator
- Glenn Foley (born 1970), former NFL quarterback who played for the New York Jets from 1994 to 1998
- Eric Goldberg (born 1955), animator and film director best known for his work at Walt Disney Animation Studios
- Adam Goldworm (born 1978, class of 1994), producer of several films and television anthologies including Showtime's Masters of Horror and NBC's Fear Itself
- Bob Greene (born 1958), personal trainer, frequent guest on The Oprah Winfrey Show
- Louis Greenwald (born 1967), politician who represents the 6th Legislative District in the New Jersey General Assembly
- Jeff Hamburg (born 1956), composer
- Orel Hershiser (born 1958), former professional baseball pitcher who played most of his career with the Los Angeles Dodgers
- Tom Hessert III (born 1986), stock car racing driver who competes in the ARCA Menards Series
- Elie Honig (class of 1993), attorney and CNN senior legal analyst
- Nick Katsikis (born 1967), former professional basketball player
- Tom Katsikis (born 1967), former professional basketball player
- Sean Killion (born 1967, class of 1986), former competition swimmer and Pan American Games gold medalist, who represented the United States at the 1992 Summer Olympics
- Andy Kim (born 1982), Democratic politician who is the first Korean American to serve in the United States Senate and formerly served as an adviser to President Obama on national security
- Pete Kugler (born 1959), defensive lineman who played 10 seasons in the National Football League for the San Francisco 49ers
- Rick Lancellotti (born 1956), former Major league Baseball player
- Jamie Leach (born 1969), former professional right wing who played in the NHL for the Pittsburgh Penguins, Hartford Whalers and Florida Panthers
- Amos Lee (born 1978), singer/songwriter
- Toby Lightman (born 1978, class of 1996), singer/songwriter
- Michael Lisicky (born 1964, class of 1982), non-fiction writer and oboist with the Baltimore Symphony Orchestra
- Paul Lisicky (born 1959), novelist and memoirist
- Jim McGorman (born c. 1974, class of 1992), musician, songwriter/producer and multi-instrumentalist
- Cristin Milioti (born 1985, class of 2003), Emmy Award winning Broadway, TV and film actress, who received a 2012 Tony Award nomination for Best Actress in a Musical for her work in Once
- Nate Mulberg, head baseball coach for the Johns Hopkins Blue Jays and assistant coach of the Israel national baseball team
- Ali Noorzad (born 1985), Afghan international basketball player
- Erik Peterson (born 1966), politician who serves in the New Jersey General Assembly representing the 23rd Legislative District
- Leon Rose (born 1961), lawyer and sports agent for NBA players, including Allen Iverson and LeBron James
- J. D. Roth (born 1968, class of 1986), host of Endurance
- Stable Ronaldo (online name of Rani Netz, born 2003, class of 2021), Twitch streamer and YouTuber
- Mark Voger (born 1959/60), author and journalist
- Gary Wang (born c. 1993, class of 2011), co-founder and former CTO of cryptocurrency exchange FTX, which he established in 2019 with Sam Bankman-Fried
- Evan Weiss, musician, of Into It. Over It., Their / They're / There and Pet Symmetry
- Yang Jin-mo (class of 1995), South Korean film editor, nominated for Academy Award for his work on Parasite
