= David Porcelijn =

Dutch composer and conductor (born 1947)

David Porcelijn (born 7 January 1947 in Achtkarspelen) is a Dutch composer and conductor.

David Porcelijn studied flute, composition and conducting at the Royal Conservatoire of Music in The Hague. He also studied the baroque flute, specialising in authentic performance practice of the baroque and classical periods, which has informed his interpretations as a conductor in that repertoire ever since. He won a scholarship to study conducting and composition in Geneva. He has appeared with the London Philharmonic Orchestra, London Sinfonietta, the BBC Symphony Orchestra, the Bergen Philharmonic Orchestra, SWR Sinfonieorchester Baden Baden und Freiburg, Orquesta Filharmónica de Gran Canaria, NDR Radiophilharmonie Hannover and Polish National Radio Symphony Orchestra, amongst many others. In 2002 he conducted the Slovak Philharmonic Orchestra in an all-Stravinsky concert at the Prague Spring Festival. In 2004 he made his debut with the Philharmonia Orchestra in their series “Music of Today”, and also took the orchestra on tour.

As well as conducting the core repertoire, he also has an interest in new music. With musical director Ton Hartsuiker, he founded Ensemble M (1974–1978) for the performance of modern music. In 2003 he took the Nieuw Ensemble of Amsterdam to the Edinburgh International Festival for three concerts.

Porcelijn currently splits his time between Australia, Czech Republic, and Mexico, conducting with major cultural organisations like Opera Australia, the Prague Spring Festival and the Orquesta Filharmónica de la Ciudad de México. He has held positions as chief conductor and artistic director of the Adelaide Symphony Orchestra (including a tour of China), chief conductor and artistic director of the Tasmanian Symphony Orchestra (including tours of North and South America), chief conductor and artistic director of the RTS Symphony Orchestra in Belgrade, music director and conductor of the Nederlands Dans Theater and he has also been a regular guest conductor of the Sydney Symphony Orchestra.

From 2010 he served as chief conductor of the South Jutland Symphony Orchestra (Sønderjyllands Symfoniorkester) in Denmark.

In 1992 he was awarded the prize as Best Opera Conductor at the Munich Biennial for a production with Netherlands Opera. In 1994 he made his British operatic debut conducting Verdi's Oberto at Opera North. He made his Australian opera debut in 1991 conducting Rigoletto for the State Opera of South Australia, where he has since conducted Macbeth, La traviata and John Adams' Nixon in China and, with Opera Queensland, Madama Butterfly. His work for Opera Australia at the Sydney Opera House has included Lucia di Lammermoor, Rigoletto, The Tales of Hoffmann and The Barber of Seville and, in co-operation with Opera Australia, he also conducted a semi-staged version of Rossini's La Cenerentola in Tasmania.

David Porcelijn's recordings include the symphonies of Christian Sinding with the Radio-Philharmonie Hannover des NDR. For ABC Classics in Australia is his complete cycle of Beethoven symphonies with the Tasmanian Symphony Orchestra, only the second such cycle using the Jonathan Del Mar edition, and the first Australian orchestra to record a Beethoven symphony cycle; Olivier Messiaen's Éclairs sur l'au-delà... with the Sydney Symphony (which won the 1994 Award for ABC Classic FM Australian Recording of the Year) and other records with the Adelaide and Tasmanian symphony orchestras that have included CDs of music by the Australian composers Richard Meale, Peter Sculthorpe (whose Sun Music I-IV won the 1997 ARIA award for Best Australian Classical Recording), Nigel Westlake and Matthew Hindson. Other CDs for ABC Classics include music by Kurt Schwertsik, Schubert lieder (orchestrated by Brahms, Reger, Offenbach and Liszt), overtures by Daniel Auber, the first in a series of showpieces for piano and orchestra with Ian Munro as soloist, and harp concertos played by Alice Giles. For EMERGO he has recorded music by the Dutch composers Tristan Keuris (with the Netherlands Radio Philharmonic Orchestra and Chorus) and Hans Kox. For CPO, he recorded symphonic works of the Dutch composers Julius Röntgen, Henk Badings and Jan van Gilse, as well as Slovak composer Ľudovít Rajter. This project will be in co-operation with various German, Swedish and Dutch orchestras. With the Janáček Philharmonic Orchestra in the Czech Republic, he recorded albums with music Jeff Hamburg, Isidora Žebeljan, Jacqueline Fontyn and Martin Smolka for Future Classics, CPO and Cybelle Records. For Phaedra he recorded sacred vocal works by Slovak romantic composer Ján Levoslav Bella with the Janáček Philhamornic Orchestra.

David Porcelijn has been professor in conducting at the Utrecht-Amsterdam and at the Sydney Conservatorium of Music.

Porcelijn's music is published by Donemus.

== Awards and nominations ==
=== ARIA Music Awards ===
The ARIA Music Awards is an annual awards ceremony that recognises excellence, innovation, and achievement across all genres of Australian music. They commenced in 1987.

Year	Nominee / work	Award	Result	Ref.
1994	Ross Edwards Orchestral Works (with Dene Olding, Sydney Symphony Orchestra & Stuart Challender)	Best Classical Album	Won	
1995	Powerhouse Three Poems of Byron – Capriccio Nocturnes Unchained Melody (with Adelaide Symphony Orchestra & János Fürst)	Best Classical Album	Nominated	
1997	Peter Sculthorpe: Sun Music (with Adelaide Symphony Orchestra)	Best Classical Album	Won	
1997	Peter Sculthorpe: The Fifth Continent (with Tasmanian Symphony Orchestra)	Best Classical Album	Nominated	

== Sources ==
- Patrick Garvey Management
