= Rick Lancellotti =

American baseball player (born 1956)

- First baseman
- Born: July 5, 1956 (age 69); Providence, Rhode Island, U.S.
- Batted: Left Threw: Left

Professional debut
- MLB: August 27, 1982, for the San Diego Padres
- NPB: April 10, 1987, for the Hiroshima Toyo Carp

Last appearance
- NPB: August 30, 1988, for the Hiroshima Toyo Carp
- MLB: August 18, 1990, for the Boston Red Sox

MLB statistics
- Batting average: .169
- Home runs: 2
- Runs batted in: 11

NPB statistics
- Batting average: .207
- Home runs: 58
- Runs batted in: 133
- Stats at Baseball Reference

Teams
- San Diego Padres (1982); San Francisco Giants (1986); Hiroshima Toyo Carp (1987–1988); Boston Red Sox (1990)

Richard Anthony Lancellotti (born July 5, 1956) is an American former first baseman-outfielder in Major League Baseball who played for the San Diego Padres (1982), San Francisco Giants (1986) and Boston Red Sox (1990). He batted and threw left-handed.

Lancellotti moved frequently in his youth, leaving Concord, New Hampshire, for Cherry Hill, New Jersey, as a teenager and transferred to Cherry Hill High School East in his junior year where he made the baseball team as a pitcher.

A capable slugger who led four different leagues in home runs, Lancellotti played in 15 different leagues and several countries, including stints in Canada, Colombia, Italy, Japan, Mexico and Venezuela.

In 1979, Lancellotti was named the Eastern League most valuable player after he led the league with 41 home runs and 107 runs batted in while playing for the Buffalo Bisons, the Double-A affiliate of the Pittsburgh Pirates. On August 5, 1980, Lancellotti, along with Luis Salazar, was traded to the San Diego Padres for a player to be named later and Kurt Bevacqua. The Padres later sent Mark Lee to Pittsburgh to complete the trade. He made his Major League debut with the San Diego Padres in 1982, appearing in 17 games. His career-highlight came in 1984, when he led all professional baseball with 131 RBI and hit 29 home runs while playing for the Triple-A Las Vegas Stars, a Padres affiliate.

In 1986, Lancellotti led the Pacific Coast League with 31 home runs while playing for the Phoenix Firebirds, the Giants' Triple-A affiliate. At 30, he was promoted to the majors and hit .222 with two home runs and six RBI in 18 at-bats. In 1987 and 1988 he played in Japan, hitting 58 home runs in 190 games for the Hiroshima Carp, including a league-leading 39 homers in 1987. Two years later, he played in the now defunct Senior Professional Baseball Association, though he lied about his age, claiming he was older than he actually was to qualify for the league.

Lancellotti did not get another chance in the majors until August 1990, when he played four games for the Boston Red Sox and went 0-for-8. Lancellotti was a major player in the Red Sox famous Rally Cap game where several teammates used cups on their ears, hats on catcher-style, and shave cream on their faces. Dwight Evans homered to turn the game around during this comedic mêlée. Before the promotion he had 10 home runs for Triple-A Pawtucket. He returned to finish the month with 11 home runs to win the International League title with 21. Lancellotti was named the best player in the Red Sox farm system by the Boston Sportswriters Association. At the same time, Boston released him. In 1992, he played for the Parma Angels of Italy, being named the Best Hitter during the European Cup, held in the Netherlands. He retired after the season and settled in Buffalo, New York, where he established a baseball school in 1993. In 1995, he was a replacement player in spring training for the Florida Marlins during the ongoing strike.

In a three-season major league career, Lancellotti was a .169 hitter with two home runs and 11 RBI in 36 games. He belted 276 home runs in his minor league career.

Lancellotti was inducted into the Buffalo Baseball Hall of Fame in August 1995 and the Greater Buffalo Sports Hall of Fame in 2024.

Lancellotti's daughter, Katie, played college softball at Canisius College from 2009 to 2012. He and his wife Debbie also have a son, Joe. His father-in-law Jimmy Ludtka played minor league baseball in the 1950s. Ludtka founded a sporting goods company that Debbie later took over before selling the company in 2021.
