= Abraham Browning =

American politician

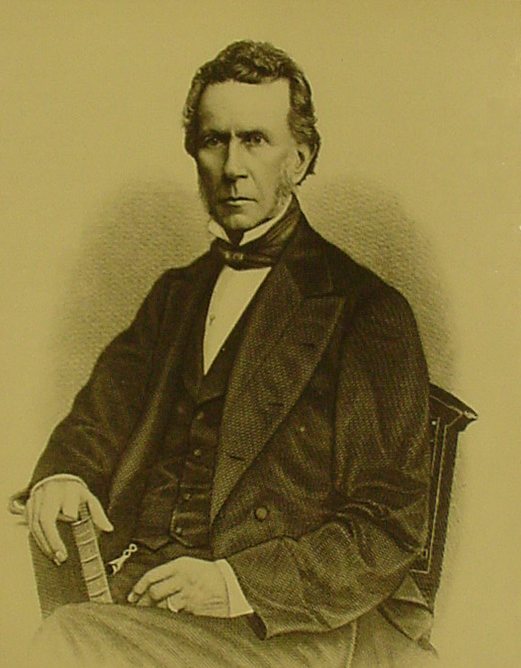

Abraham Browning (July 16, 1808 – August 22, 1889) was the Attorney General of New Jersey from 1845 to 1850 and a prominent citizen of Camden County, New Jersey.

== Biography ==
Browning was born near Camden in 1808 and entered the New Jersey bar in 1834. He was a delegate at the New Jersey Constitutional Convention in 1843, and later was appointed Attorney General under Governor Charles C. Stratton and stayed on during second tenure of Governor Daniel Haines. He would later serve as a delegate to the 1864 Democratic National Convention.

Abraham Browning should not be confused with Capt. Abraham M. Browning (1843-1880), who owned a farm called Cherry Hill Farm in what is now Cherry Hill NJ, on the site of the present-day Cherry Hill

Capt. A.M. Browning's Cherry Hill Farm helped give Cherry Hill, New Jersey its name, though there is evidence that the term goes back to the colonial period.

Legal offices
| Preceded by Richard P. Thompson | Attorney General of New Jersey; 1845– 1850 | Succeeded by Lucius Elmer |
