= Mickey Briglia =

Biographical details
- Born: September 6, 1929; Yorkville, Ohio, U.S.
- Died: January 3, 2006 (aged 76); Cherry Hill, New Jersey, U.S.
- Education: Ohio University; Temple University

Playing career
- c. 1946-1950: Ohio Bobcats
- Position: Co-captain

Coaching career (HC unless noted)
- 1964–1988: Rowan Profs

Head coaching record
- Overall: 502-258-9

D. Michael "Mickey" Briglia (September 6, 1929 – January 3, 2006) was a college baseball coach at Glassboro State College (now Rowan University). Briglia's teams won the NCAA Division III World Series in 1978 and again in 1979.

A native of Yorkville, Ohio, Briglia graduated from Ohio University in 1950, where he was a co-captain of the school's baseball team. He was awarded a doctorate at Temple University in 1968.

Briglia had an overall record of 502-258-9 in his 25 years coaching the Rowan Profs baseball team from 1964 to 1988. He was named NAIA coach of the year in 1968, and NCAA coach of the year for the 1978–79 season. Briglia was inducted into the American Baseball Coaches Association Hall of Fame in 1990.

Rowan University created a scholarship in his name, the Dr. Michael Briglia Scholar Award, awarded to students who excel at both academic studies as well as their non-academic aspects of college life.

A resident of Cherry Hill, New Jersey, Briglia died on January 3, 2006, at the age of 76 due to pulmonary fibrosis.
