= The Last Ship =

The Last Ship may refer to:

- The Last Ship (musical), 2014, developed by Sting
  - The Last Ship (album), 2013, featuring music connected to the musical
- The Last Ship (novel), 1988, by William Brinkley
  - The Last Ship (TV series), 2014–2018, loosely based on the novel
- "The Last Ship", a poem by J. R. R. Tolkien, appearing in The Adventures of Tom Bombadil
