= List of The Last Ship episodes =

The Last Ship is an American post-apocalyptic drama television series based on a novel of the same name by William Brinkley. In May 2013, cable network TNT placed a ten-episode order. It premiered on June 22, 2014, at 9:00 p.m. EDT and aired 56 episodes over 5 seasons, with the final episode on November 11, 2018.

== Series overview ==
Season	Episodes	Originally released	
Season	Episodes	First released	Last released
1	10	June 22, 2014	August 24, 2014
2	13	June 21, 2015	September 6, 2015
3	13	May 30, 2016	September 11, 2016
4	10	August 20, 2017	October 8, 2017
5	10	September 9, 2018	November 11, 2018

== Season 1 (2014) ==
No. overall	No. in season	Title	Directed by	Written by	Original release date	US viewers (millions)
1	1	"Phase Six"	Jonathan Mostow	Hank Steinberg and Steven Kane	June 22, 2014	5.33
Two civilian virologists, Drs. Rachel Scott and Quincy Tophet, claiming to be studying birds, join Captain Tom Chandler and crew aboard the USS Nathan James on their way to the Arctic. Renegade Russian forces attack them, and Chandler learns the virologists are actually collecting samples of a deadly virus that has infected 80 percent of the human population while they have been at sea. The remaining U.S. government orders the ship home, and those aboard try desperately – many in vain – to contact their families. After a nuclear detonation in France derails their plans for refueling, the crew boards a ship filled with dead, infected people. While originally setting sail for Naval Station Mayport, after losing contact with the government, Chandler decides that the best place to work on the vaccine is on the ship itself out in open sea. Dr. Tophet is revealed to be secretly communicating with the Russians.
2	2	"Welcome to Gitmo"	Jack Bender	Hank Steinberg and Josh Schaer	June 29, 2014	4.65
Captain Chandler orders the USS Nathan James to Guantanamo Bay Naval Base to restock the ship with fuel, food, medicine and other supplies. Three teams are dispatched to carry out these varied tasks. While there, they come under attack by escaped Al-Qaeda prisoners and enlist the help of Tex Nolan, a grizzled private contractor, who has been surviving for weeks. Meanwhile, back on board, Dr. Tophet is following orders from some unknown source and tries to sabotage proceedings, delaying departure long enough for a Russian battlecruiser to arrive on the scene.
3	3	"Dead Reckoning"	Jack Bender	Steven Kane	July 6, 2014	4.09
The USS Nathan James and its crew defends versus the Russian battle-cruiser, RFS Vyerni and its commander, Konstantin Ruskov, a legendary admiral studied by Chandler. Dr. Tophet attempts to kidnap Dr. Scott, and reveals that the Russians are holding his family hostage. The Nathan James attempts to escape by stealth, and Danny Green and Kara Foster go on a mission to disable the Russian ship. The ship is able to escape while Ruskov is revealed to have a Norwegian scientist named Niels Sorenson on board, whom Ruskov claims is vital to developing a cure for the virus.
4	4	"We'll Get There"	Jack Bender	Quinton Peeples	July 13, 2014	4.56
After leaving Gitmo, the ship and its crew are in danger when the propulsion system encounters serious mechanical problems. Dr. Scott's samples of the virus and all her research must be protected from overheating, while Captain Chandler comes up with ideas to face the ship's low water supplies and the lack of propulsion.
5	5	"El Toro"	Paul Holahan	Hank Steinberg and Cameron Welsh	July 20, 2014	4.06
Captain Chandler leads an expedition team in the jungle to find monkey test subjects for Dr. Scott's experiments, trying to complete her vaccine research. The crew are held in captivity by a former drug lord who is running the uninfected village near the river, and they soon find themselves in trouble trying to accomplish their mission and help the local people. After freeing themselves and getting the monkeys, the crew decides to help liberate the village from their oppressors.
6	6	"Lockdown"	Sergio Mimica-Gezzan	Hank Steinberg	July 27, 2014	4.36
While Scott is announced to be close to success with her vaccine trials, Danny Green contracts an illness that throws the ship into panic. Chandler has to deal with the crew's losing faith in both him and the vaccine research. Danny is proven to have contracted dengue fever, not the Red Flu, and Chandler decides to show the crew Scott's work so that they understand what she is up against and trying to do.
7	7	"SOS"	Michael Katleman	Jessica Butler and Jill Blankenship	August 3, 2014	4.15
Close to the cure, the doctor discovers that a human strand has been added to the virus, making it next to impossible to find the cure. In the communication room, a distress signal is picked up from the sole survivor of 50 people on a Jamaican fishing vessel. Scott realizes that the survivor is most likely naturally immune to the virus and may be the key to coming up with a cure. The crew is ambushed at the end of their mission to find the survivor and, in the ensuing gun battle, Tex and Captain Chandler are left stranded in open water. They are both captured by the Russians.
8	8	"Two Sailors Walk Into a Bar..."	Michael Katleman	Josh Schaer and Cameron Welsh	August 10, 2014	4.61
The Captain and Tex are transferred to the Russian ship. The Russians threaten to destroy the Nathan James if the crew does not turn over Dr. Scott, her research and the primordial strain of the virus. The crew agrees to the trade, but plants a locator beacon on Scott that enables them to locate the ship. On board, Scott helps Chandler and Tex escape and meets Niels Sorenson, Patient Zero of the Red Flu. Niels reveals that he had added the human gene to the virus in an attempt to combat it, but inadvertently made himself an asymptomatic carrier when he injected the virus back into himself, resulting in the rapid spread of the current strain. An attempt to test the vaccine on a Russian sailor apparently fails before the Nathan James forces assault the Russian ship and rescue Chandler, Tex, Scott and Tophet's family. The Russian ship is sunk by explosives planted by the boarding party, killing Admiral Ruskov, but one of the rescue team is hit by gunfire and dies. Unknown to the Nathan James crew, Niels is also able to escape disguised as a Russian sailor.
9	9	"Trials"	Jack Bender	Onalee Hunter Hughes	August 17, 2014	4.12
With Dr. Scott back on board, the crew begins prepping for human testing of the vaccine. Six volunteer crew members are selected as test subjects, based on their genetics. However, the testing does not go smoothly, as the sailors suffer symptoms and side effects that are unexpected and far worse than anticipated by Drs. Scott and Tophet, who disagree on the cause and go to extreme measures to counter which all seem to fail. In the process, however, Scott determines the virus causes a severe autoimmune response, turning the body into its own worst enemy. Scott is able to counter the effects and the trials are a success, though not without the loss of one of their own. Scott informs Chandler that they now have both a vaccine and a cure and can save those infected with the virus.
10	10	"No Place Like Home"	Brad Turner	Steven Kane	August 24, 2014	4.38
The Nathan James returns to the U.S. after making contact with a government facility in Baltimore under the direction of Amy Granderson (Alisha Granderson's mother), a surviving member of the Defense Policy board, and where Dr. Scott is hoping that mass production of the vaccine can be achieved, but not all is as it seems. Captain Chandler locates his family only to realize that a terrible secret is hiding behind what seems to be the new order. Meanwhile, state troopers allied with Granderson take over the ship, killing and injuring crew members, taking control of Nathan James, the lab, and the vaccine.

== Season 2 (2015) ==
No. overall	No. in season	Title	Directed by	Written by	Original release date	US viewers (millions)
11	1	"Unreal City"	Jack Bender	Hank Steinberg & Steven Kane	June 21, 2015	2.94
With Amy Granderson's men in possession of the Nathan James and Dr. Scott's samples of the cure, Tom Chandler attempts to rally the few men he has available to hit Granderson's power plant and comes across an unexpected ally in Thornwald.
12	2	"Fight the Ship"	Jack Bender	Hank Steinberg & Steven Kane	June 21, 2015	2.94
As Chandler and Thornwald raid Granderson's headquarters, the crew of the Nathan James fights to reclaim control of their ship. Slattery is able to escape captivity and guides teams around the ship in capturing and eliminating Granderson's forces. With the Nathan James back under their control, Slattery demands the surrender of Granderson, who kills Thorwald. After being confronted by Chandler, Granderson orders her forces to surrender before committing suicide rather than surrendering herself.
13	3	"It's Not a Rumor"	Tim Matheson	Hank Steinberg	June 28, 2015	3.28
The ship reaches Norfolk and makes contact with several teams of Navy pilots and SEALs and scattered remnants of other branches of the U.S. Armed Forces and civilian medical and scientific experts. It is found that several labs are up and running throughout the world, and several planes are sent to deliver and spread the cure. Several crew teams are dispatched to search for their families, with some success. Chandler manages both his family and his duty. In the end, the crew of the Nathan James, bolstered by reinforcements, decide to return to sea to continue their work on spreading the cure. Niels Sørensen, who, after his escape from Konstantin Ruskov, is now in Florida, infects and kills a small group of people. He ends up with a group of naturally immune survivors who see themselves as the true "inheritors of the Earth".
14	4	"Solace"	Sergio Mimica-Gezzan	Steven Kane	July 5, 2015	2.62
The discovery of a hospital ship in the ocean brings about the Nathan James as they investigate it for supplies to bolster Dr. Scott's lab for manufacturing the cure; however, the ship has been boarded by armed mercenaries searching for the cure.
15	5	"Achilles"	Jack Bender	Mark Malone	July 12, 2015	3.00
Following the fight on the hospital ship, the Nathan James plays cat and mouse with a British submarine commanded by Sean Ramsey. Meanwhile, a prisoner taken by the US ship reveals startling information about his comrades and their goals.
16	6	"Long Day's Journey"	Paul Holahan	Steven Kane	July 19, 2015	3.02
With the cure labs destroyed by the immune, Chandler goes in to hunt down the submarine and its crew while Dr. Scott attempts to complete her mentor's work in creating a powdered version of the cure.
17	7	"Alone and Unafraid"	Nelson McCormick	Jill Blankenship & Jessica Butler	July 26, 2015	2.96
Undercover inside of the Immune commune, Chandler works out a way to get President Jeffrey Michener away from the Immunes. The crew also discovers that Niels is with the Immunes, and trying to spread the virus to isolate the immune from the rest.
18	8	"Safe Zone"	Hank Steinberg	Hank Steinberg	August 2, 2015	2.86
Chandler tries to gain information and reverse the brainwashing suffered by President Michener. Rachel attempts to reconstruct Dr. Hunter's lost formula while wrestling with the knowledge that her bitter enemy is now on board the Nathan James once again.
19	9	"Uneasy Lies the Head"	Peter Weller	Nic Van Zeebroeck	August 9, 2015	2.98
Captain Chandler and his crew go ashore for components that Dr. Scott needs produce an aerosol-delivered cure, when they run into youths being enlisted by the Immunes to collect the bounty on Navy personnel. Rachel's tries to find a "contagious cure" that depends on Niels Sørenson, who was responsible for helping the spread of the contagion that took five billion lives.
20	10	"Friendly Fire"	Mario Van Peebles	Onalee Hunter Hughes	August 16, 2015	2.81
Alisha Granderson decodes a message found on a cell phone, that was recovered from the Immunes on land. Dr. Scott is hard at work, to find a more efficient version of the cure. Despite this, she is under investigation for her supposed murder of Niels Sørenson, and Chandler implies that she will be facing a civil trial once they return to shore.
21	11	"Valkyrie"	Olatunde Osunsanmi	Steven Kane	August 23, 2015	2.69
A message implicating the Navy in a devastating disaster is broadcast by Sean Ramsey, and causes problems aboard the ship. While one team is dispatched to shore to help civilians who fell victim to the New Orleans bombing, another team, led by Chandler himself, investigates an oil rig out at sea, which is later revealed to be the source of the Valkyrie Network. Later, they are attacked by a civilian vessel with a rocket launcher, and escape the rig with Valerie Raymond, the creator of the Valkyrie Network. On board the ship again, the crew pay tribute to their fallen.
22	12	"Cry Havoc"	Greg Beeman	Mark Malone & Nic Van Zeebroeck	August 30, 2015	2.96
The Nathan James is threatened in the Mississippi Delta, caught between a civilian blockade and the Immunes' submarine. Until the threat is eliminated, Capt. Chandler sends Dr. Scott ashore with the cure, along with the President and the children under Mike Slattery's protection. With the help of Valerie Raymond, the crew tricks the blockade and escapes before facing off with the Achilles which has secretly set up a shoreline missile battery. While spreading their new "contagious cure" to locals, Slattery's team learns of the battery and launches an attack to take control of it. The Nathan James is damaged, leaving only the ship's deck cannon operational with limited ammunition. After an exchange of torpedoes forces the Achilles to the surface, ground and sea forces combine fire to sink the submarine, along with the Ramsey brothers. The contagious cure is documented as successful.
23	13	"A More Perfect Union"	Jack Bender	Anne Cofell-Saunders	September 6, 2015	2.75
The Nathan James puts a call out to civilians to meet at ports along the Mississippi River, where they will receive the cure; small immune factions remain active in their quest to fight the cure. While the Immunes try to stop the distribution of the cure by pretending to be Navy personnel and exposing uninfected people to the virus, they are stopped and their leader is captured while the crew proves they're telling the truth by spreading the cure by aerosol. In St. Louis, Missouri, the ship is greeted by a massive crowd, including Russ Jeter's estranged in-laws who make up with him. The crew spreads the contagious cure as planned and Michener is sworn in as President. He also gets the Immune leader they captured to stop the efforts against them in exchange for a pardon. The Nathan James is put into dry dock for repairs from the damage it suffered fighting the Achilles and Chandler is promoted to Chief of Naval Operations. Dr. Scott is pardoned as well, but is shot dead in the hallway of a hotel.

== Season 3 (2016) ==
No. overall	No. in season	Title	Directed by	Written by	Original release date	US viewers (millions)
24	1	"The Scott Effect"	Michael Katleman	Steven Kane	May 30, 2016 (Note: The first episode of the third season, "The Scott Effect", was aired as a special premiere, three weeks before its formal premiere on June 19, 2016.)	1.86
It has been several months since the United States began rebuilding, with Chandler as the new Chief of Naval Operations and Slattery as the new captain of the Nathan James. While Chandler is in China trying to deal with the obstructive Peng to pass out the cure, Slattery and several other officers are ambushed at a Vietnamese nightclub.
25	2	"Rising Sun"	Michael Katleman	Hank Steinberg	June 19, 2016	1.78
As Lt. Danny Green and Burke evade the pirates who captured Slattery, Andrea Garnett and others, an attempt on his life leads Chandler off the grid as he, Wolf Taylor, and a local CIA agent try to make their way back to the Nathan James. In the end, they all make it back to the Nathan James, with the exception of Slattery and the remaining members of the crew, who are still captured aboard an unknown vessel, where the captors have decided to drain blood from Will Mason, with unknown intentions.
26	3	"Shanzhai"	Paul Holahan	Jorge Zamacona	June 26, 2016	2.42
Chandler travels to Shanzhai for information about the missing crew members, who try to get an idea of what they've been captured for. While in capture, Miller and Diaz manage to escape for a brief while in order to map out coordinates of the island. They are eventually recaptured, but Slattery and Jeter are able to hint the coordinates disguised as their serial numbers when a broadcast of the captives are aired.
27	4	"Devil May Care"	Paul Holahan	Nic Van Zeebroeck	July 3, 2016	1.97
With the public reveal of Slattery and company's abductions, Chandler and the Nathan James must infiltrate Peng's estate for a possible location on the captives. They discover that Peng is also looking for Takehaya, the pirate that kidnapped Slattery and company. With the help of a map from Peng’s estate, Chandler and the remaining crew are able to pinpoint five remaining islands where Slattery and the rest could be held captive. However, on the way to the first island, they encounter an underwater minefield.
28	5	"Minefield"	Peter Weller	Mark Malone	July 10, 2016	2.50
At sea, Chandler and the crew of the Nathan James encounter a minefield. They lose one diver after inspecting the mines, and later work out a strategy to get rid of the mines with “Nixies”. In addition, they face a torpedo stemming from an unknown origin. Though Taylor and Cruz go missing for a while, they are later found. In St. Louis, President Michener is meeting with the regional leaders and informs them of the current situation in Asia. Though conflicted, he orders them to maintain order with rioting going on in their respective areas. In captivity, Doc Rios helps tend to Takehaya’s wife, who’s both pregnant and suffering from malaria.
29	6	"Dog Day"	Michael Nankin	Jill Blankenship & Onalee Hunter Hughes	July 17, 2016	2.35
Andrea Garnett is able to escape for a short period of time in able to get a signal wave in the nearby communications tower. It is picked up by the Nathan James crew and they are eventually able to pinpoint the captives’ location. When Chandler and other members of the crew arrive on the island, Slattery and the rest are nowhere to be found. They are caught in the crossfire by Takehaya’s men, but manage to escape and find the rest of their crew. While escaping, Takehaya is shot by MSS members who have also emerged on the island and attack in overwhelming force. Guided by Jesse and Burk, the Nathan James takes out the Chinese forces with its 5in gun and Kyoko convinces her husband to surrender. The rescue is celebrated on board and back in St. Louis.
30	7	"In the Dark"	Steven Kane	Katie Swain	July 24, 2016	2.46
The crew of the Nathan James discovers that four Chinese vessels are pursuing them. They enlist help from Takehaya to escape them, which he does, by steering the ship through a minefield that he planted himself. The minefield takes out one of the Chinese destroyers. Rios is forced to perform an emergency C-section on Takehaya's wife with Green's help to successfully deliver her baby agree to give him the cure. Trying to work out how the cure that Japan received killed people instead of healing them, Takehaya reveals that he was given the team's location by Wu Ming in exchange for not pirating ships marked with a black circle. In addition, a delirious Kyoko mentions a strange green mist that she saw at night. Back in the U.S., President Michener deals with the fallout of a story published by reporter Jacob Barnes, which reveals that the president had his son flown down to Florida despite the fact that it was a possible red zone at the time. It is later believed that this stressed the president after he is found dead by Kara Green.
31	8	"Sea Change"	Jennifer Lynch	Sarah H. Haught	July 31, 2016	2.40
Chandler, his crew and Takehaya try to narrow down how the cure didn't work in Japan, but they find Shanzhai destroyed. However, they are later able to track down Wu Ming, rescuing him from Lau. Although Wu refuses to talk, he is revealed have lottery cards with numbers from ships on them, in addition to black markers that Takehaya mentioned that he shouldn't approach. Nathan James raids a yacht with the marker on it and recovers a missile that Jesse identifies as being identical to the ones that Peng was moving the night her brother died; the payload releases a green mist like the one Kyoko had described. Doc Rios determines that the mist is an anti-cure: it shields the virus from the cure, rendering it ineffective. Peng has been spreading the anti-cure before the cure arrives, committing genocide against the rest of Asia. In the U.S., Vice President Howard Oliver returns from his diplomatic mission in South America, and starts his duties as president following Jeffrey Michener's alleged suicide. He also approves Chandler to continue his mission in Asia, while also talking to the regional leaders. After an outburst from Kara, she is held outside of the next meeting between the president and his top advisors. After learning of the failure to kill Wu Ming, Peng orders the operation against Korea to be executed immediately.
32	9	"Paradise"	Paul Holahan	Jorge Zamacona	August 14, 2016	2.00
Chandler and the crew of the Nathan James track down Peng's anti-cure to an island named Parasio (Paradise), where it's stored in an old World War II factory. Back at sea, they track down a Chinese destroyer, which the two other American destroyers dub the Sea Dragon. While they are preparing to attack it, missiles from mainland China are fired out to sea and destroys the USS Shackleton while damaging the Hayward beyond repair. However, the Nathan James survives and destroys both the battery and the Sea Dragon before it can attack Korea. Back in the U.S., Kara deciphers strange transmissions that contains coordinates to the same locations that the crew had been on previously, which includes the night club in Vietnam, Shanzhai and the island where Takehaya kept Slattery and company captured. She was, however, too late to order the ships to stop. Allison Shaw later reveals to President Oliver that she, along with all the regional leaders, are staging a coup to decentralize the American government and hand respective powers to the regions. She leaves him no choice but to comply or his allies or family will be killed, effectively making him a puppet leader. She also has Secret Service agents kill regional leader William Beatty and the Secretary of Foreign Affairs Alex Rivera in the capitol parking lot, which Kara also witnessed.
33	10	"Scuttle"	Mairzee Almas	Ira Parker	August 21, 2016	2.32
Due to the damage that it sustained, the USS Hayward has to be scuttled. Against his will, President Oliver is forced to sign a warrant for captain Chandler's arrest on Allison Shaw's orders. Captain Joseph Meylan, the surviving captain of the Hayward complies with the order and has Chandler arrested on board the Nathan James while also relieving Slattery and most of the crew from their duties and replacing them with his surviving crew. Though Slattery and Sasha Cooper realize that Chandler has no strong defense, Chandler admits that he might have to commit treason in able to regain control of the ship. While his court-martial is in session, Slattery and the Nathan James crew relieves the Hayward crew of their duties and storm the court-martial. Meylan realizes that the court-martial never was about justice, but to buy time. Chandler tells him that he will face the consequences of his actions, but from a higher power rather than Meylan himself. In the U.S., Kara works with reporter Jacob Barnes and colleague Dennis to work out what Shaw and the regional leader's motives are, and discover targeted prisons in all respective regions. An arrest warrant is later issued for both her and Barnes, framing them for the murder of regional leader Beatty and Secretary of Foreign Affairs Rivera. They later discover that the military is helping to set up border walls between the regions.
34	11	"Legacy"	Paul Holahan	Hiram Martinez	August 28, 2016	2.54
Through flashbacks, it is revealed that President Michener was killed by two Secret Service agents who made it look like a suicide. At sea, the Nathan James sets course for Japan after pinpointing that President Peng would be going to destroy the Japanese National Archives in person, as suggested by Takehaya. Slattery and his team sneak on board the CNS Henan and hold the crew captive until Chandler and his team have cleared the archives, leaving command of the Nathan James to Garnett and Meylan. They encounter trouble when the second Chinese destroyer threatens to shoot the Henan if it does not respond. A crew member manages to activate the missiles before being shot. The Nathan James shoots down its missiles, clearing Chandler's team while Slattery uses the Henan's missiles to destroy the second enemy ship. Takehaya and Peng end up face to face and end up wounding one another. Takehaya then impales Peng with a sword, who then tells Chandler that he can't trust anyone at home, before impaling himself fully, to death. Back in the U.S., Kara, Barnes and Tex make a plan to extract President Oliver from holding Shaw's decentralization speech, which proves successful, but not without commotion. Following their escape, Shaw makes a speech to the nation, where she frames the death of Michener on his successor, Chandler and the Nathan James.
35	12	"Resistance"	Anton Cropper	Mark Malone & Nic Van Zeebroeck	September 4, 2016	2.13
The Nathan James is supposedly sunk after a missile ordered by Shaw destroys it. However, the Nathan James crew have managed to reach San Diego where they meet up with President Howard Oliver, Kara, Tex and his daughter Kathleen. They infiltrate a compound that supposedly is transferring food from Pacific Southwest to the Deep South, Roberta Price's region. With the plan almost executed, Alisha Granderson realizes via the radio from the general at the compound, that the cargo is not food, as originally suspected, but people. Chandler and his team manage to stop the train in time and tries to free the people, but to no avail, given that they insist that should just go to their designated location. Chandler and his team bring the general back to the compound to meet Manuel Castillo, the regional leader of the Pacific Southwest. They have him arrested, and hands the military responsibility back to President Oliver. Shaw has divers check the wreckage of the ship they sunk, and is shown photos that reveals that the ship wasn't the Nathan James, but the CNS Henan which the crew had taken over in Asia and brought back to the U.S to masquerade as the Nathan James.
36	13	"Don't Look Back"	Peter Weller	Jill Blankenship & Onalee Hunter Hughes	September 11, 2016	2.27
The crew of the Nathan James arrest the regional leaders of the East Coast and Midwest, Randall Croft and Albert Wilson, but fail to arrest Roberta Price, the regional leader of the Deep South due to her being present at the White House in St. Louis with Shaw. Shaw makes one last attempt to sink the Nathan James with a drone, but almost all the missiles are shot down by the ship itself. Only one of the last missiles gets a direct hit and damages the upper part of the ship, disabling vital equipment. Two teams from the ship, infiltrate the White House to get Shaw and Price, but Price is shot by Shaw's guards and Shaw having escaped, taking Chandler's children hostage. The teams eventually chase her to an airport, where Shaw demands an exchange: Chandler for his children. Tex sneaks on board the plane via the cargo hatch and guns down Shaw's guards, but dies from injuries sustained from the shooting. Before dying, he tells Chandler that he is "a good man". Shaw taunts Chandler about that America no longer is the country he knew, before being shot by him. Back on the ship, he tells Slattery that Shaw was right about the country having lost its moral values, but that he will not be the person to lead it out of it.

== Season 4 (2017) ==
No. overall	No. in season	Title	Directed by	Written by	Original release date	US viewers (millions)
37	1	"In Medias Res"	Paul Holahan	Steven Kane	August 20, 2017	1.87
Sixteen months after stopping the coup, the Nathan James searches for seeds with immunity to the Red Rust, a mutated strain of the Red Flu affecting the world's plant life and threatening a global famine. In Morocco, a shootout occurs after Mahmoud Zeddam, a terrorist informant, is shot. They manage to escape, and get Zeddam to the hospital wing at U.S. Navy Base Rota, Spain. The base is attacked by a terrorist faction, led by Omar Bin Dalik, who seeks the same information about the seeds from Zeddam, but he refuses to give up any information and is killed. Chandler is living as a fisherman in Greece with his children, new girlfriend Cali, and Cali's family. The quiet coast is disrupted by Giorgio Vellek, who takes away food supplies from people and arranges fighting matches. Chandler and Alex, Cali's father, steal back his fishing boat, only for it to be set ablaze later that night, killing Alex in the process. The day after, Chandler partakes in a fighting match and manages to beat Vellek's enforcer, Moose.
38	2	"The Pillars of Hercules"	Reza Tabrizi	Onalee Hunter	August 20, 2017	1.65
The Nathan James heads to the suspected location of the seeds in Oran, only to hit an IED off Gibraltar, knocking out power, and the ship is targeted by a mobile missile battery on The Rock. While the crew tries to restore power, Vulture and Cobra teams engage in a firefight with Bin Dalik's men in the Rock, locating the battery but getting pinned down. The crew manages to jumpstart the Nathan James using the helicopter's engine and destroy the battery with the 5in. In Greece, Chandler is brought into a gang fight club that is headed by Giorgio Vellek and his sister Lucia. He is challenged to beat the Greek Navy's new enforcer, dubbed Ares, which he manages, although Chandler nearly beats Ares to death. That night, he is dubbed Hercules in preparation for future matches and witnesses Giorgio murder Moose for his loss.
39	3	"Bread and Circuses"	Bobby Roth	Ira Parker	August 27, 2017	1.65
The crew of the Nathan James arrives in Oran, Algeria, where they are searching for the seeds, which are revealed to be in Omar Bin Dalik's possession after he stole them from Mahmoud Zeddam's grandmother. The two teams dispatched do not get a clear shot on Bin Dalik, but Sasha Cooper manages to distract his guards before fitting a tracker to his helicopter. The crew then track the helicopter to the island of Sardinia, where Bin Dalik presents the seeds to Giorgio Vellek, but the deal goes sour after Bin Dalik mentions that the Americans and British are after him. Vellek calls it a bluff and invites him to watch a fighting match after a new deal is reached. At the same time, two teams from the ship, with Slattery included, arrive on the island looking for the seeds. They are surprised to see Chandler in the fighting ring, but he faces no real challengers. Slattery eventually takes the challenge, and while fighting, learns of the seeds' location in the basement from Chandler. The teams from the ship cause an ambush which results in a gunfight between them, Vellek and Bin Dalik's men. Though Slattery gets the seeds, he is stabbed by Lucia, who escapes, while also revealing that Chandler is from the U.S Navy to her brother. While Chandler and the two teams are secure, Slattery is left injured while still carrying the seeds.
40	4	"Nostos"	Kenneth Fink	Jill Blankenship	September 3, 2017	1.67
On Sardinia, the two teams from the Nathan James encounter resistance from Bin Dalik and Vellek's men as they are all looking for Mike Slattery and the seeds. Slattery manages to get into a house, where a local woman helps tend to his wounds, while also drugging him with Nostos. He is also faced with hallucinations from the past, of his wife and children, and Chandler. He manages to escape the house after Bin Dalik raids it personally. He subsequently reaches a cathedral tower, where he signals with a broken mirror, to the Nathan James. The two teams and the helicopter are sent to extract him from the tower, but they face the forces of a Greek navy destroyer led by Lucia Vellek and commander Stavros Diomedes. The Greek destroyer is unsuccessful in shooting down the helicopter, which is saved by a missile from the James itself. The ship uses a Nulka decoy in order to confuse the Greek destroyer, which misses with its second missile. Slattery is extracted safely from the cathedral on board the helicopter, bringing him back to the ship.
41	5	"Allegiance"	Steven Kane	Michael Sussman	September 10, 2017	1.46
The crew of the Nathan James divert from their mission by delivering the seeds to Naples when they receive a suspicious distress call from a fishing trawler. Though Meylan is sceptical to the idea, which is partly shared by Chandler, but insists that they should rescue the people on board the trawler. The helicopter and a boat is sent to secure the trawler and its inhabitants. During this time, Burk seems paranoid when helping, something Green confronts him about back on the James. Burk reveals that he finds it hard to trust anyone after everything they have experienced. It is also revealed that one of the immigrants on board the trawler, is a fellow British intelligence agent working with James Fletcher, named Harry Sinclair. He has a message to Fletcher from the Riverhouse, which states that ties to the United States has been cut, and that the government is willing to find a cure to the Red Rust on their own. Fletcher asks if the doctor Sinclair is referring to, is Paul Vellek, which he confirms. He also orders Fletcher to get the seeds and that they leave the Nathan James soon after. Near the coast of Italy, the James loses contact with the inbound C-130 that was meant to meet them there. Kara Green and the rest of the leading crew, suspects that it was shot down by Vellek. Despite mixed feelings from the crew about his return, Chandler is sworn in again as a navy captain.
42	6	"Tempest"	Peter Weller	Katie Swain	September 17, 2017	1.58
The Greek navy has managed to track down the Nathan James and is headed by Lucia Vellek, alongside two other vessels. The Nathan James tries to lose them in a storm, which partally proves successful. On board the Nathan James, Fletcher and Sinclair go ahead with their plan. Sinclair stages a panic attack and is brought to the medical bay, before he escapes with the seeds. Fletcher on the other hand, gets hold of their equipment, but later carries it himself after Sinclair is shot and badly injured. They reach the outside of the ship, where Sinclair hands over the seeds to Fletcher and says it is up to him now. Sasha Cooper reaches Fletcher before he jumps overboard and is later picked up by Giorgio Vellek and his yacht. The incident on board the James leaves five dead, including Dr. Heggen in the medical bay, a Master-at-arms and Michael O'Connor. Following the memorial, Carlton Burk tells Eric Miller, that incidents such as the one that happened, should not happen again.
43	7	"Feast"	Bill Roe	Hiram Martinez	September 24, 2017	1.54
Based on accounts from Chandler, the two teams from the Nathan James head to Atokos Island, where Giorgio Vellek's mansion is located, and also where he hosts his fighting club. When they arrive at the mansion, Vellek is throwing a party, which allows the teams to sneak in. Azima Kandie goes in undercover before handing Vellek over to Chandler's team, while Miller, Taylor and Burk act as snipers and look-out. Cooper and Kandie manage to find encrypted files on Vellek's computer which they send to the James for decryption. As they are interrogating Vellek, Omar Bin Dalik and his men arrive, demanding to talk to Vellek. He executes one hostage before the James teams fire back, and Chandler's team move Vellek out of the mansion. Burk detonates a bomb in Vellek's office as Bin Dalik and his men reach it, killing them. Amid the commotion, Vellek escapes from their custody, and is presumed dead. Back on the ship, they discover that the files from Giorgio's computer contain videos and other files about the fighters in the so-called fighting club. They also discover that Dr. Paul Vellek used them as test subjects for an experiment to ease aggressive behaviour. They also discover the location of Vellek's lab, which is not permanently in place, but always on the move. Chandler concludes that it could only mean that Vellek's lab is on a ship.
44	8	"Lazaretto"	Paul Holahan	Story by : Sean Cook; Teleplay by : Jill Blankenship	October 1, 2017	1.34
The crew narrows down their search to Kleos Island, where they infiltrate the lazaretto, with Burk, Jeter, Green, Miller and Wolf going in undercover. Green, Wolf and Miller go in as prisoners, while Burk and Jeter get to the control room to extract information and send it to the Nathan James. Cooper and Kandie serve as snipers and look-out from the outside. Green, Miller and Wolf meet Ares, the man that Chandler fought in the footage they saw earlier. They learn from him that the mind-control drug is in the food, and that it serves as the main drug for everyone in the lazaretto. When Wolf refuses to eat, he fights back, but it leads to their cover to be blown and they flee the prison, but Ares is killed in the escape attempt. They are later extracted by the ship's helicopter. All of it does not go unnoticed by Vellek and his ships. James Fletcher tries to persuade Giorgio to work against his father, but fails after he is caught trying to transmit distress signal to the Nathan James explaining his actions. Unbeknown to the Velleks, the transmission reaches the James despite cutting off. Fletcher is killed by Giorgio and his body is thrown overboard.
45	9	"Detect, Deceive, Destroy"	Lukas Ettlin	Story by : Onalee Hunter Hughes & Jill Blankenship; Teleplay by : Onalee Hunter Hughes	October 8, 2017	1.34
As the Nathan James heads to Malta to stop the spread of Vellek's cure, the crew must confront the full force of his defenses. They work out a tactic to try and distract two of the three ships that are in formation, but Chandler suggests that the third one might not be the one with the seeds after all, and that there could be a fourth ship. This is later proven to be correct, as Lucia and Girogio are the only ones commanding the third Greek destroyer with its crew. Green, Kandie and Wolf head out in a speedboat and disguised as a fishing boat while towing a barrel of explosives for one of the other ships. Though the crew of said ship notices them, it's blown up and sinks. For the second last ship (out of the ones in formation), the Nathan James launches torpedoes into the water, if they pass without issues, they likely passed under fishing boats, but if they hit something, it would likely be said Greek destroyer. The strategy proves successful, as the second last destroyer is sunk. The third destroyer destroys a fishing boat, serving as a warning to Chandler and the James. Despite Lucia's warning, the James and the third ship ensue a battle with missiles and explosives at one another, though mostly failing in both directions. With their last bits of ammunition, the James eventually hits the third ship right in its bridge, also killing Giorgio in the process. The battle does not go without casualties, as their helicopter is shot down by the fourth Greek destroyer carrying Vellek. Despite this, Kathleen Nolan is the sole survivor from the helicopter and is rescued.
46	10	"Endgame"	Peter Weller	Hiram Martinez & Ira Parker	October 8, 2017	1.20
Danny Green, Kandie, Wolf, Miller and Burk are sent to the airfield in Valletta, Malta to stop Vellek's planes from taking off with the Nostos. They then destroy all the crates and planes after it's discovered that the plants in the crates contain bugs that are the carriers of the Nostos, though Green and Miller are injured during the mission. Back on the Nathan James, Chandler proposes that they should take out the last Greek destroyer from within and secure the seeds, something he volunteers to do because it is personal for him, but Cooper also volunteers to go with him. They sneak on board the Greek destroyer and disable its engines, causing power-outs on board, leaving it vulnerable to the James. Slattery plans a boarding team once Chandler's plan proves to have worked, and he also orders the James to be driven right towards the Greek destroyer, essentially sideswiping it. Once the James strikes the Greek destroyer, Slattery and his team go on board. Vellek sets his research and lab on fire to burn evidence and escapes to the ship's deck, where he is confronted by Chandler. Chandler tries to negotiate with him, but Vellek declines his offer before Chandler is pinned down by Lucia. Before she can do any more harm, she is shot by Cooper while Slattery and his team arrives. Vellek bids his farewell as he jumps from the ship, committing suicide. The seeds and Vellek's real cure are recovered, and it is predicted that the cure can be spread in half the time that it took the Red Rust to spread.

== Season 5 (2018) ==
No. overall	No. in season	Title	Directed by	Written by	Original release date	US viewers (millions)
47	1	"Casus Belli"	Paul Holahan	Steven Kane	September 9, 2018	1.26
Three years after the Red Rust epidemic, Chandler is working at the navy academy, Kara Green has become the new captain of the Nathan James with Carlton Burk as her XO, Granderson, Jeter and Meylan work at the United States Southern Command in Cape Canaveral, Florida. Danny Green, Wolf Taylor, Azima Kandie and Sasha Cooper are working in Panama, on a mission in an attempt to try to persuade the Panamanian president to accept aid from the United States, something he doesn't accept when they eventually meet him at his 50th birthday party. As they prepare to leave the country, news coverage reveals that the president has been assassinated and that they have been framed for his murder. At the same time, the Gran Colombian air force fire upon the American fleet during Fleetweek, leaving over a thousand dead, including Andrea Garnett and Dr. Rios. In addition, a cyberattack disables all electronic equipment around the country. In Panama, Green proposes that they head towards Gran Colombia and then wait for eventual back-up given that they know who the enemy is. Slattery and Burk join the speedboat from the Nathan James to head back to the ship and then head south.
48	2	"Fog of War"	Jann Turner	Jill Blankenship	September 16, 2018	1.31
Following the attack on the fleet by Tavo's air force, Chandler and command debate their next move, where Chandler suggests that the Nathan James could defend the canal in Mexico where the oil supply is located, but is downvoted by Lieutenant General Anita DuFine and General Don Kinkaid stating that they do not have the resources. At sea, the Nathan James battles a Colombian navy ship in blind, only using maps and minimal sonar navigation as assistance. The crew, led by Kara Green and Slattery, manage to duplicate their forces by sending a remote EMATT underwater to fool the enemy ship and lure in a full circle until it gets in firing range of the James. Though they miss a few times, they manage to disable the ship with, and an additional torpedo is also fired at the enemy ship before subsequently sinks. In South America, Green, Wolf, Kandie and Cooper meet up with a Panamanian resistance group and meets its leader, a DIA agent, Paul Shemanski, known as Pablo, who is a friend of Danny Green. During planning for an attack on a bridge, the group is attacked and held hostage by Colombian forces led by Colonel Perez. Perez executes some resistance members, including Pablo, after they refuse to give up information on Armando Maza, but the group manages to escape after Cooper and uncaptured resistance members fire back and drive the Colombian forces away.
49	3	"El Puente"	Bill Roe	Mark Malone	September 23, 2018	1.41
As enemy forces make their way north, Chandler decides to head back on board the Nathan James where representatives from Cuba and Mexico have met up with the crew to discuss an alliance to fight against Gran Colombia led by Gustavo Barros. The representatives are agitated at one another due to the tension and conflict between the two countries, which even leads to their own soldiers fighting in the cafeteria. Slattery brings the representatives back to the table afterward, and with Chandler, gives the chance to accept each other's differences and stand together against Gran Colombia. The James is later attacked by the Colombian air force, but fights back with the support from Cuban and Mexican soldiers on board and the ship's helicopter. At the U. S. Southern Command, President Joshua Reiss arrives, expressing frustration at the ones in charge of the command to not have informed him about the Nathan James participation and the coding that was sent between the ship and the command. He later expresses to Jeter, that the country would not be able to afford to lose Chandler. In South America, Green, Taylor, Cooper and Kandie, together with the Panamanian resistance group, plan an attack on a bridge that will prevent the Colombian forces from moving north. Armando Maza and resistance members hijack Colonel Perez's truck, but he escapes after alerting his troops of a trap. Taylor and Kandie set semtex explosives on a tanker and drive onto the bridge, jumping out before it detonates, causing the bridge to collapse, killing colonel Perez in the process.
50	4	"Tropic of Cancer"	Bud Kremp	Katie Swain	September 30, 2018	1.20
At sea, the Nathan James faces Colombian forces alongside Mexican and Cuban forces. The Mexicans manage to sink one ship that strikes their minefield, while another Colombian ship is headed towards the James before being scared away towards the Cuban forces. Though the Cubans respond by saying they will engage, they do not show any sign of responding later on. The James is then attacked repeatedly by an almost unseen Iowa-class battleship. Though Chandler insists they chase it, Commander Kara Green insists to the contrary due to the amount of damage the ship has sustained. The ship is later docked for repairs. In South America, Armando Maza sends resistance member Vasquez to escort Danny Green, Taylor, Kandie and Cooper to the airfield, though they are ambushed halfway their by Colombian forces and a minefield, which critically injures Taylor and kills Vasquez. The rest manage to get Taylor to a local medical clinic where Taylor is treated for his injuries to its best capabilities before Colombian forces raid the place, and the group departs. They subsequently reach the airfield and are flown back to the U.S. In the U.S., Clayton Swain and Alisha Granderson continue the investigation into the cyberattack, where digital footprints lead to a hack on key cards that was done at 14:16 on the day of the attack. Granderson suspects her fiancee after reflecting on memories from said day. She arrives home early to confront her fiancee, Kelsi Baker, who is revealed to be Tavo Bastarro's mole and a follower. Swain tries to call Granderson regarding further evidence, but she is caught in a brawl with Baker, before she is stabbed and killed before Baker escapes from their house.
51	5	"Warriors"	Peter Weller	Jill Blankenship & Onalee Hunter Hughes	October 7, 2018	1.05
Four months following the previous episode, the Nathan James is still undergoing repairs while its crew has drawn back to civilian life. Chandler, along with members of the U.S. Southern Command plan an extraction mission to get Barros' chief war strategist who is in Jamaica. Though president Reiss tells Chandler it is too dangerous for him to go, Chandler joins the mission regardless, alongside Eric Miller, Carlton Burk, Wolf Taylor and Danny Green. They capture the strategist, Manuel Montano, and hide in an underground bunker, waiting for extraction. During their time there, Montano reveals that he never supported Barros, but only did as he was told until he realized what a monster Barros was. During a discussion about war and peace with Montano, Chandler gets flashbacks to his life with his family, where he had a fallout with his daughter, who was furious over his lack of presence at home. Colombian forces descend on the bunker, and Chandler and his team shoot their way out, but Montano dies after being hit by enemy fire. Following the mission, Miller, the Burk brothers and Jeter, attend a family party in the Southern Parrish who has invited veterans and them, as members of the Nathan James crew. Chandler, having made amends with his daughter Ashley, following their fallout, bids her and his son, Sam, goodbye as they move to St. Louis. She wishes him well, and that he finds his peace.
52	6	"Air Drop"	Paul Holahan	Ira Parker	October 14, 2018	1.21
The U.S. launches a plan to provide weapons to Cuban resistance members, a plan which is considered highly risky, even by president Reiss. Despite this, navy and marine soldiers join forces and are deployed to Cuba, Chandler, Cooper, Taylor, Danny Green, Kandie and Miller being among them. While they and the marines leave the C-130 safely along with the package of weapons, Chandler remains on the plane until it is suddenly shot down by an unknown missile. The plane presumably crashes at sea. Chandler survives, but is injured. He manages to heal himself before making his way inland towards Havana where the others are. The package has landed at an apartment complex, where pro-Gran Colombia Cuban soldiers reside, which subsequently leads to a firefight between the marines, navy and the soldiers. Chandler and the Cuban resistance leader arrive and save them from incoming soldiers, and the resistance leader is revealed to be Cuban representative Eduardo Fuentes, who was sent to the Nathan James earlier. At sea, the crew of the Nathan James tracks the missile to have likely come from the same Iowa-class battleship they encountered in the Mexican bay earlier. Despite their efforts, they are unable to track it.
53	7	"Somos la Sangre"	Peter Weller	Hiram Martinez	October 21, 2018	1.30
American and Cuban resistance forces descend on a secret military base east outside of Havana, known as Camp X. It is unknown what the base hides, but the American and Cuban resistance forces face heavy backfire from the pro-Gran Colombian Cuban soldiers, going so far to use an M1 Abrams tank against them. American forces have also established a temporary base for their Cuban operations, which Chandler heads. He is advised by the son of local Cuban that there are tunnels that lead into the base, which marines and navy members utilize to get on the inside of the base. In the U.S., Kelsi Baker meets her Colombian lover, Octavio, who gives her a new mission from Barros. In Cuba, American and Cuban resistance forces find their way inside the base via the tunnels, and manage to take control of the base turret as an advantage. In the process, the unknown Iowa-class battleship fires and destroys the temporary base. The tank shoots at Miller, who attempts to save Marine Captain Utt from being hit, which he manages, but he is hit by the shot from the tank instead, losing his legs. After liberating the base and capturing surviving soldiers, including its leader Salazar, the forces search it, though to start off, don't find any useful info. Cooper later discover a large room, which she calls for Chandler to have a look at. When he enters, he discovers that the entire room, is the main room of the U.S. Southern Command, and realizes that the base was made for training for special operations. As he takes this in, Kelsi Baker fakes a seizure, giving Gran Colombian assassins enough time to enter the Command, disguised as paramedics. They kill several security guards and General Don Kinkaid in the process on their way in.
54	8	"Honor"	Paul Holahan	Onalee Hunter Hughes	October 28, 2018	1.12
Octavio de la Paz and his troops raid the U.S. Southern Command, looking for both the president and Chandler. He discovers the presidential bunker and orders the president to step out, something he refuses to do, but eventually complies with. President Reiss is brought in front of a camera and ordered to confess to his alleged actions that caused the Red Flu, Red Rust and the war with Gran Colombia. Initially, he refuses to, but after being slowly hanged by a rope, he subsequently confesses, almost in tears. He is later escorted to the roof, where a helicopter is scheduled to pick him up. Octavio's plan goes sour, after Jeter and Clayton Swain take on his troops, before freeing the remaining army staff, including Anita DuFine, Slattery and Meylan. Octavio attempts to escape, and uses Kelsi Baker as a human shield before she is shot dead by DuFine. On the roof, president Reiss knocks the explosives remote from the escorting soldier's hand before Meylan arrives and kills the soldier. He follows the president to the helicopter before Octavio arrives, and tries to kill the president, but Meylan shields him and is killed instead. Slattery arrives and takes down Octavio. The president and the survivors, pay tribute to the ones who were killed after the situation is over.
55	9	"Courage"	Peter Weller	Mark Malone & Katie Swain	November 4, 2018	1.13
Following the hostage situation at the Southern Command, the U.S. plans an invasion of Gran Colombia, headed by the navy and marines. They plan to enter at unguarded locations where the Colombian forces will not expect them. Navy and marine forces go to shore at the Red Beach, where they observe Barros' residence, heavily guarded. Danny Green and Carlton Burk keeps lookout at sea, but has to dive under when a Colombian Coast Guard vessel approaches. The Coast Guard picks up one of their trackers, but Green and Burk manage to take out the crew before they can sound the alarm. Burk is shot with a harpoon while investigating the vessel. Green comes to his aid, and shoots the shooter, revealed to be a little kid. He brings Burk to the deck, where he eventually dies in his arms. Around Barros' inner circle, generals plan a coup, with the majority of them voting for it when Hector Martinez asks about it. When arriving at dinner with Barros, he reveals that he had suspected that the generals were disloyal, and that they were plotting against him. He also reveals that he knows that Martinez was lying, thanks to his wife's cards. Despite trying to deny any knowledge of the coup, Martinez is killed, but manages to mutter Viva Tavo before dying.
56	10	"Commitment"	Steven Kane	Steven Kane	November 11, 2018	1.15
The United States's invasion of Colombia begins as the navy and marines land on the Red Beach, facing resistance from Colombian forces. The Nathan James assists for a brief period of time before it backs down due to risky firing range. After defeating the Colombian forces on the beach, the military moves in and starts heading inland, their goal to catch Barros. Cooper, Taylor, Kandie, Danny Green and some other navy soldiers also head inland in an attempt to locate Barros. They eventually reach his mansion, where they face resistance from remaining soldiers and locals. They make their way inside Barros' house, and take out his remaining guards. Cooper eventually finds his wife and son, before she and Kandie discover an injured Taylor. Cooper follows his hint, which leads her to a neighboring room, where Barros is. He demands to see Chandler, but doesn't get a response on his whereabouts. Danny Green also arrives in the room, but Barros refuses to surrender to anyone but Chandler, soldier to soldier. He tries to reach for his gun, but is shot dead by Cooper and Green. At sea, the Nathan James finds itself in its final moments as the unknown Iowa-class battleship attacks it from all angles. Captain Kara Green eventually comes to the realization, based on advice from Jeter to abandon ship, that she must give the order to do so. The ship is safely evacuated, with the exception of Chandler who stays behind. He locks the rudder and sets the sinking Nathan James on a heading directly into the side of the Iowa-class ship, at full speed, splitting it in two and sinking it, which the Nathan James also does. Chandler enters a dream-like state, where he is on board the James. He follows Rachel Scott to the helicopter bay, but enters the presidential office to talk to Tex before leaving. He tells him that if he stays, everything will be the same. In the helicopter bay, he is relieved of duty by former president Jeffrey Michener. When he asks who he will be handing the duty to, dead crew members rise from their chairs and say that they will take the watch. Chandler finds his peace, as he swims to the surface and is rescued by his crew, including Kara Green and Slattery, in a lifeboat.

== Ratings ==
The Last Ship : U.S. viewers per episode (millions)

Season	Episode number													Average
Season	1	2	3	4	5	6	7	8	9	10	11	12	13	Average
1	5.33	4.65	4.09	4.56	4.06	4.36	4.15	4.61	4.12	4.38	–			4.43
2	2.94	2.94	3.28	2.62	3.00	3.02	2.96	2.86	2.98	2.81	2.69	2.96	2.75	2.93
3	1.86	1.78	2.42	1.97	2.50	2.35	2.46	2.40	2.00	2.32	2.54	2.13	2.27	2.23
4	1.87	1.65	1.65	1.67	1.46	1.58	1.54	1.34	1.34	1.20	–			1.55
5	1.26	1.31	1.40	1.20	1.05	1.21	1.30	1.12	1.13	1.15	–			1.21

Audience measurement performed by Nielsen Media Research
