= Tactical Action Officer =

United States Navy position

The Tactical Action Officer (TAO) is a position in the U.S. Navy held by unrestricted line (URL) Surface Warfare Officers (SWO) on certain warships. They are responsible for the tactical decision-making and combat operations of a ship's combat information center (CIC).

== In popular culture ==
In the television series The Last Ship, the TAO was Commander Kara Green, played by Marissa Neitling for the majority of the series.

In the movie Greyhound, the XO Charlie Cole filled the role of TAO in the CiC.
