= Hope Olaide Wilson =

British actress, writer, director, and producer

Hope Olaidé Wilson
- Born: August 16, 1985 (age 40); United Kingdom
- Occupations: Actress, writer, director, producer
- Years active: 2006–present
- Website: www.hopewilson.com

Hope Olaidé Wilson (born 16 August 1985) is a British actress, writer, director, and multimedia producer. She is known for her roles in Spenser Confidential, The Last Ship, and The Fosters, and as the founder of Indigo Veil Media, a creative production company.

== Education ==
Wilson trained at the London Academy of Music and Dramatic Art (LAMDA).

== Career ==
Wilson began her screen career in 2006 with a role in Untold Stories of the ER. She gained wider recognition for her portrayal of Bertrise in The Last Ship (2014–2015), a character immune to the Red Flu virus. In 2017, she played Miranda “Diamond” Collins in The Fosters, appearing in four episodes.

Her film credits include I Can Do Bad All by Myself (2009), After the Dark (2013), Solace (2018), and Spenser Confidential (2020), where she played Letitia Graham.

=== Other work ===
Beyond acting, Wilson is a writer, director, and producer. She founded Indigo Veil Media, a company focused on multimedia storytelling. Her anthology project Owls & Echoes was selected for The Gotham's Screen Forward Lab. She has also been recognized with fellowships including the JJLA Octavia Butler Fellowship and was a finalist for the Sundance Episodic Lab.

== Selected filmography ==
- 2006: Untold Stories of the ER (TV episode)
- 2007: The Unit (TV episode: "The Outsiders")
- 2009: Life Is Hot in Cracktown
- 2009: I Can Do Bad All by Myself
- 2012: Southland (TV episode: "Identity")
- 2013: After the Dark
- 2014: CSI: NY (TV episode: "Today Is Life")
- 2014–2015: The Last Ship (16 episodes)
- 2015: Rosewood (TV episode: "Necrosis and New Beginnings")
- 2015: Criminal Minds (TV episode: "A Thousand Suns")
- 2016: Code Black (TV episode: "1.0 Bodies")
- 2017: The Fosters (4 episodes)
- 2017: The Price
- 2017: The Affair (TV episode: "308")
- 2018: Seven Seconds (TV episode: "That What Follows")
- 2018: Solace
- 2020: Spenser Confidential
