= Surface warfare insignia =

Badge of the United States Navy

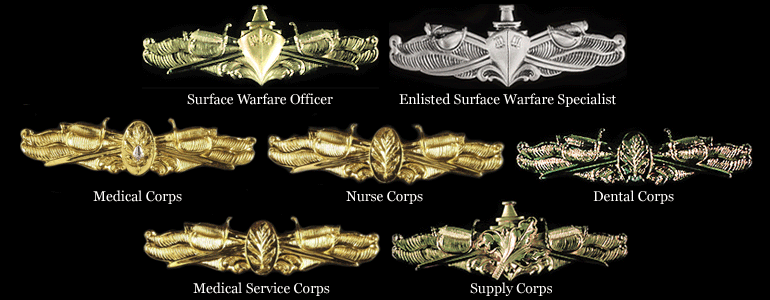
Surface Warfare insignias

The surface warfare insignia is a military badge of the United States Navy which is issued to U.S. Navy personnel who are trained and qualified to perform duties aboard United States surface warships. There are presently four classes of the surface warfare pin, being that of line, staff, special operations, and enlisted. The line and enlisted surface warfare badges may be earned by United States Coast Guard personnel assigned to Navy commands. The various badge types are as follows:

== Surface warfare officer ==
Surface Warfare Officer Insignia

The surface warfare officer insignia is the first milestone qualification an eligible commissioned officer may receive in surface warfare. This device is commonly called the "SWO pin" in the U.S. Navy. Those receiving the pin must qualify as officer of the deck (both underway and in port), small boat officer, combat information center watch officer, and must be trained in shipboard engineering, naval history, and damage control. For further, enterprise-level training, officers will attend Surface Warfare Officers' School (SWOS) in Newport, Rhode Island between all sea tours. The surface warfare officer badge is typically a prerequisite for tactical action officer (TAO) training.

Junior officers, typically Ensigns, assigned to the surface warfare community are known as "unqualified" or "1160s" until they receive qualification as a Surface Warfare Officer and receive the SWO pin. Surface line personnel who are not yet qualified have the 1160 officer designator: once qualified they receive the 1110 designator for Regular Navy Officers and 1115 for Navy Reserve Officers. Prior to 2018, junior officers were granted 24 months to qualify as Surface Warfare Officers; failing to do so within the time period meant either separation from the service or applying to transfer to another warfare community. The collisions involving the USS John S. McCain (DDG-56) and the USS Fitzgerald (DDG-62) brought about a change in qualification standards. Unqualified junior officers now have no official time limit to qualify within the two and a half years of their first tour, and now must qualify solely before they transfer to their next command. Failing to qualify prevents the officer from transferring. Officers who are separated from the SWO community go through a process called "Non-Attained" and this designation is entered into the officer's permanent military record.

The Surface Warfare Officer pin was designed to depict the traditional and typical elements of naval service: waves breaking before the bow of a ship overlaid on crossed U.S. Navy commissioned officer's swords, rendered in gold. The insignia was introduced in 1975.

== Enlisted Surface Warfare Specialist (ESWS) ==
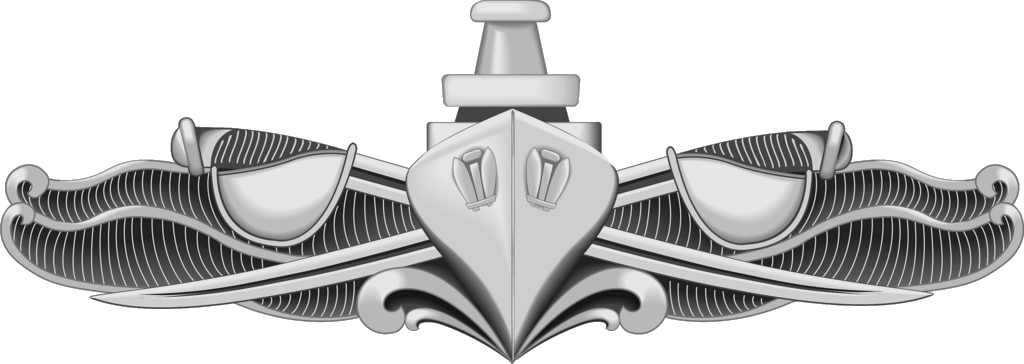
Enlisted Surface Warfare Specialist Insignia

After the SWO designation was introduced in 1975, clamor arose for an enlisted analog. In 1977, the surface warfare commanders (DCNO Surface Warfare, COMNAVSURFLANT and COMNAVSURFPAC) gave conceptual approval to the development of a surface enlisted qualification program. Initial guidelines for the program were:

1. It was to reflect a level of qualification above and beyond the normal level of professional and performance criteria necessary for advancement.
2. The qualification was applicable to and reasonably attainable by all "surface" ratings.
3. Qualification was an attainable goal for dedicated enlisted serving on ships and afloat staffs.
4. Management of the program would not become an administrative burden on the ship.
5. Qualification criteria would be well defined and specific.
6. Participation was voluntary, and there was neither a financial reward nor hazardous duty associated with the qualification.

On 1 December 1978, Chief of Naval Operations Admiral Thomas Hayward approved the enlisted surface warfare specialist (ESWS) qualification program. This approval was followed immediately by the promulgation of OPNAV Instruction 1412.4, which provided the specific details of the program.

The silver cutlass was available for the first time in April 1979. The criteria were:

1. Be a petty officer
2. Have 24 months on a surface ship
3. Have a performance mark and leadership marks of top 30% for CPO's and 3.4 for petty officers.
4. Complete the PQS for damage control, damage control petty officer, repair party leader, and work center supervisor.
5. Qualify in all watch stations for rating and pay grade.
6. Perform an oral board held by the commanding officer, executive officer or lieutenant commander.
7. Be recommended by the chain of command, and approved by the commanding officer.

OPNAVINST 1414.9 is the Navy instruction that governs the enlisted warfare qualification programs. This instruction also cancels OPNAVINST 1414.2A.

The ESWS pin is authorized for wear by any enlisted member of the United States Navy who is permanently stationed aboard a navy afloat command and completes the enlisted surface warfare qualification program and personal qualification standards (PQS). The ESWS badge can be obtained at any time after reporting to a ship. If in the paygrade of E-5 (petty officer 2nd class), it is a requirement for advancement to E-6 (petty officer 1st class). It is extremely uncommon for sailors in paygrade E-3 and below to earn their ESWS pin but strongly encouraged to stand among their peers for promotion. Sailors for whom ESWS is their secondary community (mostly those in the air warfare community) are not required to re-qualify.

An enlisted person who has qualified for their ESWS pin places the designator SW after their rate and rating; for example, Cryptologic Technician (Collection) Petty Officer Second Class Yefremov, having qualified for his ESWS pin, is identified as CTR2(SW) Yefremov.

Enlisted SWOs who are subsequently commissioned as officers replace their ESWS badge after they complete their Surface Warfare Officer qualifications.

Features of the pin

Unlike other warfare pins available to enlisted and officers, the ESWS and SWO pins differ by more than just color (gold for officers and silver for enlisted is a common theme in U.S. Navy uniforms). The blade weapons behind the hull on the SWO pin are swords, symbols of naval officers and their authority, while those on the enlisted pin represented the cutlasses issued to enlisted sailors for battle in days of sail. The ships on the pin represent "modern warships" of 1978.

The ESWS is 15/16 inch (24 mm) tall and 2.75 inches (70 mm) wide.

=== Updated ESWS requirements as of November 2020 ===
The new instruction will do away with the requirement for all first-tour Sailors to walk away from their first sea-duty command with their ESWS qualification. Sailors will not be required to enroll in a command's ESWS program until they reach a journeyman or master-level (E-5 - E-9). These Sailors will be enrolled in their ESWS program after 12 months onboard, or at the commanding officer's discretion, and from there will have 18 months to qualify in ESWS.

In attempts to improve damage control and ship survivability, the updated program will add more prerequisite PQS, including the following:

- Damage Control 301-312.
- Damage Control Watches 301, Sounding and Security.
- Ship's Maintenance and Material Management (3-M) Systems 301-303.

== Medical corps officer ==
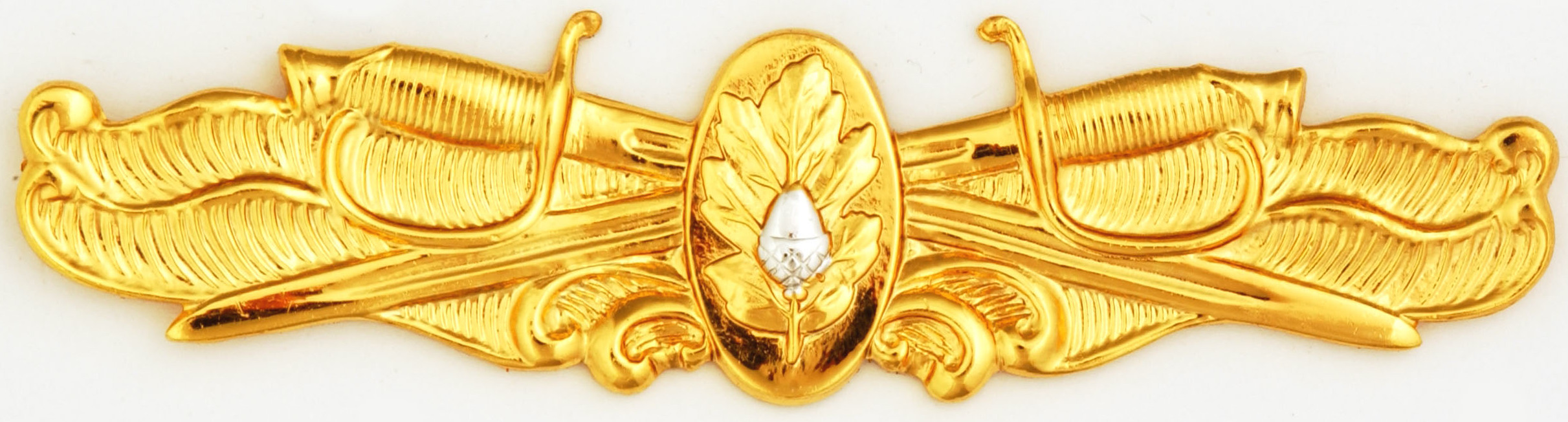
Medical corps officer insignia

Surface warfare medical corps insignia: A gold metal pin, with a spread oak leaf surcharged with a silver acorn on two crossed swords, on a background of ocean swells.

== Nurse corps officer ==
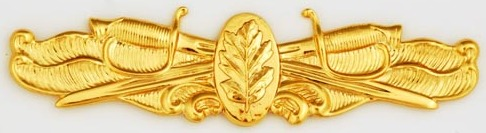
Nurse corps officer insignia

Surface warfare nurse corps insignia: A gold metal pin, with a spread oak leaf on two crossed swords, on a background of ocean swells.

== Dental corps officer ==
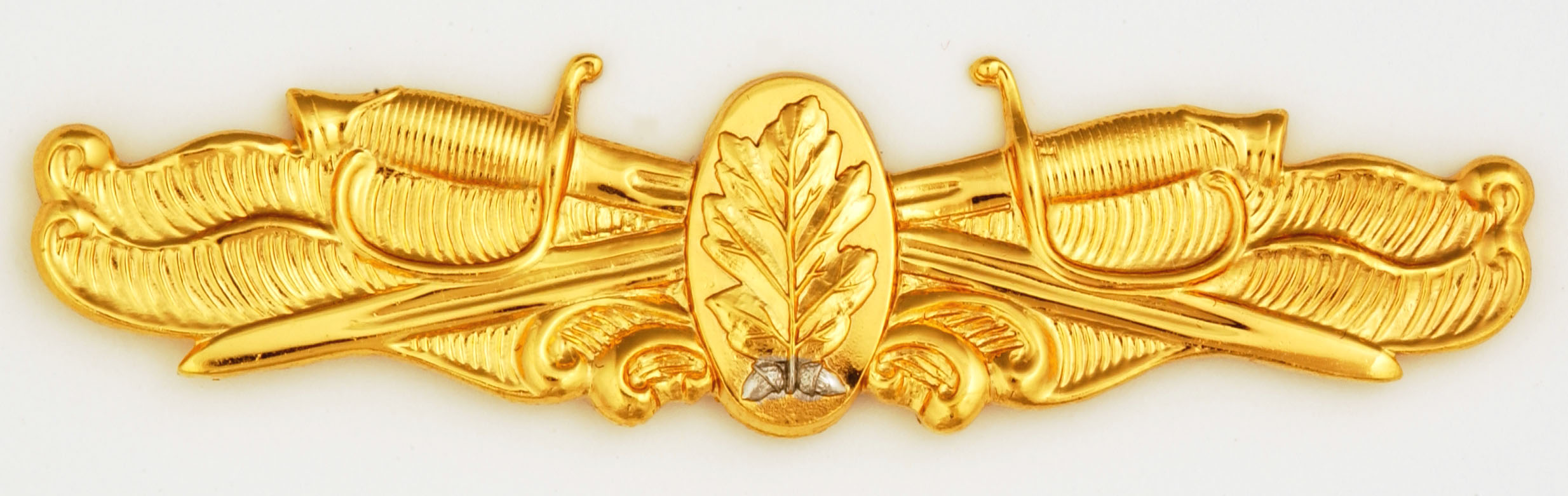
Dental corps officer insignia

Surface warfare dental corps insignia: A gold metal pin, with a spread oak leaf, a silver acorn on each side of the stem on two crossed swords, on a background of ocean swells.

== Medical service corps officer ==
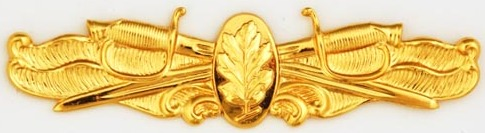
Medical service corps insignia

Surface warfare medical service corps insignia: A gold metal pin, with a spread oak leaf, attached to a slanting twig on two crossed swords, on a background of ocean swells.

== Supply corps officer ==
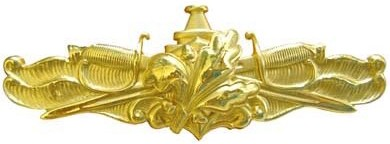
Surface Warfare Supply Corps Officer Insignia (SWSCO)

The surface warfare supply corps insignia is granted to those members of the Navy Supply Corps who qualify as surface warfare supply officers. Such officers are trained in shipboard supply systems, food service, housing and welfare service, disbursing operations, damage control, and basics of the ship's engineering systems. Post 2018 and the McCain and Fitzgerald collisions, SWSCO candidates and qualified officers do not stand Officer of the Deck (OOD) underway. Depending on the ship type, they will receive training in shipboard flight operations as the Helicopter Control Officer.

For advancement in the surface supply community, the Surface Warfare Supply Corps Officer pin (SWSCO) must be obtained by junior supply officers within 18 months from reporting on board a naval vessel. Those failing to qualify as a surface supply officer are transferred to permanent ground assignment as shore supply officers.

Other versions of the supply corps pin include the Naval Aviation Supply Corps insignia, the Submarine Supply Corps insignia and the Navy Expeditionary Supply Corps insignia.

== Surface chaplain officer ==
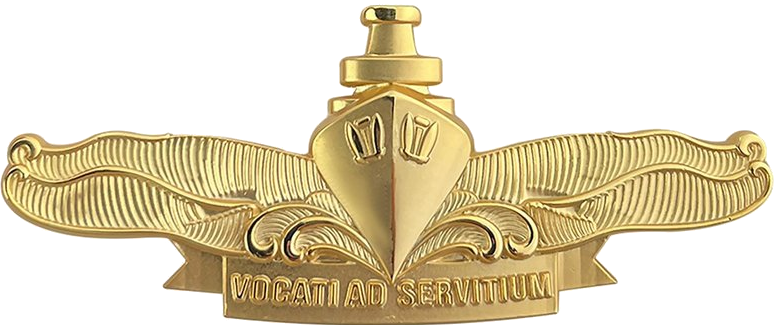
Surface Chaplain Officer Insignia

The Surface Chaplain Officer Qualification Insignia is a newly introduced warfare pin for members of the surface chaplain corps. The qualification insignia started being awarded to qualified chaplains in 2023 after being approved by the Navy Uniform Board.

== Coast Guard ==
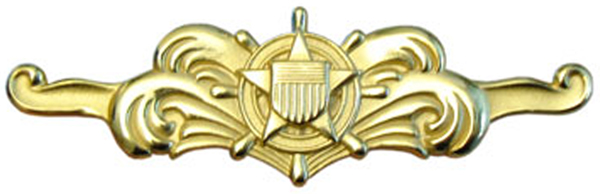
Cutterman insignia – officer

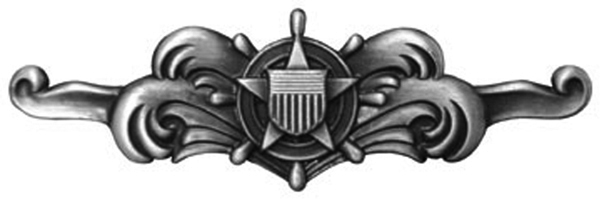
Cutterman insignia – enlisted

The United States Coast Guard does not issue the surface warfare pin. The comparable Coast Guard insignia is the cutterman insignia. The cutterman insignia is awarded on a temporary basis upon completion of a PQS. It is made permanent upon accumulation of five years sea time, a formal oral examination board, and positive endorsement from the Commanding Officer or Officer in Charge. The United States Coast Guard Auxiliary also issues a cutterman insignia to its members who complete a PQS, served aboard a cutter for no less than 52 days per year for two years, and receive a positive endorsement from the commanding officer or officer in charge.

Coast Guard personnel who are permanently cross-assigned to afloat Navy commands may qualify for the surface warfare badge through the standard Navy qualification system.

== NOAA Commissioned Corps ==
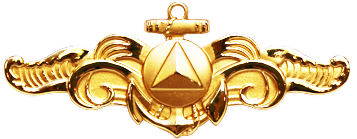
NOAA deck officer insignia

The NOAA Commissioned Corps deck officer pin is a gold-colored pin displaying breaking waves, with a central device consisting of a fouled anchor surcharged with a NOAA Corps device. NOAA Corps officers certified as senior watch officer may wear the NOAA deck officer insignia after authorization by the Director of the NOAA Corps.

== See also ==
- Badges of the United States Navy
- Badges of the United States Coast Guard
- Military badges of the United States
- Obsolete badges of the United States military
