= Sam Jacobs (basketball) =

American basketball player

Personal information
- Listed height: 6 ft 1 in (1.85 m)

Career information
- High school: Cherry Hill West (Cherry Hill, New Jersey)
- College: Cornell (1985–1988)
- Position: Guard

Career highlights
- First-team All-Ivy League (1988)

Sam Jacobs is an American former college basketball player. He played for the Cornell Big Red. While playing at Cornell, Jacobs was named to the 1987-88 All-Ivy League team. After his playing career, he was inducted into the Philadelphia Jewish Sports Hall of Fame and South Jersey Basketball Hall of Fame.

== High school career ==
Jacobs graduated from Cherry Hill High School West in Cherry Hill, New Jersey, in 1983.

== College career ==
Jacobs played three seasons at Cornell Big Red from 1985 to 1988. As a senior at Cornell in 1987–88, Jacobs started all 27 games and averaged 15.5 points, 3.2 rebounds, and 3.9 assists per game while being named to the 1987-88 All-Ivy League team. Jacobs also earned Ivy League Player of the Week three times and was named Cornell Team MVP in 1988.

In 1987–88, Jacobs was the leading scorer on a Cornell team that went 17–10, won the Ivy League regular season title and qualified for the 1988 NCAA Division I men's basketball tournament. At the 1988 NCAA tournament, they lost to Arizona 90–50 in the first round.

== Halls of fame ==
In 2015, Jacobs was inducted into the Philadelphia Jewish Sports Hall of Fame. A resident of Cherry Hill, New Jersey, he is a member of the Cherry Hill West Hall of Fame and was inducted into the South Jersey Basketball Hall of Fame in 2015.
