= Billy DeAngelis =

American basketball player

Personal information
- Born: October 5, 1946 (age 80)
- Listed height: 6 ft 1 in (1.85 m)
- Listed weight: 180 lb (82 kg)

Career information
- High school: Cherry Hill (Cherry Hill, New Jersey)
- College: Saint Joseph's (1965–1968)
- NBA draft: 1968: undrafted
- Playing career: 1968–1978
- Position: Point guard
- Number: 3
- Coaching career: 1971–1972

Career history

Playing
- 1968–1969: Trenton Colonials
- 1969–1971: Wilmington / Delaware Blue Bombers
- 1970: New York Nets
- 1971–1972: Cherry Hill Demons / Hazleton Hurricanes / Bits
- 1972–1973: Hamburg / Hazleton Bullets
- 1973–1974: Hamilton Pat Pavers
- 1974–1977: Hazleton Bullets
- 1977–1978: Wilkes-Barre Barons

Coaching
- 1971–1972: Cherry Hill Demons / Hazleton Hurricanes / Bits

Career highlights
- EBA champion (1978); 4× All-EBA Second Team (1972–1975)
- Stats at Basketball Reference

William R. DeAngelis (born October 5, 1946) is a retired American professional basketball player who spent one season in the American Basketball Association (ABA) with the New York Nets during the 1970–71 season. He attended Saint Joseph's University.

DeAngelis grew up in Cherry Hill, New Jersey and graduated in 1964 from what is now Cherry Hill High School West; he was later inducted into the school's athletic hall of fame.

DeAngelis also played baseball at Saint Joseph's, and was inducted into the school's baseball hall of fame in 2004, recognizing his accomplishments as a middle infielder who had a career batting average of .303 and set season and career records for triples.

DeAngelis played in the Eastern Professional Basketball League (EPBL) / Eastern Basketball Association (EBA) for the Trenton Colonials, Wilmington / Delaware Blue Bombers, Cherry Hill Demons / Hazleton Hurricanes / Bits, Hamburg / Hazleton Bullets, Hamilton Pat Pavers and Wilkes-Barre Barons from 1968 to 1978. He won an EBA championship with the Barons in 1978. He was selected to the All-EBA Second Team from 1972 to 1975. DeAngelis served as head coach of the Cherry Hill Demons / Hazleton Hurricanes / Bits during the 1971–72 season.
