= Scott Safran =

American video player

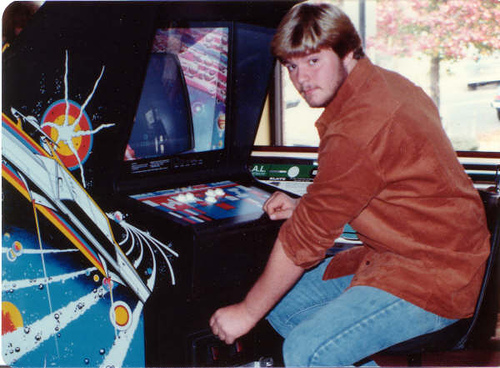
- Scott Safran about to beat the Asteroids world record

Personal information
- Born: August 19, 1967; Trenton, New Jersey, U.S.
- Died: March 27, 1989 (aged 21); Los Angeles, California, U.S.

Career information
- Games: Asteroids

Career highlights and awards
- Asteroids World Record (27 years)

Scott Safran (August 19, 1967 – March 27, 1989) was an American video gamer noted for setting the world-record score, which stood for 27 years, on the arcade game Asteroids.

== Background ==
Safran was born on August 19, 1967, to Mitch and Frann Safran in Trenton, New Jersey. As a teenager, he became interested in baseball, guitars, the Grateful Dead, and eventually arcade games. He was determined to break a world record on an arcade game, finally settling on Asteroids. He practiced throughout 1981 and for much of 1982, and was eventually able to carry a single game for nearly 20 hours at his local 7-Eleven convenience store, his first attempt to beat the existing world record. On November 13, 1982, at All-American Billiard Co. in Newtown, Pennsylvania, he again attempted to set a new world record for a single game of Asteroids and he succeeded. The game lasted approximately 60 hours. His final score was 41,336,440.

== Death ==
Safran graduated from Cherry Hill High School West in 1985 and moved to an apartment in Los Angeles, California, in 1987. On March 27, 1989, Safran died after falling three stories while trying to rescue his cat, Samson, from a ledge of his apartment building.

Unaware of Safran's death, Walter Day, an arcade referee who led Twin Galaxies, the official arcade scoreboard of the world, operating in Fairfield, Iowa, attempted to track down Safran in 1998 following the re-release of Asteroids. Day could not locate Safran, and asked newspapers and radio stations to ask people to help find him. Day personally offered a thousand dollars to whoever could locate Safran. Eventually, in April 2002, Day made contact with Safran's sister, Marci, and learned of Safran's death. In May 2002, a posthumous award ceremony was held in Philadelphia, Pennsylvania, to honor him, and family members received the award on his behalf.
