= Steven Kane (filmmaker) =

American screenwriter

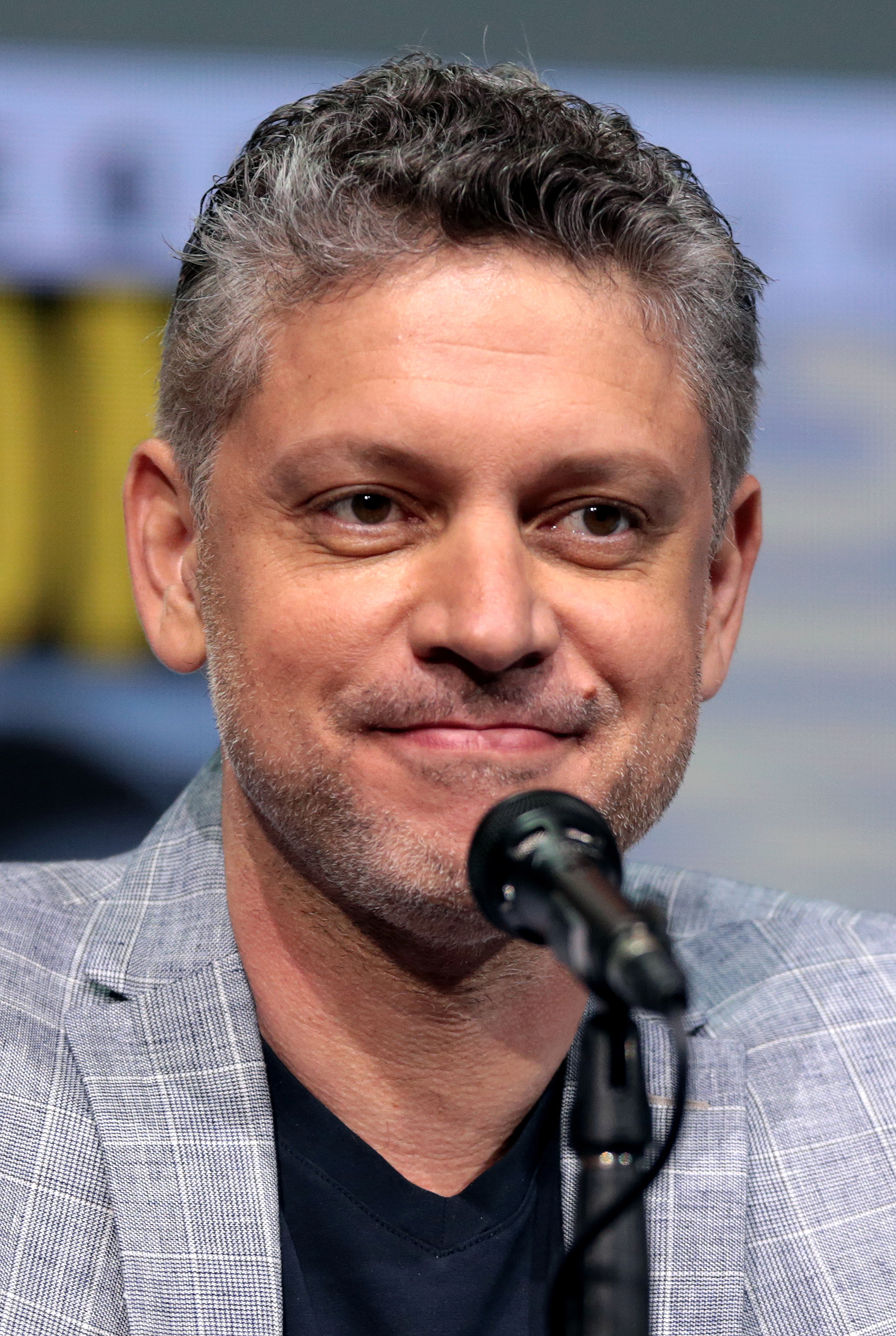
Steven Kane speaking at the 2017 San Diego Comic-Con in San Diego, California

Steven Kane is an American television and theater writer, producer and director.

== Personal life ==
Kane was born in Cherry Hill, New Jersey and graduated from Cherry Hill High School West. He majored in English and French at the University of Pennsylvania before attending graduate film school at the University of Southern California. His USC Master's Thesis, the short film "Heroic Symphony", garnered awards at film festivals around the country.

== Career ==
Kane got his start in the entertainment industry writing and directing independent film and theater. His first feature film, The Doghouse, won Best Director at the NY Indy Film Festival. His collection of one act plays, Out of Your Mind, had a successful run in Los Angeles at the GuerriLA Theater.

His television credits as a writer and producer include The Closer (for which he received an Edgar nomination), Major Crimes, Alias, NCIS, and Without a Trace, as well as comedies American Dad! and Curb Your Enthusiasm. He served as co-creator and executive producer of TNT's The Last Ship, a post-apocalyptic drama based on William Brinkley’s novel of the same name, which had its series finale in November 2018.

In 2016, Kane was given the Distinguished Public Service Award, the United States Navy's top civilian honor, for The Last Ship.

In March 2019, it was announced that Kane had joined the Paramount+ series Halo as showrunner. Kane wrote or co-wrote every episode of the first season of Halo.

While completing post-production on season 1 of Halo, Kane joined the Amazon Prime Video series Jack Ryan as showrunner for season 4.
