= Cherry Hill High School West =

Public high school in New Jersey, US

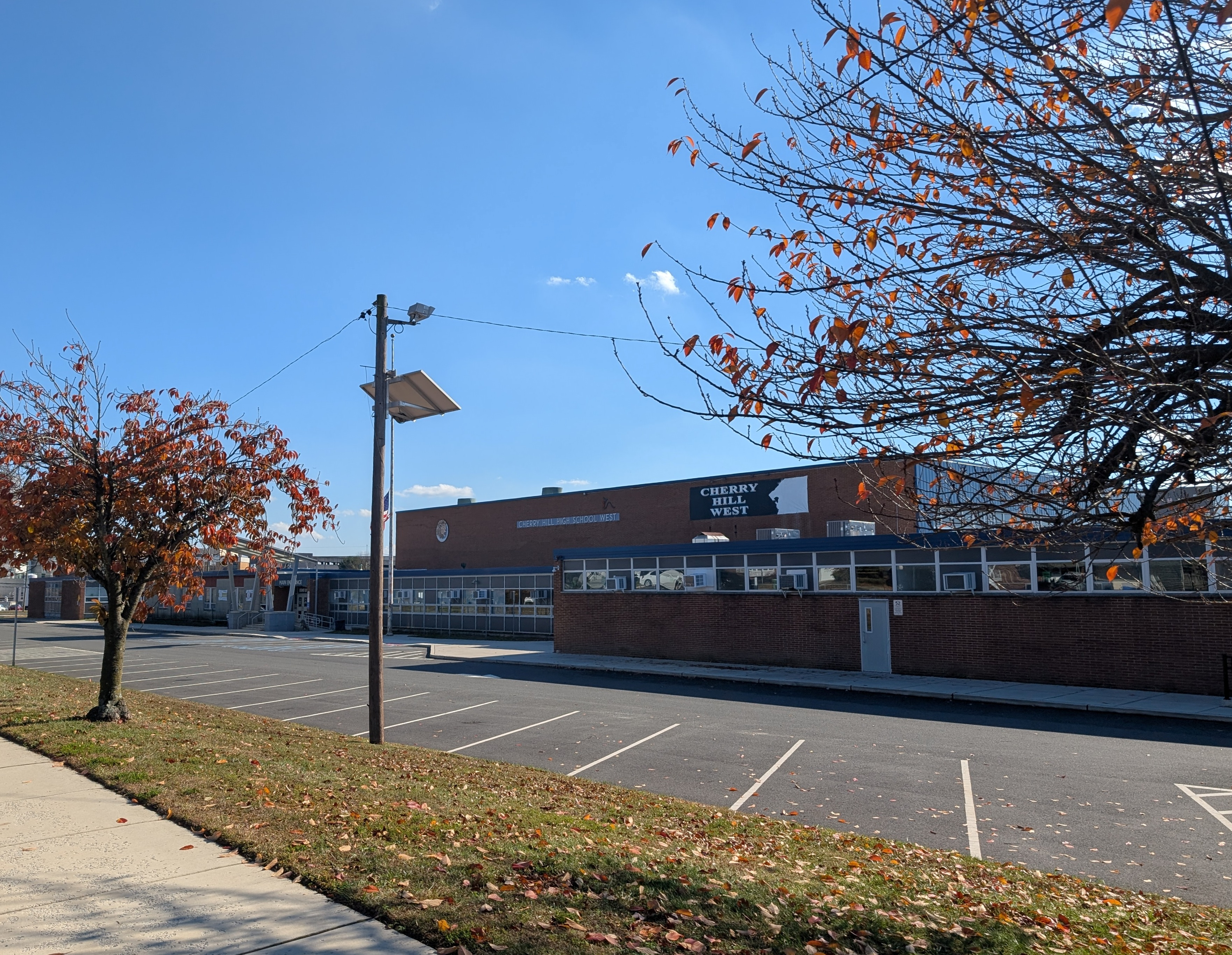
- Front of the school

Location
- 2101 Chapel Avenue; Cherry Hill, Camden County, New Jersey 08002; United States; 39.9288°N 75.020°W

Information
- Type: Public high school
- Established: 1956
- School district: Cherry Hill Public Schools
- NCES School ID: 340300001420
- Principal: John Burns
- Faculty: 106.0 FTEs
- Grades: 9-12
- Enrollment: 1,287 (as of 2024–25)
- Student to teacher ratio: 12.1:1
- Colors: Purple; White
- Athletics conference: Olympic Conference (general); West Jersey Football League (football)
- Team name: Lions
- Rival: Cherry Hill High School East
- Newspaper: The Lion's Roar
- Yearbook: The Rampant
- Website: west.chclc.org

Cherry Hill High School West (also known as Cherry Hill West or CHW) is a four-year comprehensive public high school serving ninth through twelfth grade in Cherry Hill, Camden County, in the U.S. state of New Jersey. It operates as part of the Cherry Hill Public Schools. Cherry Hill West is one of three high schools in the district; the others are Cherry Hill High School East and Cherry Hill Alternative High School.

As of the 2024–25 school year, the school had an enrollment of 1,287 students and 106.0 classroom teachers (on an FTE basis), for a student–teacher ratio of 12.1:1. There were 375 students (29.1% of enrollment) eligible for free lunch and 67 (5.2% of students) eligible for reduced-cost lunch.

== History ==
In May 1954, with enrollment exceeding the school's target of 1,000, the Haddonfield Public Schools notified the Delaware Township School District (since renamed the Cherry Hill Public Schools) that its students would no longer be accepted at Haddonfield Memorial High School after June 1956. While there were 420 Haddonfield students at the high school, there were 760 students as part of sending/receiving relationships, including about 200 from Delaware Township (now Cherry Hill).

Constructed on a 40-acre (16 ha) plot of land, Delaware Township High School opened in September 1956 for grades 7–9 students. Completed for $1.6 million (equivalent to $18.3 million in 2025), dedication ceremonies were conducted in November 1957 for the complex, which was built in four separate sections.

The school was renamed as Cherry Hill High School and adopted its current name for the 1966–67 school year with the opening of Cherry Hill High School East.

With delays in the construction of its new building, Cherry Hill East began the 1966–67 school year with 450 ninth-grade students attending split sessions at the original Cherry Hill High School. The new Cherry Hill East building opened in January 1967.

Cherry Hill High School West was an IB World School offering students the IB Diploma Programme from September 2000 to June 2008.

== Awards, recognition and rankings ==
In the 2011 "Ranking America's High Schools" issue by The Washington Post, the school was ranked 68th in New Jersey and 1,990th nationwide. The school was ranked 1534th nationwide, the 54th-highest in New Jersey, in Newsweek magazine's 2010 rankings of America's Best High Schools.

The school was the 161st-ranked public high school in New Jersey out of 339 schools statewide in New Jersey Monthly magazine's September 2014 cover story on the state's "Top Public High Schools", using a new ranking methodology. The school had been ranked 146th in the state of 328 schools in 2012, after being ranked 57th in 2010 out of 322 schools listed. The magazine ranked the school 96th in 2008 out of 316 schools. The school was ranked 126th in the magazine's September 2006 issue, which surveyed 316 schools across the state. Schooldigger.com ranked the school 144th out of 381 public high schools statewide in its 2011 rankings (a decrease of 36 positions from the 2010 ranking) which were based on the combined percentage of students classified as proficient or above proficient on the mathematics (83.7%) and language arts literacy (94.4%) components of the High School Proficiency Assessment (HSPA).

== Extracurricular activities ==
=== Sports ===
The Cherry Hill High School West Lions participate in the Liberty Division of the Olympic Conference, which is comprised of public and private high schools in Burlington, Camden and Gloucester counties, and operates under the supervision of the New Jersey State Interscholastic Athletic Association (NJSIAA). With 986 students in grades 10–12, the school was classified by the NJSIAA for the 2019–20 school year as Group III for most athletic competition purposes, which included schools with an enrollment of 761 to 1,058 students in that grade range. The football team competes in the National Division of the 94-team West Jersey Football League superconference and was classified by the NJSIAA as Group IV South for football for 2024–2026, which included schools with 890 to 1,298 students.

The Lions have played their home football games at the township stadium, Jonas C. Morris Stadium, which they have shared with Cherry Hill High School East. Annually, the Lions face their crosstown rival, the Cherry Hill East Cougars, on Thanksgiving morning, a rivalry described by The Philadelphia Inquirer as "one of the best in South Jersey", in which the winner of the contest receives the Al DiBart Memorial Trophy, also known as "The Boot." The Cherry Hill High School West Lions defeated the Cougars 8–0 in 2014, in the 46th game played in the series between the two teams, Cherry Hill West led 31–15.

Cherry Hill High School West students participate in an independent club ice hockey team affiliated with the South Jersey High School Ice Hockey League; this team is not a school-sponsored athletic group. Every Wednesday night before Thanksgiving, the "Cherry Hill West" Ice Hockey Club plays the "Cherry Hill East" Ice Hockey Club for the Golden Skate Award.

The boys' bowling team won the overall state championship in 1964. Cherry Hill West had one of the best bowling teams in South Jersey, going 72-3-1 in the 2006–07 season, led by Coach Irv Wolf.

The boys' baseball team won the South Jersey Group IV state sectional championship in 1967 and 1968. The team won the Group IV state championship in 1989 vs. West Milford High School, in 1990 vs. Hoboken Junior Senior High School and in 1992 vs. Elizabeth High School, and the Group III title in 1991 vs. High Point Regional High School. The 1989 team finished the season with a record of 24-1-1 after defeating West Milford by a score of 11–3 in the championship game at Princeton University to earn the Group III state title.

The girls' field hockey team won the South I state sectional championship in 1972 and 1973, and was state champion in 1973.

The girls' swim team won the Division A state championship in 1974, the Public B championship in 1998, and the Public A title in 2000 and 2006. The boys' swim team won the Division B state championship in 1987 and 1988. Cherry Hill High School West was the girls' state swimming champions in 2006, taking the title with a 102–68 victory in the tournament final meet over Westfield High School. The boys' swim team won the 2006 South Jersey Public A division title after an error made by the Cherry Hill East swim team in one of the events led the NJSIAA to overturn the initial result and hand the sectional title to Cherry Hill West. Cherry Hill High School West was the 2007 boys' state swimming champions. The team won the South A state sectional title with a 90–80 win over crosstown rival Cherry Hill High School East. The boys' swim team moved on to win the 2007 Group A state championship with an 89–81 win versus Westfield High School. The girls' swim team won the 2007 South Jersey Public A division title over Cherry Hill East by a score of 98–72.

The girls' tennis team won the South sectional title in 1974 and the Group III state title in 1987 (defeating Sparta High School in the tournament's final match). The 1987 team won the Group III title with a 3–2 win against Sparta in the tournament finals.

The boys' cross country team won the NJSIAA Group IV South sectional championship in 1974 and team member Marty Ludwikowski was Group IV state champion and individual winner of the Meet of Champions.

=== Mock trial ===
Cherry Hill West's mock trial team won the state mock trial championship in 1986, becoming the first competition winner from Camden County. Also, in 2016, the West mock trial team won the South Jersey championship.

=== Vocal program ===
The West choral program consists of audition choirs (Chansons, Concert Choir and West Singers), a beginner choir (Vocal Workshop) and three extracurricular choirs (Chamber Singers, Fermata and Men of Note). The Symphonic Choir had the honor of performing with the Haddonfield Symphony under the direction of maestro Alan Gilbert in 1994. The two groups performed Leonard Bernstein's Chichester Psalms. The vocal group West Singers has been invited to sing at many ACDA National Conventions and often has the highest number of students get into All State, All Eastern and All National Chorus. They were invited to sing at the Walt Disney Concert Hall in Los Angeles. West music program made a trip to Boston, Massachusetts on April 12–15, 2007, with all choirs receiving Superior ratings. Other recognitions include Best of High School a cappella 2006, 2007, and 2008 (Champions- Men of Note '06,'07,'08 Finals- Fermata '05) and many tracks on the Best of High School a cappella CDs. The most popular performance of the year was Broadway Night, a show dedicated to well-known musicals, television theme songs and famous commercials. Christine Bass, West choral director for 22 years, was featured on the cover of the September 2007 issue of Choral Director magazine.

Famous graduates of the West Vocal Program include Aaron Lazar, who has gone on to star in the Broadway hit, The Light in the Piazza, and performed the role of Enjolras in the Broadway revival of Les Misérables.

Men of Note

- Includes 11 men
- The only group to win ICHSA three times in a row (2006, 2007, 2008)
- Member Kurt Knecht (2006 - 2008) is a Semi-Finalist in the reality show for the cast of "High School Musical 4"

Accomplishments (2006)

- 2006 ICHSA International Champions - Best of High School A Cappella - Men of Note
- Best of High School A Cappella 2006 CD - West Singers
- 14 Superior Ratings - All Choirs
- 3 Perfect Scores - West Singers
- Exemplary Rating in Sight Singing - Chamber Singers
- Overall Best Choir Award - Music In the Parks - West Singers
- 2006 Cruise Festival Overall Grand Championship Award for Mixed Choir Class AAA - Combined Choirs (60 Cruise Festivals)
- 2006 Cruise Festival Overall Grand Championship Award for Madrigal Choir - Chamber Singers (60 Cruise Festivals)
- Top Number in 2005 All State Chorus (19)
- Top Number in 2006 American Choral Directors Assoc. All Eastern Chorus (12)

Accomplishments (2007)
Festivals of Music - Boston 2007 Results

- West Symphonic Choir - Superior, 1st place in Class A Mixed Chorus
- Fermata - Superior, 1st place in Women's Chorus
- Men of Note - Superior, 1st place in Men's Chorus
- Chamber Singers - Superior, 1st place in Madrigal Choir (293/300 points)
- West Singers - Superior, 1st place in Class AA Mixed Chorus (295/300 points)

With 23 choirs competing from 8 different high schools, the Cherry Hill West Choirs were the only choirs to receive superior ratings from the three judges.

Chamber Singers won the "Best Overall Choir" for all the 13 non-mixed choirs competing and West Singers won the "Best Overall Choir" for all the 10 Mixed Choirs competing.

- 2008 ICHSA International Champions - Best of High School A Cappella - Men of Note

=== Instrumental program ===
The West instrumental program includes the Wind Ensemble, Symphonic Band, Orchestra, and Jazz Band.

Festivals of Music - Boston 2007 Results

- West Combined Bands - 3rd Place Excellent Rating
- West Jazz Ensemble - 2nd Place Excellent Rating
- West String Ensemble - 1st Place Excellent Rating
- Best Overall High School Orchestra

Other accomplishments

In spring 2005 in Virginia Beach, the group captured 1st Place at a North American Music Festivals competition and received a Superior Rating.

In 2006, Jazz Band placed 2nd at a Music In The Parks festival at Dorney Park & Wildwater Kingdom.

Cherry Hill West has also produced many musicals over the years including Mary Poppins (2015), In the Heights (2014), Grease (2013), The Wedding Singer (2012), Hairspray (2011), The Wizard of Oz (2010), Bye Bye Birdie (1983, 1997, 2009), Oliver! (2008), Cabaret (2007), Footloose (2006), Hello, Dolly! (1981, 2005), West Side Story (1984, 2004), The Music Man (2003), The Wiz (2002), Annie (2001), Guys and Dolls (2000), Fiddler on the Roof (1999), Anything Goes (1998), and Oklahoma! (1996). In 2025, West was one of only twelve schools in the U.S. to be chosen to receive the inaugural Suffs “The Young Are at the Gates” Grant from The Educational Theatre Foundation (ETF) and Music Theatre International (MTI), which pays for West to produce the musical, Suffs, in its first year of licensing availability.

=== Marching band ===
The school's marching band was Tournament of Bands Chapter One Champions in 1992 and was Group 2 and USSBA regional champions in 2002, Group 1 Open.

== Administration ==
The school's principal is John Burns, whose administration team includes four assistant principals.

== Notable alumni ==
- Sherry Coben (1953–2024), creator of the 1980s situation comedy Kate & Allie
- Billy DeAngelis (born 1946; class of 1964), retired American professional basketball player who played in the American Basketball Association with the New York Nets
- Eric Dezenhall (born 1962, class of 1980), author of novels including Money Wanders and Shakedown Beach
- Andrea Dworkin (1946–2005, class of 1964), feminist author
- Siggy Flicker (born 1967), television personality and matchmaker who has appeared on The Real Housewives of New Jersey
- Rick Folbaum (born 1969, class of 1987), former anchor on Fox News Channel
- Harrison Hand (born 1998), American football cornerback for the Minnesota Vikings
- Lauren Hart (born 1967, class of 1985), professional singer
- John Hobbs (born 1956), professional baseball player who pitched for the Minnesota Twins
- Billy Hunter (born 1942), former wide receiver who played in the NFL for the Washington Redskins and Miami Dolphins, and former executive director of the National Basketball Players Association
- Sam Jacobs (class of 1983), basketball player who played for the Cornell Big Red
- Adam Jasinski (born 1978), winner of Big Brother 9
- Steven Kane, television and theater writer, producer and director
- Ali Larter (born 1976), actress who has appeared in Heroes and on film in Legally Blonde
- Aaron Lazar (born 1976), Broadway actor who has appeared on the stage in A Tale of Two Cities and Les Misérables
- Dave Lischner (born 1962), retired soccer player who played professionally in the Major Indoor Soccer League
- J. J. Picollo (born 1970), professional baseball executive who is the general manager and president of baseball operations for the Kansas City Royals
- Scott Safran (1967–1989), holder of the world record for the highest score in the game Asteroids, the longest-standing arcade game record
