= Lauren Hart (American pop singer) =

American singer (born 1967)

Lauren Hart (born January 10, 1967) is a pop American singer, best known for singing the American and Canadian national anthems prior to Philadelphia Flyers games, the team for which her father Gene Hart was the long-time television and radio announcer for 29 years, and also performing a duet of "God Bless America" with a taped version of Kate Smith on several occasions, especially big games, among them games in the 2010 Stanley Cup Finals. When the 2004–05 season was cancelled because of a lockout, Hart was able to continue her duties with the Flyers AHL affiliate, the Philadelphia Phantoms. In a 2005 Hockey News poll, she was voted the best anthem singer in NHL history.

Hart grew up in Cherry Hill, New Jersey and graduated in 1984 from Cherry Hill High School West.

Hart graduated from Thomas Edison State University in 1996 with a bachelor's degree in music.

Hart performed "God Bless America" during the first intermission of the 2012 NHL Winter Classic at Citizens Bank Park on January 2, 2012.

Hart is married to Todd Carmichael, Co-founder of Philadelphia-based La Colombe.
