= Todd Carmichael =

American entrepreneur and television personality (born 1963)

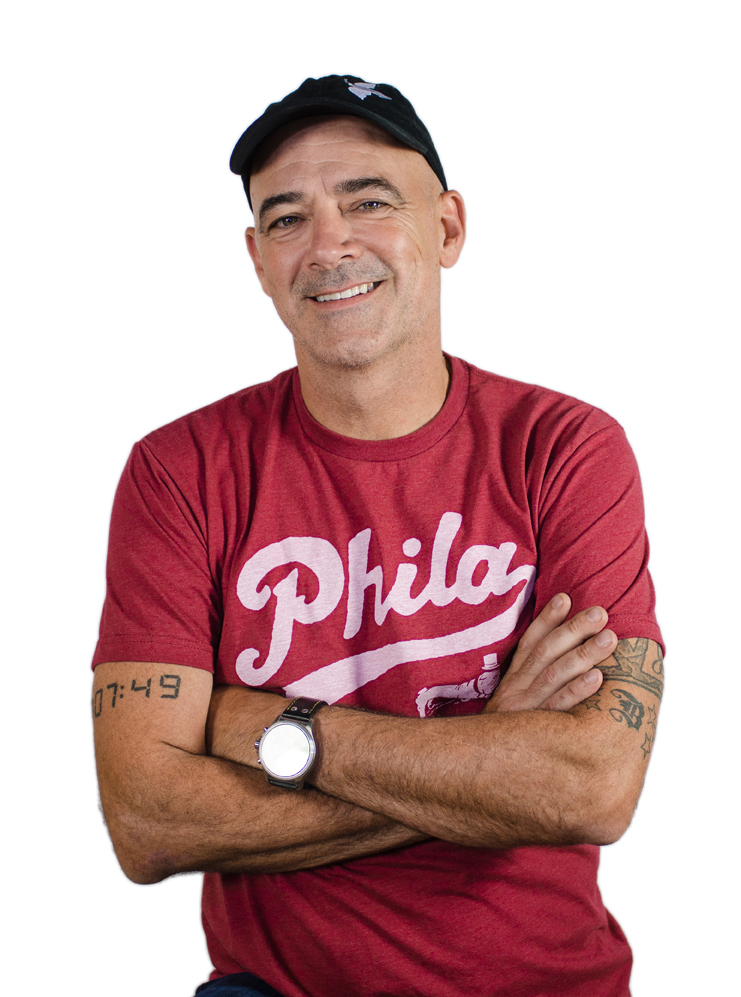
- Todd Carmichael, co-founder and CEO of La Colombe Torrefaction
- Born: August 30, 1963 (age 63); Spokane, Washington, U.S.
- Education: University of Washington
- Known for: CEO and Co-Founder of La Colombe, Host of Travel Channel's Dangerous Grounds, Antarctic Solo Exploration/World Speed Record, Philanthropist
- Spouse: Lauren Hart
- Website: toddcarmichael.com lacolombe.com

Todd Carmichael (born August 30, 1963) is an American entrepreneur, adventure traveler, philanthropist, television personality, author, and inventor. Carmichael is the CEO and co-founder of Philadelphia-based La Colombe.

He is the first American to complete a solo trek across Antarctica to the South Pole on foot with no assistance, claiming the world speed record with a total travel time of 39 days, 7 hours and 49 minutes. Recorded footage of his trek later became an award-winning documentary entitled Race to the Bottom of the Earth (2010) that was aired on the National Geographic Channel. He then went on to raise thousands of dollars for Orangutan Foundation International, one of his numerous philanthropic projects.

Carmichael was ranked #1 by Food Republic for the most influential figure in its Coffee Power Ranking. He is currently the host of Travel Channel's 'Dangerous Grounds and Uncommon Grounds'.

== Early life and education ==
Todd Carmichael was born on August 30, 1963, outside Spokane, Washington. He has three sisters. Carmichael completed his first marathon at age 15. His mother eventually moved the family to Spokane's South Hill so that he could attend Joel E. Ferris High School.

From 1981 to 1982, he was part of Ferris' state championship squad. He graduated from high school in 1982, and received a distance running scholarship to the University of Washington, where he studied business and went on to work in accounting for Ernst & Young. He also ran his first ultramarathon at the age of 20.

== Career ==
While hunting for beans, he came upon a farm that inspired him to want to help Haiti improve its coffee farming methods. He was later approached by the Clinton Foundation to collaborate on a coffee project.

Carmichael was a prolific contributor to Esquire's "Eat Like a Man" blog, where he covered subjects mainly related to coffee, its industry, and his travels in Haiti and the country's issues. He has also written for Huffington Post regarding topics about the environment and animal rights. He is currently the host of Travel Channel's Dangerous Grounds.

== Philanthropy ==
Carmichael has collaborated with the actor Leonardo DiCaprio to create La Colombe's Lyon blend, with proceeds going to fund the Leonardo DiCaprio Foundation.

Working with ECHOES Around the World in Uganda and Wide Horizons For Children in Ethiopia, Project Afrique was also made possible through the sales of La Colombe and additional funding from the coffee-roasting company and his partner, J.P. Iberti. Carmichael also collaborated with the organization Coffee For Water to bring safe drinking water into coffee-growing regions.

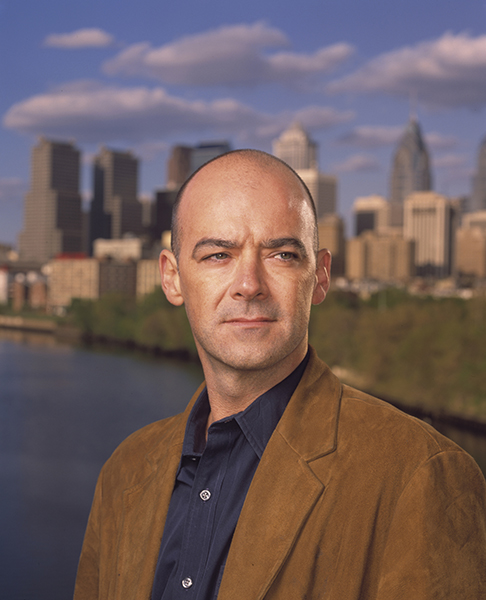
Todd Carmichael, La Colombe founder, with the Philadelphia skyline, 2002
