= Marissa Neitling =

American actress (born 1984)

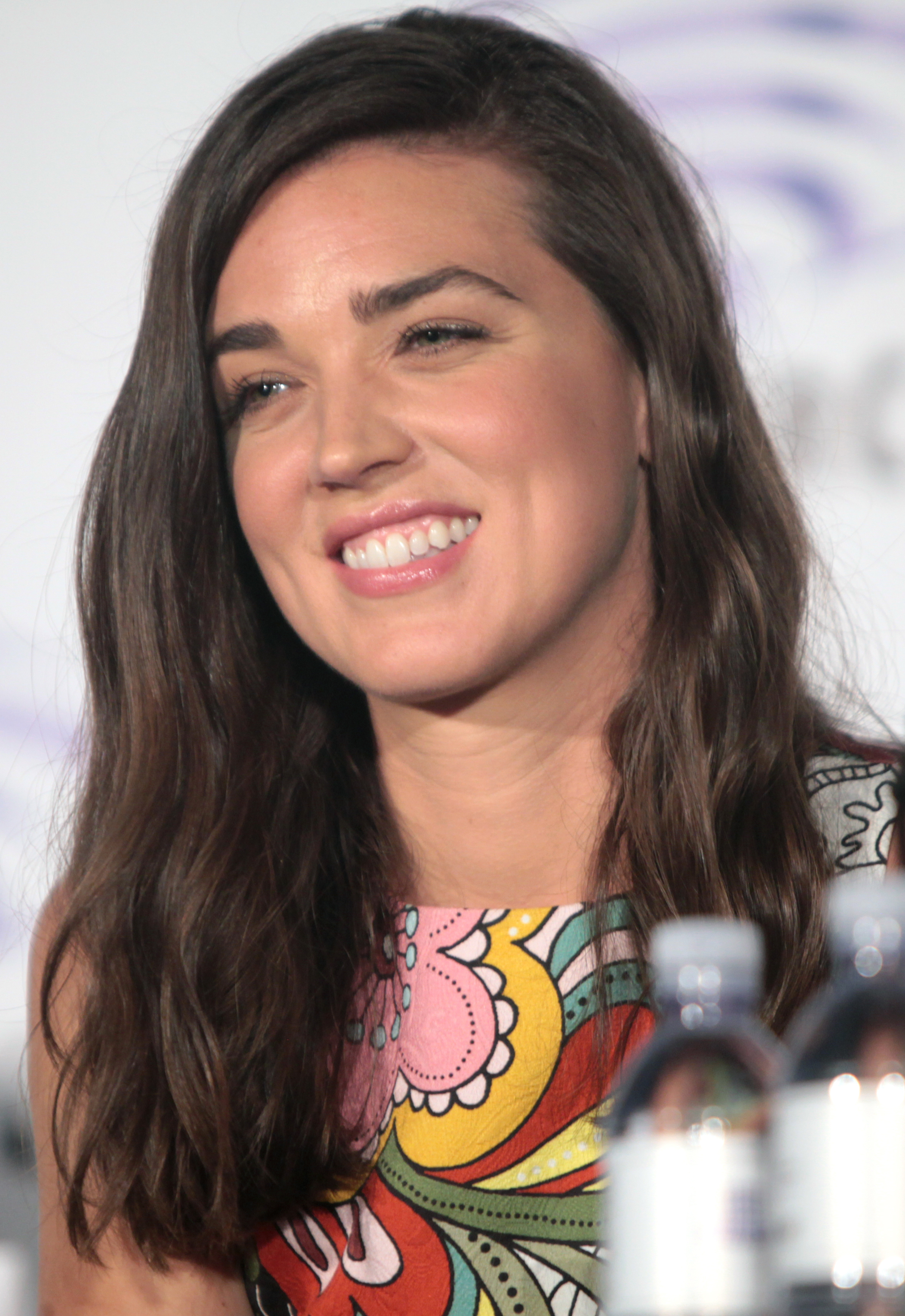
- Neitling at WonderCon in 2016.
- Born: Marissa Lee Neitling; May 8, 1984 (age 41); Lake Oswego, Oregon, U.S.
- Education: University of Oregon (BA); Yale University (MFA)
- Occupation: Actress
- Years active: 2002–present
- Known for: The Last Ship; San Andreas

Marissa Lee Neitling (born May 8, 1984) is an American actress, known for her roles in the TV series The Last Ship (2014-2018) as Kara Foster, and the film San Andreas (2015) as Phoebe.

== Early life ==
Neitling was born in Lake Oswego, Oregon as Marissa Lee Neitling to Joy and Stanley Neitling. She has a younger sister named Mackenzie Neitling. Neitling graduated from Lake Oswego High School in 2002. She went on to get her undergraduate degree at University of Oregon where she was also in the Honors College. Neitling is an avid Oregon Ducks fan. She was a double major in Math and Theater Arts. Neitling went on to earn an MFA in acting from the Yale School of Drama.

== Career ==
In 2007, Neitling made a brief appearance in The Go-Getter. In 2011, Neitling was cast in a guest role spot on the hit series Leverage as Christina Valada / Lacey Beaumont. In 2014, she landed the role as Lt. Kara Foster on TNT summer series The Last Ship. In 2015, after sending in an audition tape, she was cast as Phoebe in the Dwayne Johnson-led film, San Andreas.

== Filmography ==
=== Film ===
Year	Title	Role	Notes
2007	The Go-Getter	Crying Girl	
2015	San Andreas	Phoebe	
2016	Mysterious Ways	Jennie	Short film
2021	Last Words	Leah	

=== Television ===
Year	Title	Role	Notes
2011	Leverage	Christina Valada / Lacey Beaumont	1 episode
2014–2018	The Last Ship	LT/LCDR/CDR Kara Foster/Green	54 episodes; Main Cast
2018	Elementary	Nina Hudgins / Skyler	1 episode
2018-2019	Madam Secretary	Annelies De Runnow	2 episodes
