= The Last Ship (TV series) =

American television series

- Genre: Post-apocalyptic; Action drama
- Created by: Hank Steinberg; Steven Kane
- Based on: The Last Ship by William Brinkley
- Starring: Eric Dane; Rhona Mitra; Adam Baldwin; Charles Parnell; Travis Van Winkle; Marissa Neitling; Christina Elmore; Jocko Sims; John Pyper-Ferguson; Bridget Regan; Bren Foster; Kevin Michael Martin; Emerson Brooks; Fay Masterson; Jodie Turner-Smith; Hiroyuki Sanada; Grace Kaufman
- Theme music composer: Steve Jablonsky
- Composer: Nathan Whitehead
- Country of origin: United States
- Original language: English
- No. of seasons: 5
- No. of episodes: 56 (list of episodes)

Production
- Executive producers: Michael Bay; Jack Bender; Andrew Form; Brad Fuller; Hank Steinberg; Steven Kane; Jonathan Mostow
- Producers: Todd Arnow; Eric Dane; Mark Malone
- Cinematography: Lukas Ettlin
- Editor: Ken Blackwell
- Running time: 45 minutes
- Production companies: Channel Road Productions; Platinum Dunes; TNT Original Productions (seasons 1–3); Studio T (from season 4)

Original release
- Network: TNT
- Release: June 22, 2014 – November 11, 2018

The Last Ship is an American action drama television series, loosely based on the 1988 novel by William Brinkley. The series premiered on TNT on June 22, 2014, and concluded after five seasons on November 11, 2018.

== Premise ==
After a global viral pandemic wipes out over 80% of the world's population, the 218-person crew of an unaffected U.S. Navy Arleigh Burke-class guided missile destroyer, the fictional USS Nathan James (DDG-151), must try to find a cure and save humanity.

== Episodes ==
Season	Episodes	Originally released	
Season	Episodes	First released	Last released
1	10	June 22, 2014	August 24, 2014
2	13	June 21, 2015	September 6, 2015
3	13	May 30, 2016	September 11, 2016
4	10	August 20, 2017	October 8, 2017
5	10	September 9, 2018	November 11, 2018

== Cast ==
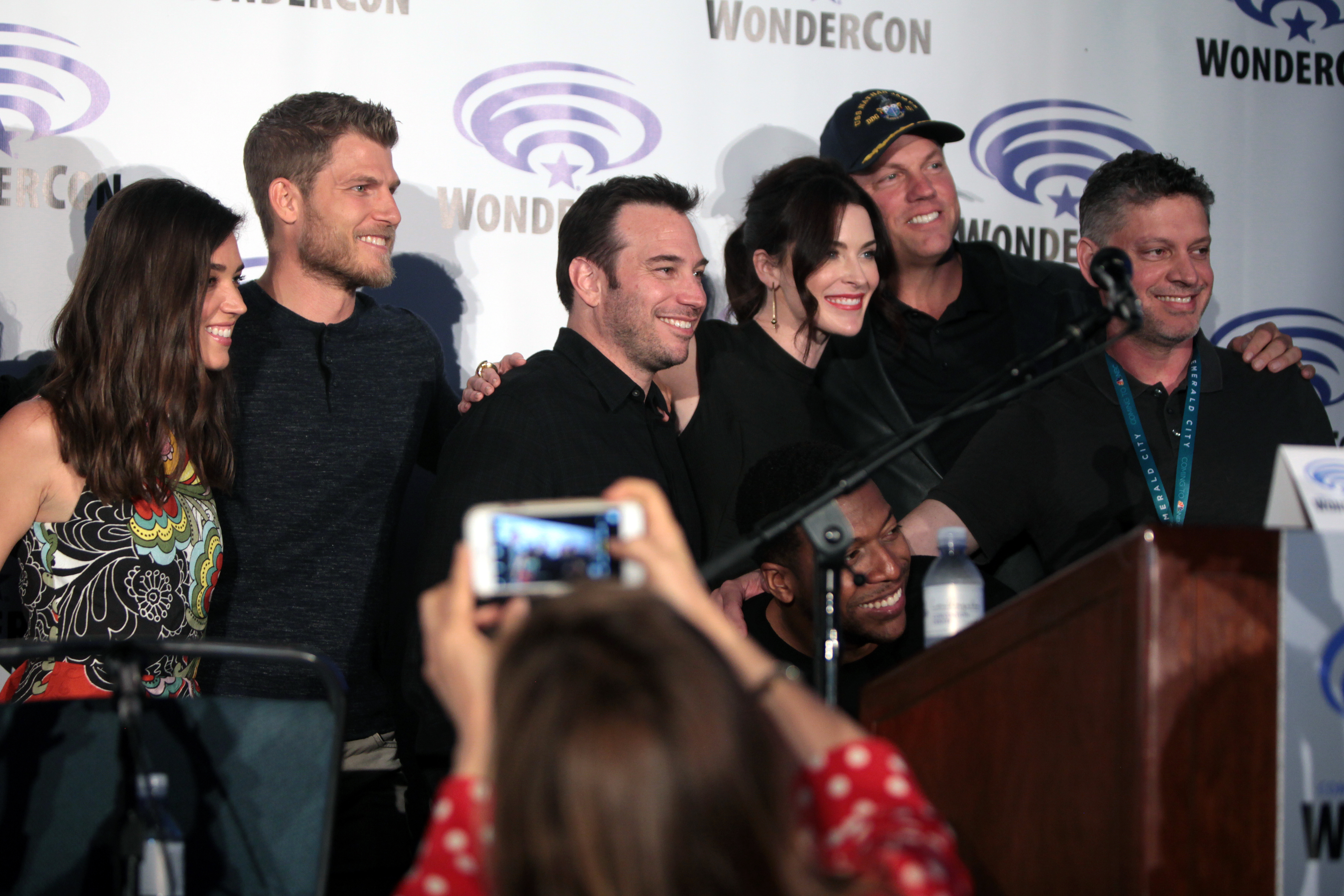
Series' cast and crew, Season 3 (2016)

- Eric Dane as Commander, later Captain, and finally Admiral Tom Chandler, is the former commanding officer of USS Nathan James and chief of naval operations, and instructor at the United States Naval Academy.
- Rhona Mitra as Dr. Rachel Scott, a paleomicrobiologist who created the vaccine to prevent infection by the virus.
- Adam Baldwin as Commander, later Captain, and finally Admiral Mike Slattery, is the former executive officer and later commanding officer of Nathan James and chief of naval operations. Originally from Chicago, he previously served as a homicide detective with the Chicago Police Department. His wife's name is Christine, and she is played by Ele Keats. He has a son and two daughters.
- Charles Parnell as Master Chief Petty Officer of the Navy Russell "Russ" Jeter. He previously served as senior enlisted sailor and unofficial chaplain for the Nathan James.
- Travis Van Winkle as Lieutenant Daniel Joshua "Danny" Green. The leader of the Naval Mountain Warfare Special Forces Unit aboard Nathan James. In season 5, Danny was a member of Delta Team, a four-man covert-action team.
- Marissa Neitling as Commander Kara Foster. She started the series as a combat information center officer on Nathan James and is later designated tactical action officer (TAO). During season 3, Kara worked in St. Louis as deputy chief of staff to President Michener. In season 4, she returned to duty onboard Nathan James as the TAO. In season 5, she became the commanding officer of Nathan James.
- Christina Elmore as Lieutenant Commander Alisha Granderson is an officer of the deck on Nathan James. In season 5, she is serving at Naval Station Mayport under Admiral Meylan.
- John Pyper-Ferguson as Ken "Tex" Nolan. A private security / military contractor and former U.S. Army Special Forces soldier who joined the crew at Guantanamo Bay detention camp. He has an ex-wife and an adult daughter.
- Jocko Sims as Commander Carlton Burke. Head of Nathan James visit, board, search, and seizure (VBSS) teams. In season 5, he is promoted to executive officer of Nathan James.
- Kevin Michael Martin as Chief Gunner's Mate Eric Miller. A member of the ship's VBSS teams who has worked his way up the enlisted ranks.
- Bren Foster as Chief Petty Officer Wolf "Wolf-Man" Taylor. Member of the Royal Australian Navy CDT 3 (Special Forces) attached to the US Navy Special Warfare Joint Operations Training Program. In season 5, Wolf is a member of Delta Team, a four-man covert-action team.
- Bridget Regan as Sasha Cooper. A former Navy Intelligence Officer now operating under diplomatic cover in China for the newly reformed US government. She was once romantically involved with Tom Chandler. In season 5, Sasha is a member of Delta Team.
- LaMonica Garrett as Lieutenant Commander Cameron Burk. The brother of CDR Carlton Burk. During season 3, he is the TAO of USS Nathan James.
- Fay Masterson as Captain Andrea Garnett. Commanding officer of the USS Jeffrey Michener. Garnett previously served as chief engineer and later executive officer of the Nathan James.
- Emerson Brooks as Admiral Joseph Meylan. At the beginning of the series, he is a commanding officer of USS Hayward. He soon joins Nathan James. Later he briefly takes command of Nathan James, as ordered to by the St. Louis White House. During season 4, he becomes the executive officer of USS Nathan James under Captain Mike Slattery. In season 5, he is assigned to Naval Station Mayport as a flag officer.
- Jodie Turner-Smith as Sergeant Azima Kandie. She served in the Kenyan Navy for two years. During season 4, she is part of the VBSS teams on Nathan James. In season 5, Kandie is a member of Delta Team.

=== Guests ===
- Elizabeth Ann Bennett
- Patrick Brennan
- Jose Pablo Cantillo
- Fernando Chien
- Jade Chynoweth
- Maurice Compte
- Steven Culp
- Sibylla Deen
- Ayako Fujitani
- Caitlin Gerard
- H. Richard Greene
- Jamie Gray Hyder
- Ravil Isyanov
- April Parker Jones
- Ele Keats
- Dichen Lachman
- Brooke Langton
- Costas Mandylor
- Deborah May
- Mark Moses
- Ebon Moss-Bachrach
- Brían F. O'Byrne
- Jacqueline Obradors
- Jade Pettyjohn
- Emanuela Postacchini
- Jackson Rathbone
- Tania Raymonde
- Elisabeth Röhm
- Drew Roy
- Nestor Serrano
- Bill Smitrovich
- Sam Spruell
- Christos Vasilopoulos
- Ilia Volok
- Maiara Walsh
- Peter Weller
- Titus Welliver
- Alfre Woodard
- José Zúñiga

== Development and production ==
In July 2012, TNT ordered a pilot episode for a potential series based on William Brinkley's 1988 novel The Last Ship. Hank Steinberg and Steven Kane wrote the pilot script, and Jonathan Mostow directed the pilot.

The show was filmed at a number of locations across San Diego, including the museum ship USS Iowa (located in San Pedro), used in filming to represent a Russian Kirov-class battlecruiser; and aboard the USS Russell (DDG-59), USS Halsey (DDG-97), and USS Dewey, standing in for the show's fictional USS Nathan James. The series was produced by Channel Road Productions and Platinum Dunes, with Michael Bay, Brad Fuller, Andrew Form, Steinberg, and Kane. All seasons of the show were shot at the Culver Studios, in Culver City.

The former Atlantic liner RMS Queen Mary, now berthed at Long Beach, was also used extensively.

In May 2013, TNT placed a 10-episode order for the series. The series premiered on June 22, 2014, at 9:00 pm EDT. On July 18, 2014, The Last Ship was renewed for a 13-episode second season. The second season started airing on June 21, 2015. On August 11, 2015, The Last Ship was renewed for a 13-episode third season, slated to premiere June 12, 2016. The season-3 premiere was postponed following the 2016 Orlando nightclub shooting because the episode also included a mass shooting in a nightclub. On July 31, 2016, The Last Ship was renewed for a 10-episode fourth season, which premiered on August 20, 2017. On September 8, 2016, TNT renewed the series for a 10-episode fifth and final season, which was filmed immediately after season four and premiered on September 9, 2018. The final episode aired on November 11, 2018.

== Reception ==
On Metacritic, the first season has an average score of 60 out of 100 based on 22 critics, indicating "generally favorable reviews". Rotten Tomatoes gives the show 83% over the five seasons. The website consensus states: "Movie-sized action sequences and a pretty cast provide smooth sailing for The Last Ship, though it's not anything that hasn't been seen before."

In July 2015, Entertainment Weekly's Ray Abdur Rahman said of the second season, "The story is getting more interesting as we get an on-the-ground sense of how the pandemic-ravaged US has fared."
