= The Last Ship (novel) =

1988 novel by William Brinkley

- Cover of first edition (hardcover)
- Author: William Brinkley
- Cover artist: Neil Stuart (1988)
- Language: English
- Genre: Post-apocalyptic
- Publisher: Viking Press (hardcover); Ballantine Books (paperback)
- Publication date: March 1988
- Publication place: United States
- Media type: Print (hardcover and paperback)
- Pages: 624
- ISBN: 0-670-80981-0 (hardcover); ISBN 0-345-35982-8 (paperback); ISBN 978-0-14-218143-0 (eBook)
- OCLC: 16682861
- Dewey Decimal: 813/.54 19
- LC Class: PS3503.R56175 L37 1988

The Last Ship is a 1988 post-apocalyptic fiction novel by American writer William Brinkley. The Last Ship tells the story of a United States Navy guided missile destroyer, the fictional USS Nathan James (DDG-80), on patrol in the Barents Sea during a brief, full-scale nuclear war between the United States and the Soviet Union. It details the ship's ensuing search for a new home for her crew.

An eponymous television series loosely based on the novel aired from 2014 to 2018 on the TNT network.

== Background ==
The story is told in a first-person point of view by the ship's commanding officer, "Thomas", whose full name is never revealed. Thomas is writing this account several months after the war in order to describe the odyssey of his Norwegian-homeported ship, USS Nathan James (DDG-80), in the aftermath of the conflict.

Thomas begins by describing his ship to the reader. He discusses the ethics of commanding a warship, the capabilities of nuclear strike forces, daily life aboard a U.S. Navy ship in the Arctic Circle, and the nature of his ship's mission. Captain Thomas remarks that, despite the reduction in the land-based ICBM arsenal, there is still considerable power in the SLBMs and Tomahawks; his ship alone has more power than several missile silos combined.

== Plot ==
On December 21, at an unspecified year, without prior warning, Thomas, the captain of the U.S. Navy destroyer, USS Nathan James (DDG-80), receives authenticated orders to carry out a nuclear strike on the Soviet city of Orel and its nearby ICBM silos. The nuclear-tipped Tomahawks are fired off in an emotionless, automated manner. Over a period of hours the crew watches them make landfall on radar and listens as the radio stations from Orel go off the air. With the mission completed, they report back to their superiors, and a reply from the U.S. Navy comes through, ordering them to break with general orders, but the message garbles to gibberish towards the end without relaying their new orders. With one exception later in the book, this is the last official communication from the U.S. Navy that Nathan James ever receives. While they can later surmise there must have been a series of major exchanges, the crew never learns with certainty what led to the launches or the exact sequence of events.

Thomas decides to head southward into the North Sea and then to the United Kingdom, in order to re-establish contact with friendly forces. The ship encounters dense clouds of radioactive smoke all around Great Britain. Reaching London via the River Thames, the smoke becomes too dangerous, and they are forced to retreat. As the ship is sealed, Thomas catches a glimpse of the ruins of Big Ben through the smoke, with its clock hands stopped at the presumed time the bombs fell.

Lacking information, the ship sets off to scout the coastline of the Mediterranean Sea, counterclockwise from southern Italy to Gibraltar. Off the coast of Brittany, the ship encounters a non-communicative submarine which tails them until the ship arrives off the destroyed Rock of Gibraltar, where it vanishes. Nathan James continues to scout the Mediterranean coastline, finding only scores of disfigured survivors suffering from radiation sickness who have fled the chaos inland. Off the coast of Southern France, Nathan James finds a luxury sailboat with the passengers apparently killed mid-meal, suggesting the use of a neutron bomb on a nearby coastal city. The corpse of the ship's radioman is found deeper within, along with his limited report of areas hit with nuclear weapons, painting a bleak picture for Europe, the Soviet Union, and North America. Returning to Gibraltar, the Soviet Navy ballistic missile submarine Pushkin surfaces to make direct contact.

The two vessels quickly establish a truce and agree to a joint operation. The Pushkin, fully fuelled but low on food, will first scout West Africa, then attempt to reach a secret Soviet supply base in the Arctic and retrieve supplies and nuclear fuel for Nathan James. The U.S. Navy destroyer, relatively well-stocked with food but low on nuclear fuel, will scout North Africa, then make her way to the Pacific Ocean in search of habitable land for the two crews. Thomas keeps the deal he made with the Soviet captain, from most of his crew, in order to not get their hopes up. Trading food and a place for the Soviets in any society the Nathan James' crew builds on land, he is promised nuclear fuel, if found at the Soviet base. Before Nathan James scouts Mediterranean Africa, many crew members request to be baptized. With Thomas’ blessing, the ship's Jesuit chaplain conducts the sermon on a beach.

Strangely, despite not seeing evidence of direct nuclear strikes, the ship finds no people, only radiation levels which steadily increase the farther inland from any shore the party lands on. During the journey, the crew salvages relatively uncontaminated farming equipment, plants, and even two goats from a small island to potentially start farming any hospitable land.

Eventually Nathan James receives a message from the National Command Authority ordering all recipients to reply. They do so, but the message repeats unaltered with machine-like precision; they conclude it is just an automated transmission. Based on his knowledge of the Soviet Union's targeting of North America, the Soviet submarine captain's report, the French radioman's report, and what he has seen of Europe, Thomas, along with most of the ship's officers, concludes that the United States has simply ceased to exist, and what remains of North America is uninhabitable.

Many of the crew, though, wish to go home to the U.S. to see what happened. This would require them to expend most of their remaining fuel, rendering them unable to reach the Pacific to look for habitable land. If the U.S. were anything like Europe or Africa, the ship would simply be trapped. Thomas thus decides to proceed to the Pacific Ocean by way of the Suez Canal. As the crew gets to relax on a beach for a few hours, they discover that a sailor has wandered off inland, with no time left to follow his tracks.

At Suez, the ship's Combat Systems Officer (CSO) states his belief that parts of North America may still be habitable and demands that the ship return to the U.S. East Coast, so they can see for themselves. The captain tries to discourage the CSO, but the latter challenges the captain's authority, reminding him that the U.S. Navy (under which Thomas is legally bestowed the title of captain) no longer exists, meaning Thomas is no longer in lawful command, and demands a vote on the correct course of action. Thomas, angered at this mutiny, allows a vote thinking the CSO has little support, but is shocked when nearly a third of the crew side with the CSO. The mutineers demand rafts and the captain's gig in order to sail thousands of miles to the United States. With a mixture of sadness and outrage, Thomas agrees, and the mutineers depart.

In the following weeks the ship proceeds through the Suez Canal, which is luckily open, and travels through treacherous seas towards the Indian Ocean. Coming across permissive conditions on the coast of Kenya, Thomas leads an armed expedition inland. The shore party finds the grassland to be lush, but notice that it is dead quiet, and devoid of birds or insects. They eventually find a large group of savanna animals, but they are suffering from radiation-sickness, like the people previously encountered. Upon learning that even the healthy animals can’t be saved, Thomas orders his men to kill all of them, to end their suffering.

From Bombay to Singapore, they notice a pattern where the amount of fallout increases with the size of nearby landmasses, with shores and cities ablaze, surrounded by mantels of radioactive smoke, reaching to the heavens. One coastal town, visited by Thomas in the past, appears intact – but is too contaminated to approach. Approaching the Java Sea, the fallout becomes so dense that the crew cannot go onto the weather decks. Nuclear winter begins to take full effect, with dramatic temperature drops and black snow at the equator. Luckily, Nathan James was designed with cold weather and fallout in mind, and Thomas orders the ship hermetically sealed and people stationed on the bridge in short rotations. Despite this, the crew suffers from mild radiation sickness, and their passage through the dense fallout becomes so trying psychologically that fifteen crew members, including three women, vanish overboard. Reading what seems like a suicide note, the Jesuit concludes that some of the crew suffer from a deep sense of guilt for their role in the global destruction. Things become even bleaker when they lose contact with the Soviet submarine, assuming she, with the nuclear fuel, was lost while scouting the Soviet coastline. Confronted with rising radiation levels, posing a fatal danger to the bridge crew, Thomas decides to turn the ship around, and change course for southern Australia, which will severely affect their fuel supply.

Approaching the Tasman Sea, one of the women is sexually assaulted. Thomas receives an anonymous note with the name, and condemns the rapist to be marooned, despite dissent. The doomed sailor offers no denials or resistance. Left to die with some food and a loaded pistol, he waves to the leaving party, as if to say goodbye.

Nathan James eventually reaches the remote South Pacific and, with the ship's nuclear fuel nearly gone, discovers a small, uncontaminated island in French Polynesia. The ship's crew establishes a community on the island, and they begin to try to conceive children to continue civilization. They work out an arrangement to allow genetic diversity with anonymous fatherhood, with the women always in strict control. An archival project is started, wherein everyone is encouraged to write out their knowledge for future generations. One day, the island look-out spots a war-ship on the horizon, but it disappears and is never seen again. Over time, two women go missing, and one night, a pair decide to desert the community in a boat.

Thomas and the ship's female lieutenant begin a relationship in secret. They meet each other regularly in a watery cave on the far side of the island, confiding many things to each other – including access to the missile firing keys in their separate custody; a precaution known to them and two other officers. One day, returning from the cave, they discover three bodies – and realize that someone on the island is murdering the women.

The two devise a plan to find the killer. It turns out to be the ship's radiation officer, who has been an indispensable asset to their survival, and thereby witnessed every radioactive horror they have encountered. He confesses, before being killed by the lieutenant, that he has been killing the women, including those who vanished at sea, to end humanity for its destruction of the world. Despite protests, Thomas decides to give him a proper burial along with the victims, crediting him with saving all their lives before losing his mind.

With the community returning to normal, the Pushkin appears on the horizon. Its crew is on the verge of starvation, and have lost twelve crew members and its long-range antenna, but are carrying an abundance of nuclear fuel with them. Thomas befriends the submarine's captain, who tells him of their extensive exploration of the lifeless Soviet coast, and then proposes to use the island as a home base, and their ships to re-discover the world. As they return from a walk around the island, the missing pair are retrieved from the water in their boat, dead.

The Russian crew easily find their place in the community. The Pushkin is prepared and stocked to make a first voyage, with thirty-three Americans as new crew members, when the lieutenant informs Thomas that no pregnancies are forth-coming. Fearing that the sailors may have become sterile from radiation, it is decided to introduce the submariners, who may have been free of contamination due to being submerged, to the community's gene pool. The voyage is postponed.

Throughout their journey, Thomas has been pondering on voices of concern about the ship's remaining supply of Tomahawk missiles. One day, before he intends to order them dismantled, Nathan James sets out for a routine maintenance drill. With the ship beyond the horizon, Thomas suddenly discovers that his missile firing key is missing. As he tries to radio the ship, someone suddenly fires the Tomahawks, seemingly to dispose of them. One of the missiles accidentally detonates while in flight, triggering a chain reaction among all of the other missiles, contaminating the area.

Thomas, his remaining crew, and the Soviet crew immediately embark aboard the Pushkin to escape, but are forced to leave a contingent of crew on fishing duty behind. They try to find Nathan James, but discover only small pieces of wreckage, indicating that it was destroyed during the accidental detonation. Soon after leaving the area, the submarine captain has a private talk with Thomas, and the two officers shrewdly agree that they have no further use for the remaining missiles, and the freed space in the silos will serve better as living space. The captain has them jettisoned, hoping that they were the last of their kind.

The Pushkin eventually reaches Antarctica, which is uncontaminated and teeming with local wildlife. They arrive at McMurdo Station, which is abandoned, but contains twelve years' worth of food and supplies. It is decided that the entire crew, now united with American and Russian members, will use McMurdo Station as a home base, and conduct long and thorough explorations of the world during the winter, returning to base during the summer when the ice breaks.

Shortly before setting out to sea, Thomas finds himself troubled. With everyone who could have taken control of the missiles having perished, he has no way to be certain of what went wrong, or even know the sequence of events that led to Nathan James’ final moments. Agonized, he makes his first confession to the Jesuit, who absolves him, and then tells him that the quarters built onboard the submarine will need a nursery, because three women are now expecting children.

== Reception ==
V.C. Royster of The Wall Street Journal compared The Last Ship to Nevil Shute's On the Beach (1957), observing The Last Ship is an "even more fascinating tale". Anthony Hyde of The Washington Post wrote, The Last Ship is "An extraordinary novel of men at war" and a "superb portrait of naval command". John R. Alden of The Cleveland Plain Dealer praised The Last Ship as "beautifully written" and a "magnificent book". Clay Reynolds of The Dallas Morning News called the book "engrossing" and a "pleasure to read". Burke Wilkinson, a U.S. naval officer, writing for The Christian Science Monitor, called The Last Ship "extraordinary" and a "true classic", saying its sum was "greater than its parts".

After the success of Sex, Lies, and Videotape, Steven Soderbergh had planned on adapting the book as his next film; however, he abandoned the project after several unsatisfactory screenplay drafts.

== Television adaptation ==
In July 2012, the U.S. cable television network TNT ordered a pilot episode of a series based on the novel. The series is produced by Platinum Dunes Partners with Michael Bay, Hank Steinberg, and Steven Kane serving as executive producers. Steinberg and Kane wrote the pilot script, and Jonathan Mostow directed the pilot. The adaptation varies significantly from the original novel. In addition to being set in the early part of the first half of the 21st century, the worldwide devastation of mankind is the result of a pandemic for which the crew must find a cure and not the result of nuclear warfare between superpowers.

In May 2013, TNT ordered 10 episodes of The Last Ship, which aired in 2014. A second season (of 13 episodes) was ordered in 2014 and aired in 2015, and a third season (also of 13 episodes) was ordered in 2015 and aired in 2016. A fourth season of 10 episodes aired in August 2017 and a 10-episode fifth and final season aired in September 2018.

== Other adaptations ==
The Last Ship was released as an e-book on November 27, 2013, published by Plume.
