= George Norcross =

American political boss

George E. Norcross
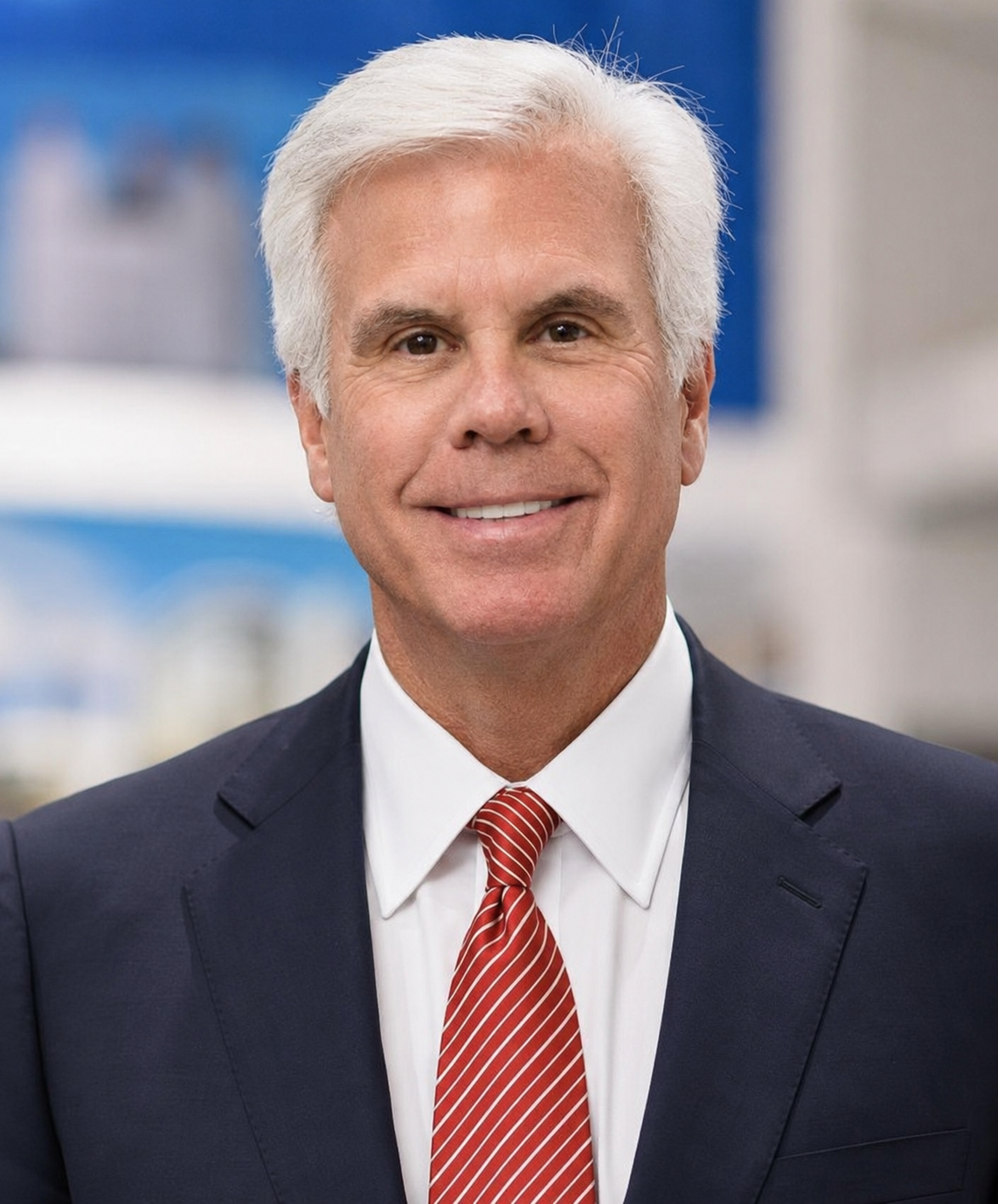
- Born: March 16, 1956 (age 70); Camden, New Jersey, U.S.
- Education: Rutgers University, Camden
- Occupations: Businessman; non-profit leader; political boss
- Political party: Democratic
- Children: 2
- Relatives: Donald Norcross (brother); John C. Norcross (brother); Philip A. Norcross (brother)

George E. Norcross III (born March 16, 1956) is an American businessman, organizer, and political boss. A member of the Democratic Party, Norcross is considered a power broker in southern New Jersey.

Norcross is executive chairman of Conner Strong & Buckelew, an insurance and benefits brokerage. He is chairman of the board of trustees for Cooper Norcross Health, MD Anderson Cancer Center at Cooper Norcross and Cooper Norcross Hospital, all in Camden, New Jersey, and has served as a trustee since 1990. He led the effort to create the Cooper Medical School of Rowan University and to partner with MD Anderson Cancer Center to create the MD Anderson Cancer Center at Cooper Norcross, which opened in 2013.

Norcross has been a prominent political leader in New Jersey for more than 30 years, since before he became chairman of the Camden County Democratic Committee in 1989, a position he held until 1993. For many years, he was named one of the most powerful non-elected political figures in New Jersey by the website PolitickerNJ.com.

Norcross was a member of the Democratic National Committee until 2021 when he changed his voter registration to Florida. He formerly belonged to Mar-a-Lago, the club owned by United States president Donald Trump.

In June 2024, Norcross was indicted on 13 charges of racketeering and criminal enterprise by State Attorney General Matthew Platkin. The indictment was dismissed in 2025, and the state ended the case in 2026.

== Early life ==
Norcross was born on March 16, 1956, in Cooper University Hospital, Camden, New Jersey, the son of George E. Norcross Jr. (1928-1998), the president of the AFL–CIO Central Labor Union of Camden and Gloucester Counties, and his wife, Anne Carol Norcross (1931-2016). His father was active in the community of Camden, served as a board member of Cooper University Hospital, and chaired the board of Camden County's United Way.

Norcross graduated from Pennsauken High School and briefly attended Rutgers University–Camden. He has three brothers: Donald, a United States Congressman representing New Jersey's 1st congressional district; Philip, managing partner of the law firm Parker McCay; and John, a psychologist, author, and professor at the University of Scranton.

== Career ==
=== Insurance ===
Norcross is the executive chairman of insurance, risk management, and employee benefits brokerage and consulting firm Conner Strong & Buckelew, where he has worked since 1979. Norcross was named the second most powerful man in the New Jersey business world by NJBiz.com in 2014, 2015, and 2016, and made the list's top ten list in 2017, 2018, 2019, 2020 and 2021. In September 2015, Norcross was announced as one of the local investors in The Camden Waterfront, a $1 billion development on Camden's waterfront initially developed by Liberty Property Trust and designed by Robert A.M. Stern. Norcross said he would invest $50 million in the project, and in March 2017, Norcross announced his company would move to the Camden waterfront as part of a $245 million development.

=== Cooper University Health Care System ===
Norcross is chairman of the Board of Trustees of Cooper Norcross Health, Cooper University Hospital and the MD Anderson Cancer Center at Cooper Norcross, in Camden, New Jersey. He has served as a Cooper trustee since 1990. Norcross launched the Cooper Medical School of Rowan University and helped to facilitate the opening of the MD Anderson Cooper Cancer Center in October 2013.

In July 2026, Norcross announced a $100 million gift to Cooper University Health Care and MD Anderson Cancer Center at Cooper in honor of his parents. It was the largest gift in the system's history and among the largest ever to a nonprofit health system in New Jersey. The funds are designated for investments in Camden and the system's South Jersey service area, with a focus on education and community programs.

In the wake of the Veterans Health Administration scandal of 2014, Cooper announced a "Veterans VIP Priority Program" that provided day care to veterans in New Jersey's seven southern counties. In November 2014, Cooper and Norcross were awarded the "Seven Seals" award by the Employer Support of the Guard and Reserve in recognition of the program.

In February 2012, Norcross penned an op-ed in the Courier-Post praising the idea of merging Rowan University and Rutgers-Camden. In June that year, the state approved the partnership.

=== Formica Freitag Bakery ===
In January 2022, Norcross and his family became majority partners in the Formica Bakery, a maker of "Atlantic City Original" bread which had fallen into bankruptcy in 2019. It was subsequently renamed Formica Freitag Bakery, and merged with Valenti's Italian Bakery of Pleasantville in January 2023.

=== Politics ===
Norcross was considered the "political boss" of the "Democratic machine" in New Jersey, particularly in South Jersey. He held significant sway over local party organizations, fundraising, and candidates' access to the county line. Norcross was chairman of the Camden County Democratic Party from 1989 to 1995 and was a prolific fundraiser, with influence over many county jobs and contracts. Journalist Steve Kornacki wrote in 2011, "It’s not written down anywhere, but it’s acknowledged by everyone (privately, of course): You don’t run for office as a Democrat in South Jersey unless George is OK with it—and you don’t win in the fall without him." In tapes leaked in 2005, Norcross was recorded saying he could secure allies with jobs and punish political opponents. Norcross allegedly attempted to have a town's solicitor fired because he ran for a local party chairmanship, pressuring the town's mayor with threats to his private job.

By 2003, Norcross held influence over more than a dozen powerful state legislators and controlled government contracts through a pay-to-play system that directed businesses' donations to campaigns; In 2009, Norcross was instrumental in the ousting of Richard Codey as senate president in favor of his childhood friend Stephen Sweeney. Governor Jon Corzine's loss to Chris Christie in the 2009 gubernatorial election was credited in part to Norcross's not having used his machine to mobilize voters for Corzine. Norcross subsequently had a positive relationship with the Republican governor.

In 2021, Sweeney, then president of the New Jersey Senate, and one of Norcross's closest allies, lost re-election. Politico said that the loss indicated a substantial decline in Norcross's power and influence. In 2023, he announced that he was decreasing his involvement in politics, saying it was "time for others to lead" and conceding that Sweeney's loss had left him "sitting in the backseat".

== Criticism ==
The office of the Attorney General of New Jersey and the United States Attorney's office under Chris Christie investigated Norcross after he was secretly taped discussing state politics. After investigation and significant media coverage, he was not charged. Norcross was also the subject of a federal investigation in 2016 where his phones were wiretapped. The United States Attorney's Office for New Jersey sent Norcross a letter confirming that no action was warranted and the investigation was closed.

Norcross has been associated with businesses that are alleged to have received special treatment from the New Jersey Economic Development Authority.

An investigative task force was formed to look into the operations and procedures of the NJEDA. Norcross sued the State of New Jersey to stop the highly critical report from becoming public. After a five-hour court hearing about the injunction, Norcross lost and within minutes, the report was made public.

== Racketeering charges ==
On June 17, 2024, New Jersey Attorney General Matthew Platkin unsealed a thirteen-count racketeering indictment against Norcross and five other individuals, including his brother, Philip. The indictment accused Norcross and the other defendants of conspiring to illegally obtain waterfront property and property rights, unlawfully collecting millions of dollars in government tax credits, and attempting to influence and control public officials.

On July 9, 2024, Norcross and his four co-defendants were in Mercer County Courthouse in Trenton, New Jersey. They all pleaded not guilty. Norcross's lawyer, Michael Critchley, "emphatically" said he was not guilty to Superior Court Judge Peter E. Warshaw Jr.

On February 26, 2025, a Superior Court judge dismissed the indictment against Norcross and his allies. Almost immediately after, Platkin announced his intention to appeal the decision. On January 30, 2026, the appeal was denied, keeping the original ruling in place.

== Personal life ==
Norcross has two children. He was previously listed as a resident of Cherry Hill, New Jersey, but in 2023, Norcross was reported to be an official resident of Florida, living there "about 90 percent of [the] time".

Norcross was listed as one of the state's wealthiest people, ranked 41st in New Jersey in 2015 with a net worth of almost $250 million.
