= Rutgers University–Camden =

Public university in Camden, New Jersey, US

Coordinates: 39.949°N 75.124°W

- Former names: South Jersey Law School (1926–1927); College of South Jersey (1927–1950); Rutgers College of South Jersey (1950–1970)
- Motto: Sol iustitiae et occidentem illustra
- Motto in English: Sun of righteousness, shine upon the West also.
- Type: Public research university
- Established: March 21, 1926; 100 years ago
- Academic affiliations: Space-grant
- Endowment: $603 million (2010, systemwide)
- Chancellor: Dennis J. Shields (interim)
- President: William F. Tate IV
- Academic staff: 254
- Administrative staff: 430
- Students: 6,158
- Undergraduates: 4,497
- Postgraduates: 1,661
- Location: Camden, New Jersey, U.S.
- Campus: Urban/suburban
- Alma Mater: On the Banks of the Old Delaware
- Colors: Scarlet
- Sporting affiliations: NCAA Division III; New Jersey Athletic Conference
- Mascot: Scarlet Raptors
- Website: camden.rutgers.edu
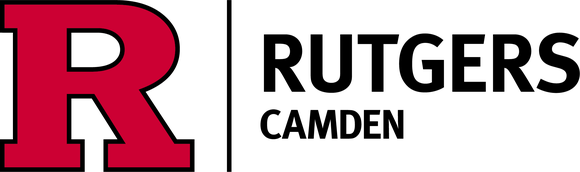

Rutgers University–Camden is a regional campus of Rutgers University—a public land-grant research university—located in Camden, New Jersey. Founded in 1926 as the South Jersey Law School, Rutgers–Camden began as an amalgam of the South Jersey Law School and the College of South Jersey. It is the southernmost of the three regional campuses of Rutgers; the two others are located in New Brunswick and Newark. It is classified among "R2: Doctoral Universities – High research activity".

In 2024, the university was ranked 48th among the top public universities and 98th among national universities by US News and World Report.

== History ==
=== 20th century ===
Rutgers University-Camden was founded in 1926 as The College of South Jersey and South Jersey Law School by a group of South Jersey lawyers led by Collingswood mayor Arthur Armitage. In the 1930s, the campus expanded to programs beyond law, becoming the College of South Jersey and South Jersey Law School. The campus joined the Rutgers University system in 1950, becoming Rutgers University-Camden and Rutgers Law School-Camden.

Since the merger the campus has expanded its footprint in the Cooper Grant and Downtown/University District neighborhoods in Camden, beginning with the completion of the Library of Arts and Sciences (now the Paul Robeson Library) in 1958. The campus tore down several blocks of the Cooper Grant and Linden Street neighborhoods to construct Armitage Hall, the Campus Center, the Fine Arts Building and Gordon Theater, and the Science Building in the 1960s and early 1970s.

In the 1980s, residential dorms were constructed on the corner of Cooper and 2nds Street, and the Business School building was dedicated in 1989.

==== Campus Activism ====
The Black Student Unity Movement of Rutgers-Camden was founded in 1969 by a group of Black students at the school. While racial segregation in public education was deemed unconstitutional by the decision in Brown v. Board of Education, universities still had policies in place that caused de facto segregation. On February 10, 1969, three students from the Black Student Unity Movement interrupted a political science class that was taking place on Rutgers-Camden's campus and dispersed papers that listed the movement's demands. Some demands listed by the Black Student Unity Movement were "that all racist faculty be removed from the university, an Urban Education Department be established, and that the new library addition be named after Paul Robeson". The movement was unable to get their demands met by Rutgers University immediately, but in 1991, the campus library was renamed Paul Robeson Library

=== 21st century ===
In the 2010s, the campus expanded to the downtown area of Camden with the construction of the new Nursing Science building.

In 2010, the campus offered its first doctoral program in Childhood studies, the first program of its kind in the United States.

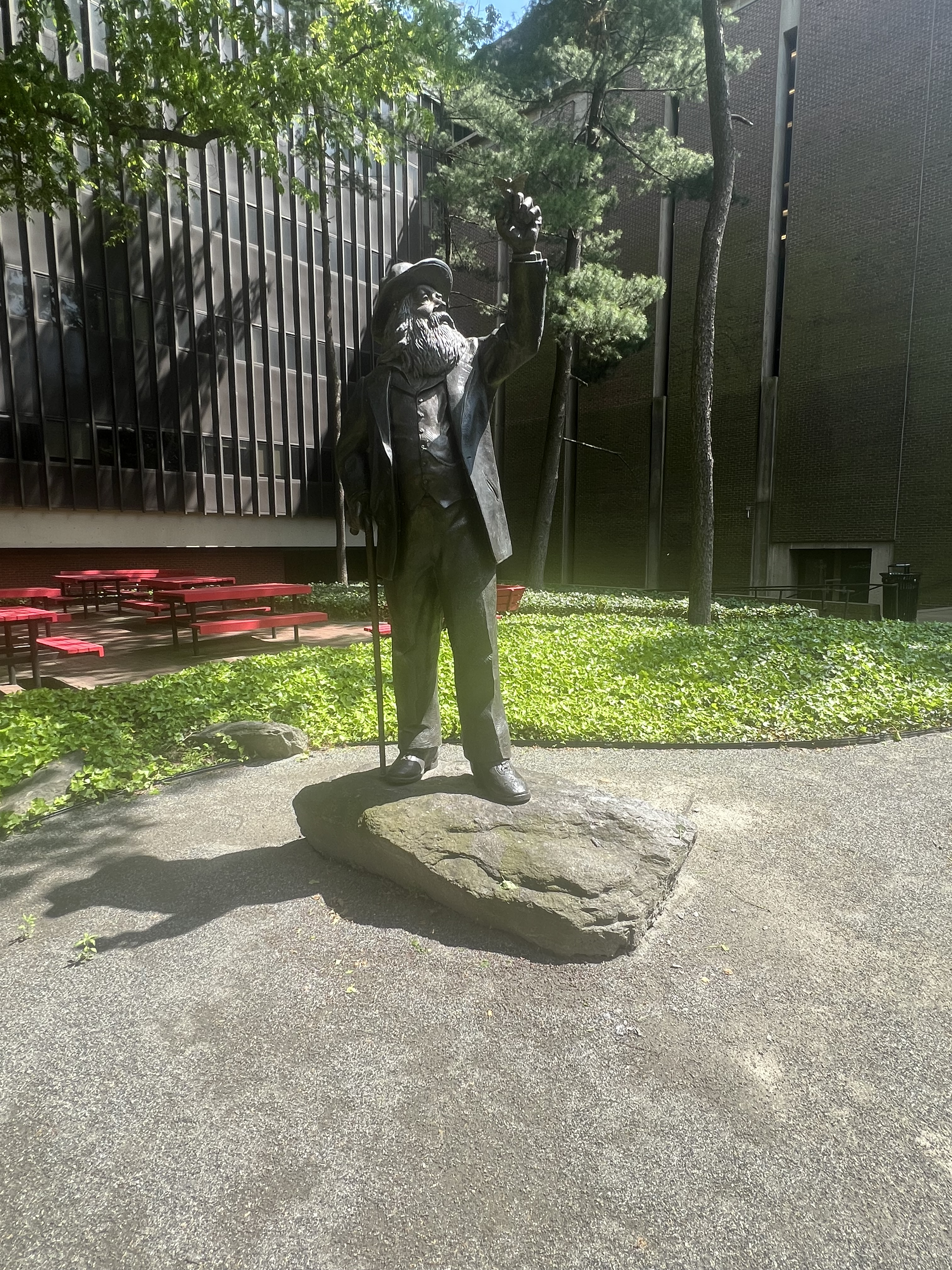
Walt Whitman Statue at its new location on Rutgers University-Camden campus

In 2012, there was a proposal for the campus to merge with Rowan University. Due to a large opposition movement led by faculty, staff, students and alumni, the proposal was defeated.

In 2020 the Cooper Branch Library building was converted into the Digital Studies Center, housing the undergraduate and graduate digital studies programs, as well as an archive of digital technologies including video games. The Center also houses the campus writing lab.

On June 20, 2020, students of Rutgers University–Camden created a petition that called for "the removal of the Walt Whitman statue which stands tall in the middle of our campus." Walt Whitman was an American poet and writer, who purchased a house in Camden, New Jersey, in 1864, where he wrote Leaves of Grass, his most notable collection of poems.

In some of his works, Whitman referred to Black individuals as "baboons" and "wild brutes" and had utilized a racial slur against Black people. Many Black intellectuals have called for these comments to be discussed at the same time as praise of Walt Whitman. Rutgers University-Camden addressed the concerns proposed in the petition by hosting virtual meetings with community members, university faculty, students, and historians. In 2021, the statute of Walt Whitman was moved from in front of the Rutgers University–Camden campus center to a garden space on campus and included contextualization of the complex history.

== Academics ==
Rutgers–Camden is accredited by the Middle States Commission on Higher Education. It has nearly 40 majors and 50 minors plus special programs, an Honors College, hands-on research with faculty mentors, study abroad, internships, civic learning, and various graduate and advanced professional programs. The academic year follows a 4-4 schedule of two four-course semesters, fall and spring. During the winter study term, students study various courses outside of typical curriculum for 3 weeks in January. Rutgers students often take the winter study term to pursue internships or work on intensive research projects.

=== Graduate and professional programs ===
The Graduate School offers 14 programs granting master's degrees in several liberal arts disciplines including history, English literature, languages, and creative writing, as well as advanced degrees in the biological, chemical, computer, and mathematical sciences, nursing, psychology, social work, political science and public policy, and Doctoral programs in Childhood Studies, Computational Biology, and Public Affairs with emphasis on community development. An MBA program is offered through the Rutgers School of Business-Camden.

=== Visual and Performing Arts ===
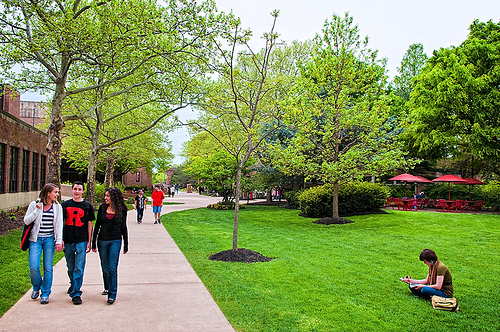
RU-Camden-campus walk

The Rutgers–Camden Center for the Arts provides performances, exhibitions, education programs, and community projects. The Fine Arts Building on the Rutgers–Camden campus houses the Walter K. Gordon Theater, Black Box Theater, and the Stedman Gallery. The Gordon Theater is the home venue for the Collingswood-based Symphony in C.

=== Rutgers School of Business–Camden ===
The Rutgers School of Business teaches accounting, management, organizational behavior, marketing, and related arts. The Rutgers School of Business is accredited by the Association to Advance Collegiate Schools of Business (AACSB).

=== Rutgers Law School ===
The Rutgers Law School is a center of legal education, with two campuses—in Camden and Newark. Its faculty is internationally recognized in a number of fields including constitutional, criminal, health, and corporate law. Its alumni are leading members of the bar in public and private practice settings throughout the nation. The school is well represented among the state and federal judiciary. The law school is a member of the Association of American Law Schools and is on the list of approved schools of the American Bar Association. It offers a three-year course of study for full-time students and a four-year, part-time program leading to the awarding of the Juris Doctor degree."

=== Rutgers School of Nursing–Camden ===
The Rutgers School of Nursing–Camden offers curricula that integrate nursing knowledge and clinical practice, including baccalaureate programs for traditional students, registered nurse students, and second-degree students; a doctor of nursing practice program; and certification in school nursing and wound ostomy continence nursing.

=== Libraries ===
The Paul Robeson Library develops and maintains access to materials that support undergraduate and graduate coursework and research. A designated Federal Depository for the First U.S. Congressional District, the library serves as a public resource for the citizens of New Jersey. Library faculty deliver comprehensive support for reference and research questions in their subject areas. Through the Paul Robeson Library, the Rutgers–Camden community may access the global resources of the Rutgers University Library System. The Robeson library also serves as the academic library for students and faculty at the Camden campuses of Camden County College and Rowan University. The current library was originally built in 1958, with expansions completed in 1969 and 2008.

The Paul Robeson Library

The Law Library is one of New Jersey's largest law libraries. It serves as a research facility for law students, legal practitioners, and the general public. The Law Library houses a collection of over 440,000 books and other materials, and the collection is comprehensive in its holdings of American, English, Canadian, and foreign legal periodicals. The Law Library is located on three floors of the Law School Building. A selective federal depository, the Rutgers–Camden Law Library hosts numerous online collections of public documents related to federal and New Jersey courts.

== Campus ==
=== Dorms and student housing ===
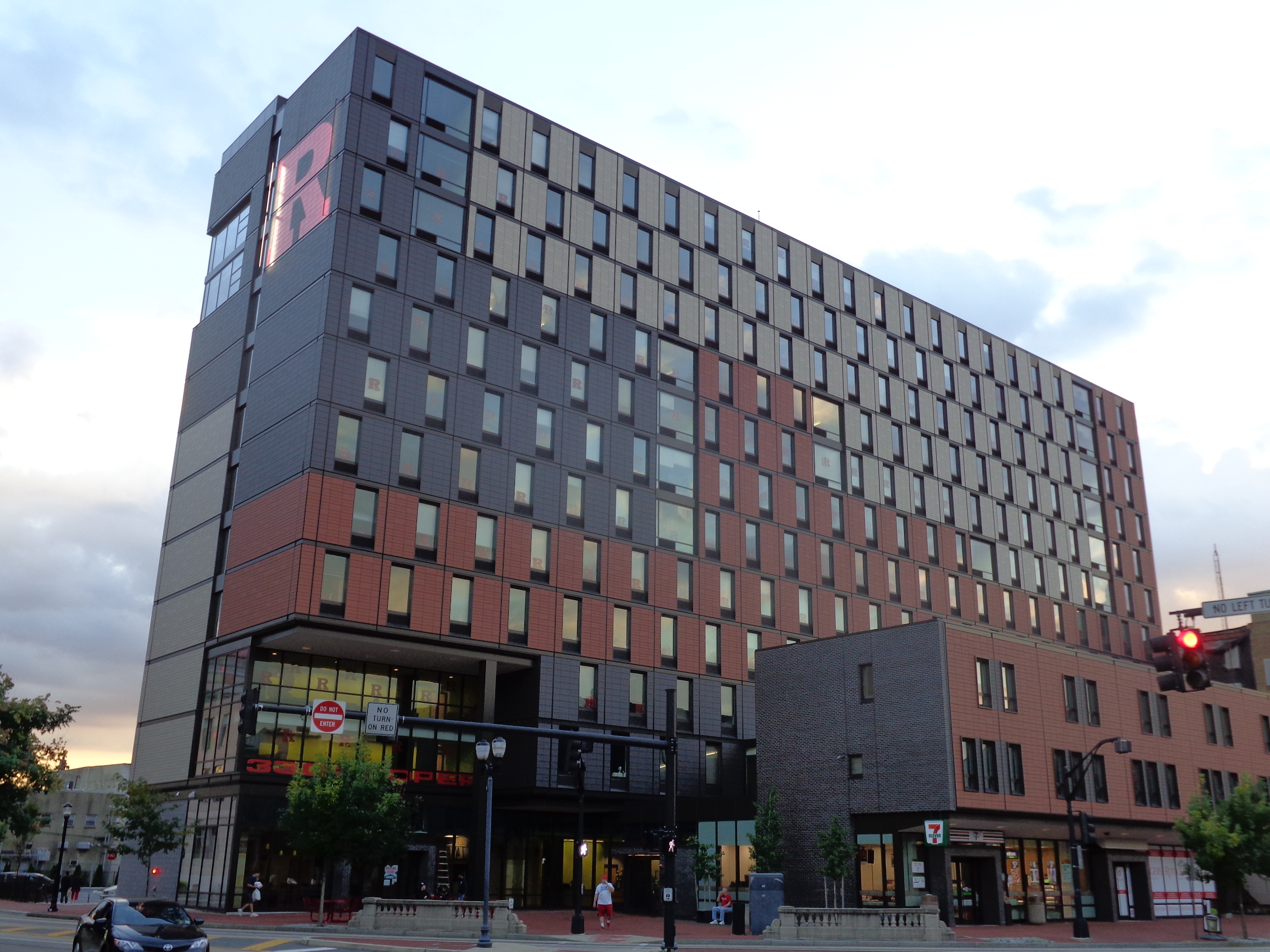
330 Cooper

Undergraduate and graduate dorms are located at Third and Cooper Streets, and a graduate residence hall is located at 330 Cooper Street. The twelve-story residence hall is the tallest building on campus. Many students live off campus in Camden's Cooper Grant neighborhood, in Philadelphia, or in surrounding suburbs such as Collingswood and Haddonfield.

=== Alumni House ===
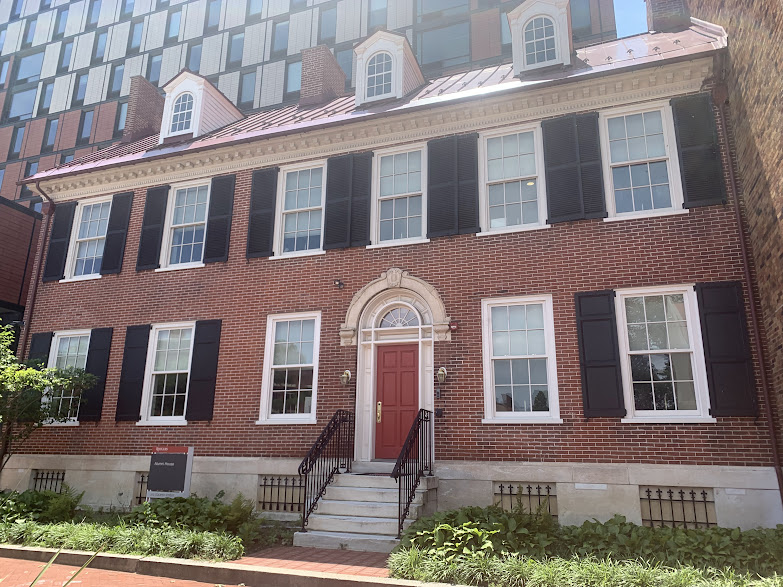
Rutgers Alumni House at 312 Cooper Street

The Rutgers Alumni House is located at 312 Cooper Street, in a historic mansion built in 1809, and serves the alumni of all four Rutgers University campuses.

=== Writers House ===
The Rutgers Writers House is located at 305 Cooper Street, in a house historically known as the Dr. Henry Genet Taylor House. The house is home to the university's MFA in Creative Writing Program, as well as the journals Cooper Street and StoryQuarterly. The Writers House hosts writers, scholars, and others for various programs.

=== Rutgers-Camden Center for the Arts ===
North of the campus green, The Rutgers-Camden Center for the Arts houses the Stedman Art Gallery, the Gordon Theater, and the Black Box theater.

=== Mid-Atlantic Regional Center for the Humanities ===
Rutgers-Camden is home to the Mid-Atlantic Regional Center for the Humanities (MARCH), a public humanities learning and professional center which publishes the Encyclopedia of Greater Philadelphia, hosts fellowships, and sponsors research projects on the Mid-Atlantic region.

=== Transportation services ===
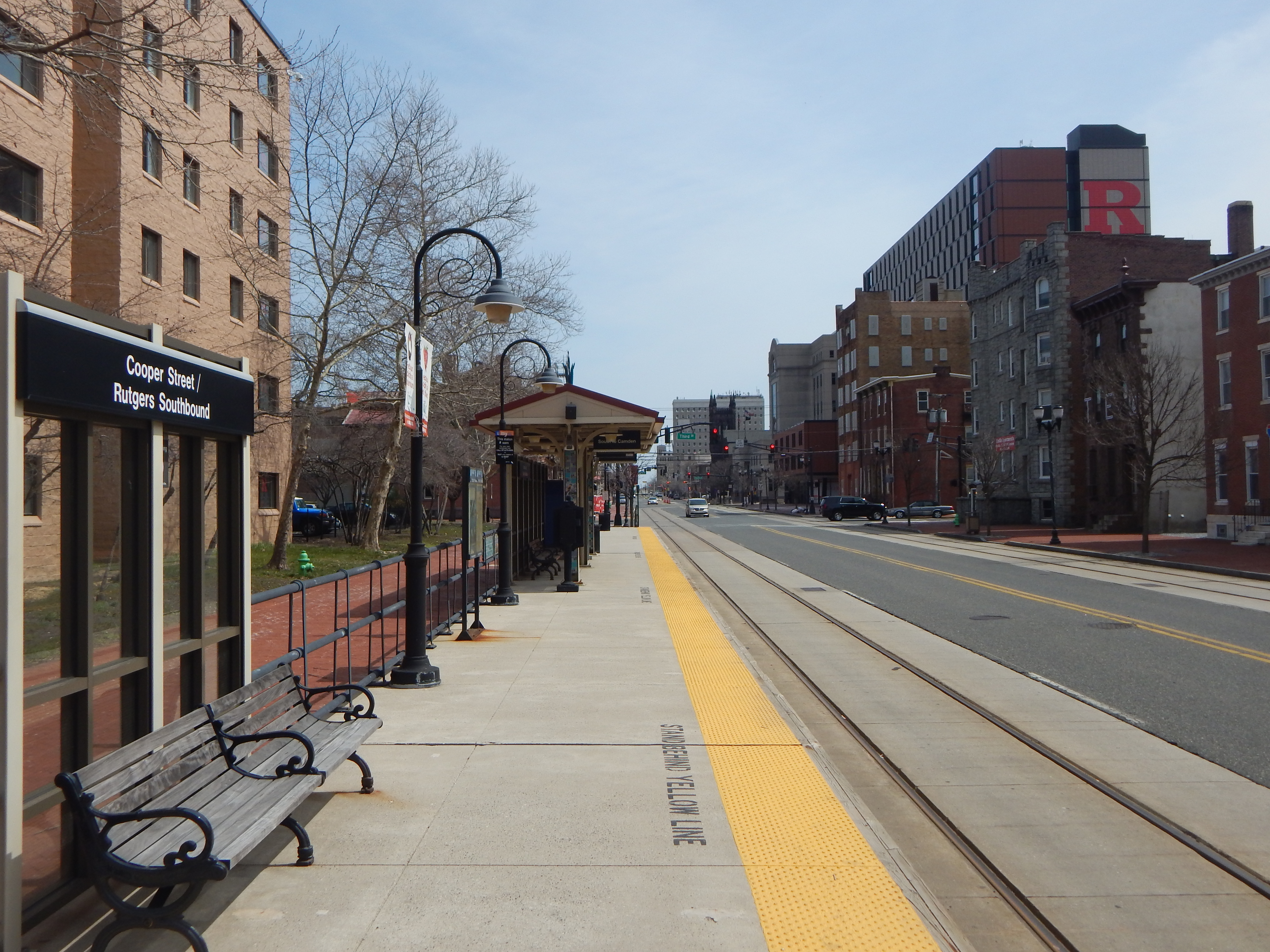
Cooper Street–Rutgers University station

Regional rail access to the university is provided by the PATCO Speedline—the City Hall station is located two blocks from center campus—and the Cooper Street–Rutgers University station of the River Line. The Walter Rand Transportation Center, a few blocks from campus, which provides access to several NJ Transit bus lines. Additionally, the seasonally operated RiverLink Ferry running between Camden and Philadelphia has a stop at the nearby Adventure Aquarium.

As a service to students of the university, the Rutgers–Camden Police Department provides "a walking security escort for individuals to their vehicles, campus housing, the PATCO Hi-Speed Line station at 5th and Market Sts., and the Walter Rand Transportation Center on Broadway". The campus also runs shuttle buses with stops throughout the campus.

== Athletics ==
Rutgers-Camden athletics logo

The Rutgers–Camden's athletic teams have been called the Scarlet Raptors since 1998, pror to that year the teams were known as the Pioneers. The university is a member in the Division III level of the National Collegiate Athletic Association (NCAA), primarily competing in the New Jersey Athletic Conference (NJAC) for most of its sports since the 1985–86 academic year; except men's golf and women's volleyball, which the NJAC does not sponsor either. In those two sports, the Scarlet Raptors are members of the United East Conference (UEC) for men's golf and the Eastern College Athletic Conference (ECAC) for women's volleyball.

Rutgers–Camden competes in 17 intercollegiate varsity sports (8 for men and 9 for women). Men's sports include baseball, basketball, cross country, golf, soccer, tennis and track & field (indoor and outdoor); women's sports include basketball, cross country, golf, lacrosse, soccer, baseball, tennis, track & field (indoor and outdoor) and volleyball.

In 2006, Rutgers–Camden earned its first NCAA Division III national championship when the softball team defeated top-ranked and two-time defending champion St. Thomas (Minn.), 3–2. Rutgers–Camden set program marks with a 47–5 record and a 29-game winning streak.

In 2012 and 2013, Rutgers–Camden student-athlete Tim VanLiew won back-to-back NCAA Men's Division III Outdoor Track and Field Championships in the javelin. He won his first title on May 26, 2012, with a throw of 67.19 meters (220.4 ft) at Claremont–Mudd–Scripps in Claremont, California. Nearly a year to the day of his first title, he not only defended his national javelin title, but he did so in record-breaking fashion. VanLiew's throw of 75.55 meters (247.9 ft) set the all-time NCAA Division III record for the new javelin, while shattering the NCAA Championship record, the University of Wisconsin–La Crosse stadium mark, and VanLiew's old Rutgers–Camden program record in the process.

Rutgers–Camden's men's soccer team went a school-record 37 consecutive games without a loss, a record that spanned the 2012 and 2013 seasons. The team compiled a 32–0–5 record during that time, the eighth-longest streak in NCAA Division III men's soccer history. The team earned a trip to the NCAA Division III National Championship for the first time in program history by defeating Loras College, 3–2, in overtime on Dec. 6, 2013, in San Antonio, Texas. The unbeaten streak came to an end on Dec. 7, 2013, in a 2–1 double-overtime loss to Messiah College in the NCAA Division III National Championship. The men's soccer team won three consecutive NJAC titles and in 2013 finished ranked No. 3 in the D3soccer.com Top 25 and No. 4 in the NSCAA national poll.

== Student life ==
=== Student body ===
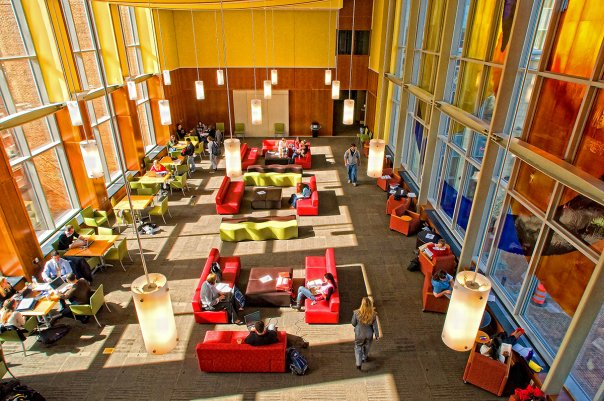
The Law Bridge at Rutgers Law School's student center

Approximately 6,600 undergraduate and graduate students attend Rutgers–Camden. Nearly 600 students live on campus. Renowned for its commitment for diversity, the student body is made up of students from 29 states and 33 countries. There are many clubs that represent various ethnic and racial groups, various religious denominations, political beliefs, and an LGBTQ club. There have been over 43,000 graduates as of 2016

=== Student media ===
- The Gleaner independent newspaper; includes Features, Arts & Entertainment, Commentary, Weekly Word, Comics/Horoscope, Sports. From 1951 to 2020 it was a weekly newspaper, it was revived in 2024 as a monthly print glossy and web-based campus newspaper.
- WCCR-Camden Internet-based radio station

=== Scholarly journals and publications ===
- Cooper Street
- Mickle Street Review
- Journal of the History of Childhood and Youth
- Rutgers Journal of Law and Public Policy (J.L.P.P.)
- Rutgers Journal of Law and Religion
- Rutgers Law Journal
- StoryQuarterly
- The Encyclopedia of Greater Philadelphia
- Mid-Atlantic Regional Center for the Humanities

== Notable alumni ==
- Wayne R. Bryant, J.D. 1972, New Jersey Senator (1995–2008)
- William T. Cahill, J.D. 1937, 46th Governor of New Jersey (1970–1974)
- Bonnie Watson Coleman, attended, Member of the U.S. House of Representatives representing New Jersey's 12th District.
- James Florio, J.D. 1967, 49th Governor of New Jersey (1990–1994)
- Frank J. Giordano, Class of 1972, President and CEO of the Philly Pops Orchestra, former president of the Union League of Philadelphia
- Charles Hallahan, Class of 1969, actor (The Thing, Hunter)
- Michael B. Lavery, J.D. 1989, current Chairman of the New Jersey Republican State Committee and former mayor of Hackettstown.
- Kenneth LeFevre, Class of 1976, member of the New Jersey General Assembly 1996–2002
- Paul Lisicky, Class of 1983, MFA 1986, author, creative writing professor, 2016 Guggenheim Fellow
- Walt MacDonald, Class of 1974, CEO of Educational Testing Services
- Gene Muller, Class of 1977, founder and CEO of Flying Fish Brewing
- Joseph A. Mussomeli, J.D. 1978, former ambassador to Slovenia and Cambodia
- Daniel Nester, Class of 1991, poet and essayist
- Donald Norcross, attended, Member of the U.S. House of Representatives representing New Jersey's 1st District.
- George Norcross, attended, Insurance executive and chairman of Cooper Health System
- John C. Norcross, Class of 1980, author, psychiatrist, university professor
- David Oh, J.D. 1985, Philadelphia City Councilperson and 2023 Republican mayoral candidate.
- Wendy Osefo, Ph.D. 2016, political commentator and assistant professor at Johns Hopkins University
- Gregory Pardlo, Class of 1999, poet, recipient of the 2015 Pulitzer Prize for Poetry
- Robert Pulcini, Class of 1989, Academy Award nominated documentary and feature filmmaker, co-director of American Splendor
- Dana Redd, Class of 1989, former mayor of Camden, New Jersey.
- Eduardo Robreno, J.D. 1978, federal judge for the United States District Court for the Eastern District of Pennsylvania
- Maria Rodriguez-Gregg, Class of 2013, member of the New Jersey General Assembly
- Steven R Schimmel, Class of 2013 MBA, Jewish community leader
- Gregory M. Sleet, J.D. 1976, federal judge for the United States District Court for the District of Delaware

== See also ==
- Henry Rutgers
- List of American state universities
- List of Rutgers University people
- Presidents of Rutgers University
- Post-secondary education in New Jersey
