= Elizabeth Plimack =

American medical oncologist

Academic background
- Education: BSc, 1994, Yale University; MD, Honors in Pathology, 2002, New York University Grossman School of Medicine; MS, Patient-Based Biologic Research, 2008, The University of Texas MD Anderson Cancer Center UTHealth Graduate School of Biomedical Sciences

Elizabeth R. Plimack is an American medical oncologist. She is a professor in the Department of Hematology/Oncology and Chief of the Division of Genitourinary Medical Oncology at the Fox Chase Cancer Center. In these roles, she researches the treatment of genitourinary malignancies with a focus on bladder and kidney cancers.

== Early life and education ==
Plimack received her undergraduate degree from Yale University before completing her medical degree and residency in internal medicine at the New York University Grossman School of Medicine. She then completed her fellowship in medical oncology at the MD Anderson Cancer Center while also earning her Master's degree in patient-based biologic research from The University of Texas MD Anderson Cancer Center UTHealth Graduate School of Biomedical Sciences. As a fellow at MD Anderson, her research involved combining epigenetic therapy and immunotherapy under the guidance of Jean-Pierre Issa.

== Career ==
Following her fellowship and master's degree, Plimack joined the faculty at Fox Chase Cancer Center. As an attending physician at Fox Chase, Plimack researched the treatment of genitourinary malignancies with a focus on bladder and kidney cancers. In 2009, her research team studied the effects blocking of TORC2 signaling activity had on patient activity. She then examined the response and survival rates of patients with papillary renal cell carcinoma who were treated with sunitinib. The result of her study found that sunitinib was not effective in patients with non-clear cell forms of kidney cancer.

In 2015, Plimack and her colleagues discovered that certain genetic mutations in bladder-cancer tumors predict whether chemotherapy will successfully put the cancer in remission. Her research team focused on using Pembrolizumab as an alternate treatment for bladder cancer instead of chemotherapy. As a result of her research, Plimack received the 2015 National Cancer Institute Cancer Clinical Investigator Team Leadership Award and was recognized by Philadelphia Magazine as one of the top doctors of 2017.

As a result of her research, Plimack was elected to serve on the board of American Society of Clinical Oncology for a four-year term starting in 2019. She was also recognized by Philadelphia Magazine as one of the top doctors of the year. In June 2021, Plimack was appointed chair of the scientific advisory board for the Bladder Cancer Advocacy Network and named medical oncology editor for the journal European Urology.

== Personal life ==
Plimack and her husband have two children together.
