= Jean-Pierre Issa =

American physician-scientist and oncologist

- Education: American University of Beirut (BS, MD)
- Known for: Age-related DNA methylation drift; CpG island methylator phenotype (CIMP); Low-dose decitabine and other epigenetic cancer therapies
- Awards: Richard and Hinda Rosenthal Memorial Award (AACR, 2011); Member, American Society for Clinical Investigation (2003); Member, Association of American Physicians (2015)
- Scientific career
- Fields: Epigenetics, cancer biology, medical oncology, biology of aging
- Workplaces: Johns Hopkins University; University of Texas MD Anderson Cancer Center; Temple University (Fels Institute); Fox Chase Cancer Center; Coriell Institute for Medical Research

Jean-Pierre Issa is an American physician-scientist and medical oncologist known for research on DNA methylation in aging and cancer and for early clinical studies of low-dose decitabine. He has been president and chief executive officer of the Coriell Institute for Medical Research in Camden, New Jersey, since 2019.

== Early life and education ==
Issa received a Bachelor of Science and a Doctor of Medicine from the American University of Beirut. He completed a residency in internal medicine at Good Samaritan Hospital in Baltimore and a fellowship in medical oncology at Johns Hopkins University, where he began research on epigenetics and cancer.

== Career ==
Issa joined the faculty of the Johns Hopkins University School of Medicine. He later moved to the University of Texas MD Anderson Cancer Center, where he was professor in the Department of Leukemia and chief of the Section of Translational Research, and co-director of the Center for Cancer Epigenetics. In 2011 he became director of the Fels Institute for Cancer Research and Molecular Biology at Temple University's Lewis Katz School of Medicine, where he was also professor of medicine. He was co-leader of the cancer epigenetics program at Fox Chase Cancer Center from 2012 to 2019, and its deputy director from 2017 to 2019.

Coriell announced his appointment as president and CEO in January 2019, effective February 28, 2019, succeeding Michael F. Christman. He moved his laboratory to the institute in March 2019. In 2023 he became founding director of the Camden Cancer Research Center, a collaboration of Coriell, Cooper University Health Care and Cooper Medical School of Rowan University.

== Research ==
=== CpG island methylator phenotype ===
In 1999 Issa's group developed methylated CpG island amplification, a method for identifying differentially methylated sequences in tumors, and used it, with first author Minoru Toyota, to describe a subset of colorectal cancers with concurrent methylation of many CpG islands, which they termed the CpG island methylator phenotype (CIMP). The concept was initially disputed, but a 2006 study by an independent group tied CIMP to BRAF mutation, and the concept has since been widely used in colorectal cancer research. His group later described three colon cancer subclasses defined by combined genetic and epigenetic features.

=== Age-related DNA methylation ===
In 1994 Issa and colleagues reported that methylation of the estrogen receptor gene's CpG island increases with age in normal human colon and is extensive in colorectal tumors, proposing that age-related methylation may predispose to cancer. His group later reported that age-related methylation changes in mice are widespread and tissue-specific, and a 2017 study found that rates of age-related methylation drift correlated with lifespan in mice, rhesus monkeys and humans, and that caloric restriction slowed drift in mice and monkeys. In 2023 his laboratory proposed DNA methylation entropy as a measure of stem-cell replication and aging.

=== Epigenetic therapy ===
Issa led early clinical studies of low-dose schedules of decitabine, a DNA methylation inhibitor. A 2004 phase 1 trial in hematologic malignancies found prolonged low-dose schedules more active than higher doses, and he co-authored the phase III trial in myelodysplastic syndromes that preceded the drug's approval by the U.S. Food and Drug Administration in 2006. A 2015 multicentre phase 1 study led by Issa evaluated guadecitabine, a degradation-resistant derivative of decitabine, in myelodysplastic syndrome and acute myeloid leukemia.

=== Chromatin and gene silencing ===
In 2008 Issa and colleagues reported that tumor-suppressor genes can be silenced in cancer by Polycomb-associated histone H3 lysine 27 trimethylation independently of promoter DNA methylation. Later work from his laboratory indicated that DNA methylation acts mainly as a molecular memory of gene silencing rather than as a lock on gene expression.

=== Epigenetic drug discovery ===
In 2018 his group reported in Cell that inhibiting the kinase CDK9 reactivated silenced tumor-suppressor genes and sensitized tumors to anti-PD-1 therapy in mice, and introduced the inhibitor MC180295. Further preclinical data on MC180295 were published in 2024.

== Public engagement ==
Issa's work on epigenetic therapy was featured in the PBS NOVA documentary "Ghost in Your Genes" (2007), a co-production with the BBC, in which he discussed epigenetics, aging and low-dose decitabine treatment of leukemia patients at MD Anderson.

== Awards and honors ==
- 2003 – Member, American Society for Clinical Investigation
- 2007 – American Cancer Society Clinical Research Professor
- 2011 – Richard and Hinda Rosenthal Memorial Award, American Association for Cancer Research
- 2015 – Member, Association of American Physicians

== Selected publications ==
- Issa JP, Ottaviano YL, Celano P, Hamilton SR, Davidson NE, Baylin SB (1994). "Methylation of the oestrogen receptor CpG island links ageing and neoplasia in human colon". Nature Genetics. 7 (4): 536–540. doi:10.1038/ng0894-536. PMID 7951326.
- Toyota M, Ahuja N, Ohe-Toyota M, Herman JG, Baylin SB, Issa JP (1999). "CpG island methylator phenotype in colorectal cancer". Proceedings of the National Academy of Sciences of the United States of America. 96 (15): 8681–8686. Bibcode:1999PNAS...96.8681T. doi:10.1073/pnas.96.15.8681. PMC 17576. PMID 10411935.
- Issa JP, Garcia-Manero G, Giles FJ, Mannari R, Thomas D, Faderl S, et al. (2004). "Phase 1 study of low-dose prolonged exposure schedules of the hypomethylating agent 5-aza-2′-deoxycytidine (decitabine) in hematopoietic malignancies". Blood. 103 (5): 1635–1640. doi:10.1182/blood-2003-03-0687. PMID 14604977.
- Maegawa S, Lu Y, Tahara T, Lee JT, Madzo J, Liang S, et al. (2017). "Caloric restriction delays age-related methylation drift". Nature Communications. 8 (1). 539. Bibcode:2017NatCo...8..539M. doi:10.1038/s41467-017-00607-3. PMC 5599616. PMID 28912502.
- Zhang H, Pandey S, Travers M, Sun H, Morton G, Madzo J, et al. (2018). "Targeting CDK9 reactivates epigenetically silenced genes in cancer". Cell. 175 (5): 1244–1258.e26. doi:10.1016/j.cell.2018.09.051. PMC 6247954. PMID 30454645.
