= Lewis L. Coriell =

American virologist (1911–2001)

- Born: 1911; Sciotoville, Ohio, U.S.
- Died: 2001 (aged 89–90); Camden, New Jersey, U.S.
- Education: Stanford High School, Stanford, MT B.S., University of Montana PhD., M.D., University of Kansas
- Known for: Human Tissue Culturing Polio Virus Research and Vaccine Trials Air Filtration Technology Biobanking
- Spouse: Ester Lentz
- Scientific career
- Workplaces: Children's Hospital of Philadelphia Camden Municipal Hospital for Contagious Diseases; Coriell Institute for Medical Research (formerly the South Jersey Medical Research Foundation) College of Physicians of Philadelphia

Lewis L. Coriell (19 June 1911 – 19 June 2001) was a virologist who discovered how to sustain living human cells in culture free of contamination, developed aseptic air filtration techniques, launched one of the first two biobanks recognized by the National Institutes of Health and founded the Coriell Institute for Medical Research.

== Career and research ==
=== Education ===
Coriell began his studies at the University of Montana in the fall semester of 1930. He participated in intercollegiate athletics, joined a fraternity, and worked as the medical proctor of South Hall, the men's dormitory.

In 1935, Coriell was admitted to both the graduate and medical school at the University of Kansas. He completed his master's degree in the spring of 1936, with his thesis focusing on antibody formation. Later that year Coriell began his medical schooling. Beginning in 1941, he got his first taste of pediatric medicine, serving for sixteen months at the Children's Mercy Hospital in Kansas City. He graduated first in his medical school class in 1942.

=== Henry Ford Hospital ===
In the summer of 1942, Coriell was awarded an internship at the Henry Ford Hospital in Detroit. He began his residency in cardiology, but would specialize in pediatrics, and won certification from the American Board of Pediatrics in 1943. His time at Henry Ford Hospital was cut short by the notice of military conscription.

=== Wartime Service and Fort Detrick ===
Coriell began Medical Officer Training School at Carlisle Barracks in Carlisle, Pennsylvania and was then stationed at the US Army Medical Command's Biological Research Division at Fort Detrick in Frederick, Maryland.

Coriell's later work would draw on scientific accomplishments from his time at Fort Detrick. He was able to dramatically improve infant health by establishing safe pediatric dosing levels of antibiotic drugs through his work with lab mice.

=== Children's Hospital of Philadelphia ===
In 1945, Coriell met Thomas McNair Scott, MD, who asked Coriell to join him at the Children's Hospital of Philadelphia. Scott would later recall his recruitment of Coriell as "one of the best things I ever did for Philadelphia."

His time at CHOP was consumed with culturing viruses outside of living organisms and became one of the first researchers to inoculate human skin cells with varicella-zoster virus, opening the possibility of cultivating the chicken pox to create a vaccine.

=== Camden Municipal Hospital ===
In the fall of 1948, Coriell was approached by Joseph Stokes, Jr., head of pediatrics at CHOP, and asked if he might be interested in becoming medical director and chief of staff at the Camden Municipal Hospital for Contagious Diseases. The 90-bed facility was one of the few remaining contagious disease hospitals in the United States.

=== Polio trials ===
John Enders learned that Coriell had developed a method of growing the Varicella zoster virus in a lab setting and visited him to learn about it. Enders imparted this knowledge to a man on his team named Thomas Weller who later tried this technique on the polio virus and found success. Enders, Weller and another member of their team were later awarded the Nobel Prize for their breakthrough.

In 1951, Coriell was selected to be the field director for the Polio Prevention Study, a double-blind test of gamma globulin inoculation.

In the late summer of that year, Coriell took his team of 30 to Provo, Utah to administer the first test inoculations. In total, 54,773 children received shots and of the 27,402 that received the inoculation in the double-blind trial, just 26 developed the disease, proof that the vaccine was effective.

=== South Jersey Medical Research Foundation ===
The Coriell Institute was chartered in 1953 as the South Jersey Medical Research Foundation. Coriell wanted a research facility where he could continue his work on tissue culturing methods as a method of addressing diseases.

With land donated by the City of Camden and the help of local business leaders, Coriell established his Foundation in 1956. The Foundation was the first nonprofit academic medical research institute in South Jersey.

In the following decades, the Foundation established its lauded biobank, conducted groundbreaking research, developed air filtration technology, advanced cell culture techniques and continued to advance science through research, biobanking and laboratory services. The Foundation was renamed in Coriell's honor when he retired in 1985.

=== The Clean Room Project ===
In 1965 the John A. Hartford Foundation awarded the Foundation a grant to study dust-free biomedical environments, beginning "the cleanroom project." Undetected contaminants can result in invalidated experiments, wasting time, talent, and money.

One of the first tools the Foundation tested was the laminar airflow hood, technology developed in the 1940s for aeronautical purposes. Working with James Horneff, who owned a canvas awning manufacturing business, they manufactured a laminar flow device that could be made of soft plastic, that was just as efficient as older models but vastly less expensive.

=== NIH contracts ===
In 1972, the center was awarded contracts by the National Institutes of Health to establish what has become the world's largest cell depository for the study of genetic and age-related diseases.

In the decades to follow, the collection has grown exponentially. By the mid-1990s, the NIGMS Human Genetic Cell Repository (NIGMS HGCR) catalog contained a wide variety of collections—cell lines and DNA representing human inherited genetic disorders, apparently healthy controls, human amniotic fluid cultures, fibroblasts representing chromosomal abnormalities, cell lines representing human populations from different geographic locations as well as different species, and much more.

== Personal life ==
Coriell was born June 19, 1911, in the agricultural community of Sciotoville, Ohio. In 1916, his family moved to Montana. He attended school in Stanford. Coriell excelled in sports in high school, playing both football and baseball.

He married Ester Lentz, a Missoulan and daughter of a prominent district court judge, on June 19, 1936, Coriell's 25th birthday. They had three sons, James, Steven, and Thomas. Two of Coriell's grandsons have participated in the Coriell Institute's annual Summer Experience for Students.

Coriell retired in 1985, turning over the Foundation to Gary McGarrity as acting president. On June 19, 2001, Coriell died at Cooper University Hospital in Camden.

== Awards and honors ==
=== Awards ===
- Distinguished Service Award, Camden County Junior Chamber of Commerce 1953
- Presidential Medal, International Poliomyelitis Congress 1957
- Man of the Year, Delaware Valley Council 1963
- Nominated, New Jersey Hall of Fame, Class of 2025

=== Honorary degrees, professional and honorary affiliations ===
- Alpha Omega Alpha, honorary medical society
