= Coriell Institute for Medical Research =

U.S. biomedical research center

Coordinates: 39.94059°N 75.11486°W

The Coriell Institute for Medical Research
- Established: 1953; 73 years ago
- Focus: human genome
- President and CEO: Jean-Pierre Issa
- Key people: Lewis L. Coriell
- Address: 403 Haddon Avenue, Camden, New Jersey, U.S.
- Location: Camden, New Jersey, U.S.
- Website: www.coriell.org/

The Coriell Institute for Medical Research is an independent, non-profit biomedical research institution, was founded by famed virologist Dr. Lewis L. Coriell in 1953.

For the past 73 years, in pursuit of preventing and curing diseases, scientists at the Coriell Institute for Medical Research have conducted research in infectious diseases, genetic diseases, cancer, aging and personalized medicine. Coriell researchers have generated biomaterials by establishing and curating biobanks, which now contain collections of cell lines, DNA, and other biomaterials gathered and distributed for use by the international research community.

The Coriell Institute holds one of the first two official cell banks recognized by the National Institutes of Health (NIH). In addition to its biobanks, Coriell researchers study aging, cancer, induced pluripotent stem cell science, epigenomics, pharmacogenomics and more.

The Institute ranks among the top 10 institutions in New Jersey in NIH funding.

Located in downtown Camden, New Jersey, the Institute has partnered with several prominent state and national health leaders, including Cooper University Health Care, Cooper Medical School of Rowan University, and the Van Andel Institute among others.

== History ==
Coriell Institute was chartered in 1953 as the South Jersey Medical Research Foundation Laboratory and constructed facilities in 1956. The laboratory was later named for director Lewis L. Coriell, who had worked at the Camden Municipal Hospital and developed aseptic tissue culture techniques that ultimately allowed poliovirus to be grown in culture. Dr. Coriell also led the field trials for the resulting vaccine. The Foundation was the first nonprofit academic medical research institute in South Jersey.

In November 2025, in partnership with the New Jersey Economic Development Authority, Coriell Institute broke ground on the new $95 million Coriell Institute Strategic Innovation Center at 1300 Walnut Street in Camden, which will serve as the institution's new headquarters, research center, and biorepository, in hopes that it will expand the life sciences sector in New Jersey. This new headquarters will replace their current headquarters on Haddon Avenue, which they have occupied since 1989.

== Operations ==
=== Biobanking ===
Regarded as one of the most diverse sources of cell lines and DNA available to the international research community, the Coriell Biorepositories maintain longstanding contracts with the National Institutes of Health and houses several significant collections, including the National Institute of General Medical Sciences Human Genetic Cell Repository, the National Institute of Neurological Disorders and Stroke Human Genetics DNA and Cell Line Repository, and the National Institute on Aging Cell Repository. The Institute houses cells for biotechnology companies and research foundations as well.

=== Research ===
In 2018, Coriell partnered with Cooper University Health Care and the Cooper Medical School of Rowan University to form the Camden Opioid Research Initiative (CORI), a state-funded research project studying risk factors for opioid use disorder. CORI utilizes a three-pronged approach: a study of chronic pain patients, a study of patients currently being treated for opioid use disorder, and the creation of a novel biobank of biological specimens as a resource for addiction researchers.

With these same partners, Coriell launched the Camden Cancer Research Center in 2023. Each of these three organizations has pledged an initial $1 million per year for 10 years, or a total of $30 million over 10 years, to investigate cancer and develop new therapies.

Coriell also contributes to the precision medicine space with its innovative research study, the Coriell Personalized Medicine Collaborative (CPMC). Launched in 2007, the CPMC was a longitudinal initiative involving a network of physicians, scientists, genetic counselors, and hospital and academic partners. The study aims to explore the clinical utility of genetic information and returned individualized reports to nearly 8,000 volunteer participants detailing genetic and non-genetic risks for complex diseases.

A spin-off company called Coriell Life Sciences was formed in January 2013 from a partnership between the Coriell Institute for Medical Research and IBM. The company offers full-service pharmacogenetics screening options to a range of different organizations.

=== Services ===
Coriell offers a diverse selection of services to customers and partners interested in outsourcing scientific work. Some of Coriell’s offered services include the creation of induced pluripotent stem cell lines, cell line authentication, cytogenetic analysis, DNA and RNA isolation, and public and private biobanking services.

Coriell’s quality management system has been certified to the latest ISO 9001:2015 standards.
