= South Jersey =

Geographic region of the U.S. state of New Jersey

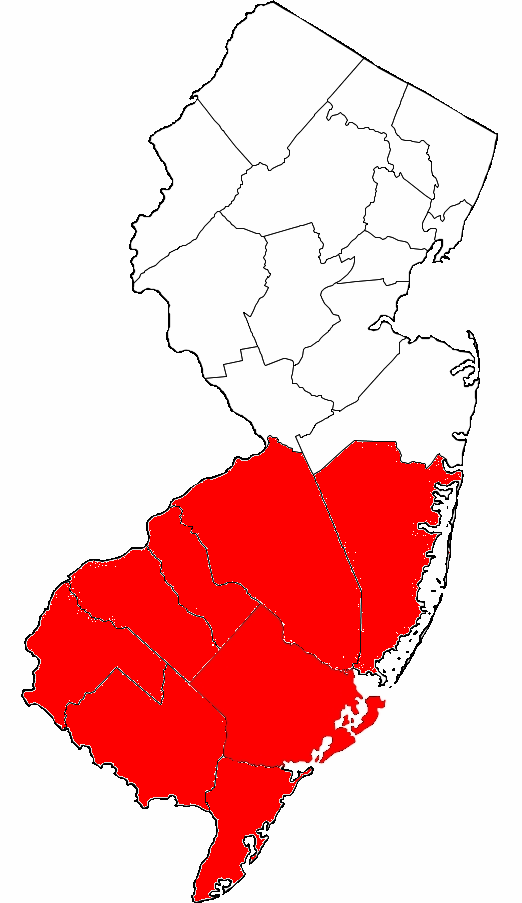
- Counties within the maximum definition of South Jersey; Ocean County is often excluded from the definition of the region
- Country: United States
- State: New Jersey
- Largest city: Cherry Hill
- Counties: List: Atlantic; Burlington; Camden; Cape May; Cumberland; Gloucester; Salem
- Time zone: UTC−5 (EST)
  - Summer (DST): UTC−4 (EDT)

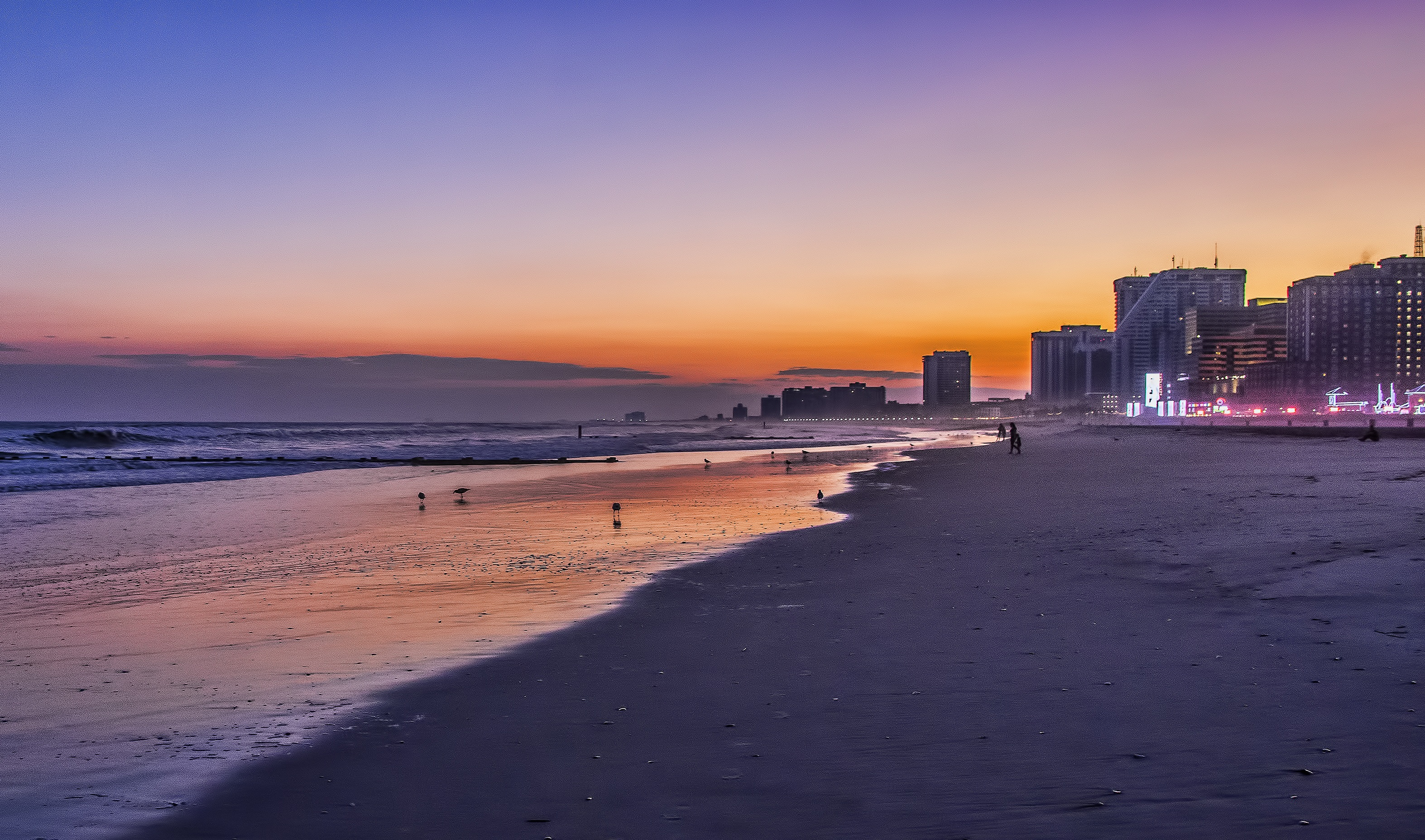
A September 2017 sunset on the beach in Atlantic City, a seaside resort famous for the world's first boardwalk and its casino gambling

South Jersey, also known as Southern New Jersey, comprises the southern portion of the U.S. state of New Jersey. It is located between Pennsylvania and the lower Delaware River to its west, the Atlantic Ocean to its east, Delaware to its south, and Central Jersey or North Jersey to its north, depending on the definition of North Jersey.

South Jersey is part of the Philadelphia metropolitan area, the seventh-largest metropolitan region in the nation with 6.288 million residents in the core metropolitan statistical area and 7.366 million residents in the combined statistical area of Camden, Philadelphia and Wilmington, as of 2020. South Jersey is known for containing the unique ecoregion known as the Pine Barrens, which remains largely undisturbed despite its location within the Northeastern megalopolis. The South Jersey Pine Barrens are the largest remaining example of the Atlantic coastal pine barrens ecosystem.

Benjamin Franklin is said to have called New Jersey "a barrel tapped at both ends", referencing the Philadelphia influence on South Jersey and the New York City influence on North Jersey. South Jersey is generally defined geographically as the area below I-195 that includes the state's lower seven counties: Atlantic, Burlington, Camden, Cape May, Cumberland, Gloucester, and Salem, and occasionally an eighth, Ocean.

South Jersey and the wider Philadelphia metropolitan area are situated near the center of the Northeast megalopolis and have become a U.S. East Coast epicenter for logistics and warehouse construction; Salem County, the lower portion of Gloucester County, and the upper portion of Cumberland County additionally serve as residential communities for the petrochemical industry of New Castle County, Delaware. South Jersey shore communities, including Atlantic City and others in Atlantic and Cape May counties, have a distinct economy centered around the tourism industry. Burlington, Camden, and Gloucester counties have several older streetcar towns, and many residents from these three counties commute to Philadelphia, the nation's sixth-most populous city, which is located immediately west of South Jersey across the Delaware River, accessible by the Benjamin Franklin Bridge, Betsy Ross Bridge, Tacony Palmyra Bridge and Walt Whitman Bridge.

The designation of South Jersey with a distinct toponym is a colloquialism rather than an administrative definition and reflects geographical and perceived cultural and other differences between South Jersey and the northern part of the state.

== Geography ==
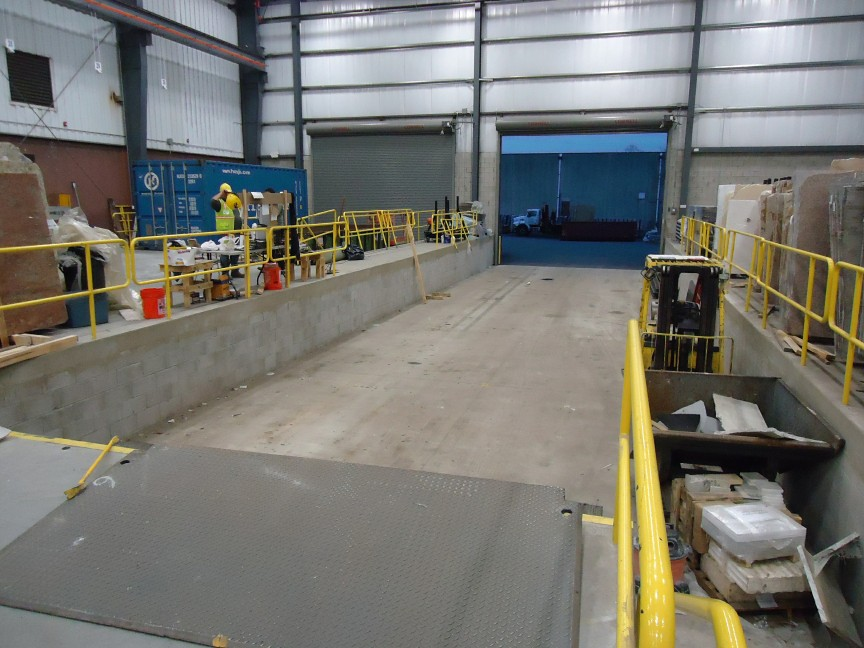
A warehouse in South Jersey, a U.S. East Coast epicenter for logistics and warehouse construction

=== Topography ===
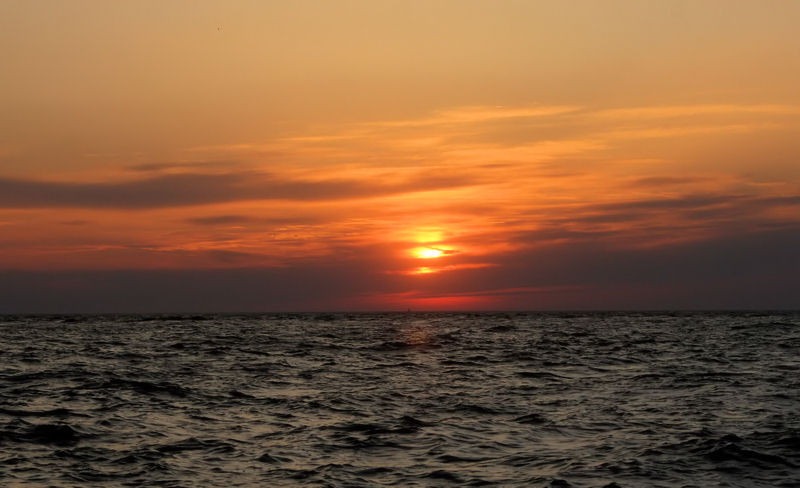
Sunset Beach on Cape May in May 2009

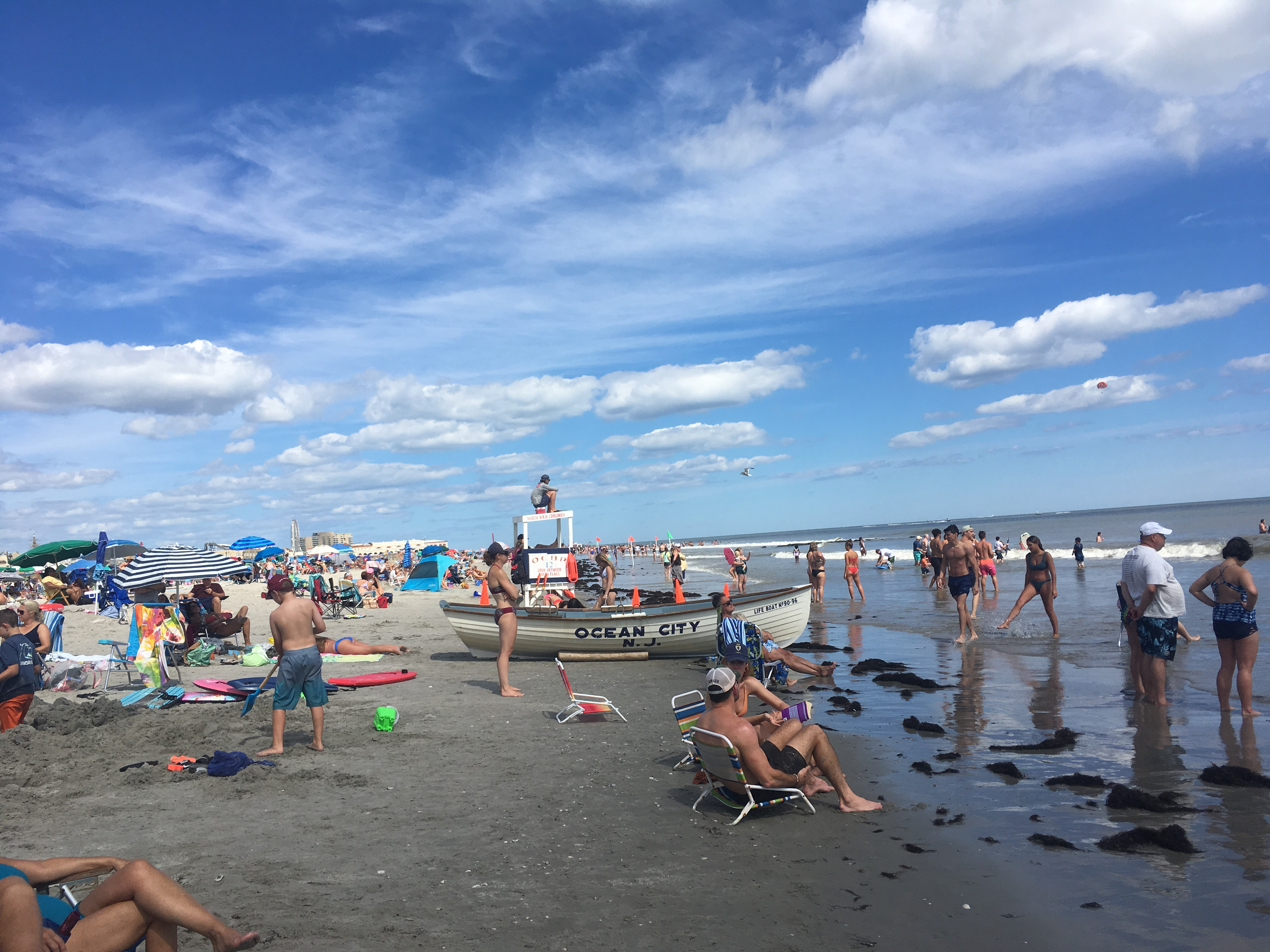
The beach in Ocean City in August 2020

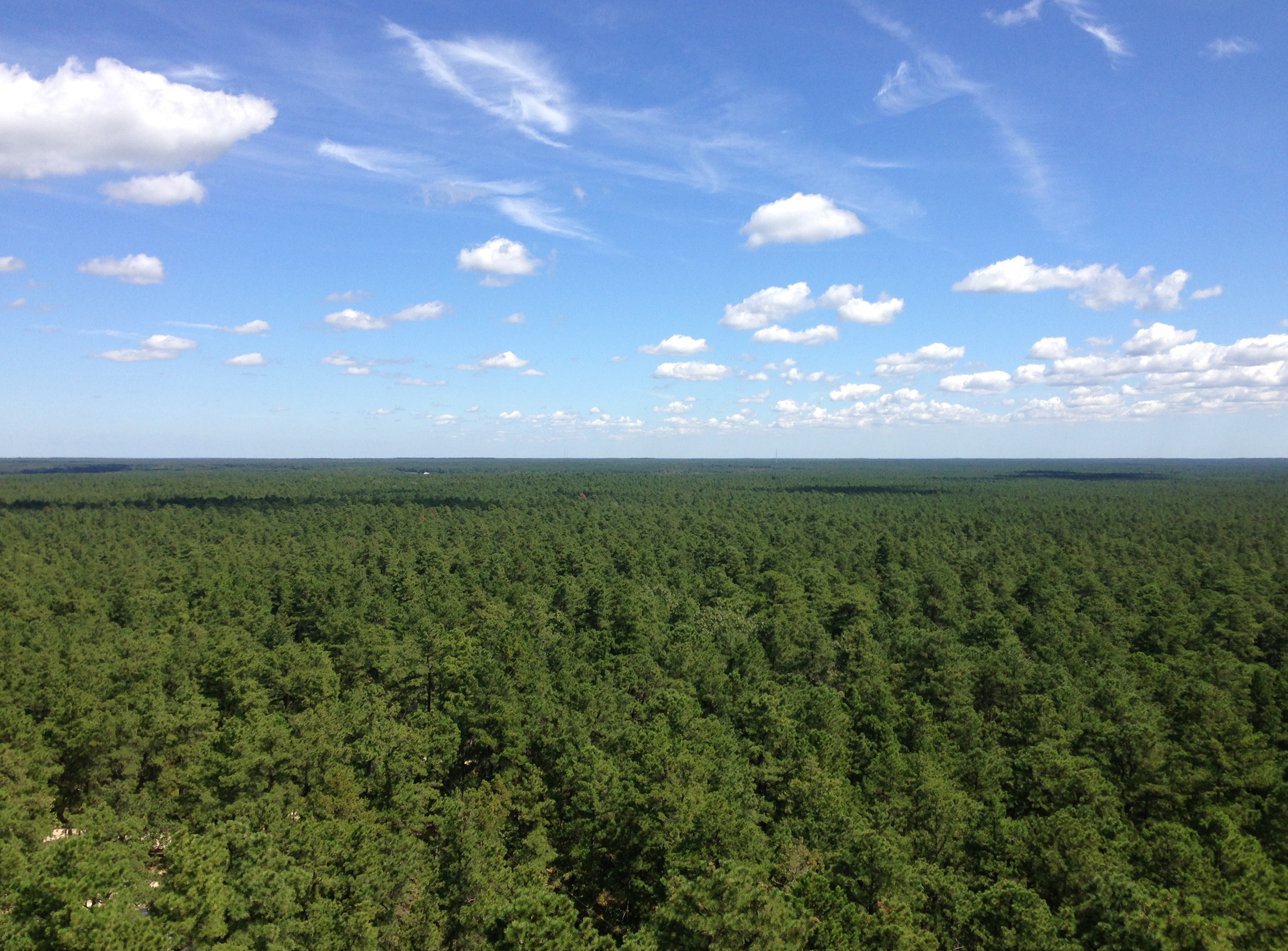
The New Jersey Pine Barrens seen from Apple Pie Hill in August 2014

South Jersey is a peninsula bordered by the Atlantic Ocean to its southeast, the Delaware Bay to its southwest, and the Delaware River to its northwest. All of South Jersey is part of the Atlantic Plain, a landform of broad plains and gently sloping hills that extends southward from the New York Bight to Florida. Much of the Atlantic Plain is covered by pine and oak-pine forests and salt marshes and is underlain by poorly consolidated sedimentary formations from the Cretaceous, Tertiary, and Quaternary ages that dip seaward. The Atlantic Coastal Plain can be divided into three physiographic subprovinces: the Inner Lowlands, Outer Lowlands, and Central Uplands.

The Inner Lowlands region encompasses the low valley along the Delaware River, with an elevation ranging from 50 feet (15 m) to 100 feet (30 m), and the Outer Lowlands encompasses the area near the Atlantic Ocean with an elevation that rarely exceeds 50 feet (15 m). The Inner Lowlands are fertile due to the deposition of sediment in the region, which makes it an ideal region for agriculture. The Outer Lowlands is dominated by coastal estuaries, swamplands, and barrier islands near the Atlantic Ocean and is generally infertile. The Central Uplands varies slightly from the Lowlands in altitude and is covered by the New Jersey Pine Barrens. The Uplands has rolling hills at an elevation over 50 feet, rarely exceeding 200 feet in elevation, along with sandy, acidic soil that is unsuitable for agriculture. Commercial farming in the Pine Barrens is limited to plants that thrive in its nutrient-poor soil, generally restricted to acidic fruits. In the Pine Barrens, cranberries and blueberries are cultivated in lowland bogs that have accumulated depths of organic matter.

=== Climate ===
South Jersey has a humid subtropical climate. Compared to northern parts of New Jersey, South Jersey has slightly higher temperatures and receives less annual precipitation. Along the Jersey Shore, temperatures are moderated by sea breezes.

== Counties ==
The following seven counties are completely included in South Jersey:

- Atlantic County
- Burlington County
- Camden County
- Cape May County
- Cumberland County
- Gloucester County
- Salem County

Some definitions of South Jersey include the southern portion of Ocean County.

In April 2015, an NJ.com poll with 90,000 respondents asked readers to identify the communities in North, Central, and South Jersey. Barnegat, Eagleswood, Lacey Township, Little Egg Harbor, Long Beach Island, Ocean Township, Stafford Township, and Tuckerton were all voted as part of South Jersey. The Ocean County communities north of Lacey Township were considered to be part of Central Jersey. The northernmost communities of Burlington County was also voted part of Central Jersey.

== Cities ==
=== Principal cities ===
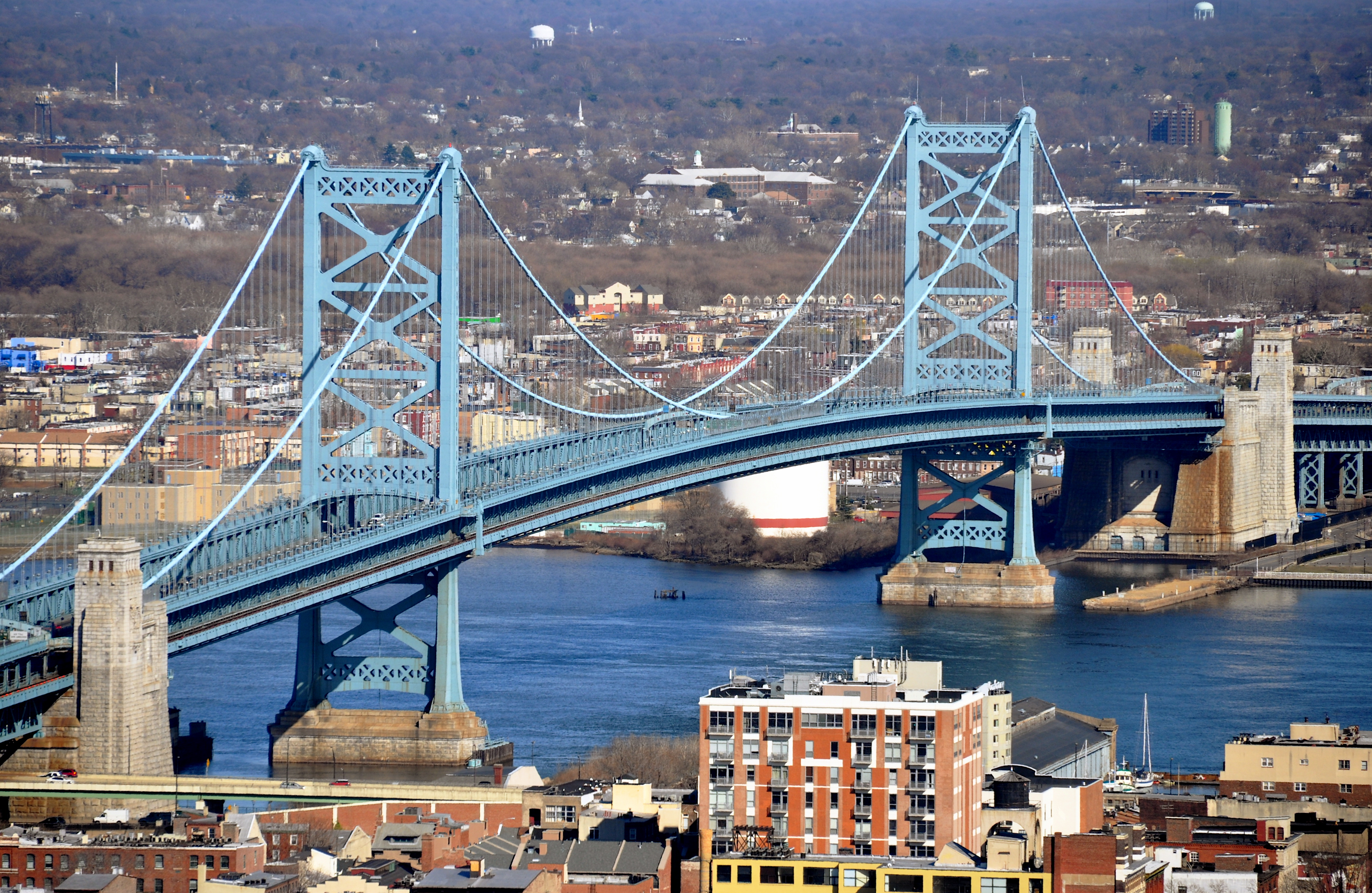
The Ben Franklin Bridge, the oldest of the four vehicular bridges crossing the Delaware River and connecting Philadelphia with South Jersey

Camden, located across the Delaware River from Philadelphia, has historically been considered the economic hub of South Jersey. Much of Camden's growth resulted from its location near Philadelphia and its role as a regional transportation hub. For decades following World War II, Camden suffered a prolonged economic decline and high crime rate due to the loss of its manufacturing base and the outflow of middle-class residents to the suburbs. Campbell's Soup headquarters and the new corporate headquarters of Susquehanna Bank. Rutgers University–Camden, Rutgers Law School, Cooper Medical School of Rowan University, Cooper University Hospital, and the Camden campus of Camden County College operate in Camden, and the Camden Waterfront is one of the city's main attractions. Nearby, Cherry Hill, the second largest municipality in South Jersey and the 12th largest in New Jersey by population, is an edge city that also serves as a regional economic center. Pureland Industrial Complex, the nation's largest industrial park, is located 12 miles from the port of Camden in Logan Township.

Atlantic City is a major tourist destination that is famous for its beaches, boardwalk, and casino gambling. Atlantic City is located in the Jersey Shore region on Absecon Island, along with Ventnor City, Margate City, and Longport. Atlantic City became a resort town in 1854, when train service to the city allowed beachgoers from Philadelphia to vacation in the city. The first boardwalk in the world opened in the city in 1870, and large hotels were built in the early 20th century to accommodate visitors. In the mid-20th century, Atlantic City declined as a tourist destination due to competition from other resorts made accessible by automobile and aircraft. After New Jersey voters approved casino gambling in Atlantic City in a 1976 referendum, it became the first legalized casino gambling destination in the Eastern United States. Recent growth in the city has been fueled by the casino industry, and Atlantic City is the second-largest casino gaming market in the United States behind Las Vegas.

=== Metropolitan areas ===
According to the U.S. Census Bureau, Burlington, Camden, and Gloucester Counties are part of the Camden metropolitan division with an estimated population of 1,250,569 as of 2008. Salem County is part of the Wilmington metropolitan division. The Camden and Wilmington metropolitan divisions are part of the larger Philadelphia–Camden–Wilmington metropolitan statistical area, the eighth largest MSA in the U.S. Cumberland County is part of the Vineland–Millville–Bridgeton Metropolitan Statistical Area. Atlantic City and its surrounding region in Atlantic County are part of the Atlantic City metropolitan area, which had an estimated 2008 population of 270,681. Cape May County is part of the Ocean City metropolitan area with an estimated 2008 population of 95,838. Atlantic, Cape May, and Cumberland counties are all part of the Philadelphia-Camden-Vineland combined statistical area.

Ocean County, with a 2020 population of 637,229, is considered part of the New York–North Jersey–Long Island Metropolitan Statistical Area, which encompasses all of North Jersey and Central Jersey with the exception of Warren County. However, much of Ocean County lies in both New York City and Philadelphia media markets.

== Population ==
Municipalities with over 20,000 population
2020 Rank	Municipality	County	Population in 2020	Population in 2010	Municipal Type
1	Cherry Hill	Camden	74,553	71,045	Township
2	Camden	Camden	71,791	77,344	City
3	Gloucester Township	Camden	66,034	64,634	Township
4	Vineland	Cumberland	60,780	60,724	City
5	Washington Township	Gloucester	48,677	48,559	Township
6	Egg Harbor Township	Atlantic	47,842	43,323	Township
7	Evesham Township	Burlington	46,826	45,538	Township
8	Mount Laurel	Burlington	44,633	41,864	Township
9	Winslow Township	Camden	39,907	39,499	Township
10	Atlantic City	Atlantic	38,497	39,558	City
11	Galloway Township	Atlantic	37,813	37,349	Township
12	Monroe Township	Gloucester	37,117	36,129	Township
13	Pennsauken Township	Camden	37,074	35,885	Township
14	Deptford	Gloucester	31,997	30,561	Township
15	Willingboro Township	Burlington	31,889	31,629	Township
16	Voorhees	Camden	31,069	29,131	Township
17	Millville	Cumberland	27,491	28,370	City
18	Hamilton Township	Atlantic	27,484	26,342	Township
19	Bridgeton	Cumberland	27,263	24,958	City
20	Pemberton Township	Burlington	26,903	27,644	Township
21	Medford	Burlington	24,497	22,999	Township
22	Burlington Township	Burlington	23,983	22,306	Township
23	Glassboro	Gloucester	23,149	18,533	Borough
24	West Deptford	Gloucester	22,197	21,528	Township
25	Lower Township	Cape May	22,057	22,844	Township
26	Lindenwold	Camden	21,641	17,479	Borough
27	Moorestown	Burlington	21,355	20,554	Township
28	Pleasantville	Atlantic	20,629	20,149	City
29	Middle Township	Cape May	20,380	18,791	Township

County Population
Rank	County	Population	County Seat	Area
1	Camden	523,485	Camden	222 sq mi (575 km^{2})
2	Burlington	461,860	Mount Holly	805 sq mi (2,085 km^{2})
3	Gloucester	302,294	Woodbury	325 sq mi (842 km^{2})
4	Atlantic	274,534	Mays Landing	561 sq mi (1,453 km^{2})
5	Cumberland	154,152	Bridgeton	489 sq mi (1,267 km^{2})
6	Cape May	95,263	Cape May Court House	255 sq mi (660 km2)
7	Salem	64,837	Salem	338 sq mi (875 km^{2})

== History ==
=== Native Americans ===
Present-day South Jersey was first inhabited by the Lenape and was the site of the first Indian reservation. The tribe spoke Unami dialects, part of the Algonquian language family. Because the Lenape were concentrated around the Delaware River and its tributaries, Europeans later named them the Delaware Indians. After the arrival of the Europeans, the Lenape population dwindled quickly due to disease and conflict. Those who were left migrated north or west, or became integrated into local settler communities.

=== Colonial period ===
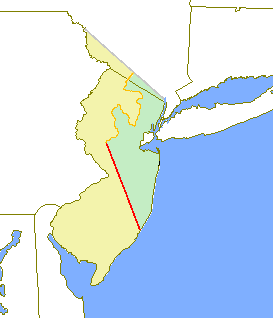
Between 1674 and 1702, nearly all of present-day South Jersey was part of the Province of West Jersey shown in yellow; the Keith line is shown in red.

Although present-day South Jersey was claimed by the Dutch in 1609, the Dutch used the region primarily for trading purposes. In 1638, New Sweden was established along the Delaware River. The Swedes established two permanent settlements in present-day South Jersey: Swedesboro and Bridgeport, formerly named New Stockholm. New Sweden was captured by the Dutch in 1655, and remained part of New Netherland until its cession to the British in 1667.

During the British colonial period, nearly all of South Jersey was part of the Province of West Jersey between 1674 and 1702 as a Quaker commonwealth. Burlington, the capital of West Jersey, was established in 1677, and Camden was established in 1681. Since the Delaware River was not easily navigable north of Trenton, the population was concentrated along the southern Delaware River. The borders between West Jersey and East Jersey, first surveyed using the Keith line, ran diagonally across the middle part of the state. The borders remained important in determining ownership and political boundaries until 1745. Remnants of that division are seen today, notably as the Burlington-Monmouth and Burlington-Ocean County lines and the municipal boundaries within Ocean County. In contemporary culture, the border signifies a functional boundary between the New York City and Philadelphia spheres of influence.

By 1700, nearly 70% of the population of West Jersey were Quakers of English or Irish origin. The Quakers, who believed in peace, equality, and integrity, influenced early New Jersey. In contrast, East Jersey had high proportions of Scottish and Dutch settlers. In 1702, East Jersey and West Jersey were reunited under the reign of Queen Anne.

=== American Revolution ===
Resistance to the British was widespread during the American Revolution among South Jersey Presbyterians, who aided the colonists during the Revolutionary War. Several Presbyterian preachers, including John Brainerd, accepted military positions and urged Presbyterians to enlist in the army. During the war, the Delaware River was strategic for its commercial importance and its role in defending Philadelphia. General Howe captured Philadelphia in September 1777, occupying the city for 10 months. The Quakers as a whole were opposed to the Revolution on their principles of nonviolence. Members of the Religious Society of Friends were forbidden to support the local militias, or faced disownment by the Quakers.

=== 19th century ===
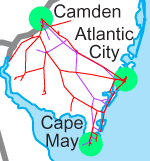
The extensive passenger and freight network, now part of Conrail Shared Assets Operations, which once served South Jersey

For many years, South Jersey has been mistakenly perceived solely as an agricultural society. In the 18th century, South Jersey, including Alloway in Salem County, was home to Wistarburg, the first successful glass factory in the colonies, operating for close to 50 years prior to the Revolutionary War. When that factory closed, the workers spread throughout the region to South Jersey towns, including Millville, Vineland Bridgeton, Hammonton, and Glassboro where they established new companies. Recent research has uncovered evidence that, in addition to the glassmaking industry, South Jersey was also a major contributor to the iron, coal making, ship building and, later, textile industries. Other businesses that later operated in the region included shoe manufacturers, button makers, barrel makers, and rug companies. While most industries eventually declined, farming still made up the larger portion of the region's economy. South Jersey's interior, consisting of the New Jersey Pine Barrens and marshland, remained unpopulated because its acidic, nutrient-poor soil that was unsuited for farming. Most of the cities were concentrated along the Delaware River except for a few settlements and seaside resorts along the Jersey Shore.

Slavery was less extensive in South Jersey than it was in other parts of the state because of the Quakers' religious opposition to it, and a lower demand for labor in the region. By 1810, the population of slaves dwindled to 328 total, compared to 10,532 total slaves in the rest of New Jersey. Although discriminatory policies still targeted blacks, South Jersey became a haven for ex-slaves. William Still, a notable African-American abolitionist, was born in Burlington County, and is nicknamed the "father of the Underground Railroad" for his role in helping slaves escape to freedom.

Railroads came into operation in South Jersey by the mid-19th century. The advent of the railroad was one of the reasons Charles K. Landis was inspired to found Vineland in 1861. The rail system expanded dramatically during that period, helping a number of towns to grow and thrive. Many of the railroads were later consolidated into the West Jersey and Seashore Railroad (WJ&S). By 1925, it operated 379 miles of road on 717 miles of track. In 1933, it became part of Pennsylvania-Reading Seashore Lines, a Pennsylvania Railroad subsidiary. Much of the system is part of the South Jersey/Philadelphia Shared Assets Area. The Glassboro–Camden Line, a light rail system, is currently under construction.

=== 20th century ===
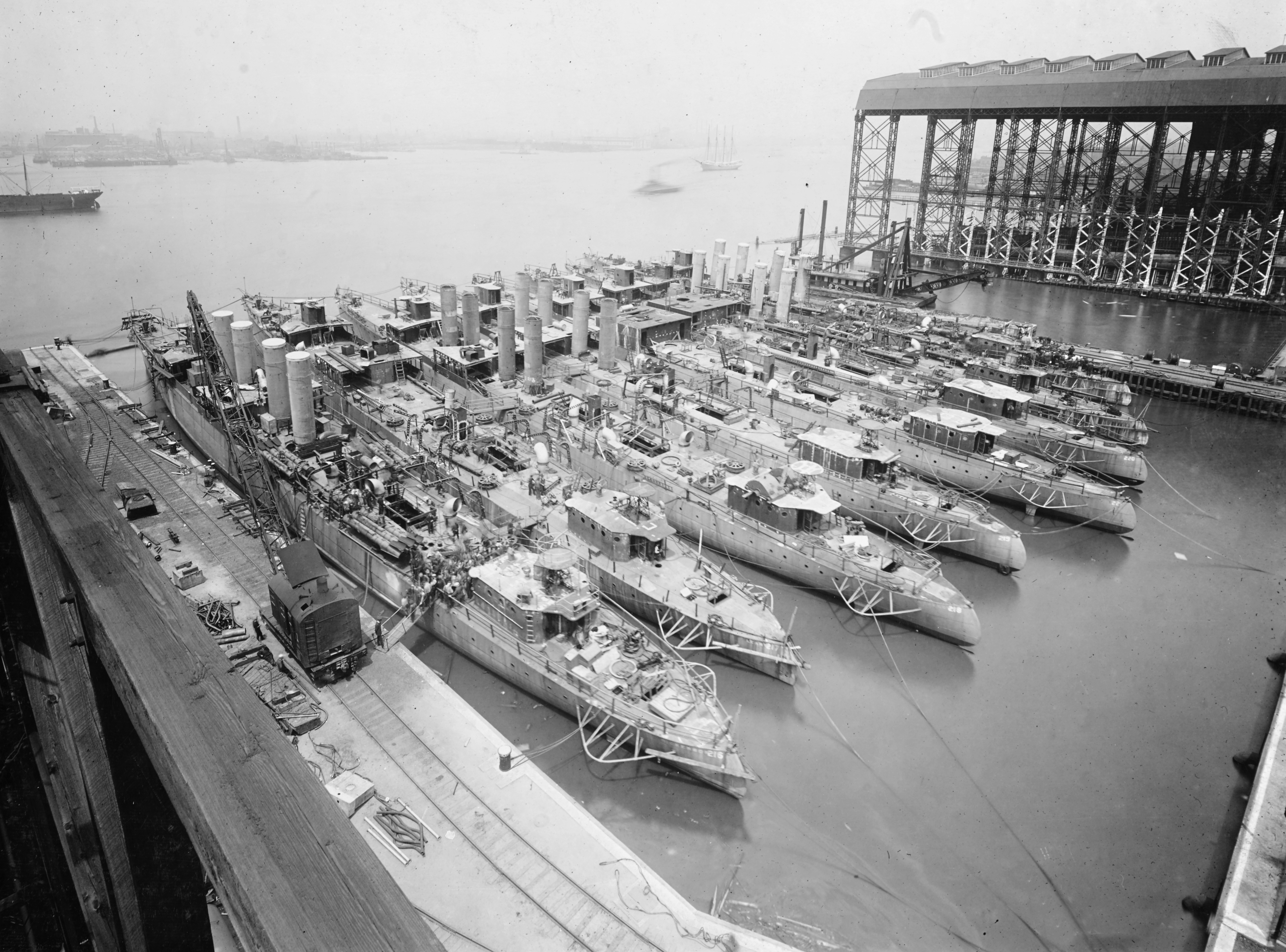
Eight Wickes-class destroyers in the New York Shipbuilding Corporation shipyard in Camden in 1919

Beginning in the early 20th century, the towns bordering the Delaware River saw increased manufacturing due to improved transportation and technology. A year before the turn of the century, in 1899, John Thompson Dorrance, a chemist for Campbell Soup Company, perfected his method of canning condensed soup. This allowed Campbell to ship and sell its product at one-third the cost. Campbell had national distribution by 1911 when its products were first marketed in California. The New York Shipbuilding Corporation opened its first shipyard in 1900 in Camden. The company produced a variety of ships, ranging from aircraft carriers and battleships to luxury liners and barges. By 1917, NYSB was the world's largest shipyard. The Victor Talking Machine Company, founded in 1901, became the leading American producer of phonographs and phonograph records.

Like many American cities after World War II, South Jersey cities where heavy manufacturing was a predominant industry declined as factories closed and residents moved away. Suburbanization of the region was fueled by the construction of new highways and bridges, and increased automobile ownership. The New Jersey Turnpike opened in 1951, permitting fast travel by car between New York and Delaware. In 1955, William Levitt built present-day Willingboro based on his Levittown model, which came to be used for other suburban developments. The population of Delaware Township in Camden County rose explosively after World War II, growing from about 10,000 residents in 1950 to almost 65,000 by 1970. In 1961, the township was renamed Cherry Hill. In contrast, nearby Camden declined from 125,000 residents in 1950 to 85,000 in 1980. While the South Jersey suburbs remain general middle-class, the inner cities continue to face issues with crime, poverty, and unemployment.

==== Statehood movement ====
Albert Freeman, a Mount Holly newspaper publisher and editor, wrote an editorial calling for secession. Freeman originally meant the proposal as a joke, but the idea gained momentum. On April 23, 1980, the town council of Egg Harbor voted to support the creation of a new state of South Jersey. The statehood movement was an attempt to gain the attention of state lawmakers, centering on issues such as the construction of the Meadowlands Sports Complex in the north while the state refused to support the Garden State Park Racetrack in the south. A non-binding referendum was presented to six counties in 1980 (with the exclusion of Camden and Gloucester counties), and 51 percent of voters declared that they wanted to secede and establish a new state; Ocean County was the only southern county of six that voted to defeat the referendum.

== Economic environment ==
In 2005, Money magazine declared Moorestown as the "best place to live" in the United States, although they stated that a number of nearby municipalities could have just as easily been given the distinction.

Conversely, Morgan Quitno has rated nearby Camden the "most dangerous city" in the United States three times within the same decade and Camden had a median household income of $18,007 in 2006, making it the poorest U.S. city with over 65,000 residents. Moorestown and Camden share a central highway, NJ County Road 537.

== Demographics ==
The average income for a household in South Jersey was $63,834.54, and the population was 65.3% non-Hispanic White, 15.9% non-Hispanic Black, 11.6% Hispanic or Latino of any race, 4.2% non-Hispanic Asian, and 3.0% non-Hispanic other or mixed race. South Jersey had a total population of 1,854,453 in 2010 (up from 693,402 in 1940) if the counties of Camden, Burlington, Gloucester, Salem, Atlantic, Cape May, and Cumberland are included.

== Colleges and universities ==
- Cooper Medical School of Rowan University
- Georgian Court University
- Kean University-Ocean County campus
- Rowan University
- Rowan-Virtua School of Osteopathic Medicine
- Rutgers University–Camden
- Rutgers Law School
- Stockton University in Galloway Township and its satellite campus in Stafford Township

=== Community colleges ===
- Atlantic Cape Community College
- Camden County College
- Ocean County College
- Rowan College at Burlington County
- Rowan College of South Jersey, Gloucester and Cumberland campuses
- Salem Community College

Additionally, Rutgers University has academic satellites at Atlantic Cape Community College in Mays Landing and Camden County Community College in Blackwood. Rutgers also has a number of research field stations located in South Jersey, including the Philip E. Marucci Center for Blueberry and Cranberry Research and Extension in Chatsworth and the Rutgers University Marine Field Station in Tuckerton.

== Sports ==
Many South Jerseyans root for Philadelphia professional sports teams including the Phillies, Eagles, Flyers, 76ers, and Union. In southern Ocean County, there is a strong mix of Philadelphia and New York sports fans since the county's media markets overlap. While there are no major league teams in South Jersey, in recent seasons the 76ers have held training camp at Stockton University in Galloway Township. In 2016, the 76ers opened a practice facility on the Camden waterfront. The Flyers practice in Voorhees at the local Skate Zone.

South Jersey has been home to a number of minor league teams. The Jersey Shore BlueClaws play in Lakewood and are an affiliate of the Phillies. Minor league soccer is also played in South Jersey, as the Ocean City Nor'easters of the Premier Development League are based in Ocean City. The Nor'easters play their home games at Carey Stadium.

In 2007, the WNBA was considering expansion in Atlantic City. The Atlantic City ownership group competed with other groups from Philadelphia, Atlanta, Kansas City, Albuquerque, Colorado, and the San Francisco Bay Area. In the end, the expansion franchise was awarded to Atlanta.

South Jersey was home to the now-defunct independent league baseball teams the Atlantic City Surf and Camden Riversharks. Outside of baseball, South Jersey was also home to the Atlantic City Boardwalk Bullies, a minor league ice hockey team affiliated with the East Coast Hockey League. The Jersey Knights of the World Hockey Association played at the Cherry Hill Arena in Cherry Hill from 1973 to 1974. Previously, the minor league Jersey Devils of the Eastern Hockey League played at the same location from 1964 to 1973.

== Commercial centers and resorts ==
South Jersey's regional commercial centers include: Cherry Hill, Camden, and Atlantic City with its resort casinos, boardwalk, shopping, and beaches.

Other South Jersey Seaside resorts and commercial centers include:

- Avalon
- Brigantine
- Cape May
- Longport
- Margate
- Ocean City
- Sea Isle City
- Stone Harbor
- Strathmere
- The Wildwoods (including Wildwood, North Wildwood, and Wildwood Crest)
- Ventnor

== Media ==
South Jersey is part of the Philadelphia television and radio market. Newspapers in the region include the Courier-Post, which refers to itself as "South Jersey's Newspaper" and is based in Camden County. It covers all of South Jersey but focuses primarily on these three counties. The South Jersey Times, based in Mullica Hill, also covers South Jersey but spotlights Gloucester, Cumberland, and Salem counties.

== Notable residents ==
Some nationally known South Jerseyans include Bruce Willis, Mike Trout, Roscoe Lee Browne, John Forsythe, Ali Larter, Kelly Ripa, Tara Lipinski, Michael Landon, Linda Fiorentino, Joe Flacco, Carl Lewis, Grace Helbig, Martin Truex Jr., Steve Kaplan, Carli Lloyd and Hope Sawyer Buyukmihci. See also:

- People from Atlantic County
- People from Burlington County
- People from Camden County
- People from Cape May County
- People from Cumberland County
- People from Gloucester County
- People from Ocean County (some consider this Central Jersey)
- People from Salem County

== Culture and business ==
A list of unique and notable South Jersey cultural and business institutions includes, but is not limited, to:

- Absecon Light
- Adventure Aquarium
- Barnegat Light
- Batsto Village
- Blueberry farms in Hammonton
- Cape May Light
- Casinos in Atlantic City
- Clementon Amusement Park
- Commerce Bank
- Cooper River
- Cranberry bogs
- Double Trouble State Park
- Garden State Park Racetrack
- Hadrosaurus
- Hereford Inlet Light
- Historic Smithville
- Indian King Tavern
- Island Beach State Park
- Jersey Devil
- Jughandles
- Lucy the Elephant
- New Jersey Pine Barrens
- New Jersey Pinelands National Reserve
- Nipper Building
- Ocean City Boardwalk
- "On the Way to Cape May"
- Oyster Creek Nuclear Generating Station
- PATCO High Speed Line
- Perkins Center for the Arts in Moorestown and Collingswood
- Popcorn Park Zoo
- Shore Culture
- Six Flags Great Adventure
- Traffic circles
- Surflight Theatre
- Tuckerton Seaport
- Walt Whitman House
- Washington Street Mall
- WheatonArts
- Wildwood Boardwalk
- USS New Jersey

== South Jersey English ==
South Jersey is within the Philadelphia dialect region. One recognizable feature of this is the pronunciation of /oʊ/ (the vowel in go) as [əʊ], and this can also be found elsewhere in Pennsylvania, Maryland, and Delaware.

Visitors to South Jersey will notice the following usages standard in the Philadelphia metropolitan area:

- Hoagie: This usual term for what might elsewhere be called a submarine sandwich.
- Wooder: the first syllable in the word water is pronounced like the word "wood".
- Shoobie: slang used by year-long residents of the coast for vacationing visitors to the shore, often from Philadelphia or New York City.

== See also ==
- Central Jersey
- North Jersey
