= John C. Norcross =

American psychologist

John Norcross, Ph.D.
- Born: 1957 (age 68–69); Camden, New Jersey, U.S.
- Education: Rutgers University (BA); University of Rhode Island (MA, PhD)
- Relatives: George Norcross (brother); Donald Norcross (brother)

John C. Norcross (born 1957) is an American professor, clinical psychologist, and author in self-help, psychotherapy and behavior change. He is Distinguished Professor and former chair of psychology at the University of Scranton and Clinical Professor of Psychiatry at SUNY Upstate Medical University. He also maintained a part-time practice of clinical psychology in Scranton, Pennsylvania for 36 years.

Norcross has authored or edited more than 400 publications and over 20 books, including the self-help works Changeology and Changing for Good (with James O. Prochaska and Carlo C. DiClemente).

== Early life and education ==
Norcross was born in 1957 at Cooper University Hospital in Camden, New Jersey, the son of George E. Norcross, Jr. and Carol C. Norcross. He and his three brothers, George Norcross III, Congressman Donald Norcross, and attorney Philip A. Norcross, were raised in Pennsauken and Merchantville, New Jersey.

He earned a B.A. in psychology from Rutgers University (magna cum laude), followed by an M.A. and Ph.D. in clinical psychology from the University of Rhode Island. He completed his clinical psychology internship at the Brown University School of Medicine.

== Career ==
Norcross joined the University of Scranton faculty in 1985, progressing from assistant professor to associate professor and professor before being named Distinguished Professor.

He holds clinical professorships in psychiatry and behavioral sciences at SUNY Upstate Medical University and clinical sciences at Geisinger Commonwealth Medical College.

He also served as a research fellow in the University of Rhode Island Self-Change Laboratory early in his career.

Norcross has been elected as president of the American Psychological Association Division of Psychotherapy, the Society of Clinical Psychology, the Society for the Exploration of Psychotherapy Integration (SEPI), and the International Society of Clinical Psychology.

== Research ==
Norcross has been involved in research on therapeutic relationships and personalizing psychotherapy. His work with colleagues has led to meta‑analytic summaries that describe how therapists can personalize treatments to individual client characteristics, such as culture, attachment style, preferences, coping preferences, and stage of change, to optimize therapy effectiveness.

Norcross's scholarship concerns behavior change, both within and outside of formal psychotherapy. He has published on the processes by which individuals initiate, sustain, and relapse in change efforts, drawing on the transtheoretical model and systematic studies of populations attempting self‑change.

Norcross's research also encompasses psychotherapy integration, an area that seeks to unify diverse therapeutic approaches by identifying shared mechanisms and principles of change. His edited volumes and handbook chapters elaborate ways to integrate specific ingredients of different therapies with common‑factor processes, proposing principle‑based models supported by empirical research.

== Awards ==
- Distinguished Contributions to Education and Training Award from the American Psychological Association
- Pennsylvania Professor of the Year, Carnegie Foundation for the Advancement of Teaching
- Ernest R. Hilgard Lifetime Achievement Award (APA Division of General Psychology)
- Distinguished Practitioner, National Academies of Practice
- Wellner Lifetime Achievement Award, National Register of Health Service Psychologists
- Distinguished Psychologist Award (APA Division of Psychotherapy)
- Member of the National Academies of Practice

He has also been listed among the top 2% of scientists worldwide in citation-based rankings and among the most highly ranked scholars in psychotherapy.

== Selected books ==
- Prochaska, J. O., & Norcross, J. C. (2024). Systems of psychotherapy: A transtheoretical analysis (10th ed.). Oxford University Press.
- Sayette, M. A., & Norcross, J. C. (2026). Insider's Guide to graduate programs in clinical and counseling psychology. 2026-2028 edition.Guilford Press.
- Hill, C. E., & Norcross, J. C. (2023). Psychotherapy skills and methods that work. Oxford University Press.
- Norcross, J.C., & Cooper, M. (2021). Personalizing psychotherapy: Assessing and accommodating patient preferences. American Psychological Association.
- Norcross, J. C., & Goldfried, M. R. (2019). (Eds.). Handbook of psychotherapy integration (3rd ed.). Oxford University Press.
- Norcross, J. C., & Lambert, M. J. (2019). (Eds.). Psychotherapy relationships that work. Volume 1: Evidence-based therapist contributions (3rd ed.). Oxford University Press.
- Norcross, J. C., & Wampold, B. E. (2019). (Eds.). Psychotherapy relationships that work. Volume 2: Evidence-based responsiveness (3rd ed.). Oxford University Press.
- Norcross, J. C., & VandenBos, G. R. (2018). Leaving it at the office: A guide to psychotherapist self-care (2nd ed.). Guilford Press.
- Norcross, J. C., & Popple, L. M. (2017). Supervision essentials for integrative psychotherapy. American Psychological Association. ISBN 978-1433826283
- Norcross, J. C., Hogan, T. P., Koocker, G. P., & Maggio, L. A. (2017). Clinician's guide to evidence-based practices: Behavioral health and addictions (2nd ed.). Oxford University Press. ISBN 978-0195335323
- Norcross, J. C., VandenBos, G. R., & Freedheim, D. F. (Eds.) (2016). APA handbook of clinical psychology (5 volumes). American Psychological Association. ISBN 978-1433821295
- Norcross, J. C., Campbell, L. M., Grohol, J. M., Santrock, J. W., Selagea, F., & Sommer, R. (2013). Self-help that works: resources to improve emotional health and strengthen relationships (4th ed.).Oxford University Press. ISBN 978-0199915156
- Norcross, J. C. (2013). Changeology: 5 steps to realizing your goals and resolutions.Simon & Schuster. ISBN 978-1451657616
