= Cooper Medical School of Rowan University =

Medical school in Camden, New Jersey, US

Coordinates: 39.94073°N 75.11939°W

- Type: Medical school
- Established: 2012
- Parent institution: Rowan University
- Affiliations: Cooper University Health Care
- Dean: Annette Reboli (current)
- Academic staff: 450
- Students: class size 80-112
- Location: Camden, New Jersey, U.S.
- Campus: Urban and Suburban
- Colors: Red and Gold
- Website: cmsru.rowan.edu

Cooper Medical School of Rowan University (CMSRU) is a public medical school located in Camden, New Jersey. It was created as a partnership between Rowan University and Cooper University Hospital in 2009 by executive order of Governor Jon Corzine. CMSRU opened in summer 2012. It is the first medical school to be opened in New Jersey in over 35 years and the only four-year MD-granting institution located in South Jersey.

Rowan University and The Cooper Health System partnered in June 2009 to establish CMSRU to help address the physician shortage locally and nationally and to improve healthcare throughout the region. New Jersey governor and Republican presidential candidate Chris Christie spoke at the school's opening. Its charter class was admitted in May 2012 and a second class matriculated in the fall of 2013. By August 2015, CMSRU had matriculated all four years of students.

== Facilities ==
The Cooper Medical Education Building, a LEED Gold certified building, is located on South Broadway on the Cooper Health Sciences campus. It opened in July 2012 and contains a 260-seat auditorium, a 140-seat multipurpose room, 25 active learning rooms, a clinical simulation center, and a satellite medical library.

== Accreditation ==
Cooper Medical School of Rowan University is fully accredited by the Liaison Committee on Medical Education. Rowan University is accredited by the Commission on Higher Education of the Middle States Association of Colleges and Schools.

== Recognition ==
In November 2019 Cooper Medical School of Rowan University was awarded the Spencer Foreman Award for Outstanding Community Engagement from the American Association of Medical Colleges. The award is given for outstanding service in the community. This service includes CMSRU's service learning program and its pipeline program called Pre-Medical Urban Leaders Summer Enrichment Program (PULSE).

In 2019, Cooper Medical School of Rowan University was voted one of the top ten most difficult medical schools to attain acceptance by incoming medical students in the US.

In April 2019, CMSRU was named in U.S. News’ list of “10 Med Schools With the Lowest Acceptance Rates”
