= Cooper Norcross Health =

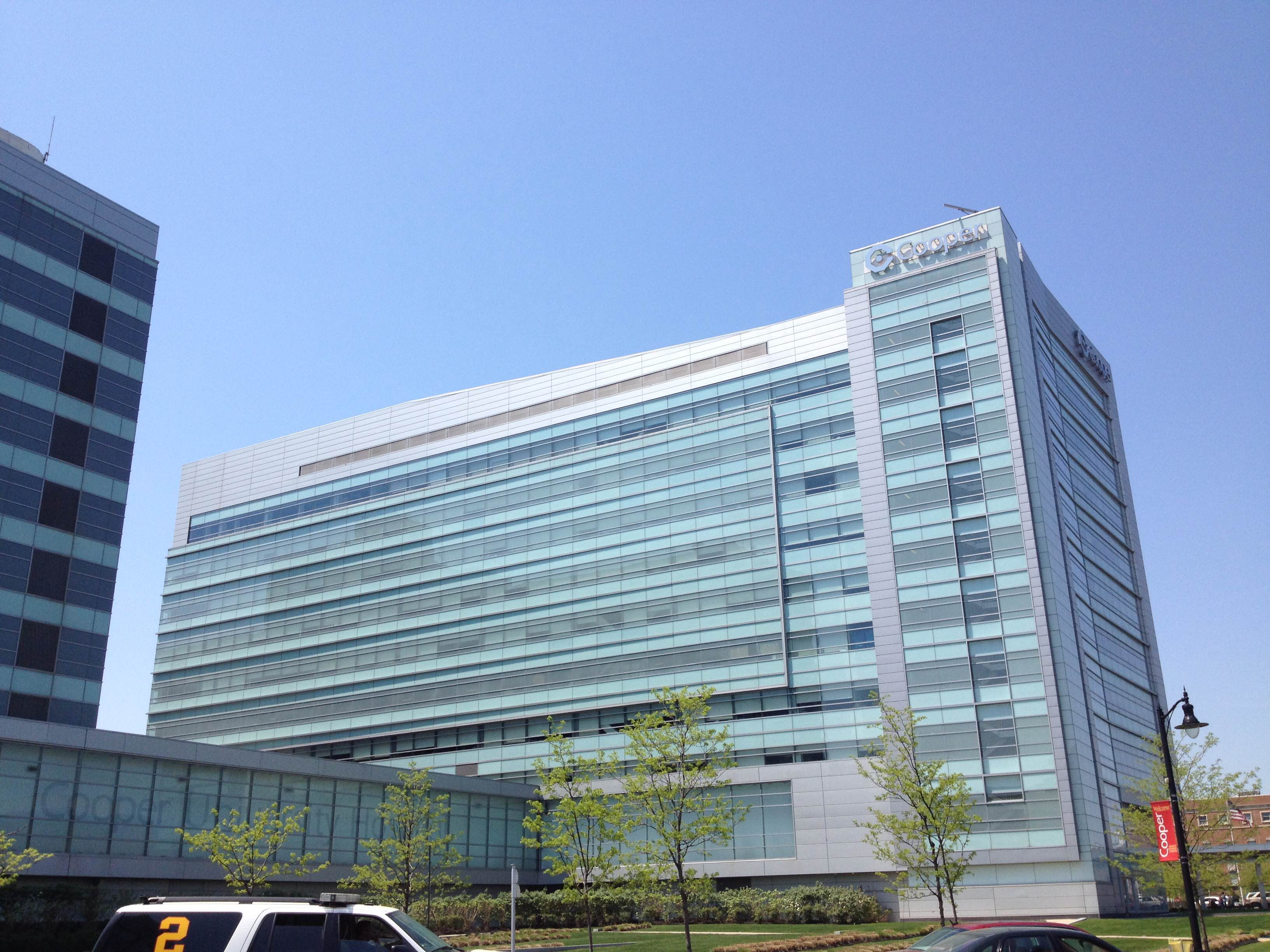
- Main entrance of Cooper Norcross Health in Camden, New Jersey

Geography
- Location: 1 Cooper Plaza, Camden, New Jersey, US
- Coordinates: 39.9416°N 75.1167°W

Organisation
- Type: Teaching
- Affiliated university: Cooper Medical School of Rowan University Robert Wood Johnson Medical School (until 2008)

Services
- Standards: JCAHO
- Emergency department: Level I Adult Trauma Center / Level II Pediatric Trauma Center
- Beds: 663
- Speciality: Interventional cardiology, Neurosurgery, Critical Care

Helipads
- Helipad: FAA LID: NJ17

History
- Founded: 1887; 139 years ago

Links
- Website: http://www.cooperhealth.org

Cooper Norcross Health is a teaching hospital and biomedical research facility located in Camden, New Jersey. The hospital formerly served as a clinical campus of Robert Wood Johnson Medical School and the University of Medicine and Dentistry of New Jersey.

Affiliated with Cooper Medical School of Rowan University, the hospital offers training programs for medical students, medical residents, fellows, nurses, and allied health professions.

In partnership with MD Anderson Cancer Center in Houston, Cooper also operates a comprehensive oncology center serving patients in New Jersey and the Philadelphia metropolitan area.

Cooper is affiliated with the Coriell Institute for Medical Research and is a tertiary partner for 21 regional hospitals in the Delaware Valley.

== History ==
=== 19th century ===
Cooper Norcross Health, formerly Cooper University Hospital, was established in 1887 by the family of Richard M. Cooper, a Quaker physician. The original hospital had 30 beds and provided health care services to the low-income population of Camden, New Jersey. It slowly grew from a small community hospital into a 635-bed regional tertiary care center.

=== 20th century ===
In 1982, it opened a trauma center that remains one of only three state-designated Level I Trauma Centers in New Jersey. It is certified by the American College of Surgeons and serves as the regional trauma center for southern New Jersey counties. It also serves as a resource for Level II Trauma Centers in the South Jersey region. Cooper admits nearly 3000 trauma patients each year, making it the busiest center in New Jersey.

Cooper serves as southern New Jersey's major tertiary-care referral hospital for specialized services and is home to the Bone & Joint Institute, Heart Institute, Neurological Institute and Urological Institute.

=== 21st century ===
==== Expansion ====
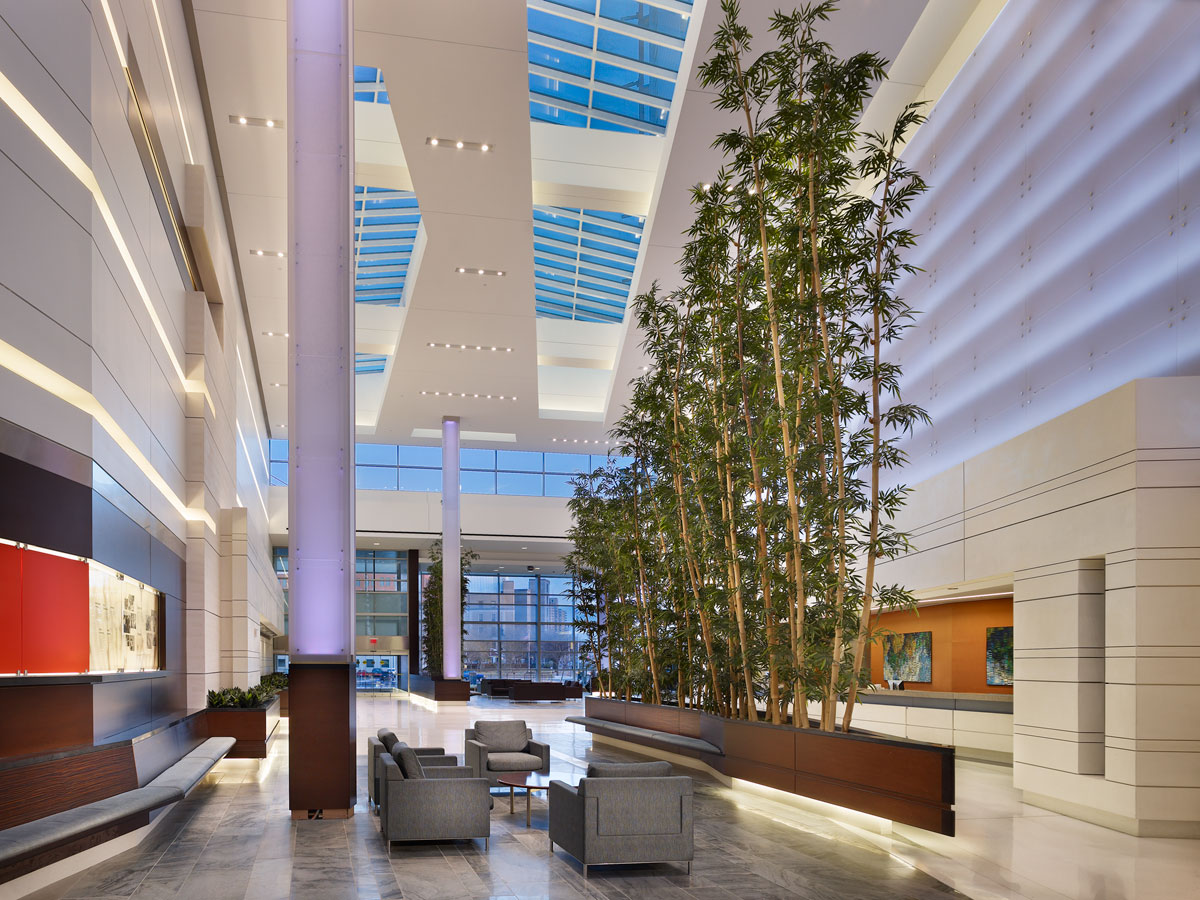
Cooper University Hospital's lobby in 2009

In June 2004, then Cooper University Hospital announced a $220 million expansion to the hospital's Health Sciences Campus that includes a new patient care pavilion attached to the existing facility. Subsequently, plans for the new patient care pavilion were expanded from six floors (211,000 sq ft.) to ten floors (312,000 sq ft.), with the inclusion of additional landscape improvements and patient amenity design features.

Cooper Norcross Health's pavilion project is part of the hospital's efforts to create a regional health science campus in Camden, which will also include a new $130 million Academic and Research Building, as well as a stem cell institute, cancer institute, clinical research building, clinical office building and additional off-street parking.

Designed by EwingCole of Philadelphia, the patient pavilion opened in December 2008 and the hospital's orientation was shifted from Haddon Avenue to Martin Luther King Boulevard, as visitors began entering the hospital through the new lobby and utilizing the Camden County Improvement Authority parking, which connects to the hospital via an enclosed walkway.

The hospital is a planned stop on the Glassboro–Camden Line, an 18-mile (28.97 km) diesel multiple unit (DMU) light rail system projected for completion in 2028, which will connect to the River LINE.

In 2010, the hospital launched the first medical evacuation helicopter service in Cumberland County.

In 2012, the American talk show host Kelly Ripa became an official spokesperson for Cooper.

==== MD Anderson Cancer Center at Cooper ====
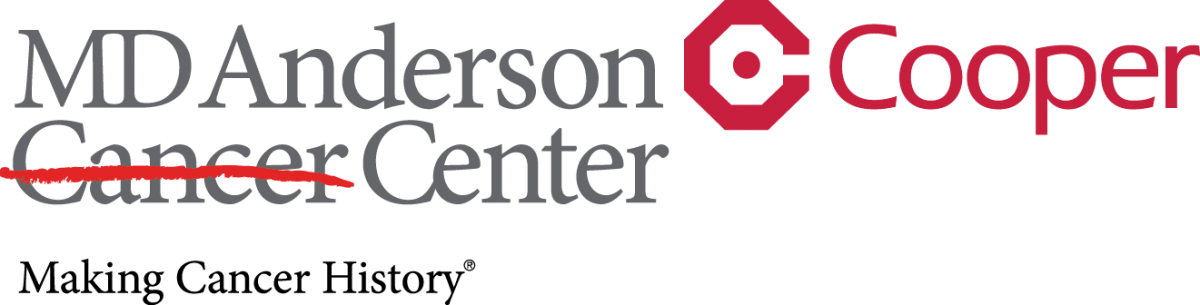
The MD Anderson Cancer Center at Cooper

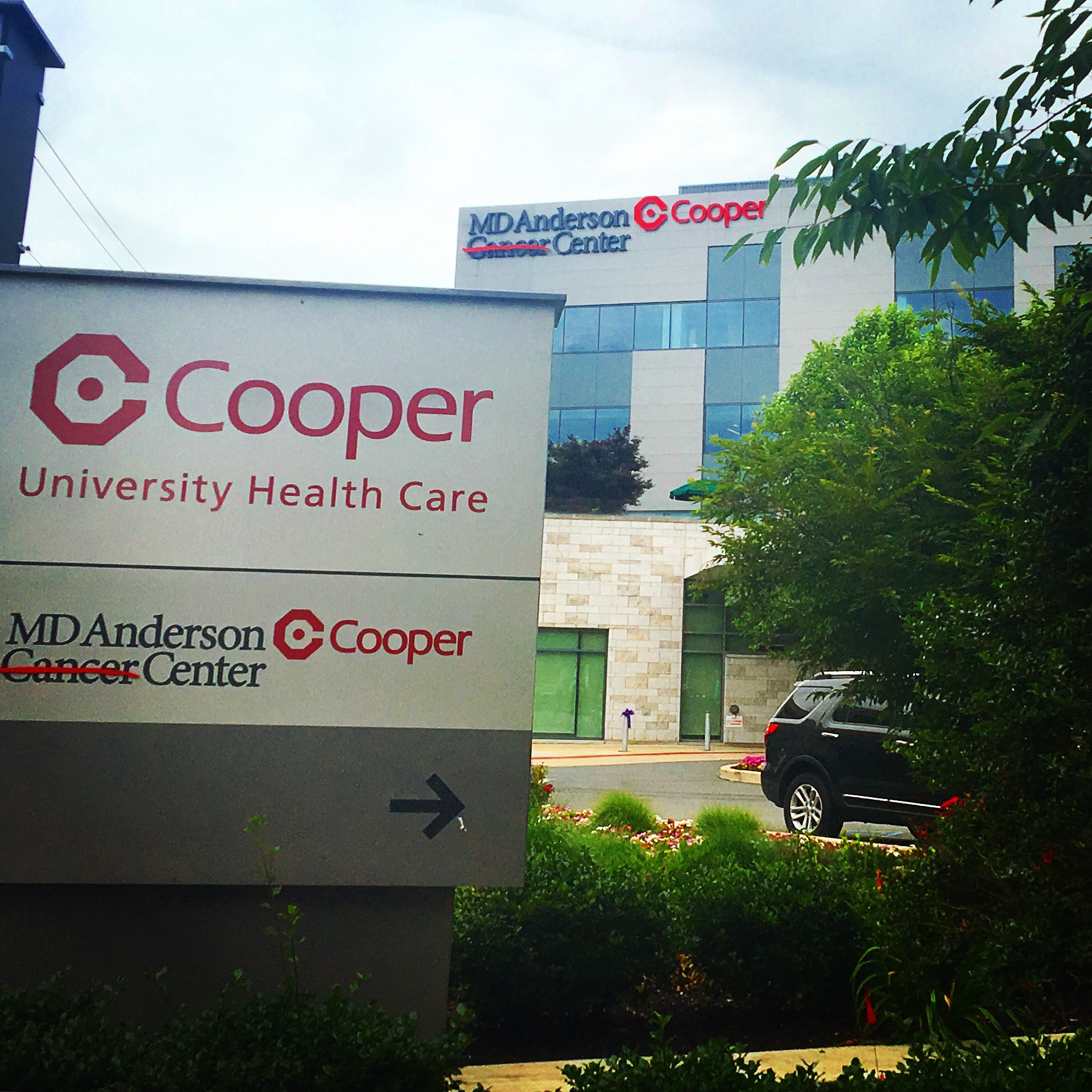
MD Anderson Cancer Center at Cooper

In 2013, George Norcross, a New Jersey native and chairman of the Cooper's board, led the effort to create a new partnership between Cooper University Hospital and MD Anderson Cancer Center in Houston. The two institutions opened a $100 million free-standing facility that houses comprehensive outpatient cancer services, including medical oncology, radiation oncology, surgical oncology, gynecologic oncology, and urology. Other resources include a new pathology laboratory, linear accelerator and PET-CT facility. The center offers patients in the Philadelphia metropolitan area access to MD Anderson's cancer treatment protocols and clinical trials. The MD Anderson Cancer unit at Cooper has 30 inpatient state-of-the-art private rooms on the fifth floor of the Roberts Pavilion.

Cooper University Hospital is one of three co-branded partner institutions of MD Anderson Cancer Center, which include the Banner MD Anderson Cancer Center in Arizona and MD Anderson International in Spain. The MD Anderson Cancer Center at Cooper had over 6,500 new patient visits in 2016. The Leapfrog Group for Pancreatic Surgery ranks MD Anderson Cooper number one in the state of New Jersey for safety in Pancreatic surgery.

As of 2017, Cooper is one of the largest healthcare providers in the Philadelphia and South Jersey region with over 1.2 million outpatient visits annually and over 7,000 employees. The Cooper Institutes and Centers of Excellence include: The Bone and Joint Institute, MD Anderson Cancer Center at Cooper, The Ripa Center for Women's Health and Wellness, The Cooper Heart Institute and Center for Population Health, among many others.

In 2022, a $2 billion expansion of the hospital was announced, which is expected to take about a decade to complete.

In November, 2023, Cooper University Health Care opened a two story campus in the Moorestown Mall in Moorestown, New Jersey at a cost of $150 million.

In September, 2026, the record longest-standing, and 2nd-generation legacy board chairman, and known democratic political power broker George E. Norcross III committed a gift of $100 million dollars towards Cooper's ongoing expansion efforts in honor of his parents, Anne Carole Connor Norcross and former Cooper board chairman George E. Norcross Jr. It was the largest ever recorded philanthropic donation in New Jersey healthcare history, and the largest ever received by Cooper. A move that ultimately led to the decision to rename Cooper University Hospital to Cooper Norcross Health on September 23rd, 2026 in honor of that gift. According to press releases, the donation will be used toward investments in community of Camden, NJ (the location of Cooper Norcross' main hospital) with the intention of creating jobs, increasing education, training, and opportunities.

In 2023, according to their annual report, Cooper University Hospital had:

- Hospital admissions: 31,666
- Surgical cases: 31,773
- Emergency department visits: 80,900
- Transfer volume to Cooper: 6,034
- Outpatient visits: 2,204,331
- Cancer visits, outpatient: 133,024
- Cancer visits, inpatient: 3,071
- Urgent care visits: 59,938
- Trauma cases: 5,037
