= Ascalon (disambiguation) =

Ascalon was an ancient Levantine city known for its prominent role in the Crusades. Destroyed in 1270, its remains are at Tel Ashkelon.

Ascalon can also refer to:

== Places ==
- Ascalon, Ontario, Canada, an unincorporated place and former railway point
- Ascalon, Georgia, United States, an unincorporated community
- Ascalon, Missouri, United States, an unincorporated community

== People ==
- Brad Ascalon (born 1977), American industrial designer
- David Ascalon (born 1975), Israeli artist
- Maurice Ascalon (1913–2003), Israeli designer and sculptor

== Military ==
- ASCALON, a French 140 mm tank gun

== Popular culture ==
- Ascalon, lance or sword used by Saint George to slay the dragon
- Ascalon, British World War II aeroplane used by Winston Churchill, named after the lance—an Avro York
- Ascalon, a place in the computer game Guild Wars, its sequel Guild Wars 2, and 2009 book spin-off Guild Wars: Ghosts of Ascalon

== See also ==
- Ashkelon (disambiguation)
