= Miri Davidovitz =

Israeli photographer

Miri Davidovitz 'מִירי דָּיווידוֹביץ
- Known for: Photography
- Website: Miri Davidovitz

Miri Davidovitz (Hebrew: 'מִירי דָּיווידוֹביץ) is an Israeli photographer.

== Biography ==
Miri Davidovitz was born in Europe. She immigrated in Israel as a child. After studying photography in Jerusalem and London she opened a studio in Tel Aviv. She works as advertising and fashion photographer as well as independent photography teacher. She is mostly known for documenting an Israeli club culture of 80s and early 90s. In 2017 she created a project, depicting refugees from Africa and foreign workers in south Tel Aviv.

== Exhibitions ==
=== Solo ===
- 2015 Brake, Kuli Alma Gallery. Tel Aviv
- 2015 Rock'N' Black, Eretz Israel Museum
- 2013 Mamilla, Eretz Israel Museum
- 2013 UnderCurrents, Artists House, Tel Aviv
- 2011 After Rachel, Bina Gallery, Tel Aviv
- 2010 80's Black & White, Rif Raf, Tel Aviv
- 2008 The Beauty and the beast, Engel Gallery, Tel Aviv
- 1983 The White Gallery, Tel Aviv

=== Group ===
Miri Davidovitz participated in group exhibitions around the world and in Israel, including exhibitions in Israel Museum in Jerusalem, Minshar School of Art Gallery in Tel Aviv, Herzliya Museum of Contemporary Art, Tel Aviv Museum of Art and several public and private galleries.
