= John Kaplan =

John Kaplan may refer to:

- John Kaplan (cantor), American cantor
- John Kaplan (law professor) (1929–1989), legal scholar and law professor
- John Kaplan (photographer), American photographer
- John H. Cox (born John Kaplan), American businessman

== See also ==
- Jon Kaplan (disambiguation)
- Jonathan Kaplan (disambiguation)
