= Congregation Beth El (Bethesda, Maryland) =

Synagogue located in Bethesda, Maryland, US

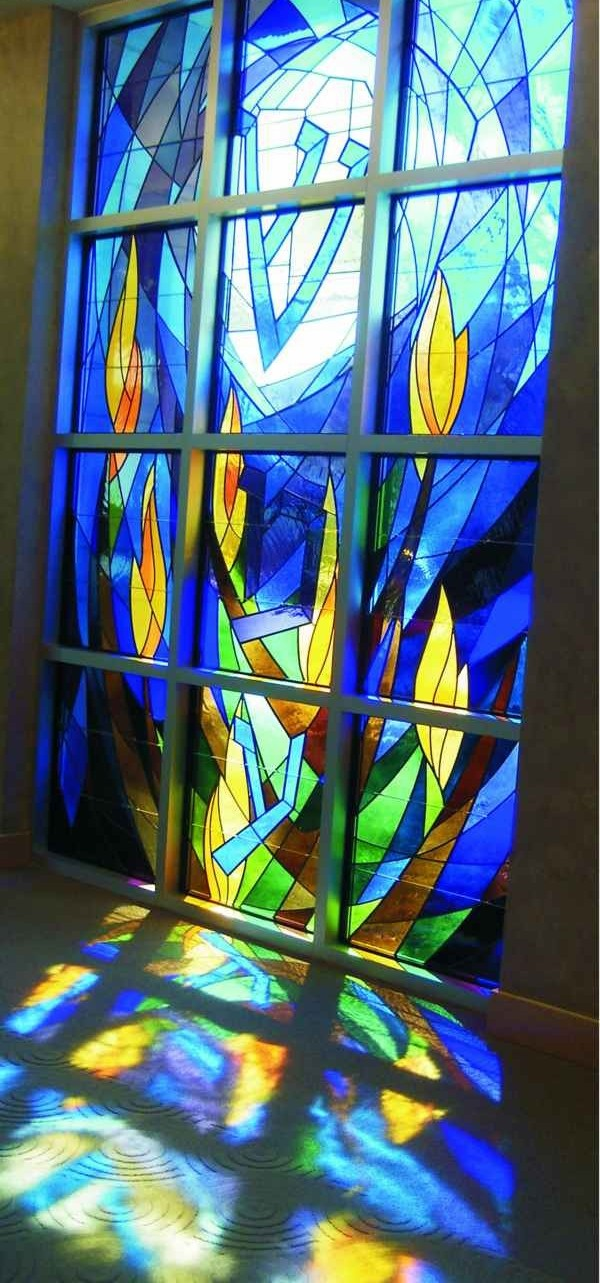
- Stained–glass window by David Ascalon

- Location in Maryland

Religion
- Affiliation: Conservative Judaism
- Ecclesiastical or organisational status: Synagogue
- Leadership: Rabbi Greg Harris; Rabbi Deborah Megdal (Associate); Hazzan Asa Fradkin; Rabbi David Abramson (Adjunct)
- Status: Active
- Notable artwork: David Ascalon stained–glass window; Fishman and Johns tapestries

Location
- Location: 8215 Old Georgetown Road, Bethesda, Montgomery County, Maryland 20814
- Country: United States
- Coordinates: 38°59′34″N 77°06′25″W

Architecture
- Established: 1951 (as a congregation)

Specifications
- Capacity: 1,500 standing (total): 400 seated (sanctuary); 200 seated (chapel)
- Interior area: 60,000 square feet (5,600 m^{2})

Website
- bethelmc.org

Congregation Beth El, officially Congregation Beth El of Montgomery County, is a Conservative Jewish congregation and synagogue, located at 8215 Old Georgetown Road, in Bethesda, Montgomery County, Maryland, in the United States. The K–12 religious school as of January 2024 has approximately 500 students. The congregation's pre-school has approximately 100 students.

The congregation was founded in 1951 with 17 families and by the 1960s had grown to approximately 1,000 families.

As of February 2025, the congregation is led by Rabbi Greg Harris and Rabbi Deborah Megdal, and Asa Fradkin serves as Hazzan. Prior to his passing, Bill Rudolph, Rabbi Emeritus, and Harris and retired Cantor Abraham Lubin were each featured on the PBS television program Religion & Ethics Newsweekly.

== History ==
Congregation Beth El's synagogue building is a modern structure of approximately 60,000 square feet (5,600 m^{2}), situated on Old Georgetown Road. On the bimah of the main sanctuary are two large tapestries, installed in September 1997. Created by member and local artist Tamar Fishman and executed by British weaver Pat Johns, the tapestries are inspired by two narratives from the Book of Genesis that envision episodes in the life of the patriarch Jacob. One tapestry, named Beth El, reflects Genesis 28:10–19, and the other, named Israel, reflects Genesis 32:25–32. The tapestry Beth El was dedicated by former congregation President Walter Arnheim.

Congregation Beth El has received recognition for its award-winning adult education program, the Saul Bendit Institute. Beth El's adult b'nai mitzvah ceremony received special notice in 2010 when 94-year-old Esther Isralow became the oldest of 19 congregants to complete the 18 months of study led by Rabbi Harris that culminated in the service. And Congregation Beth El has held interfaith seminars, such as a 2010 seminar on leadership with perspectives from the Hebrew Bible, the New Testament, and the Koran.

In 2008, Congregation Beth El received a grant from the Pathways Awareness Foundation recognizing its actions to include worshippers of all abilities. In 2009, the United Synagogue of Conservative Judaism gave Beth El an award for the quality of its bulletins.

== Controversy ==
In May 2001 The Washington Post reported that Jonathan Z. Maltzman, Beth El's senior rabbi since c. 1998, had allegedly transferred almost $230,000 from the congregation's charity fund to his personal account; and that of the $400,000 in funds donated, only $20,000 had been directed towards the charity's beneficiairies. Montgomery County officials were invited by the congregation's leaders to investigate the matter. Rabbi Maltzman resigned in July; and, in September, county officials ceased their investigations.

== Notable members ==
- Thomas Friedman, journalist, Pulitzer Prize–winning columnist for The New York Times
- Dennis Ross, a diplomat and author

== See also ==
- History of the Jews in Maryland
