= Temple Israel (Memphis, Tennessee) =

Reform Jewish congregation in Memphis, Tennessee, US

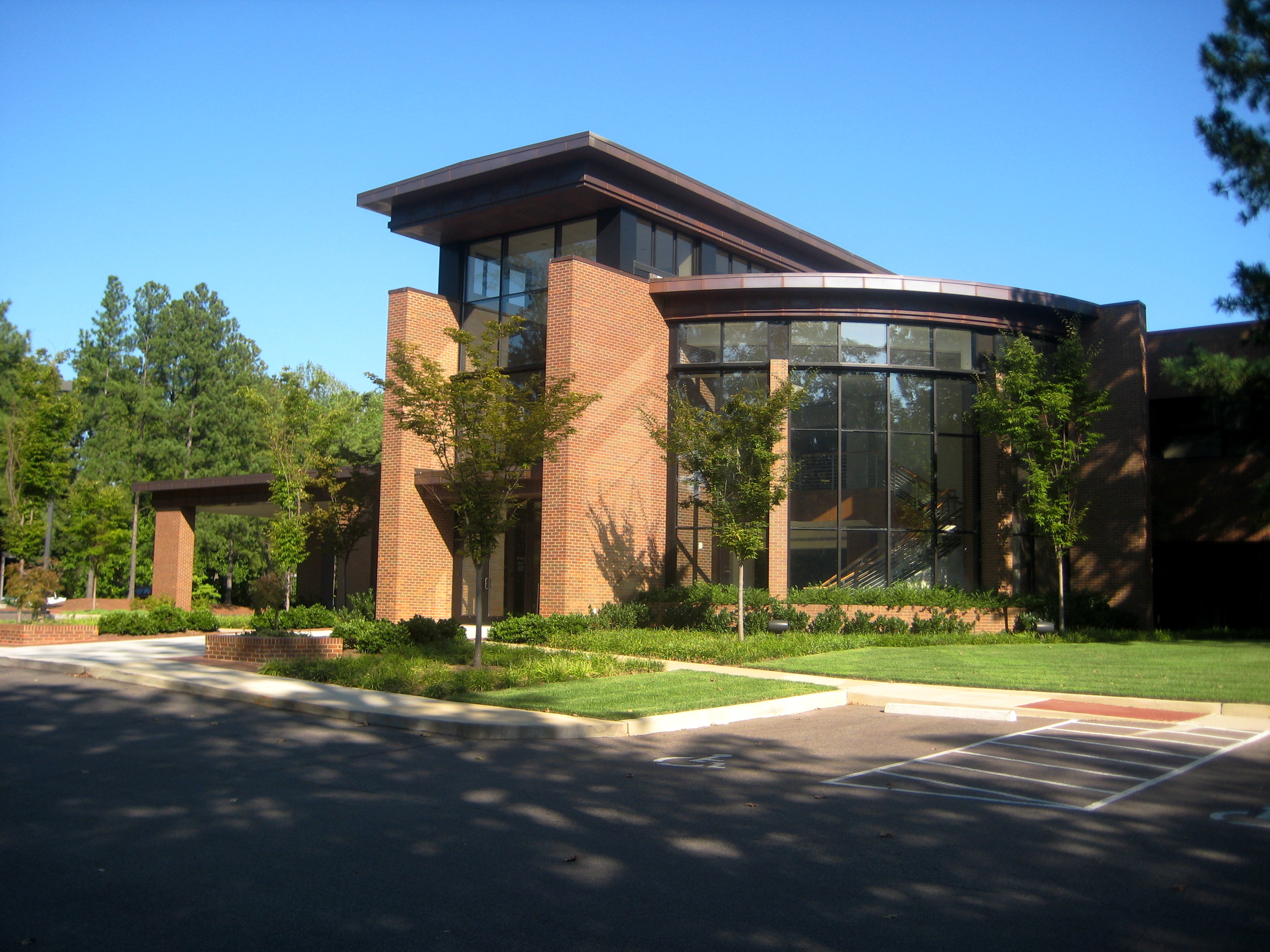
- Temple Israel entrance

- Location in Tennessee

Religion
- Affiliation: Reform Judaism
- Ecclesiastical or organisational status: Synagogue
- Leadership: Rabbi Micah Greenstein; Rabbi Ross Levy (Associate); Rabbi Leah Sternberg (Associate); Rabbi Harry Danziger (Emeritus)
- Status: Active

Location
- Location: 1376 East Massey Road, Memphis, Tennessee
- Country: United States
- Coordinates: 35°06′40″N 89°50′47″W

Architecture
- Architects: Francis Gassner (Gassner, Nathan and Partners); Percival Goodman (consulting)
- Type: Synagogue
- Established: 1853 (as a congregation); 1854 (Chartered by the State)
- Completed: 1860 (Main and Exchange Sts.); 1884 (Poplar Avenue #1); 1917 (Poplar Avenue #2); 1976 (East Massey Road)
- Construction cost: $7 million (today $40 million)

Specifications
- Capacity: Sanctuary: 1,335–1,500; Chapel: 300
- Materials: Steel with masonry; copper roof

Website
- timemphis.org

Temple Israel is a Reform Jewish congregation and synagogue located at 1376 East Massey Road, in Memphis, Tennessee, in the United States. It is the only Reform synagogue in Memphis, the oldest and largest Jewish congregation in Tennessee, and one of the largest Reform congregations in the U.S. It was founded in 1853 by mostly German Jews as Congregation B'nai Israel (Hebrew for "Children of Israel"). Led initially by cantors, in 1858 it hired its first rabbi, Jacob Peres, and leased its first building, which it renovated and eventually purchased.

Peres was fired in 1860 because he opened a store that conducted business on Saturdays, the Jewish Sabbath. He was replaced by Simon Tuska, who moved the congregation from Orthodox to Reform practices. Tuska died in 1871, and was succeeded by Max Samfield; under his leadership, the synagogue was one of the founding members of the Union for Reform Judaism. In 1884, Children of Israel completed a new building, and membership grew rapidly. Samfield died in 1915, and was succeeded by Bill Fineshriber, an outspoken supporter of women's suffrage and equal rights for African Americans. The following year the congregation moved to a new building, where membership continued to grow. Fineshriber left in 1924, and was succeeded by Harry Ettelson.

The synagogue experienced difficulty during the Great Depression—membership dropped, the congregational school was closed, and staff had their salaries reduced—but conditions had improved by the late 1930s. In 1943 the synagogue changed its name to Temple Israel, and by the late 1940s membership had almost doubled from its low point in the 1930s. Ettelson retired in 1954, and was succeeded by Jimmy Wax.

Wax became known for his activism during the Civil Rights Movement. Though some members—particularly those whose families had lived in the South for generations—had segregationist views, others were prominent in the fight for Black civil rights. During Wax's tenure, most of Temple Israel's members moved far from the existing synagogue, and in 1976 the congregation constructed its current building, closer to where most members lived. Wax retired in 1978, and was succeeded by Harry Danziger, who brought traditional practices back to the congregation. He retired in 2000, and was succeeded by Micah Greenstein. As of 2021, Temple Israel has almost 1,450 member families. Greenstein is the Senior Rabbi, and the cantorial soloist is Happie Hoffman.

== Early history (1853–1857) ==
Temple Israel was established as the Orthodox Congregation B'nai Israel in 1853 by 36 heads of families, and granted a charter by the state legislature on March 2, 1854. It grew out of Memphis's Hebrew Benevolent Society, established in 1850 by German Jews. The Benevolent Society managed Memphis's Jewish cemetery, supported poor Jews, and conducted High Holy Day services. The congregation was initially led by part-time cantors. The first was Jonas Levy, who had been hired as cantor and ritual slaughterer. Levy was succeeded by H. Judah and then J. Sternheimer. A Hebrew school was also created, directed by Sternheimer. In 1857, B'nai Israel hired as organist Christopher Philip Winkler, described by Tim Sharp (Dean of Fine Arts at Rhodes College in Memphis) as the "Dean of Memphis Musicians". Born in Germany in 1824, he had emigrated to the United States at age 16, and moved to Memphis in 1854. There he taught music, performed, and composed works for B'nai Israel's services; by 1894 he had completed over 850 pieces for the congregation.

In its first decades, the congregation worshiped in various locations in downtown Memphis, near the Mississippi River waterfront. It received a $2,000 (today $77,000) bequest from the estate of New Orleans philanthropist Judah Touro, and used it to purchase a lot on Second Street, but did not feel financially secure enough to build a synagogue, and eventually sold the property. The congregation instead held services in members' homes in 1853, and subsequently (until 1857) rented various premises on Front Street. The Touro funds eventually enabled the members to lease the Farmers and Merchants Bank building at Main and Exchange streets in late 1857, which they converted to a synagogue. Funds for the renovation were raised by two committees; one solicited donations from "all the Israelites in this city", while the other's task was "to receive subscriptions from Gentiles". Additional funds were raised by selling members reserved seats in the new sanctuary. An auction was held on March 18, 1858, in which 50 men's seats were sold for $343 (today $12,800), and 44 women's seats for $158 (today $5,900). The renovated premises had seating for 150 men and approximately 50 women. In 1860, the congregation contracted to purchase the property; by 1865, it owned it outright and was debt-free. On March 2, 2007, 153 years to the day after the congregation received its charter from the State of Tennessee, a historical marker was erected by the Shelby County Historical Commission, the Jewish American Society for Historic Preservation, and Temple Israel, on the corner where the synagogue had once stood. It described the building as the "First Permanent Jewish House of Worship in Tennessee".

Membership in B'nai Israel was restricted to men, and attendance at the (at least) quarterly meetings was mandatory. Men who missed a meeting without a reasonable excuse were fined. The members also instituted rules intended to guard the image of the small Jewish congregation in the eyes of the much larger Christian community. New members had to be approved by a secret ballot, and existing members could blackball candidates. A member could also be suspended or expelled if he acted in a disreputable manner.

B'nai Israel was the only Jewish congregation in Memphis, and from the time it was established members were split between traditionalists and reformers. When remodeling their new building, the congregation voted eighteen to fourteen to maintain traditional separate seating for men and women. By 1858, with enough funds to hire a full-time spiritual leader, they consulted Rabbi Isaac Leeser, the leader of America's Orthodox Jewish community, but were also in contact with Rabbi Isaac Mayer Wise, the leader of America's fledgling Reform movement, who had dedicated B'nai Israel's sanctuary earlier that year. The members had advertised for their first spiritual leader in Wise's newspaper, The Israelite (along with other English-language Jewish newspapers) at the same time they advertised for a kosher butcher. Leeser recommended Jacob J. Peres, an Orthodox rabbi.

== Peres era (1858–1860) ==
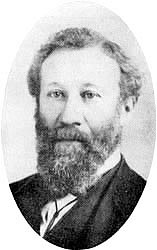
Rabbi Jacob J. Peres

Born and raised in the Netherlands, Peres had been a child prodigy who, before turning eighteen, had edited a Hebrew grammar, as well as a volume of proverbs written in five languages. Upon graduation from high school, he had been given a stipend by William I of the Netherlands to attend the Netherlands Israelitish Seminary, where he pursued both secular and rabbinic studies. He was well-versed in mathematics, language, literature and law, and co-founded Peres and Micou, a legal firm.

B'nai Israel hired Peres in December 1858 as cantor and teacher, in English and German, at an annual salary of $600 (today $22,000) with perquisites of $400. By comparison, the kosher butcher's salary was $300, not including what he earned killing poultry. Peres also ran the Hebrew school and the choir, and was in effect the rabbi. Under his leadership, the membership took a serious interest in the plight of Jews around the world. For example, at a congregational meeting in January 1860, they gathered money from the members present and B'nai Israel's treasury to assist suffering Moroccan Jews, and created a committee to raise funds throughout Memphis on their behalf. The congregation also moved more towards Orthodoxy, and passed a rule stating that only those members who were Sabbath observant could receive Torah honors on the High Holy Days.

Peres did not find his wages sufficient to support himself, his wife, and his four children. To supplement his income, he opened a grocery store and a commission business (selling others' goods on consignment) with his brother. As Saturday (the Jewish Sabbath) was also the busiest day for commerce, he decided to keep his business open on that day—something forbidden by Jewish law, and at odds with the rule he had championed. Some of congregants objected, and at B'nai Israel's April 1860 quarterly meeting, charges were brought against him; at a subsequent trial at a Jewish court, he was convicted and fired. In response, he sued the congregation in a civil court for lost wages and libel. The precedent-setting case, which reached the Tennessee Supreme Court, was decided in his favor as regards the lost income, but against him regarding libel. The court's ruling was that "a religious institution is sovereign; that its laws and regulations are supreme; and that its policies and practices may not be challenged by a legal action in a court of law". In a letter to Rabbi Isaac Leeser in 1862, Peres claimed that he had been framed and that the store was actually run by his brother, just under his name. He writes that the synagogue had accused him of opening on the Sabbath "in order to get rid of me".

After Peres's dismissal, the members began a search for what they called a "Moderate Reform" rabbi. This time, they consulted Wise, not Leeser. The position was advertised in Wise's newspaper as a "Teacher, Preacher, and Reader", paying $1,000 (today $36,000) per year. Qualifications included the ability to "instruct children in Hebrew, lecture once a week in German or English and read the Prayers properly". In 1860, they hired Simon Tuska. Peres stayed in Memphis, and the theological tensions within the congregation were resolved when forty of the more traditional members departed; with Peres as their spiritual leader, they formed the Orthodox Beth El Emeth congregation in the early 1860s. This division process was common to many American congregations of the time.

== Tuska era (1860–1870) ==
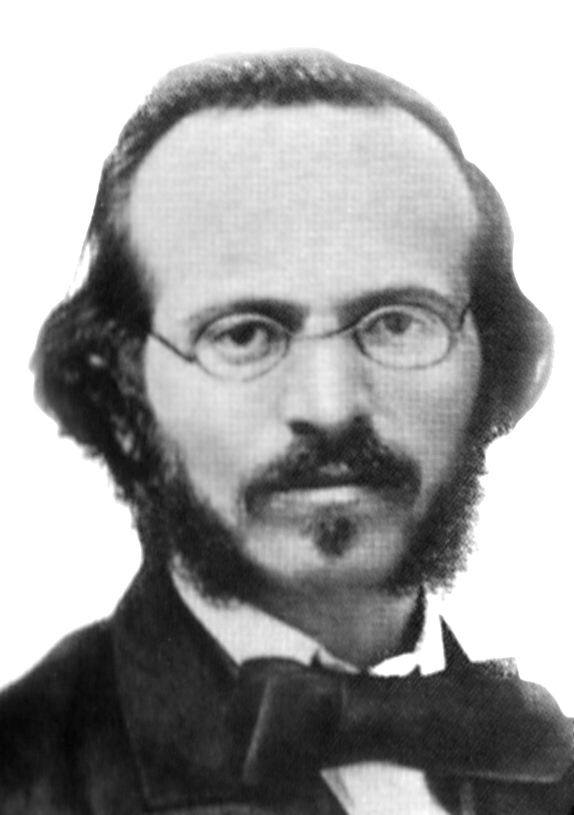
Rabbi Simon Tuska

Born in Veszprém, Hungary in 1835, Tuska was raised in Rochester, New York, where his father was a rabbi. Simon attended the Rochester Theological Seminary, and upon completion of his studies there in 1858, was sent to the Jewish Theological Seminary of Breslau to get rabbinic training. He did not graduate from the seminary, instead returning to the United States in 1860 to apply for a position at Congregation Emanu-El of New York, but he was turned down because of his small size and weak voice. He then applied to Temple Israel, where on July 1, 1860, he was unanimously elected and signed a three-year contract at $800 (today $29,000) per year. He proved to be very popular with the congregation; in January 1863, six months before the three-year contract was up for renewal, he was re-elected as rabbi for a ten-year term, and his salary rose to $1,500 per year.

Tuska reformed services at B'nai Israel, removing piyyutim (liturgical poems) in 1861, adding an organ and mixed-gender choir in 1862, and confirmation ceremonies in 1863. He also shortened the prayer book (adopting Wise's Minhag America version), added a late Friday night service, and created patriotically themed services for Thanksgiving and National Fast Day. When more pews were required to accommodate the worshipers, they were first added to the men's and women's sections, then family pews were added where men and women could sit together. In May 1864, as rabbi of B'nai Israel, he officiated at what may have been the first Jewish wedding in Tennessee; until that year, Tennessee did not authorize rabbis to perform marriages. He was also involved in the broader Memphis community, and participated in interfaith services.

Tuska supported slavery, describing the abolitionist views of Henry Ward Beecher and others as "rabid", and like most members of B'nai Israel, after hostilities broke out between the Union and the Confederacy, he supported secession from the Union. More than ten members of the congregation volunteered for the Confederate Army after war broke out, and they were given special honors and blessings at a ceremony during Sabbath services. Many Memphis schools were forced to close because of the Civil War; in response, B'nai Israel established the Hebrew Educational Institute in 1864. A secular school, it had 100 students, and taught English, Hebrew, German, and French as well as geography and music. Tuska was one of the school's language teachers. Insufficient funding forced its closure in 1868.

B'nai Israel had 83 members in 1864. The mortgage on the synagogue building had been paid off by 1865, but by 1867 the synagogue's expenses were exceeding its income. Dues were raised to $4 (today $90) per member per month, and the congregation took out a new mortgage. In January 1870, the congregation moved Friday night services to 7:30 p.m.; previously the services had been held just after sunset, in accordance with Jewish law, which had meant late-night services in mid-summer, and late-afternoon services in mid-winter. (Several years later High Holy Day services were moved to the same time). That year Tuska began giving his Friday night sermons in English, rather than German. At the end of 1870, Tuska died of a heart attack.

== Samfield era (1871–1915) ==
In 1871, the congregation, whose membership by this time had reached 100, elected Max Samfield to succeed Tuska. The son of a rabbi, he was born in 1846 in Marktsteft, Bavaria, and was ordained in Germany. He left for the United States in 1867 to be rabbi of B'nai Zion Congregation of Shreveport, Louisiana, where he served for four years. He had significant competition for the role at B'nai Israel, with at least ten rabbis applying. Samfield had, however, preached there the Sabbath before the election for rabbi, and was hired for a one-year term. A strong proponent of Reform Judaism, he was associated with Wise in founding the Union of American Hebrew Congregations (now Union for Reform Judaism), and under his leadership, B'nai Israel became one of its founding members in 1873. He was also president of the Board of Governors of Hebrew Union College (HUC) in Cincinnati, Ohio, and was supervisor of the Central Conference of American Rabbis. In 1875, he asked the congregation if he could abandon wearing the traditional head covering while leading the prayers; in response, the members resolved that all men would be required to remove their hats during services. He led the congregation to adopt the Reform movement's new Union Prayer Book in 1896, but resisted moving Sabbath services to Sunday. Like most Reform rabbis at that time, he was strongly anti-Zionist, writing that Zionism was "an abnormal eruption of perverted sentiment".

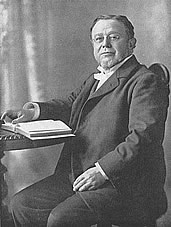
Rabbi Max Samfield

A Scottish Mason, Samfield was committed to public service. When Tennessee's first Society for the Prevention of Cruelty to Animals and Children was formed in 1880, he became its first vice-president, and in 1889, he led the fundraising for Memphis's first civilian hospital, St. Joseph's, a Catholic institution. He founded Memphis's Hebrew Relief Association, and the non-sectarian United Charities, and was a director of the New Orleans Jewish Orphans' Home, Denver's Jewish Consumptive House, and New York's Sheltering House Association. For the last fifteen years of his life he worked to create a home for elderly and infirm Southern Jews, completed in 1927.

During Memphis's 1873 yellow fever epidemic, he—along with other Memphis rabbis and leading Jews—remained in the city rather than fleeing. During the seven weeks the epidemic lasted, 51 people were buried in B'nai Israel's cemetery, almost twice the number typically buried there in a whole year. When another yellow fever epidemic broke out in 1878, Samfield stayed again, ministering to the dead and dying of all faiths. During that epidemic 78 people were buried in the congregation's cemetery. The city's frequent yellow fever epidemics decimated its Jewish community, which dropped from 2,100 to 300. They also hurt B'nai Israel's finances; members did not pay their dues, and for a time the congregation could not afford to pay Samfield. By 1880, however, membership had increased to 124 families, and finances had improved. By this time, the synagogue was more typically called Children of Israel. Beth El Emeth was affected more severely than Children of Israel by the epidemics; its rabbi (Peres) died of yellow fever in 1879. In 1882, Beth El Emeth disbanded, and transferred its property to Children of Israel, though most Beth El Emeth members joined the Orthodox Baron Hirsch Synagogue. The property included land on Second Street, and Beth El Emeth's cemetery.

In 1872, Children of Israel purchased land on Adams Avenue, with the intent of building a new synagogue there, but financial pressures delayed the project, and in 1880 the congregation decided to sell the property and find a better one. They sold the lot in 1882, and instead purchased land on Poplar Avenue between Second and Third Streets. By 1884, they had completed a new synagogue building there, at a cost of $39,130 (today $1,402,000). The Byzantine Revival structure had an impressive façade featuring twin tall spires and a large round window containing a Star of David. The building helped attract new members; by 1885 an additional 45 had joined, for a total of 173 member families, and the congregation was again debt-free. That year, the synagogue acquired a cemetery on Hernando Road.

Though the congregation continued to grow, most new Jewish immigrants to Memphis were from Eastern Europe, and more traditional than the members of Children of Israel. As a result, they typically formed their own Orthodox synagogues, the oldest and longest-lasting of which was the Baron Hirsch Synagogue. Members of Children of Israel worked to assist the Eastern European Jews in assimilating into American society, providing financial assistance, free education on topics such as English, civics, and even hygiene, and from 1897 to 1907 they held a Sunday School for children of the Baron Hirsch congregation. In 1890, the membership of Children of Israel was 186 families, and the religious school had 148 students. To deal with persistent financial issues and attract younger members, in 1897 the congregation created a new class of member, the "seatholder", who could not be elected to any office, but paid less in return. This innovation was successful; 47 new members joined in 1898, and the congregation's total membership reached 222 families. Combined with cost cuts in other areas (primarily reducing the amount paid to the choir), this pulled the synagogue out of a four-year financial deficit.

At the end of the nineteenth century, the synagogue's annual revenues were $7,500 (today $290,000). Around this time the congregation stopped hiring cantors, relying instead on the organist and choir to lead prayer-singing. By 1905, congregational membership had increased to 262, and by 1907 it was 285, and the synagogue's annual revenues were $8,500. The congregational school, which held classes once a week, had fifteen teachers and 220 students. That year the congregation added 56 seats to the sanctuary, primarily to handle the increased attendance on the High Holy Days. Despite the congregation's growth and the expansion of the sanctuary, attendance at regular services was sparse, particularly on Friday nights. From 1892 onward, Samfield publicly admonished the members for their poor Sabbath attendance, and in 1907, he insisted that board members attend Friday night services. The board agreed on condition that Samfield ensured his sermons were no longer than 25 minutes. Notwithstanding these issues, in 1904 Children of Israel purchased him a house, and in 1910 voted him "rabbi for life", at an annual salary of $4,200 (today $145,000). That year membership reached 305 families. In September 1911, William H. "Bill" Fineshriber became the congregation's first associate rabbi. By 1912, the congregation had again grown too large for its building. Family membership was now 340, and the religious school had 260 children enrolled. The congregation acquired land on Poplar Avenue at Montgomery Street, 2 miles (3.2 km) east of their existing location, and began constructing a new synagogue there.

In addition to his other activities, in 1885 Samfield founded The Jewish Spectator, a weekly journal on Southern Jewish life and culture. He was its editor until his death in September 1915, just days before his planned retirement. His death was announced with banner headlines, and to commemorate his passing, Memphis's streetcars were stopped for ten minutes.

== Fineshriber era (1915–1924) ==
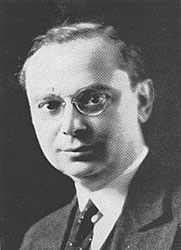
Rabbi William Fineshriber

Fineshriber succeeded Samfield in 1915. Born in St. Louis, Missouri, in 1878, his father had been a Reform rabbi, who died at the age of 37. When Fineshriber was 13, he moved to Cincinnati on his own, where he attended high school. After graduating, he attended the University of Cincinnati and entered HUC's eight-year program. By 1900 he had graduated from both and been ordained. He accepted his first pulpit that year at Temple Emanuel in Davenport, Iowa, and joined Children of Israel in 1911 as associate rabbi. He was the synagogue's first HUC graduate, and its first American-born rabbi. He had a quick wit, and was able to speak eloquently and extemporaneously on almost any topic. Often quoted in the newspapers, he was active in the Memphis community, and was a Rotarian, Shriner, and Freemason. He was also an early suffragist, and took up the cause at Children of Israel. At a 1913 women's day event, featuring speakers from Louisiana, Arkansas, Mississippi and Tennessee, he was the only male speaker. At a 1914 rally he stated "Taxation without representation is tyranny ... [The] purpose of this meeting ... is to shock the people of Memphis into a realization that the question of equal suffrage is not child's play."

He spoke out strongly against the lynching of Ell Persons in 1917. Persons, a black man accused of raping and decapitating a sixteen-year-old white girl, had been burned alive in front of a crowd of thousands in Memphis, and his remains dismembered, scattered, and displayed. Fineshriber called a congregational meeting to protest the lynching, convinced the membership to endorse a public condemnation of it, and acted as secretary to a group of clergymen who issued a statement decrying the practice. He also convinced the editor of Memphis's largest newspaper, The Commercial Appeal, to write an editorial criticizing the lynching. Fineshriber supported other causes affecting African-Americans; he worked to improve their housing, spoke at black churches, and helped raise funds for them. He criticized the Ku Klux Klan from his pulpit, the only clergyman in Memphis to do so. In 1921 he publicized his intention to "preach on the Ku Klux Klan" at Children of Israel at an event that, it was hoped, would attract many non-members. The Klan had re-organized in Memphis that year, and less than a month after Fineshriber's speech, marched publicly in Nashville's Armistice Day parade. Despite threats against him, his wife, and children, Fineshriber continued to preach against the Klan at the temple and other venues.

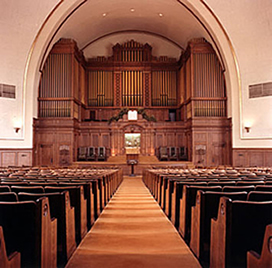
Sanctuary, Poplar and Montgomery building

In 1922, in response to the attempt by William Jennings Bryan and his followers to ban the teaching of evolution in universities and public schools, Fineshriber devoted three Friday night sermons to discussing it. He emphasized to packed audiences the "inalienable right of free thought and free speech, guaranteed by the Constitution of the United States", and argued that "[t]he majority of thoughtful and liberal preachers of the world have found no difficulty in accepting the theory of evolution without discarding their Bibles or their religion. You can worship God only in the light of truth". Nevertheless, in 1925 Tennessee became the first state to ban the teaching of evolution in public schools, a law not repealed until 1967.

During Fineshriber's early years the congregation continued to modify its religious practices. At funerals, it encouraged mourners to leave the graveside, rather than having them wait until the coffin was lowered and cover it with earth themselves (as was the traditional practice). By this time, few members had bar mitzvah ceremonies for their 13-year-old boys; instead, boys and girls participated in the Reform confirmation ceremony (though the synagogue still allowed those who wanted bar mitzvah ceremonies to have them). In 1916, the congregation eliminated the observance of the eighth days of Passover and Sukkot, required all worshipers to stand when mourners stood to recite the kaddish, and restored the Orthodox practice of blessing and naming babies in the synagogue as part of the services.

Children of Israel dedicated its new synagogue building in 1916. Designed by local architects Walk C. Jones, Sr. and Max Furbringer, it featured a large central dome and two smaller flanking domes, and was designed to resemble Istanbul's Hagia Sophia. Entrance was through three sets of double-doors, and carved into the entablature was the biblical verse fragment "THOU SHALT LOVE THY NEIGHBOR AS THYSELF" (Leviticus 19:18). The building's sanctuary seated 1,200, and had a huge $10,000 (today $300,000) organ. The money for the latter had been raised by the recently formed Ladies Auxiliary, whose most effective fund-raising activity involved selling home-cooked meals. The building also had an auditorium with a stage, and fourteen classrooms for the religious school. Children of Israel's vacated building was purchased by a new Orthodox congregation that had adopted the name of the disbanded Beth El Emeth.

After the United States entered World War I in 1917, 131 men from Children of Israel enlisted or were drafted; one was killed. By 1919, the congregation's family membership had reached 450, and the synagogue's annual revenues were $18,000 (today $330,000). The congregational school, which still held classes once a week, had 14 teachers and 388 students. The following year, women were given the right to vote at all congregational meetings. Fineshriber left in 1924 to become head rabbi of Congregation Keneseth Israel in Philadelphia. During his tenure, Children of Israel's membership doubled, and the religious school grew from 100 to 550 students. He died in 1968, and is the congregation's only deceased senior rabbi not buried in its cemetery.

== Ettelson era (1925–1954) ==
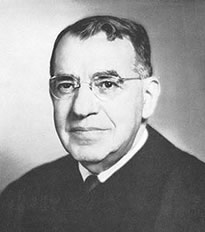
Rabbi Harry Ettelson

Harry William Ettelson succeeded Fineshriber in 1925, the first Southerner to lead the congregation. Born in 1883, he was raised in Mobile, Alabama. He had a B.A. from the University of Cincinnati (graduating in 1900 when he was seventeen), an M.A. from the University of Chicago, and a Ph.D. from Yale University. Ordained at HUC in 1904, he first served Congregation Achduth Vesholom in Fort Wayne, Indiana, from 1904 to 1910, then Congregation Beth Israel of Hartford, Connecticut, from 1911 to 1919. From 1919 to 1925 he was associate rabbi, then head rabbi at Congregation Rodeph Shalom in Philadelphia.

Ettelson was a strong supporter of the Pittsburgh Platform and its principles, which became the basis for what was later known as "classical" Reform Judaism. The services he led reflected that: member participation in the services (which were mostly in English) was limited. While at Achduth Vesholom he moved services from Saturday to Sunday for a period, in an attempt to improve attendance. Even before his joining Children of Israel, the congregation had already substantially reformed its services; it no longer held bar mitzvahs, observed the laws of kashrut, or allowed congregants to participate in the Torah reading. Aside from the Shema Yisrael and Kaddish, Hebrew or Aramaic prayers had been almost totally eliminated. Though he made few ritual changes himself, Ettelson continued this tradition, and emphasized community service over ritual practice, promoting Judaism as a universalist religion with a mission of justice and peace. The year he arrived he organized the Cross Cut Club, an inter-faith group intended to counter religious prejudice. He served as its first president, and was its president again in 1950. One of his initiatives there was the Union Civic Thanksgiving Service, an interdenominational eve-of-Thanksgiving service that was held for a number of years. In the 1930s it held an integrated meeting, and, as a result, was not invited back to the venue the following year.

When Ettelson joined the congregation, it had 650 member families. To accommodate growth, in 1926 the synagogue built an annex for the children's religious school. That year the congregation also established the "Temple Men's Club", which had over 200 members, and joined the National Federation of Temple Brotherhoods. In 1928, the congregation purchased an adjoining house south of the synagogue, for Junior Congregation meetings, and began broadcasting its Friday evening services on the radio. The costs for both endeavors were donated anonymously by synagogue member Abe Plough, founder and chairman of Schering-Plough. The synagogue was hard-hit by the Great Depression. Income from dues dropped from $47,000 in 1928 (today $880,000) to $23,000 in 1932, and membership fell from 750 families in 1929 to as low as 629 families. The Talmud Torah was closed due to lack of funds, and board meetings focused on finding ways to keep the congregation going financially. Ettelson requested a pay reduction of $1,000 (today $21,000) in 1931, and a further 10 percent cut in 1933, and the salaries of other synagogue employees were also cut. The Junior Congregation did well, though; it had 189 paid members by 1933, held Saturday morning and High Holy Days services, and conducted a number of other programs. The congregation eventually recovered as a whole, assisted by members who were leaders in the civic and business worlds. By 1936, membership had increased to 650, and the synagogue paid off the remaining mortgage on the Poplar and Montgomery synagogue building.

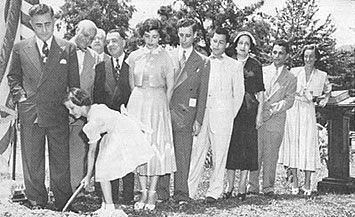
Religious school groundbreaking, 1950

In 1932, Ettelson became locally famous for a debate he had at Nashville's Ellis Auditorium with Scopes Trial lawyer Clarence Darrow on whether or not religion was necessary. Ettelson argued in favor, Darrow against. Friction between Ettelson and some board members came to a head in 1937, when the board discussed the issue of whether to retain him as rabbi; when invited to the meeting, he spoke briefly, then resigned. The board recommended that his tenure be put to a congregational vote at the next annual meeting, where he was re-elected in a secret ballot by a vote of 303 to 31. He took an eight-month medical leave in 1938, and Children of Israel hired Morton Cohn as assistant rabbi.

The congregation was heavily involved in World War II, with many members serving in the armed forces, including Dudley Weinberg, who had succeeded Cohn as assistant rabbi. Children of Israel published a special newsletter for overseas members; by the end of the war, approximately four hundred congregants had served—and fourteen had died—in the U.S. military. As with many other Reform congregations, the members of Temple Israel were split on the issue of Zionism. It is likely that a majority were anti-Zionist, and the synagogue president joined the anti-Zionist American Council for Judaism, though other prominent members supported Zionism, and still others were simply non-Zionist. Ettelson initially opposed Zionism, though he did not join the council. With the growth of antisemitism inside and outside the United States, his views changed, and he was an early member of the local chapter of the Zionist United Palestine Appeal. Nevertheless, he successfully kept the issue from becoming divisive at the temple.

In 1943, the congregation changed its name to Temple Israel. Its membership grew rapidly, from 914 families in 1944 to over 1,100 by late 1949, together with an increase in the number of children in line with the post-war post–World War II baby boom. In 1951 the temple added a new education building, which had 22 classrooms, offices, and a library. That year the congregation also updated the synagogue's kitchen, added air conditioning for the vestry and auditorium, and the same for the sanctuary in 1953. Ettelson retired the following year, and was succeeded as senior rabbi by James Wax.

== Wax era (1954–1978) ==
Born in 1912, James Aaron "Jimmy" Wax was raised in Herculaneum, Missouri, where his was usually the only Jewish family in town. While attending Washington University in St. Louis, he was inspired by Rabbi Ferdinand Isserman of Temple Israel of St. Louis to become a rabbi, as a means of achieving social justice. Because of financial constraints brought on by the Depression, Wax had to finish his undergraduate schooling at Southeast Missouri State Teachers College, where he graduated with a B.A. in 1935. Mentored by Isserman, he then applied to HUC. Because he had little background in Hebrew, he did intensive work in the language prior to and during his admission, and was eventually ordained and achieved a Master of Hebrew Letters degree there in 1941. Turned down as a U.S. military chaplain, from 1941 to 1945 he served at United Hebrew Congregation in St. Louis, and at North Shore Congregation Israel in Glencoe, Illinois. In 1946, he became assistant rabbi of Temple Israel, and in 1947 was promoted to associate rabbi. In the early 1950s he was twice elected president of the Memphis and Shelby County Mental Health Society. Upon Ettelson's retirement in 1954, Wax became senior rabbi.

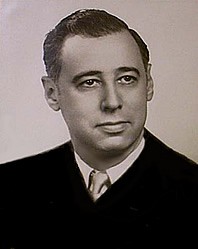
Rabbi James Wax

By this time the synagogue had around 1,200 member families, and over 600 children in its religious school. Wax initiated some changes in the congregation's religious practices. One was to have a real ram's horn shofar blown on Rosh Hashanah starting in 1954, rather than the trumpet that had been used for a number of years. Under his leadership a number of members also started having bar mitzvah ceremonies for their children, though this did not become common until the 1970s. By the 1970s he had also added Hebrew classes to the religious school.

In 1955 he supported and raised funds for the creation of Memphis's first Conservative synagogue, Beth Sholom, so that Conservative Jews would have their own place to worship. By 1964, four assistant rabbis had succeeded Wax; Milton G. Miller, Robert Blinder, Sandford Seltzer, and Sylvin Wolf. That year Wax added Torah readings to the Friday evening service, and Temple Israel's board began purchasing State of Israel Bonds; in the wake of the 1967 Six-Day War, the board resolved to buy Israel Bonds "to the maximum feasible extent". By 1970 Wax had introduced services to celebrate Yom Ha'atzmaut and commemorate Holocaust Remembrance Day. Though he initially resisted the idea of having a cantor, he eventually accepted a limited role for one, and in 1971 Thomas Schwartz was hired as Temple Israel's first full-time cantor/musical director in 80 years. Schwartz's salary was not paid by the synagogue, but was instead paid privately by a group of its members. In 1978, Wax received the National Human Relations Award from the Memphis Round Table of the National Conference of Christians and Jews. He retired a few weeks later, though he served as acting rabbi of Temple Beth El in Helena, Arkansas, visiting regularly from 1978 until his death in 1989.

=== Civil rights activism ===
The Civil Rights Movement sparked extremist antisemitism in the South, and "Communist Jews" were blamed for destroying democracy following the United States Supreme Court's decision in Brown v. Board of Education. Southern Jews found themselves in a difficult position; they were a vulnerable minority whose status in Southern white society was marginal and conditional on their acceptance of the status quo. Because of these concerns, particularly after the 1958 bombing of the Hebrew Benevolent Congregation Temple in Atlanta, the congregation did not want Wax taking a public stand on civil rights. In addition, though Wax supported racial integration, not all his congregants did; according to Wax, "Almost all native-born Southerners whose families lived in the South for two or more generations have segregationist attitudes." Rather than getting involved in public protests, Wax worked with groups supporting integration, such as the Memphis Ministers Association. He also encouraged Temple Israel's members to join groups like the Panel of American Women, an interfaith and inter-racial group that spoke in favor of religious and racial tolerance at community events and whose Memphis chapter was founded by congregation member Jocelyn Wurzburg. Temple Israel member Myra Dreifus co-founded Memphis's Fund for Needy Schoolchildren in the 1960s. It helped provide food for hungry schoolchildren, primarily in black schools, and later expanded its efforts to include the distribution of free or discounted clothing and footwear. The group had both white and black women as members, including members of Temple Israel, and because of Dreifus's role in the Fund, Temple Israel itself supported it. By 1968, members of the Sisterhood were donating money so that tutors could be bussed to the majority African-American Kansas Street School. According to professor of women's and gender studies Kimberly K. Little, this "marked the first occasion where Temple Israel opened its doors to community–based programs; its prior charitable work focused on Jewish community outreach".

Wax was particularly involved with Memphis Committee on Community Relations (MCCR). The MCCR was formed in 1958 by a group of Memphis city leaders, with a goal of ending segregation in a non-violent way. Individual committees worked to desegregate various public facilities in Memphis. The MCCR also worked to get blacks representation in government (both elected and appointed officials), and created programs to improve economic conditions and job opportunities for blacks. Wax served as the MCCR's secretary from its formation until its dissolution in the 1970s. Several other Temple Israel members worked with the MCCR, and, as owners of large Memphis companies, were able to implement desegregation in their own workplaces. Other Temple Israel members supported the civil rights movement: senior business executives convinced stores to hire black salespeople, Herschel Feibelman chaired the Memphis War on Poverty Committee, and Marvin Ratner left a partnership at a prominent local law firm to form, along with two white and two black lawyers, Memphis's first integrated law firm.

In January 1965, Memphis mayor William B. Ingram asked Wax to join his Community Action Committee, a group that tried to get federal funding for anti-poverty programs and job training for black youths. In August of that year, Wax became chair of its policy committee, a mostly black group. Though the committee created a number of helpful programs, disagreement over the mayor's role in choosing members and controlling funds led to the group's dissolution in January 1966. Ingram lauded Wax's efforts on behalf of the group. Wax was also active in other civil rights groups, including the Tennessee Council on Human Relations, the American Civil Liberties Union, the Memphis Urban League, and the Program of Progress, a group that worked to reform local government. He was elected president of the Memphis Ministers Association in May 1967, even though he was its only Jewish member.

On January 31, 1968, two Memphis sanitation workers were crushed to death in a malfunctioning garbage compactor, prompting the start of the Memphis sanitation strike on February 12. The mostly black sanitation workers were Memphis's lowest paid civil servants, and received no overtime or holiday pay. Memphis's mayor was now Henry Loeb, a former member of Temple Israel, who converted to Christianity soon after starting his term in 1968, after marrying an Episcopalian woman. He refused to negotiate with the workers, and the strike soon came to national attention as a civil rights issue. After being contacted by black ministers, Wax arranged a meeting on February 18 between Loeb, local union leaders, and Jerry Wurf, head of the American Federation of State, County and Municipal Employees. The talks, which continued until 5:00 am on the 19th, and resumed later that day, resolved nothing. Temple Israel member Dreifus used her past support for Loeb in his 1967 mayoralty campaign as a means of trying to force him to resolve the strike, and act as a representative of both white and black Memphians. The strike continued through March. In an attempt to defuse tension, Wax called a meeting of Memphis's two clergy groups, the mostly white Memphis Ministers Association and the black Interdenominational Alliance for April 3. The meeting, if anything, had the opposite effect; the black ministers wanted to march immediately on the mayor's office, while most of the white clergy, including Wax, refused to join the march, which they argued would just inflame the white public.

Martin Luther King Jr. was assassinated in Memphis the next night. The Memphis Ministers Association organized a memorial service for King on the 5th. At the service, the ministers voted to march to Loeb's office that day and insist he address the workers' grievances and end the strike; led by Wax and William Dimmick, the dean of St. Mary's Cathedral, 250 clergymen marched in pairs to Loeb's office, where he was urged in front of television cameras to end the strike. In his sermon at Temple Israel, Wax told the congregation: "This city shall witness a new spirit and the memory of this great prophet of our time shall be honored. There will be bigots and segregationists and the so-called respectable but unrighteous people who will resist. But in the scheme of history, God's will does prevail." The strike was settled on April 16, with the sanitation workers getting union recognition and other benefits. The only remaining impediment was a recommended ten-cent-an-hour raise on May 1, followed by another raise on September 1. The city budget did not have the estimated $558,000 (today $5.2 million) required to pay the workers. To resolve the impasse, Temple Israel member Abe Plough donated the shortfall anonymously.

=== East Massey Road building ===
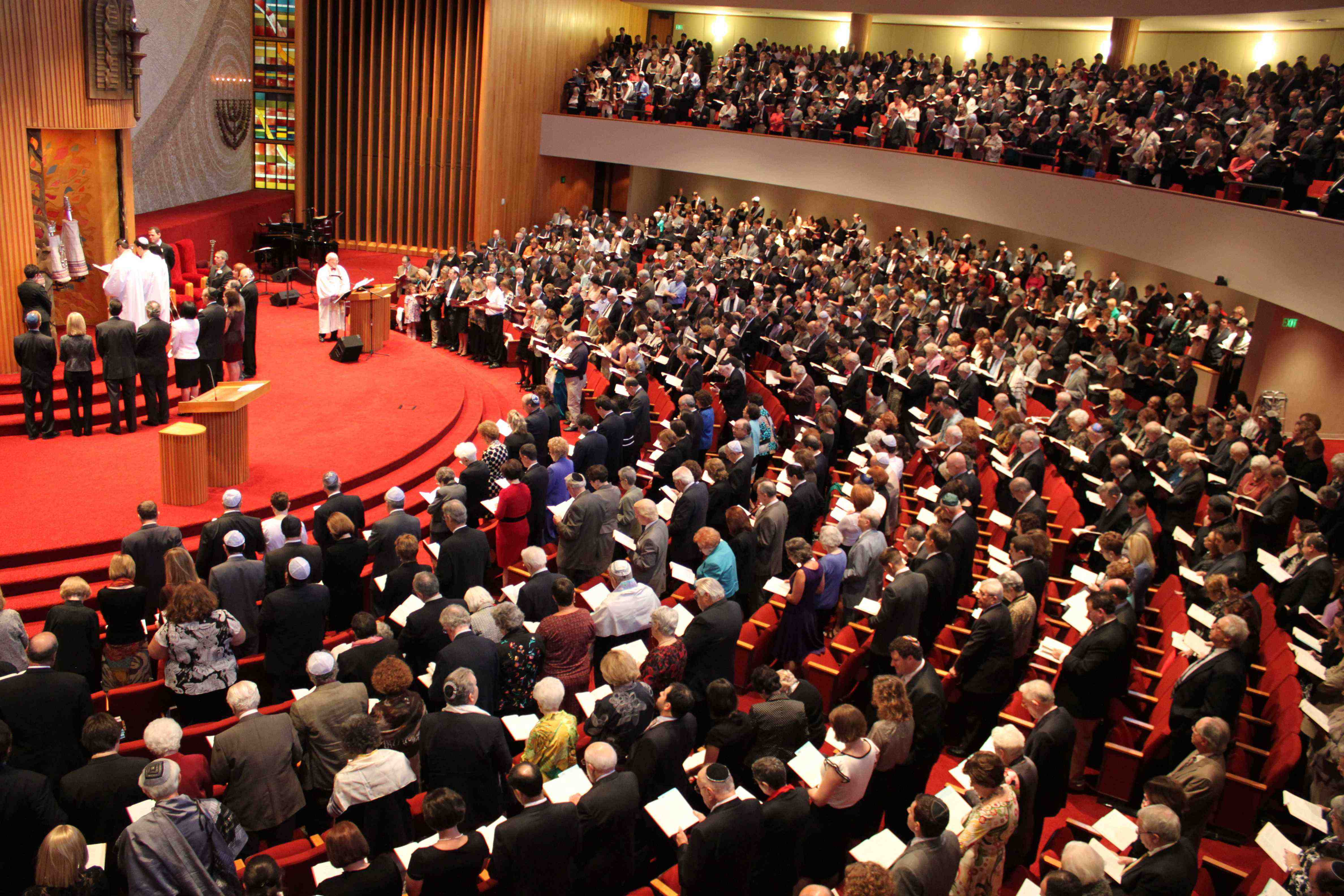
Sanctuary, East Massey Road building

By 1957 the synagogue sanctuary, which had been designed for 350 families, had become too small to accommodate Temple Israel's over 1,100 member families. In addition, since the 1950s Memphis's Jewish community had been steadily moving from the downtown, where Temple Israel's Poplar Avenue building was located, to the eastern suburbs; by 1957 over half of the members, and three-quarters of those with children in the congregational school, lived there. School attendance increased rapidly, and the student body soon outgrew its 1951 building. The school had to split attendance in 1959, with the younger children attending on Saturday and the older ones on Sunday, and by 1961, 780 children were enrolled. In the early 1960s, Temple Israel began holding weekday classes at Beth Sholom, which was closer to most members.

In 1963, Temple Israel drew up plans for a new building, and in 1964 purchased land on White Station Road. In 1966, the members voted against building there, as older members were attached to the existing building, and concerned about expenses, but by the early 1970s, the situation could no longer be ignored. Plough offered to donate one-quarter of the $4 million cost of a new building. The land on White Station Road was sold, and a 30-acre (12 ha) property on East Massey Road was purchased; the congregation moved into the new building in September 1976. The old synagogue was sold to Mid-America Baptist Theological Seminary, which would occupy it for the next twenty years. The new building was designed by Francis Gassner of Gassner, Nathan and Partners, with Percival Goodman as consulting architect. It was constructed of steel and masonry, which was used for both the exterior and interior, and had copper roofing. In the front, a glass covered garden entered into a two-story reception area, which led to a smaller foyer, and ultimately to the main sanctuary. It had 32 classrooms, and a 300-seat chapel, later named the Danziger Chapel in honor of rabbi Harry Danziger and his wife Jeanne. The ner tamid, Torah ark doors, and Ten Commandments wall decoration from the Poplar Road building were installed in the new chapel.

The sanctuary, which sat up to 1,500, was semi-circular in shape, and designed so that no worshiper was more than fifteen rows from the Torah ark. It was lit by skylights, and had a balcony. Its ceiling, along with those of the entrance foyer and chapel, were of oak, as were the doors, trim, and paneling. The building's interior art work was designed by Efrem Weitzman, including the Torah ark, most ritual objects, stained glass, mosaics, and tapestries. In the architect's view, the compact design of the sanctuary, and the liberal use of stained glass and wood, "achieved the desired feelings of intimacy". On the same level as the balcony was a gallery, originally designed for art and Judaica exhibits. In 1994, upon the donation by Herta and Justin Adler of the Adler Judaica Collection, this became a permanent museum. The complex at 1376 East Massey Road had a final cost of $7 million (today $39.6 million), of which Plough donated over $2 million. In gratitude for his donation, Plough was named honorary president for life.

In 2003, the congregation embarked on a significant renovation and expansion of its facility. Over 100,000 square feet (9,300 m^{2}) of space, including the social hall, was renovated, and a 25,000 sq ft (2,300 m^{2}) early childhood and family center addition was built, creating a U-shaped wing around a courtyard. Architect Walt Reed of The Crump Firm said he kept the emphasis on "simple, geometric, contemporary forms" that existed in the original building, as well as using the same copper roofing and detailing materials. The approximately $15 million construction project took two years, and was completed in 2007. "Wings to the Heavens", David Ascalon's 30-foot (9.1 m)-high, welded aluminum and stainless steel abstract kinetic sculpture, was installed in the atrium.

== Danziger era (1978–2000), 21st century ==
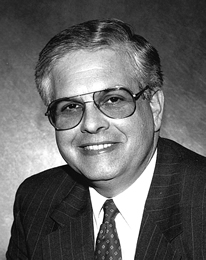
Rabbi Harry Danziger

Harry K. Danziger succeeded Wax as rabbi in 1978. The son of a rabbi, Danziger was a graduate of the University of Cincinnati, and ordained by the HUC. He joined Temple Israel as assistant rabbi in 1964, but in 1969 moved to Monroe, Louisiana, to lead Congregation B'nai Israel. He was replaced first by Howard Schwartz, then by Richard Birnholz. Birnholz tendered his resignation in 1973, and Wax began to think of retirement. Danziger, then at Baltimore's Temple Oheb Shalom, was approached as Wax's successor, and returned to Temple Israel that year as associate rabbi. Synagogue membership had been around 1,350 families from the mid-1960s, but increased after the move to East Massey Road. By Wax's retirement it had reached around 1,500, and over half Memphis's 10,000 Jews were members of Temple Israel.

In his first sermon as associate rabbi, Danziger said "we can afford to look Jewish after all these years and ... out of self-respect alone, we cannot afford not to". As senior rabbi he slowly brought more traditional observances back to Temple Israel, moving it away from the radicalism of "Classical Reform" Judaism. These observances included the chanting of Torah blessings, a Torah procession through the sanctuary aisles, fasting on Yom Kippur, circumcising baby boys, and saying the kaddish for the deceased. In 1979, he gradually replaced the old Union Prayer Book with the new Gates of Prayer prayer book, and later began wearing a tallit while on the bimah. The changes were not uncontroversial, and the latter prompted one member to resign in protest. Though more traditional than his more recent predecessors, he was willing to perform intermarriages, but also counseled the couples as to the meaning of making a Jewish home. Danziger was involved in the Central Conference of American Rabbis and eventually became its president.

John Kaplan joined as cantor in 1981, and made the services less formal and more interactive. His innovations included bringing in more modern tunes, encouraging congregational singing, and accompanying the services with a guitar, rather than the organ. By 2006, Friday night services included a "spirit" service, at which a house band played.

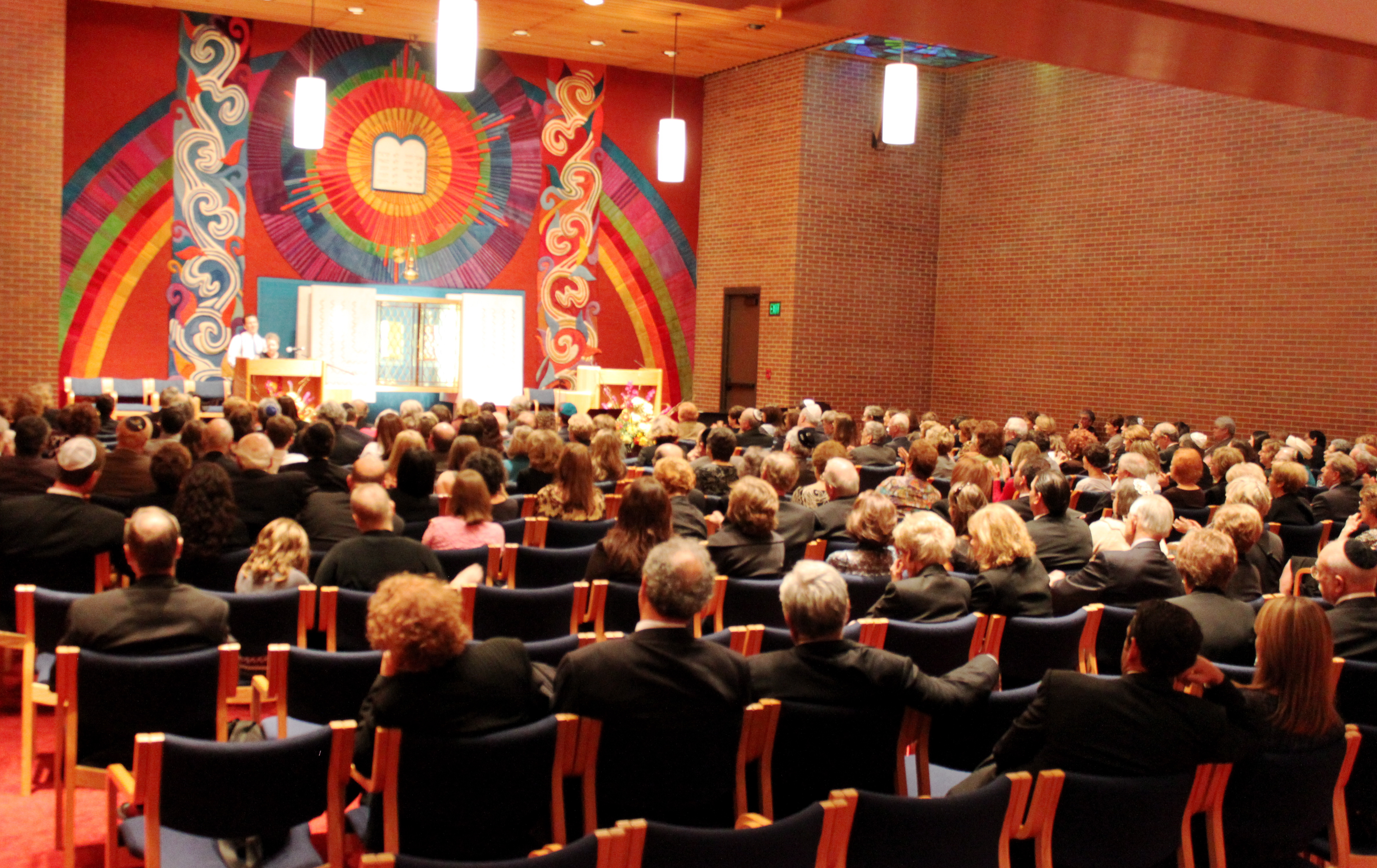
Chapel, East Massey Road building

During Danziger's tenure, assistant rabbis included Alan Greenbaum (1977–1981), Harry Rosenfeld (1981–1984), Constance Abramson Golden—Temple Israel's first female rabbi—(1984–1986), and Marc Belgrad (1986–1991). Micah D. Greenstein, the son of rabbi Howard Greenstein, succeeded Belgrad as assistant rabbi in 1991, and was subsequently promoted to associate rabbi. A graduate of Cornell University and the John F. Kennedy School of Government, he was ordained by the HUC. On Danziger's retirement in 2000, he became senior rabbi. An advocate for social justice, he tried to convince the Shelby County Commission to pass a law forbidding discrimination against LGBT people, and has used the Bible to present counter-arguments to those supporting such discrimination based on biblical verses. He has served twice as president of the Memphis Ministers Association, and sits on the boards of several local non-profit organizations.

Valerie Cohen joined as assistant rabbi in 1999, and served until 2003, before becoming rabbi of Beth Israel Congregation of Jackson, Mississippi, and subsequently Temple Emanuel Sinai of Worcester, Massachusetts (2014 to present). Adam B. Grossman, a graduate of Ohio State and Xavier universities, and ordained at HUC, joined as assistant rabbi in June 2008. He had previously served as a rabbinic intern at Dayton, Ohio's Temple Israel. Katie M. Bauman, a graduate of Washington University in St. Louis, and ordained at HUC, joined as assistant rabbi in July 2009. She had previously served in rabbinic roles in Natchez, Mississippi and Marion, Ohio, as a cantor in Cincinnati, Ohio's Rockdale Temple, and in 2003–2004, as Temple Israel's Artist and Educator in Residence.

Temple Israel experienced modest fluctuations in membership during the 1990s and 2000s, and approximately half the Jews attending services in Memphis worshiped there. In 1995, membership was over 1,700 family units, and by 2004, it had reached 1,800, and the religious school had 800 students. By 2008, the school (renamed the Wendy and Avron Fogelman Religious School) had 500 students, and by 2010 membership had fallen to under 1,600 families. It remained, nevertheless, the only Reform synagogue in Memphis, the largest and oldest synagogue in Tennessee, and one of the largest Reform synagogues in the United States. As of 2026, Micah Greenstein is the senior rabbi, with Ross Levy and Leah Sternberg as associate rabbis, Harry Danziger as rabbi emeritus, and John Kaplan as cantor emeritus.
