= Jonathan Kaplan (disambiguation) =

Jonathan Kaplan (1947–2025) is an American film producer and director.

Jonathan Kaplan may also refer to:

- Jonathan Kaplan (rugby union) (born 1966), rugby union referee
- Jonathan Kaplan (writer) (born 1956), South Africa-born medical doctor and writer
- Jonathan E. Kaplan, technology entrepreneur and US ambassador to Singapore

== See also ==
- Jon Kaplan (disambiguation)
- John Kaplan (disambiguation)
