= Jon Kaplan =

Jon Kaplan may refer to:

- Jon Kaplan (composer) (born 1976), American composer, lyricist and comedy writer
- Jon Kaplan (theatre critic) (1947–2017), Canadian theatre critic
- Jon Kaplan (record producer), American record producer

== See also ==
- Jonathan Kaplan (disambiguation)
- John Kaplan (disambiguation)
