= David Ascalon =

American sculptor (born 1945)

- דוד אשקלון
- The artist circa 1989
- Born: March 8, 1945 (age 81); Tel Aviv, British Mandate of Palestine
- Education: Pratt Institute
- Occupations: sculptor, stained glass artist
- Relatives: Brad Ascalon, son

David Ascalon (Hebrew: דוד אשקלון; born March 8, 1945) is an Israeli contemporary sculptor and stained glass artist, and co-founder of Ascalon Studios.

== Biography ==
Ascalon was born in Tel Aviv, in the British Mandate of Palestine (now Israel) on March 8, 1945. He received his early artistic training as an apprentice of his father, the Hungarian-born sculptor and industrial designer, Maurice Ascalon (1913–2003).

Ascalon came to the United States as a teenager when his father took the family across the Atlantic as a means to broaden their horizons. He attended Beverly Hills High School in Beverly Hills, California and graduated in 1963.

Ascalon studied art and design at the California State University at Northridge as well as architecture and interior design at California Polytechnic State University in San Luis Obispo, and Pratt Institute in New York, where he received his degree.

Throughout the 1970s, Ascalon worked in the fields of interior design and architecture in New York, and for the firm of the noted Israeli architect Aryeh Elhanani in Tel Aviv. Seeking a more immediate means of artistic expression than the architectural arts would allow, he began experimenting in sculptural metalwork, exploring abstract compositions with a welding torch.

In recent years, Ascalon has taken an active role on issues of artist rights advocacy, and in 2010 filed a federal suit under the Visual Artists Rights Act (VARA) in a case involving the rights of artist with respect to the restoration of public sculpture. Among Ascalon's other relatives are his son, contemporary industrial designer Brad Ascalon, and older brother Adir Ascalon (d. 2003). Adir was a surrealist painter and sculptor who collaborated with the noted Mexican muralist David Alfaro Siqueiros. Ascalon is also a licensed airplane private pilot.

Ascalon resides in the Philadelphia suburb of Cherry Hill, New Jersey, and in the Hamptons on the east end of Long Island, New York.

== Ascalon Studios ==
In 1977, Ascalon relocated to the Philadelphia metropolitan area where he joined up with his father to form Ascalon Studios. It was then that he began focusing his efforts on the creation of site-specific artwork for worship and public spaces. Much of his work draws on ecclesiastical themes, however utilizing non-traditional approaches and contemporary forms. In the years since its founding, Ascalon Studios, under his direction, has executed hundreds of projects throughout North America, ranging from monumental sculptures and liturgical stained glass windows, to mosaic murals. Many of his works adorn synagogue architecture and other venues for worship. Among his sculptural installations are a number of Holocaust Memorials that pay tribute to the victims of the atrocities (included are many from his own family).

== Awards and recognition ==
Ascalon has been the recipient of major international design commissions and awards, including from the American Institute of Architects' Interfaith Forum on Religion, Art and Architecture. He is a member of the International Sculpture Center, and he is past president of the American Guild of Judaic Art and has lectured on the subject of Judaic art.

== COVID-19 Response ==
In response to the COVID-19 pandemic and shortages of Personal Protective Equipment (PPE) for healthcare workers throughout the United States, in April 2020, Ascalon retooled the Ascalon Studios facility in order to produce hundred of specialty devices known as COVID-19 Intubation Safety Boxes for donation to American hospitals. The Safety Boxes, first used by healthcare workers in January 2020 when the pandemic hit Taiwan, are specialized acrylic cubes with flap-sealed hand holes that fit over the head and torso of infected patients, designed to allow doctors, nurses, and first responders the ability to undertake ventilator intubation and extubation while minimizing exposure to contaminated secretions emanated during the process.

== Gallery ==
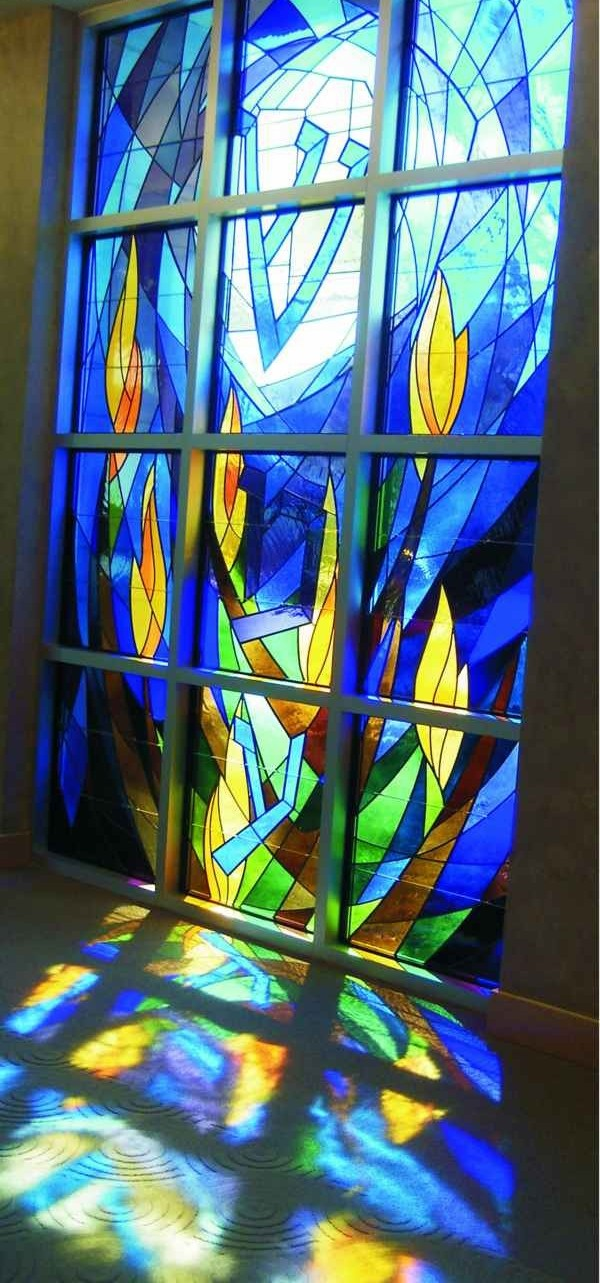
From a series of abstract stained glass windows for Congregation Beth El near Washington, D.C.

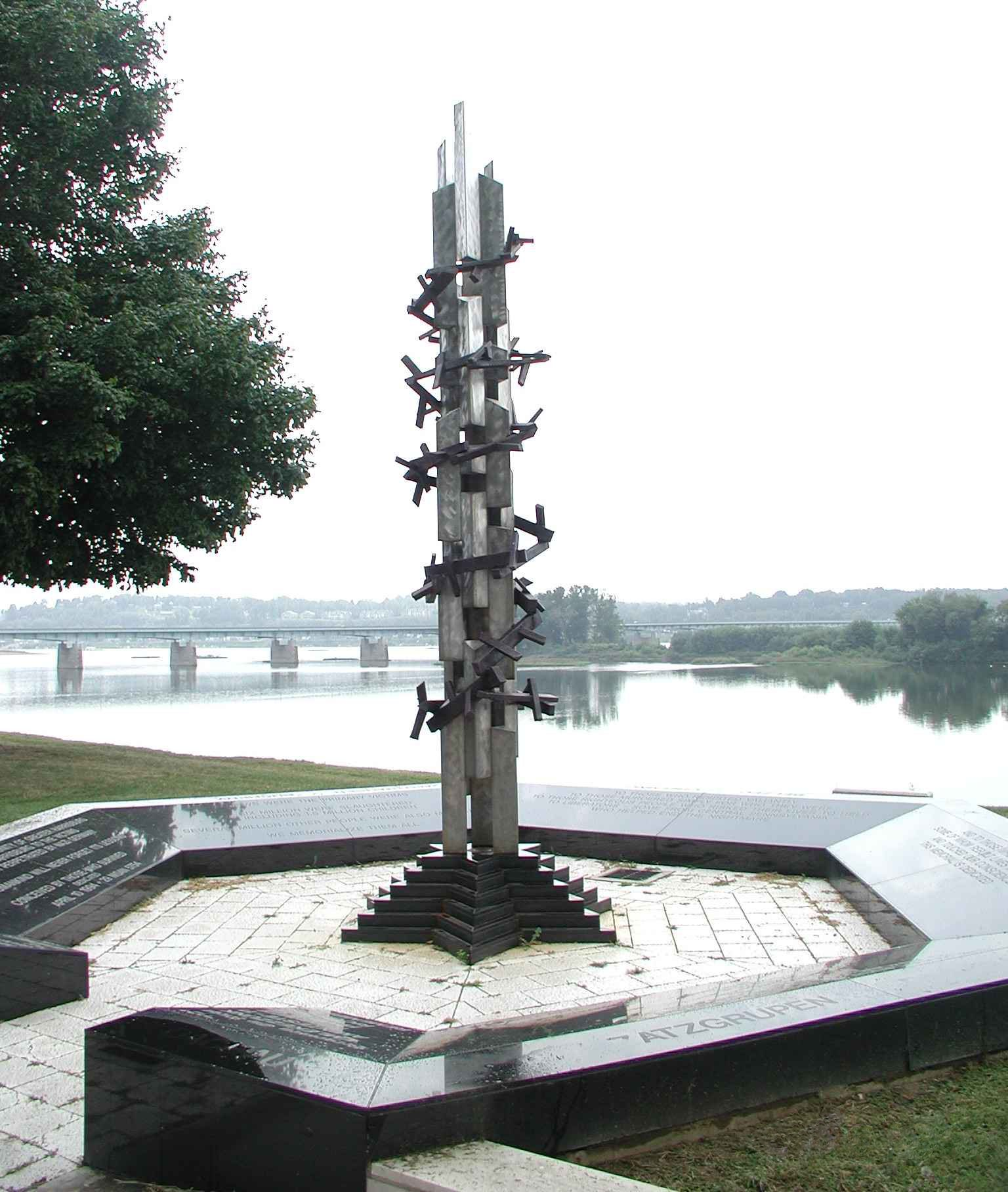
David Ascalon's Holocaust Memorial for the Commonwealth of Pennsylvania (1994), on the Susquehanna River, Harrisburg

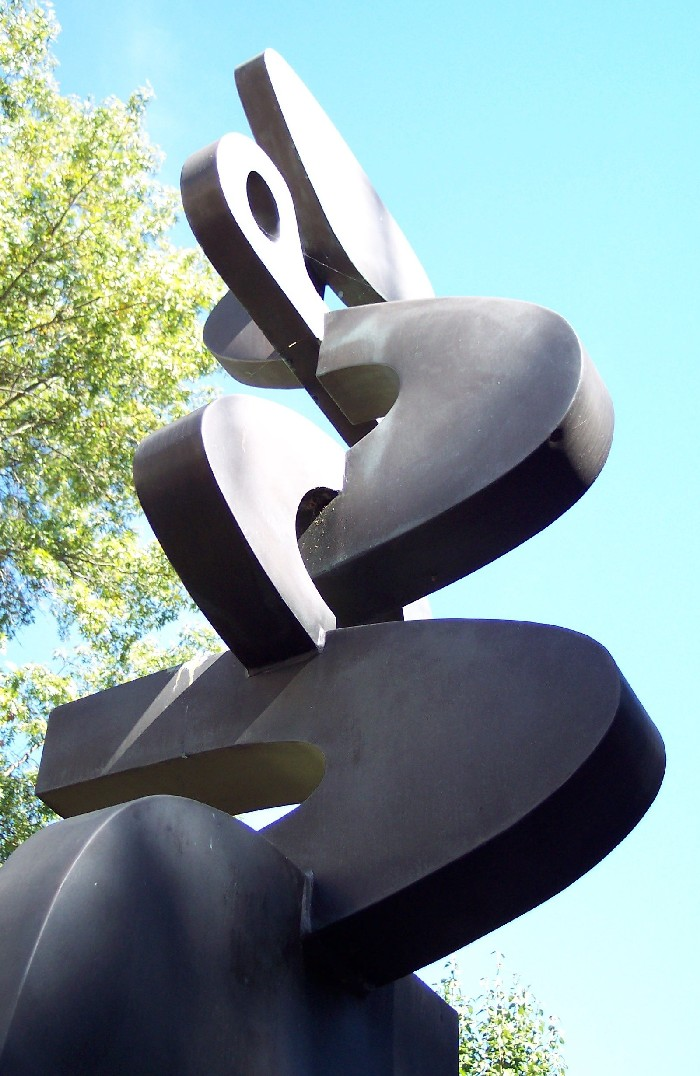
David Ascalon's "Totem", fabricated bronze sculpture at the Cherry Hill Public Library, Cherry Hill, New Jersey

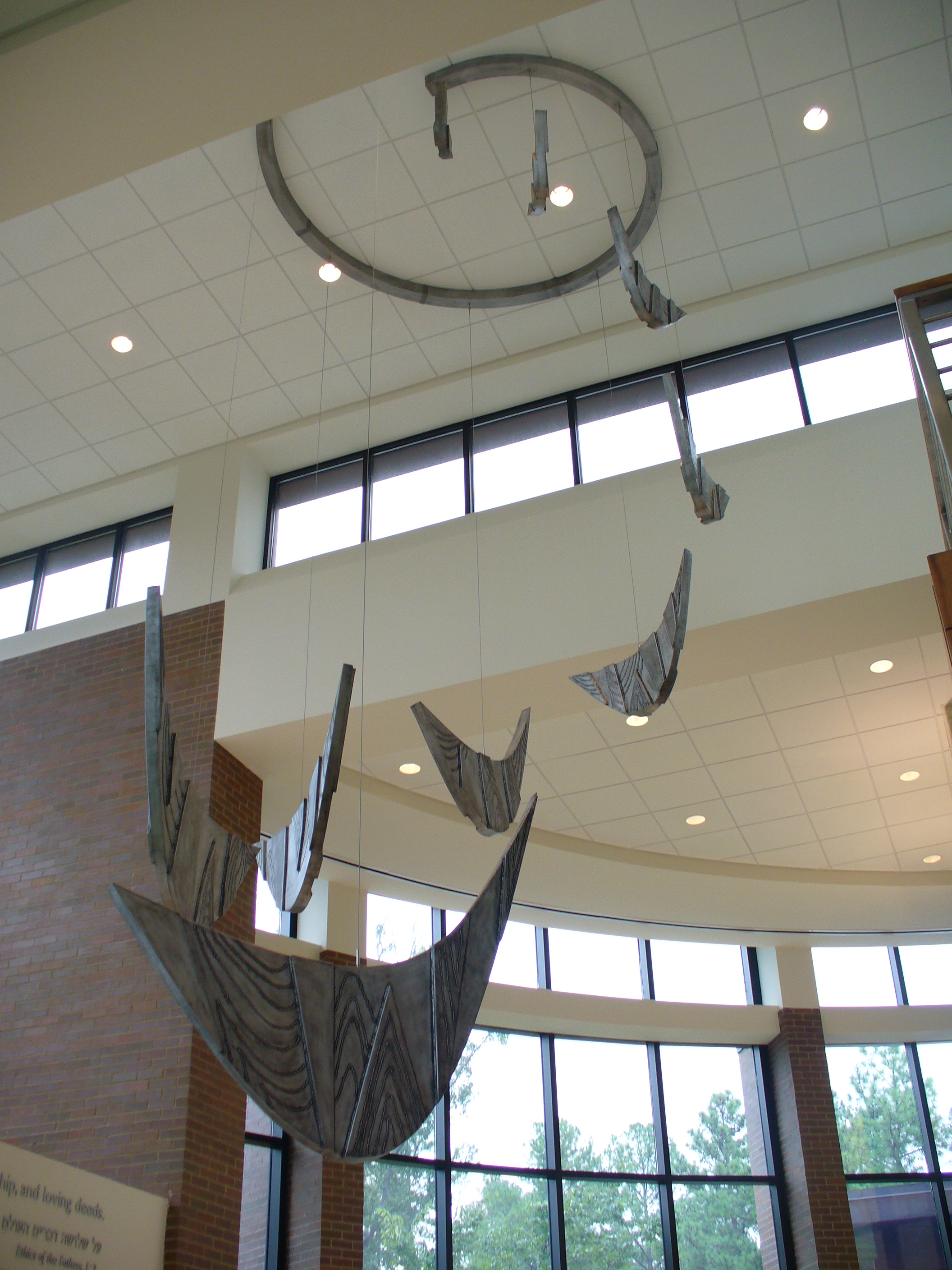
"Wings to the Heavens" kinetic sculpture mobile by David Ascalon with Brad Ascalon and Eric Ascalon, 2008, Temple Israel (Memphis, Tennessee)

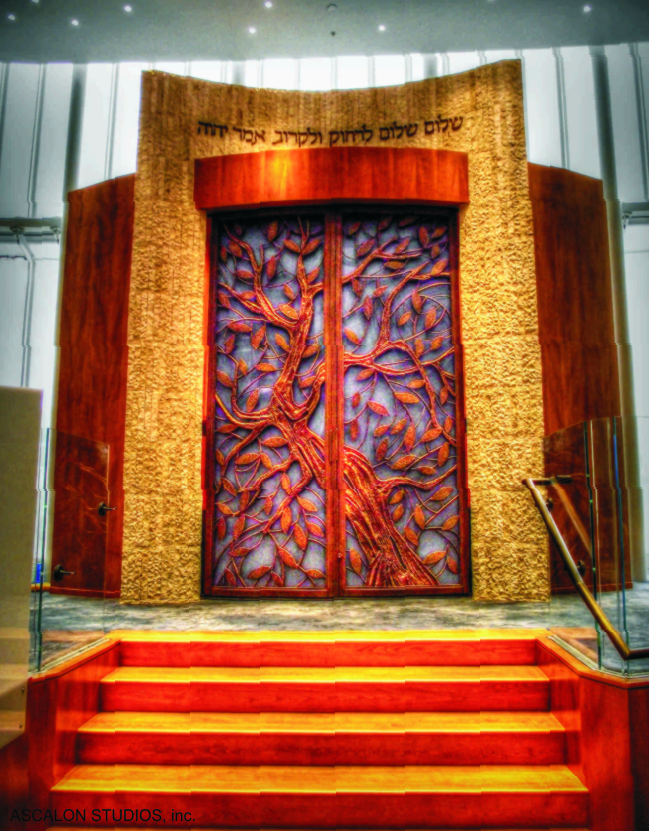
Sanctuary ark for Lincoln Square Synagogue, New York City (2013), by David Ascalon.
