= Walter Arnheim =

American oil company executive

Walter R. Arnheim
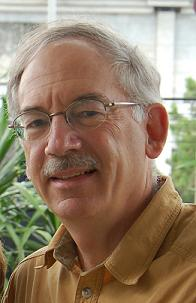
- Born: Walter Richard Arnheim; October 10, 1944 (age 81); Pittsburgh, Pennsylvania, United States
- Education: University of Pittsburgh (BS); Columbia University (MBA)
- Occupation: Executive Director at Washington National Opera (2000-2002) Treasurer at Mobil Oil (1995-1999)
- Spouse: Marsha Rehns
- Children: 2

Walter R. Arnheim (born October 10, 1944, Pittsburgh, Pennsylvania) is an American oil company executive and former director of the Washington National Opera. He is currently a renewable energy specialist, private equity manager, and an adviser to companies and non-profit organizations.

== Life and career ==
=== Education ===
Arnheim earned his BS in chemical engineering degree from the University of Pittsburgh in 1966 and an MBA in operations research and finance from Columbia University in 1968.

=== Oil executive ===
For more than three decades, he was employed by Mobil Oil joining the company in 1968 in operations research. He retired as treasurer of the company following the merger with ExxonMobil in 1999. Over the course of his 31 years with the company, he served in multiple positions and locations, including assistant treasurer for Europe and Africa, based in London, and vice president for economics and planning, based in Mobil's US headquarters.

=== The Washington Opera ===
After leaving Mobil, Arnheim joined the Washington Opera as executive director in January 2000, which he led for two and a half years, working closely with artistic director Plácido Domingo and overseeing a period of rapid growth and expansion for the company. A long-time opera afficiando, he previously served as Mobil's representative on the board of the Washington Opera from 1996-1999. The move to opera management was an opportunity to bring his business acumen to support the nonprofit world. While serving as Executive Director, Arnheim lead a $2 million renovation and relocation of the Washington Opera's costume and rehearsal studio to Takoma Park

=== Other positions ===
Over the course of his career he has served on the board of multiple companies, including Compaq and Spinnaker Oil Company, until it was acquired by Norsk Hydro. He taught as an associate professor at Hofstra University Business School and has been recognized as a distinguished alumni by the University of Pittsburgh.

== Recent activities ==
He is currently President of Mozaik Investments, a private equity firm. He also serves on the board of Magellan Midstream Partners, a publicly listed petroleum logistics company with the longest system of refined petroleum product pipelines in the US, and Opera Lafayette, a DC-based opera company.

As a recognized expert in renewable energy, he has advised the government of Serbia on how to develop the biomass market as part of a program funded by USAID. He believes that there is significant potential in the sector, especially the conversion from woodwaste to pellets.

He has a doppelganger in the form of a picture of a tailor sitting at a sewing machine, a commonly used decal among dry cleaners in the US. Arnheim did not serve as its model.

== Personal interests ==
In addition to Arnheim's passion for opera, which is focused on German operas, including those by Richard Wagner and Richard Strauss, he has an interest in ice hockey and played amateur hockey for a period. A member of Beth El Synagogue, he served as president of the congregation from 2005 to 2007.
