= Ashkelon (disambiguation) =

Ashkelon may refer to:

== Places ==
- Ashkelon, a coastal city in the South District of Israel
- Ascalon, the ancient city of Ashkelon, destroyed in 1270, and now an archaeological site

== Organizations ==
- Ironi Ashkelon, Israeli basketball team
- Hapoel Ashkelon F.C., Israeli football club
- Hof Ashkelon Regional Council, a regional council surrounding Ashkelon, Israel
- Eilat Ashkelon Pipeline Company, an Israeli petroleum company

== Schools ==
- Ashkelon Academic College

== Other ==
- Ashkelon Railway Station, a railway station in Ashkelon, Israel
- The Streets of Ashkelon, a science fiction short story by Harry Harrison

== See also ==
- Ascalon (disambiguation)
