= John Kaplan (cantor) =

American cantor

John Kaplan is an American cantor. He was Chair of the Committee on Ethics and Appeals of the American Conference of Cantors (ACC) and was Secretary of the ACC Executive Board. In 2010, the ACC named him Volunteer of the Year. In 1981, he became Cantor of Temple Israel in Memphis, Tennessee, where he served as clergy liaison to its committee on congregational caring, God’s Unfinished Business. In 2014, he became spiritual leader of CongregationB'nai Israel in Jackson, a position similar to that of a pastor, which had traditionally been held by a rabbi.

== Education ==
Kaplan attended University of North Texas, then obtained a Master of Arts in Religion degree from Memphis Theological Seminary. His Cantorial Certification and Investiture was from the HUC-JIR School of Sacred Music in New York. He trained under Cantor Joseph Cycowski in Palm Springs, California, then trained under Cantor William Sharlin of the Hebrew Union College-Jewish Institute of Religion in Los Angeles, California.
