= Maurice Ascalon =

American sculptor (1913-2003)

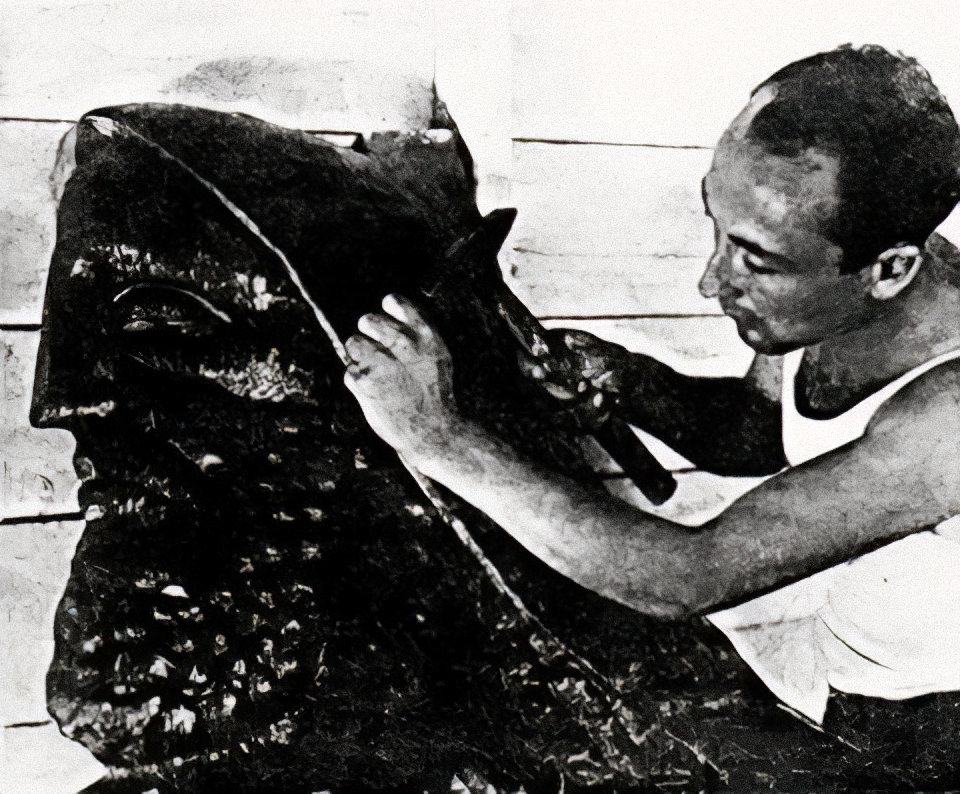
Ascalon hammering "The Scholar, The Laborer, and The Toiler of the Soil", a copper relief sculpture that was on the façade of the Jewish Palestine Pavilion of the 1939 New York World's Fair

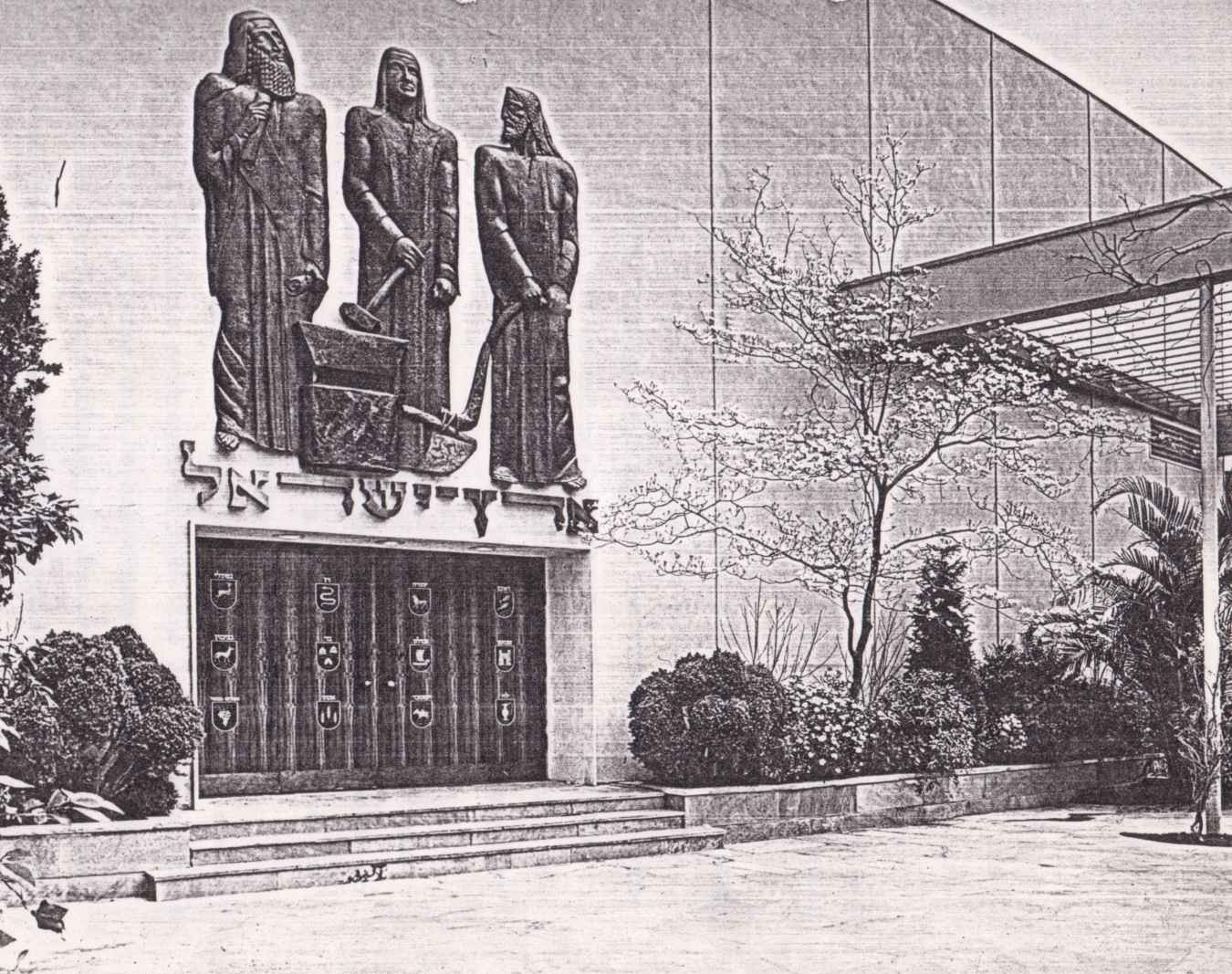
"The Scholar, The Laborer, and The Toiler of the Soil"

Maurice Ascalon (Hebrew: מוריס אשקלון; 1913–2003) was an Israeli designer and sculptor.

== Biography ==
Moshe Klein (later Maurice Ascalon) was born in eastern Hungary (the town of Fehérgyarmat). From an early age, he was drawn to art, which was frowned upon in the eastern Hungarian "shtetl" in which he was raised. When he was 15 years old Klein left his boyhood home to study art at the Académie Royale des Beaux-Arts in Brussels. He took with him an understanding of Jewish rituals and traditions which knowledge he later incorporated in his work.

In 1934, after undertaking his formal artistic training in Brussels and later Milan, Maurice Ascalon immigrated to the land of Israel (then the British Mandate of Palestine). There he met his wife-to-be, Zipora Kartujinsky, a Polish-born Jew, granddaughter to the distinguished cartographer and scientist of the same surname. (Zipora, who died in 1982, became a sculptor in her own right late in her life, creating bas reliefs depicting the shtetl life of her childhood).

== Art career ==
In 1939, Maurice Ascalon designed and created the enormous 14-foot-tall (4.3 m) hammered repoussé copper relief sculpture of three figures, "The Tiller of the Soil, the Laborer and the Scholar", which adorned the façade of the Jewish Palestine Pavilion of the 1939 New York World's Fair. Ascalon was commissioned to create this work for the historically significant Pavilion which introduced the world to the concept of a modern Jewish state. (The work is now part of the collection of the Spertus Institute for Jewish Learning and Leadership in Chicago.)

In the late 1930s, Ascalon founded an Israeli decorative arts manufacturing company, Pal-Bell, which produced trademark bronze and brass menorahs and other Judaic and secular decorative art and functional items that were exported in large numbers worldwide. Maurice Ascalon's designs, some art deco, others more traditional, introduced the use of a chemically induced green patina (verdigris) to Israeli metalwork. During Israel's War for Independence in 1948, he designed munitions for the Israeli army and, at the request of the Israeli government, retrofitted his factory to produce munitions for the war effort. In 1956 Maurice immigrated to the United States.

During the latter part of the 1950s through the 1960s, Maurice resided in New York and Los Angeles. He gained a reputation as a master silversmith, creating for synagogues Torah crowns and other objects of Jewish ceremonial art. For a time, he taught sculpture on the fine arts faculty of the University of Judaism (now the American Jewish University) in Los Angeles.

In the late 1970s, Ascalon Studios, and Ascalon himself, relocated to Cherry Hill, New Jersey, in the Philadelphia area. It became (and still is today, under the direction of Maurice's son, David Ascalon) a multifaceted art studio dedicated to the design of and creation of site-specific art for worship and public spaces.

In February 2003, Maurice Ascalon celebrated his 90th birthday as a resident of Cuernavaca, Mexico, where he lived with his eldest son, Adir Ascalon (Adir was a surrealist painter and sculptor who collaborated with the noted Mexican muralist David Alfaro Siqueiros). In August 2003, Maurice Ascalon succumbed to complications related to Parkinson's disease.

Maurice Ascalon's commissions include permanent installations at worship and public spaces throughout the United States, Mexico, and Israel. His works have been exhibited at and are among the collections of institutions including the Jewish Museum (New York), the Museum of American Jewish History in Philadelphia, Spertus Institute for Jewish Learning and Leadership in Chicago, the Eretz Israel Museum in Tel Aviv, and the University of Judaism in Los Angeles.

== See also ==
- Visual arts in Israel
- Brad Ascalon

== Bibliography ==
- Schwarz, Jessica; Ha'tell, Aaron (June 21, 2010). A Celebration of Light: Treasured Hanukkah Menorahs of Early Israel. Lulu Enterprises Inc. ISBN 978-0-557-13711-4.
- Bull, Donald A. (2009). Figural Corkscrews. Schiffer Publishing Ltd. ISBN 978-0-7643-3315-6.
- Ha'Tell, Aaron; Ha'tell, Ari; Ben Or, Yaniv (November 2006). Lighting the way to freedom: treasured Hanukkah menorahs of early Israel. Devora Publishing. ISBN 978-1-932687-66-8.
- Kenaan-Kedar, Nurith (2006). Modern creations from an ancient land: metal craft and design in the first two decades of Israel's independence, from the collection of Vicky Ben-Zioni. Yad Izhak Ben-Zvi/ Eretz Israel Museum/ Tel Aviv University. ISBN 965-217-256-1
- Braunstein, Susan L. (2004). Five centuries of Hanukkah lamps from the Jewish Museum: a catalogue raisonné. Jewish Museum (New York, N.Y.). ISBN 978-0-300-10623-7.
- Braunstein, Susan L. (2004). Luminous art: Hanukkah menorahs of the Jewish Museum. Jewish Museum, under the auspices of the Jewish Theological Seminary of America. ISBN 978-0-300-10387-8.
- Aisenberg, Lydia (November 30, 2007). "Enlightening". The Jerusalem Post.
- "New Jersey Artist Honored Posthumously in Tel Aviv" New Jersey Jewish News, December 15, 2005 at 50.
- "Jews Who Died in 2003". Jewish Telegraphic Agency. January 2, 2004. Archived from the original on September 28, 2012.
- "In the Frame" by Gil Goldfine, The Jerusalem Post, August 15, 2003 p.B14.
- Sculptor Maurice Ascalon Dies" by Barbara Rothschild, The Courier-Post, August 7, 2003 at B1.
- "M. Ascalon Maker of Judaic Art", The Philadelphia Inquirer, August 5, 2003.
- "Sculpture by Cherry Hill artist that envisioned modern State of Israel is memorialized", by Ezra Solway, The Jewish Community Voice, June 14, 2023.
