= Eretz Israel Museum =

Museum in Tel Aviv, Israel

Coordinates: 32°6′11.35″N 34°47′47.1″E

- מוזיאון ארץ ישראל
- Established: 1953
- Location: Ramat Aviv, Tel Aviv, Israel
- Type: Historical, Archaeological
- Collections: Archaeological artifacts, Ethnography, Judaica, Glassware, Coins, Copper artifacts
- Website: Eretz Israel Museum

The Eretz Israel Museum (also known as Muza) is a historical and archaeological museum in the Ramat Aviv neighborhood of Tel Aviv, Israel.

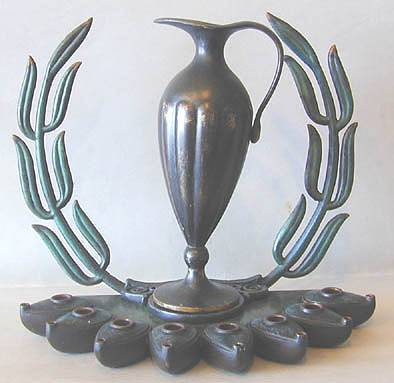
From an exhibit of Judaica at the Eretz Israel Museum, a bronze menorah designed by Maurice Ascalon

Eretz Israel Museum, established in 1953 as the Haaretz Museum, has a large display of archaeological, anthropological and historical artifacts organized in a series of exhibition pavilions on its grounds. Each pavilion is dedicated to a different subject: glassware, ceramics, coins, copper and more. The museum also has a planetarium.

The "Man and His Work" wing features live demonstrations of ancient methods of weaving, jewelry and pottery making, grain grinding and bread baking. Tel Qasile, an excavation in which 12 distinct layers of culture have been uncovered, is on the grounds of the museum.

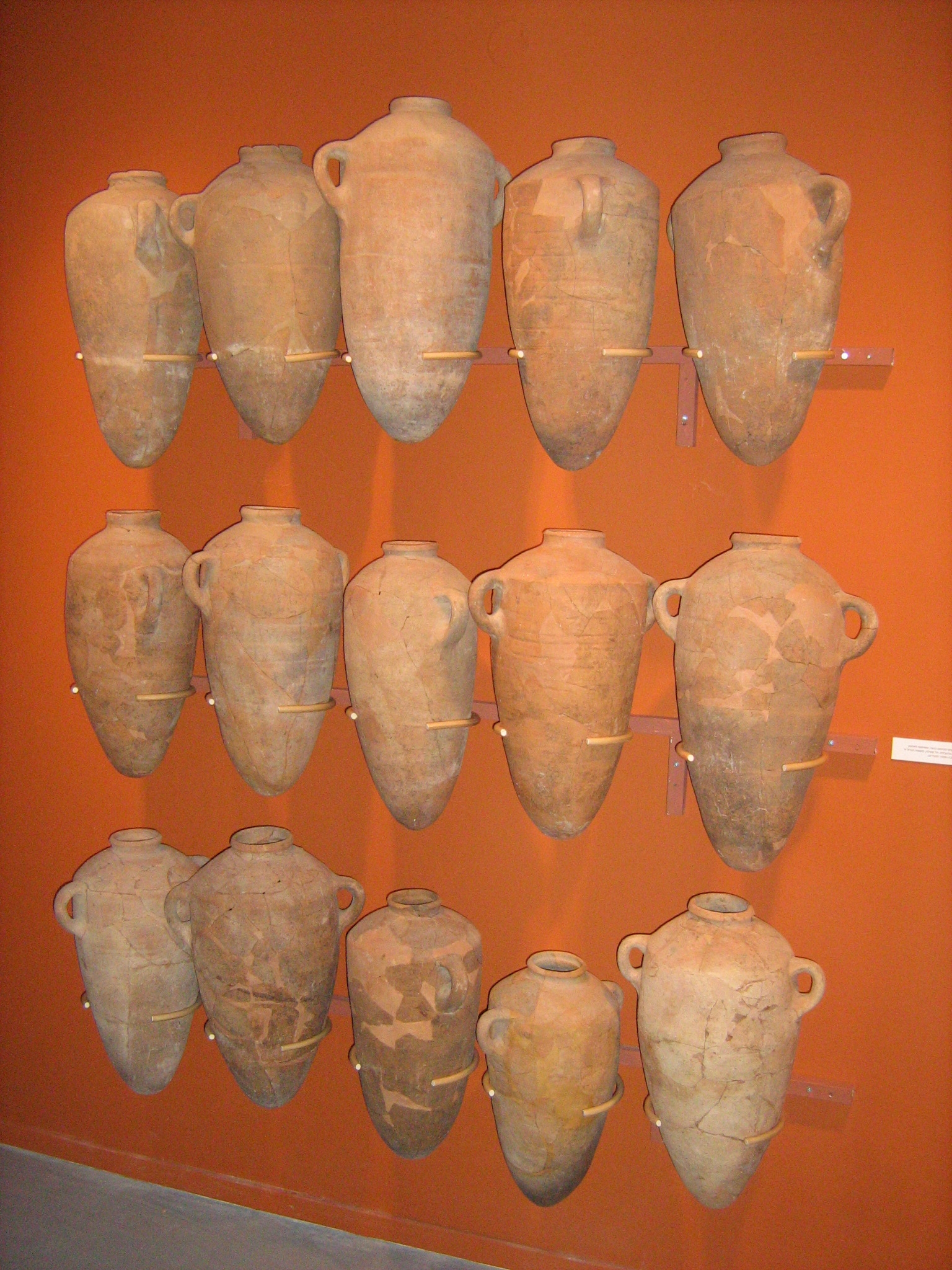
Amphorae discovered at Tel Quasile

== Museum history ==
The museum was established on the depopulated Palestinian village Al-Shaykh Muwannis by the city of Tel Aviv in 1953. Its collection began with glass and ceramics donated by Walter Moses.

In 1981 Shlomo Lahat, the mayor of Tel Aviv, pressured the museum's board of directors to appoint Rehavam Ze'evi as museum director. Ze'evi was director of the museum from 1981 to 1989, was chairman of its board from 1989 to 1994 and remained a board member until 1999. During his tenure $11 million the city invested in the museum, new buildings were created, and staff numbers grew, although visitor numbers declined. The construction works led to the destruction of a Byzantine mosaic on the museum grounds, for which Ze'evi was interviewed by the police.

== Archaeology ==
=== Ancient copper production ===
The Nechushtan pavilion is dedicated to the copper production at Timna in the southern Negev during the Chalcolithic, Bronze and Iron Age periods. The pavilion contains a reconstructed mine, smelting furnaces, and findings from the Egyptian-Midianite mining temple at Timna.

The reconstructed Chalcolithic and Late Bronze Age mine displays mining tools such as stone hammers, flint blades and copper chisels, as well as the typical marks they left on the rock.

Four smelting furnaces are on display:

- Bowl furnace from the Chalcolithic period (4th millennium BCE)
- Domed furnace of the Late Bronze Age (14th–13th centuries BCE)
- Authentic Late Bronze Age furnace (12th century BCE)
- Shaft furnace of the Iron Age (10th century BCE).

==== Midianite temple pavilion ====
In the 14th century BCE, the Egyptian pharaohs dispatched mining expeditions to Timna. Alongside expert metalsmiths from the Land of Midian, they extracted copper at Timna until the early 12th century BCE. This pavilion houses a Midianite temple model. Of special interest is the copper snake with gilded head found in the Midianite shrine, reminding of the biblical Nehushtan, "the bronze serpent that Moses had made" (Numbers 21:4–9; 2 Kings 18:4).

=== Glass pavilion ===
This pavilion exhibits ancient glass vessels. The exhibition is divided into three sections, representing three eras in the history of glass production: pre-blown glass (Late Bronze Age to Hellenistic period—15th-1st centuries BCE), blown glass of the Roman and Byzantine periods (1st–7th centuries CE), and blown glass of the Islamic period (7th–15th centuries CE). Two rare vessels on display are a delicate drinking horn with two openings, known by its Greek name "rhyton", and "Ennion's Blue Jug" bearing the signature of its famous maker, who lived in the first half of the 1st century CE.

Remnants of a glass furnace from the 13th century CE were discovered alongside the Crusader castle at Sommelaria, north of Acre.

On loan from the Israel Antiquities Authority (IAA) is a unique Byzantine (late 6th – early 7th century) gold-glass panel from the "Birds Mosaic Mansion" in Caesarea.

== Ethnography and folklore ==
The ethnography and folklore section contains Judaica produced either by the Jewish diaspora in different periods, or in the Land of Israel between 1880 and 1967.

== Numismatics ==
The Kadman Numismatic section displays means of payment used in the country, starting those used before to the development of coinage, and going through all historical periods until today.

== Postal history and philately ==
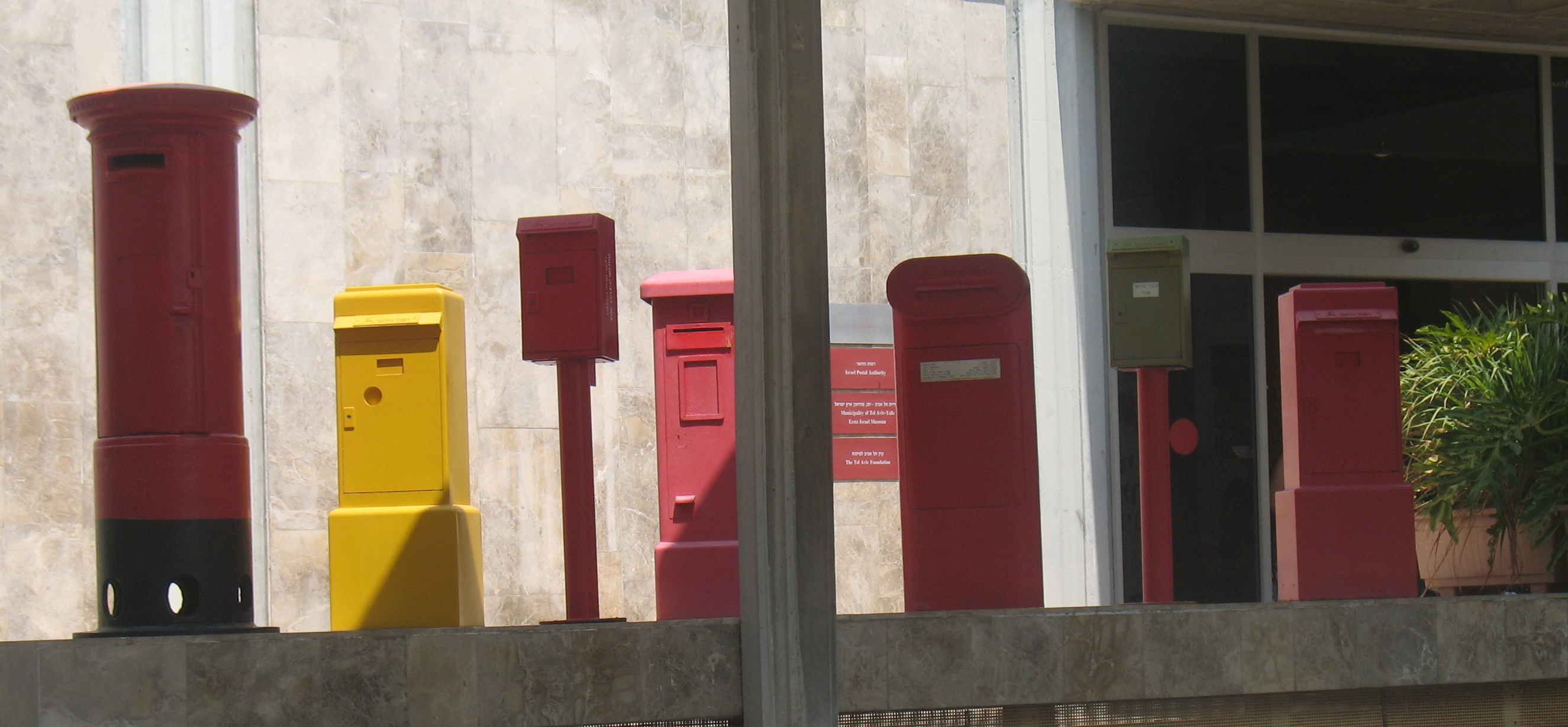
A variety of mailboxes used by the Israel Postal Service over the years, on display at Eretz Israel Museum Philatelic pavilion

The Alexander Museum of Postal History and Philately recounts the history of postal service in the Land of Israel from the mid-15th century until the founding of the state in 1948. On display are envelopes, letters, photographs, posters, mailboxes and telephones, as well as a mail truck from 1949.

The philatelic wing displays valuable and rare stamps.

== See also ==
- List of Israeli museums
- Art in Tel Aviv
