= Ascalon, Missouri =

- Unincorporated community
- Location within Missouri
- Coordinates: 38°42′03″N 90°24′34″W
- Country: United States
- State: Missouri
- County: St. Louis
- Time zone: UTC−6 (Central (CST))
  - Summer (DST): UTC−5 (CDT)
- ZIP code: 63043
- Area code: 314

Ascalon is an unincorporated community in St. Louis County, Missouri, United States located just south of St. Ann. It sits at an elevation of 656 feet (200 m).
