= Brad Ascalon =

American industrial designer

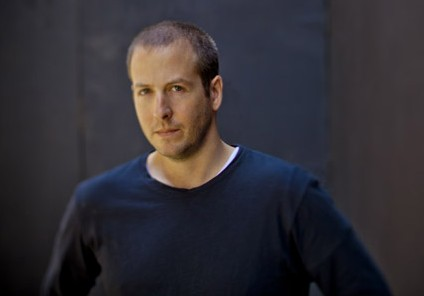
Industrial designer Brad Ascalon

Brad Ascalon (born in 1977), is an American industrial designer who grew up in the Philadelphia suburb of Cherry Hill, New Jersey. He earned a bachelor's degree at Rutgers University, and received a master's degree in industrial design from New York's Pratt Institute. His early artistic and design influences included his grandfather, the Hungarian-born Art Deco sculptor and industrial designer Maurice Ascalon, as well as his father, the American sculptor and stained glass artist David Ascalon, founder of Ascalon Studios.

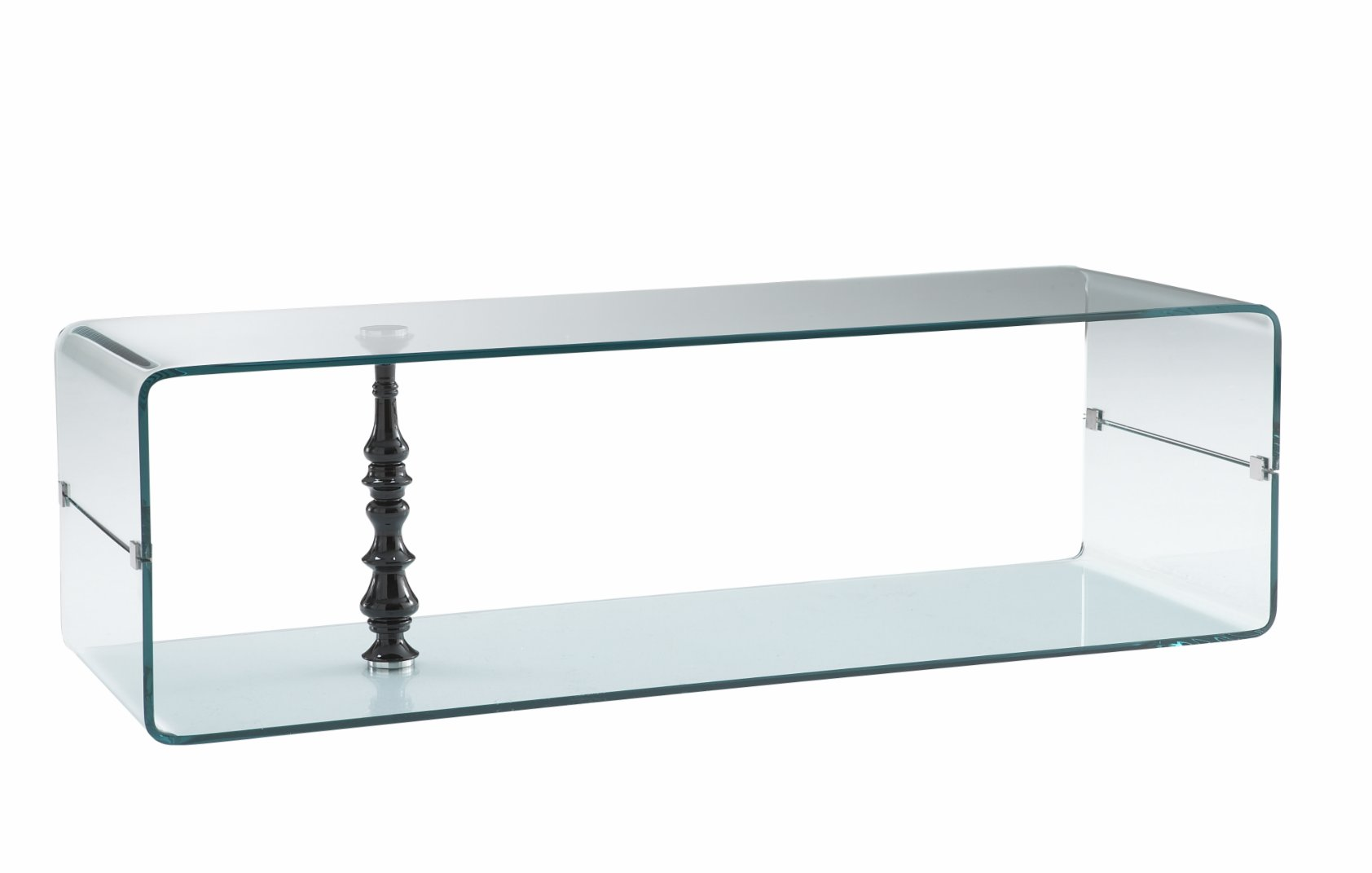
Brad Ascalon's glass and wood "Spindle Table" for Ligne Roset.

Ascalon started his eponymous studio in 2006, working in the areas of furniture, product and packaging design. Among his first clients was the cosmetics conglomerate L'Oreal. His first international recognition, however, came while he was still a graduate student, when the international design magazine Wallpaper* selected Ascalon as one of the year's top ten up-and-coming designers in the world. Since then, Ascalon's multi-disciplinary design studio has worked with clients around the world within a number of industries, most notably the furniture industry. Ascalon's furniture work has been exhibited globally, from Milan's Salone del Internazionale del Mobile, the world's largest stage for design, to Germany's IMM Cologne, Paris' Maison et Objet and NYC's International Contemporary Furniture Fair (ICFF). Ascalon's first showing at the ICFF was in 2007 as part of the ICFF Bernhardt Design Studio Exhibition, a high-profile juried competition whose primary goal is to promote emerging designers around the world. In 2008, Ascalon became one of only two Americans ever to have designed for the French furniture powerhouse, Ligne Roset; in 2010, his work started being produced by "Bernhardt Design"; and in 2011 by "Design Within Reach".
