= Ascalon, Georgia =

Unincorporated community in Georgia, U.S.

Coordinates: 34°50′22″N 85°25′29″W

Ascalon is an unincorporated community in Walker County, in the U.S. state of Georgia.

== History ==
A post office called Ascalon was established in 1881, and remained in operation until it was discontinued in 1919. The community took its name after the ancient city of Ashkelon.
