= American Guild of Judaic Art =

Non-profit organization based in Owings Mills, Maryland, US

The American Guild of Judaic Art (AGJA) is a national non-profit membership organization based in Seattle, Washington (previously Owings Mills, Maryland). It is dedicated to the promotion of Jewish art and culture in society.

Its membership includes Jewish artists, galleries, museum curators, collectors, and academics in the field of Jewish studies and art history. The organization sponsors and promotes an annual calendar of events entitled "Jewish Arts Week" in which it encourages synagogues, community centers, and schools throughout North America to host activities and exhibitions relating to Jewish art. In 2023, The AGJA was headed by its president, the artist Robin Atlas.

== History ==
Founded in 1991, it was under the leadership of past president Mark Levin AIA, that the Guild joined the internet virtual age in 1999 with creating its website featuring Guild members and their work, The Guild provides information and networking opportunities for its membership through member-only online resources as well as a members only Google online discussion group. The Guild’s calendar of Jewish Arts Week, other member events and activities, membership information, an AGJA member directory as well as an Artist’s Gallery is available for the public on the Guild’s website.

== Jewish Arts Month ==
In 2011, Jewish Arts Week became "Jewish Arts Month" in which it encourages synagogues, community centers, libraries, and schools throughout North America to host activities and exhibitions relating to and showcasing Jewish art. This special month corresponds with the Torah (Old Testament) reading of Parshat Vayakhel from Exodus: 35:1-38:20 where the first Jewish artisan, Bezalel, is introduced with descriptions of his designs to build the Mishkan (Tabernacle); as the Jewish calendar is a lunar based one, Jewish Arts Month’s dates change from year to year.

== Exhibitions ==
AGJA initiatives include expanding exhibition opportunities, community outreach programs, and collaborative educational connections to bring art, inspired by Jewish text, tradition, ritual, and personal experience to those who appreciate or want to learn more about the world of Jewish art. HIDDUR, a quarterly Email newsletter and expanding interactive social media were established in 2010.

In 2012, The AGJA launched their inaugural members online exhibition. The 2013-2014 online exhibition includes works, available for purchase, by 29 of the guild's members. Work include ketubbahs, chuppahs, paintings, works on paper, jewelry and sculpture. The exhibition was curated by Karen Walanka from the Moriah Congregation in Deerfield, IL.

== Mentoring program ==
In 2013, the American Guild of Judaic Art launched their online mentoring program for students in grades 7-12. AGJA artists volunteer to mentor student artists in an on-line venue. The mentor program is a direct approach to reaching young people who express a sincere interest in learning how to create Jewish art. Guild artists experience the opportunity to mentor, guide and inspire a young person in the world of Judaic art, all done on-line. As a Judaic arts organization, the Guild will use its numerous resources to facilitate the development and growth of the mentoring program.

== Other activities ==
In the past, the Guild has organized trips to Israel to look at religious and artistic sites.
