= List of Columbia University people in politics, military and law =

This is a list of notable persons who have had ties to Columbia University. This partial list does not include all of the numerous Columbia alumni and faculty who have served as the heads of foreign governments, in the U.S. presidential cabinet, the U.S. executive branch of government, the federal courts, or as U.S. senators, U.S. congresspersons, governors, diplomats, mayors (or other notable local officials), or as prominent members of the legal profession or the military.

== Presidents ==
- Dwight D. Eisenhower (president of Columbia University 1948–1953) – 34th president of the United States (1953–1961)
- Barack Obama (B.A. 1983) – 44th president of the United States (2009–2017), U.S. senator from Illinois (2005–2008)
- Franklin Delano Roosevelt (Law 1904–1907; posthumous J.D., class of 1907) – 32nd president of the United States (1933–1945)
- Theodore Roosevelt (Law 1880–1881; posthumous J.D., class of 1882) – 26th president of the United States (1901–1909), 25th vice president of the United States (1901)

== Cabinet secretaries ==
- Madeleine Albright (Ph.D. 1976, LL.D. [hons.] 1995) – Presidential Medal of Freedom (2012); 64th United States secretary of state under President Bill Clinton (1997–2001), first female secretary of state
- Michael Armacost (Ph.D.) – acting United States secretary of state (1989); U.S. ambassador to Japan (1989–1993); U.S. ambassador to the Philippines (1982–1984)
- Antony Blinken (J.D. 1988) – U.S. deputy national security advisor (2013–2015); 71st United States secretary of state (2021–2025)
- Harold Brown (B.A. 1945, M.A. 1946, Ph.D. 1949) – 14th United States secretary of defense (1977–81)
- Elaine Chao (graduate study) – 24th United States secretary of labor (2001–2009); deputy secretary of labor; former director, Peace Corps
- Bainbridge Colby (J.D. 1891) – 43rd United States secretary of state; founder, 1912 Progressive Party
- Jacob M. Dickinson (Law, attended) – 44th United States secretary of war (1909–1911)
- Hamilton Fish (B.A. 1827) – 26th United States secretary of state (1869–1877)
- Charles Forbes – first director (secretary) of the U.S. Veterans' Bureau (predecessor of the United States Department of Veterans Affairs) (1921–1923)
- James Rudolph Garfield (J.D. 1888) – 23rd United States secretary of the interior (1907–09), United States Civil Service Commission (1902–1903)
- George Graham (B.A. 1790) – United States secretary of war ad interim (1816–1817) under Presidents James Madison and James Monroe
- John Graham (B.A. 1790) – acting United States secretary of state (1817)
- Alexander Haig (CBS 1955) – 59th United States secretary of state in Ronald Reagan's administration
- Alexander Hamilton (1774 matriculated, studies interrupted by Revolutionary War) – first United States secretary of the treasury (1789–1795); co-author of The Federalist Papers
- James Alexander Hamilton (B.A.) – acting United States secretary of state to President Andrew Jackson
- Charles Evans Hughes (J.D. 1884) – 44th United States secretary of state (1921–1925), associate and chief justice of the U.S. Supreme Court
- John Jay (B.A. 1764) – acting United States secretary of state (1789–90); sixth president of the Continental Congress (1778–1779); second U.S. secretary of foreign affairs (1784–89); acting U.S.secretary of foreign affairs (1789); co-author of The Federalist Papers
- Jeh Johnson (J.D.) – secretary of Homeland Security (2013–2017)
- Robert R. Livingston (B.A. 1765) – first U.S.s secretary of foreign affairs (1781–1783)
- Franklin MacVeagh (J.D. 1864) – 45th United States Secretary of the Treasury (1909–13)
- F. David Mathews (Ph.D. 1975) – 11th secretary of United States Department of Health, Education and Welfare under Gerald Ford (1975–1977); president, University of Alabama
- Rogers Morton (VP&S, attended) – special counselor to President Gerald Ford (with cabinet rank); 39th United States secretary of the interior (1971–1975); 22nd United States secretary of commerce (1975–1976); chairman of the Republican National Committee
- Jim Nicholson (M.A.) – 5th United States secretary of veterans affairs (2005–2007) under George W. Bush
- David Pekoske (M.I.A.) – acting U.S. secretary of Homeland Security (2021)
- Frances Perkins (M.A. 1910) – 4th United States secretary of labor (1933–1945), first female cabinet member; United States Civil Service Commission (1946–1953)
- Frank Polk (LL.B. 1897) – acting United States secretary of state (1920); under secretary of state (1919–1920); headed American Commission to Negotiate Peace (1919)
- Maurice H. Stans (1928–30) – 19th United States secretary of commerce (1969–72); director, Office of Management and Budget (cabinet rank) (1958–1961)
- Walter Stoessel (graduate study) – acting United States secretary of state; 7th U.S. deputy secretary of state (February 11, 1982 – September 22, 1982)
- Oscar S. Straus (B.A. 1871, J.D.1873) – 3rd U.S. secretary of commerce and labor (1906–09), the first Jewish presidential cabinet secretary
- William H. Woodin (B.A. 1890) – 51st United States secretary of the treasury under Franklin Roosevelt; directed administration's declaration and enforcement of a "Bank Holiday" and taking U.S. off international gold standard

== Attorneys general ==
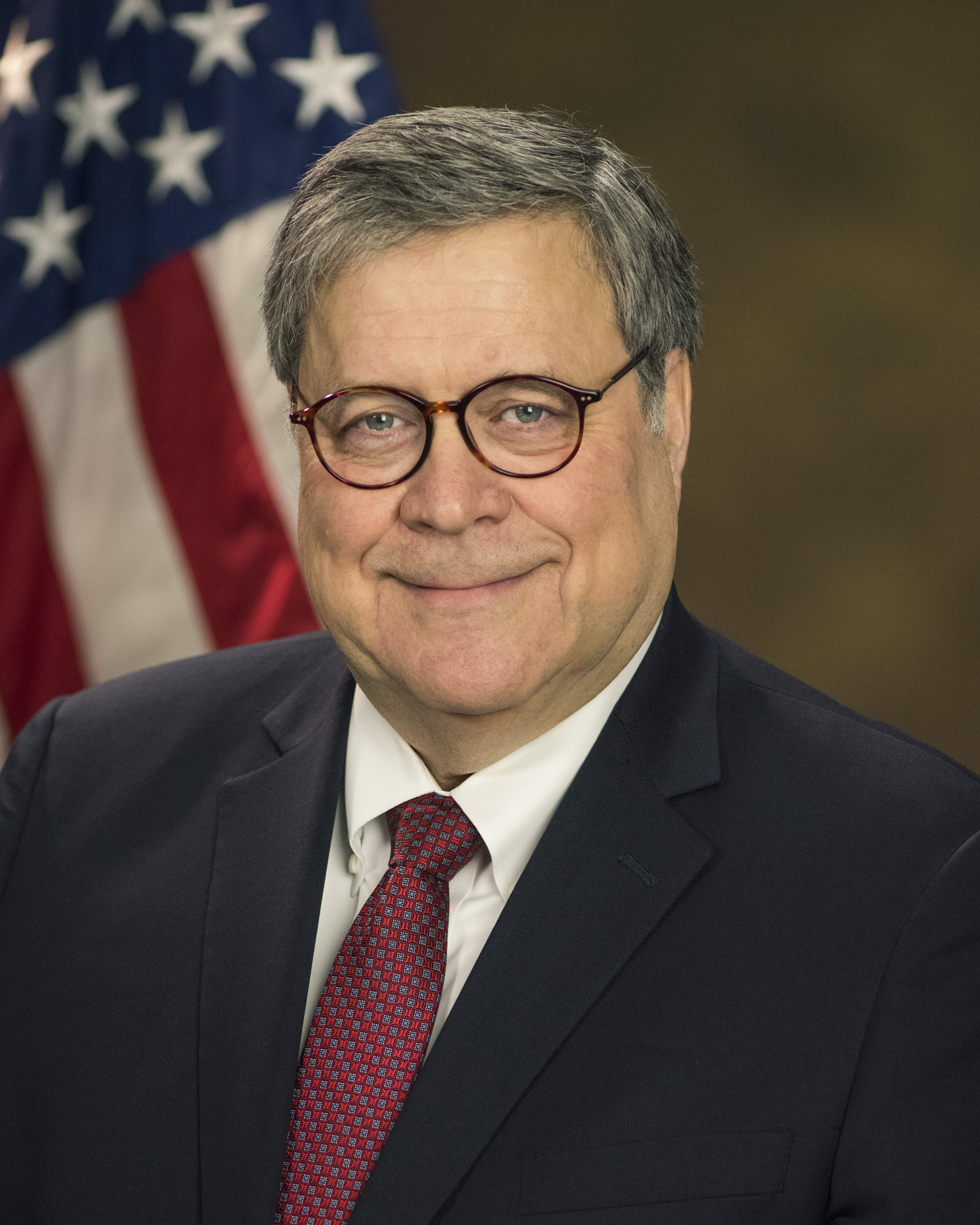
William Barr

- William Pelham Barr (B.A. 1971, M.A. 1973) – 77th and 85th United States attorney general; (1991–1993; 2019–2020); 24th United States deputy attorney general (1990–1991)
- Eric Holder (B.A. 1973, J.D. 1976) – 82nd United States attorney general (2009–2015); first African-American attorney general; former acting U.S. attorney general in Clinton administration (2001); 28th U.S. deputy attorney general (1997–2001); first AG held in criminal and civil contempt of Congress regarding Operation Fast and Furious investigation (2012)
- Joseph McKenna (before taking seat on U.S. Supreme Court, studied at Columbia Law while AG) – 42nd attorney general of the United States (1897–1898)
- Michael Mukasey (B.A. 1963) – 81st United States attorney general (2007–2009), former U.S. district judge and chief judge
- Harlan Fiske Stone (LL.B. 1898) – 52nd United States attorney general (1924–1925); Associate and chief justice of U.S. Supreme Court
- Harold R. Tyler Jr. (J.D. 1949) – 14th United States deputy attorney general (2nd ranking official in the U.S. Department of Justice) (1975–1977)
- Lawrence Edward Walsh (A.B. 1932, LL.B. 1935) – 4th United States deputy attorney general (1957–1960)

== Cabinet-level officers ==
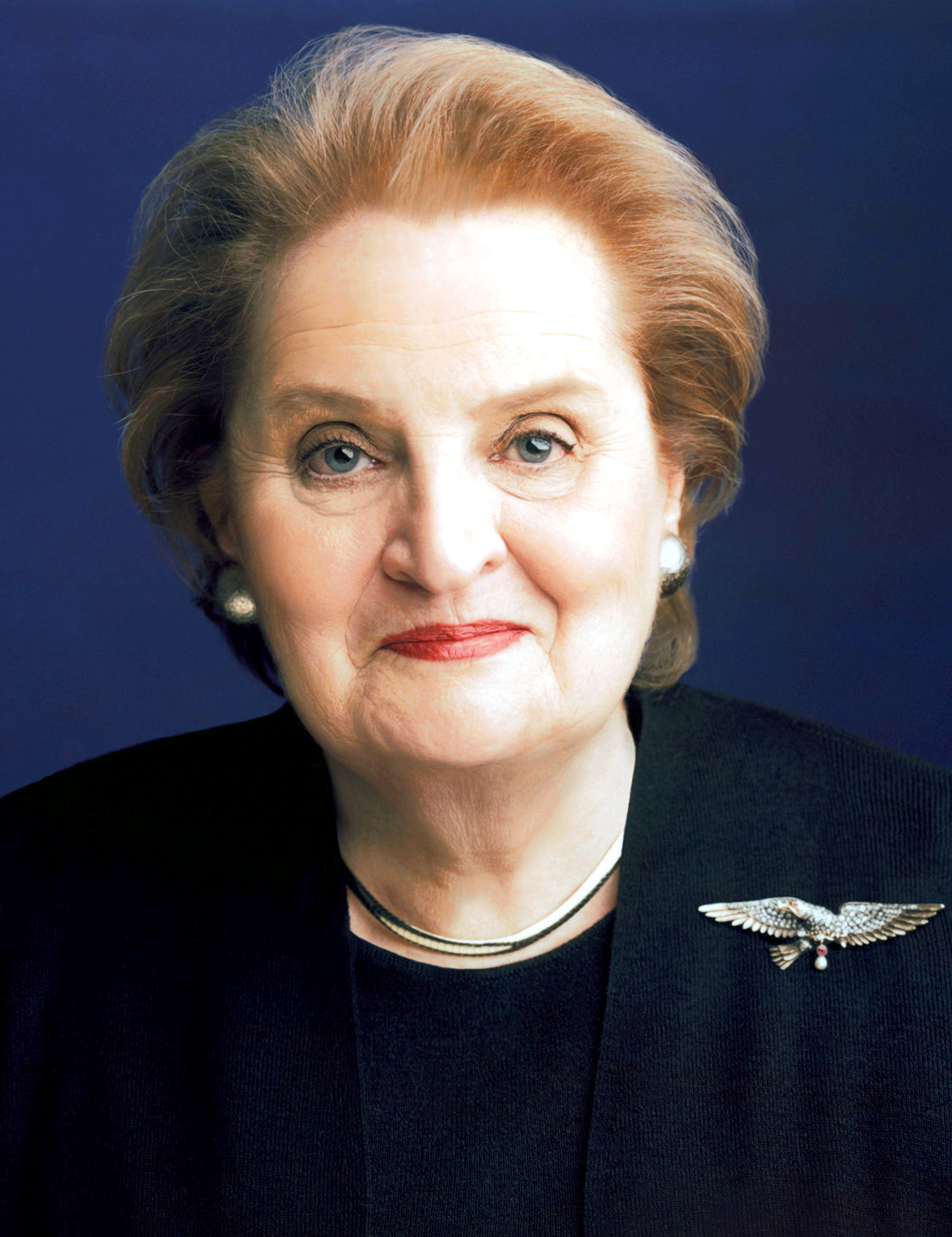
Madeleine Albright

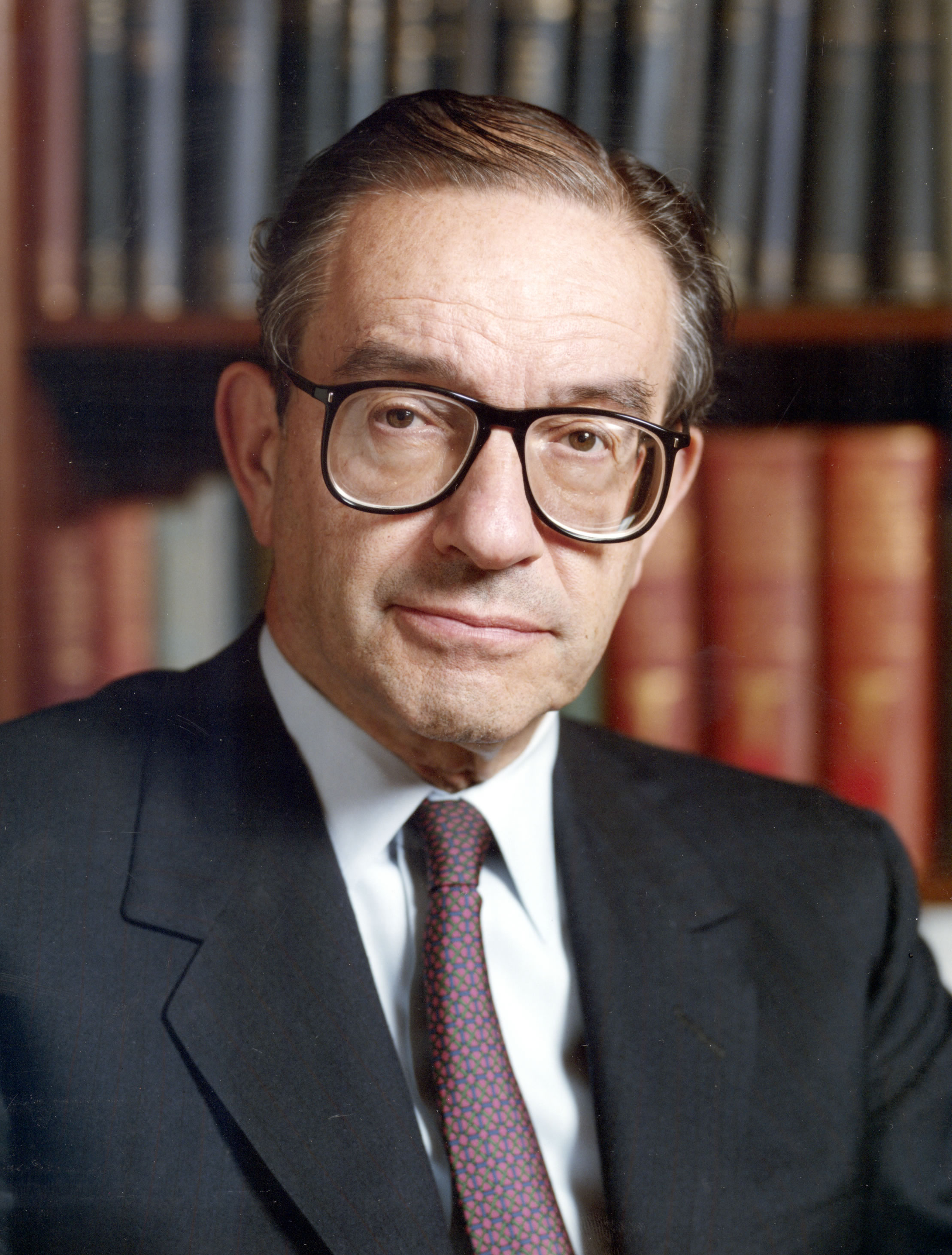
Alan Greenspan

- Madeleine Albright (certificate in Russian language, M.A., Ph.D.) – U.S. ambassador to the United Nations (cabinet rank) (1997–2001); Presidential Medal of Freedom
- Jared Bernstein (Ph.D. 1994) – chairman (2023–), member (2021–), Council of Economic Advisers
- Erskine Bowles (M.B.A.) – former White House Chief of Staff (cabinet rank); administrator of the Small Business Administration (cabinet rank); co-chair, President Barack Obama's National Commission on Fiscal Responsibility and Reform with Alan K. Simpson
- Arthur Frank Burns (B.A. 1925, M.A. 1925, Ph.D. 1934) – Austrian-born U.S. economist; chairman, Council of Economic Advisers (cabinet rank) (1953–56)
- Alan Greenspan (studied for a Ph.D. in economics) – chairman, Council of Economic Advisers (1974–1977); Presidential Medal of Freedom
- Alexander Haig (M.B.A. 1955) – twice White House chief of staff (cabinet rank) under Presidents Richard Nixon and Gerald Ford
- Avril Haines – 7th director of National Intelligence, research scholar and deputy director for the Columbia World Projects
- Fred Hochberg (M.B.A.) – administrator of the Small Business Administration (cabinet rank) (2009–)
- Leon Keyserling (A.B. 1928) – chairman (1950–1953), acting chairman (1949), Council of Economic Advisers under President Harry S. Truman; helped draft major New Deal legislation, including National Industrial Recovery Act, Social Security Act, and the National Labor Relations Act
- Jeane Kirkpatrick (Ph.D. 1968, political science) – U.S. ambassador to the United Nations under Reagan (1981–1985); Presidential Medal of Freedom
- James F. Leonard (1963–64) – U.S. ambassador to the United Nations (1977–1979)
- Arthur M. Okun (B.A., Ph.D.) – chairman (1968–69), member (1964–69), Council of Economic Advisers
- William K. Reilly (M.S. 1971) – 7th administrator, United States Environmental Protection Agency (EPA) (cabinet rank) (1989–93)
- Raymond J. Saulnier (Ph.D. 1938) – chairman (1956–1961), member (1955–1956), Council of Economic Advisers
- Daniel D. Tompkins (B.A. 1795) – 6th vice president of the United States
- Russell E. Train (J.D. 1948) – 2nd administrator, United States Environmental Protection Agency (EPA) (1973–77); chairman, newly formed President's Council on Environmental Quality (1970–73); under secretary, United States Department of the Interior (1967–1970); Presidential Medal of Freedom
- Murray Weidenbaum (M.A.) – chairman, Council of Economic Advisers (1981–1982)

== Directors of Central Intelligence ==
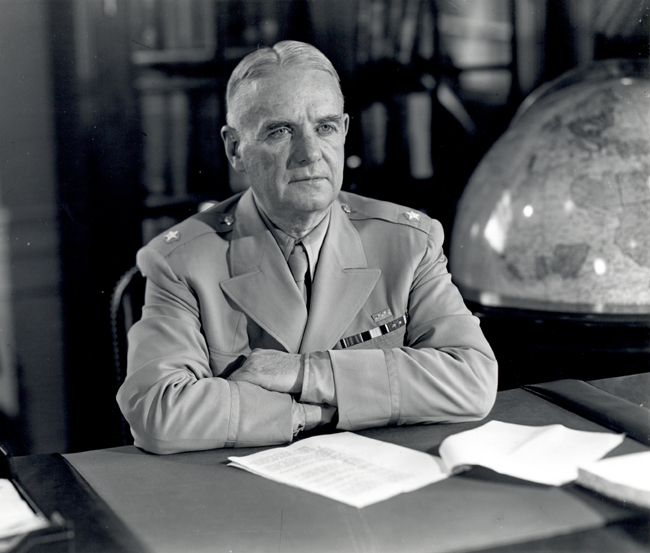
William J. Donovan

- William Colby (LL.B. 1947) – 10th director of Central Intelligence, Central Intelligence Agency (1973–76)
- William J. Donovan (B.A. 1905, J.D. 1908) – known as "father of the Central Intelligence Agency"; founder and first director of the Office of Strategic Services, the predecessor of the CIA
- George Tenet (M.I.A.) – 18th director of Central Intelligence, Central Intelligence Agency (1997–2004)

== White House counsel ==
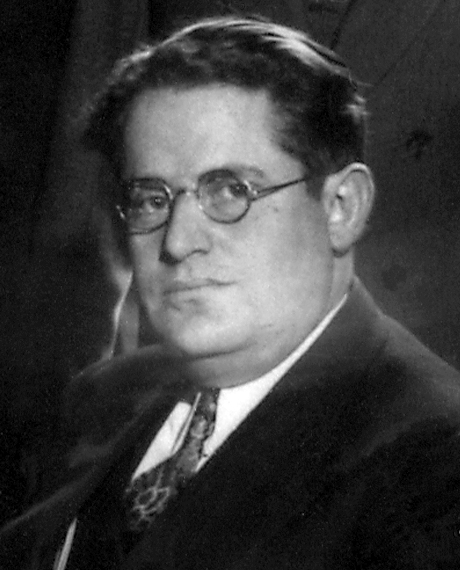
Samuel Rosenman

- Lanny A. Breuer (B.A. 1980, J.D. 1985) – special White House counsel (1997–99); head, Criminal Division, Department of Justice (2009–)
- Robert Delahunty (B.A.) – deputy general counsel, White House Office of Homeland Security (2002–03)
- Joel Klein (B.A.) – deputy White House counsel under President Bill Clinton
- Harry McPherson (1949–1950) – White House counsel and special counsel under President Lyndon Johnson (1963–69)
- Bernard Nussbaum (B.A.) – White House counsel under President Bill Clinton
- David B. Rivkin (J.D.) – legal advisor to White House counsel of then President Reagan; deputy director, White House Office of Policy Development (OPD)
- Samuel Rosenman (J.D. 1919) – first White House counsel (1943–46)
- Charles F.C. Ruff (J.D. 1963) – White House counsel under Bill Clinton; in Watergate scandal, special prosecutor who investigated President Richard Nixon; represented Anita Hill (vs. Clarence Thomas) and Bill Clinton (impeachment)
- Bernard M. Shanley (B.A.) – special counsel, White House (1953–55); White House deputy chief of staff (1955–57)
- Donald B. Verrilli Jr. (J.D.) – deputy White House counsel under President Barack Obama

== Members of the Federal Reserve System ==
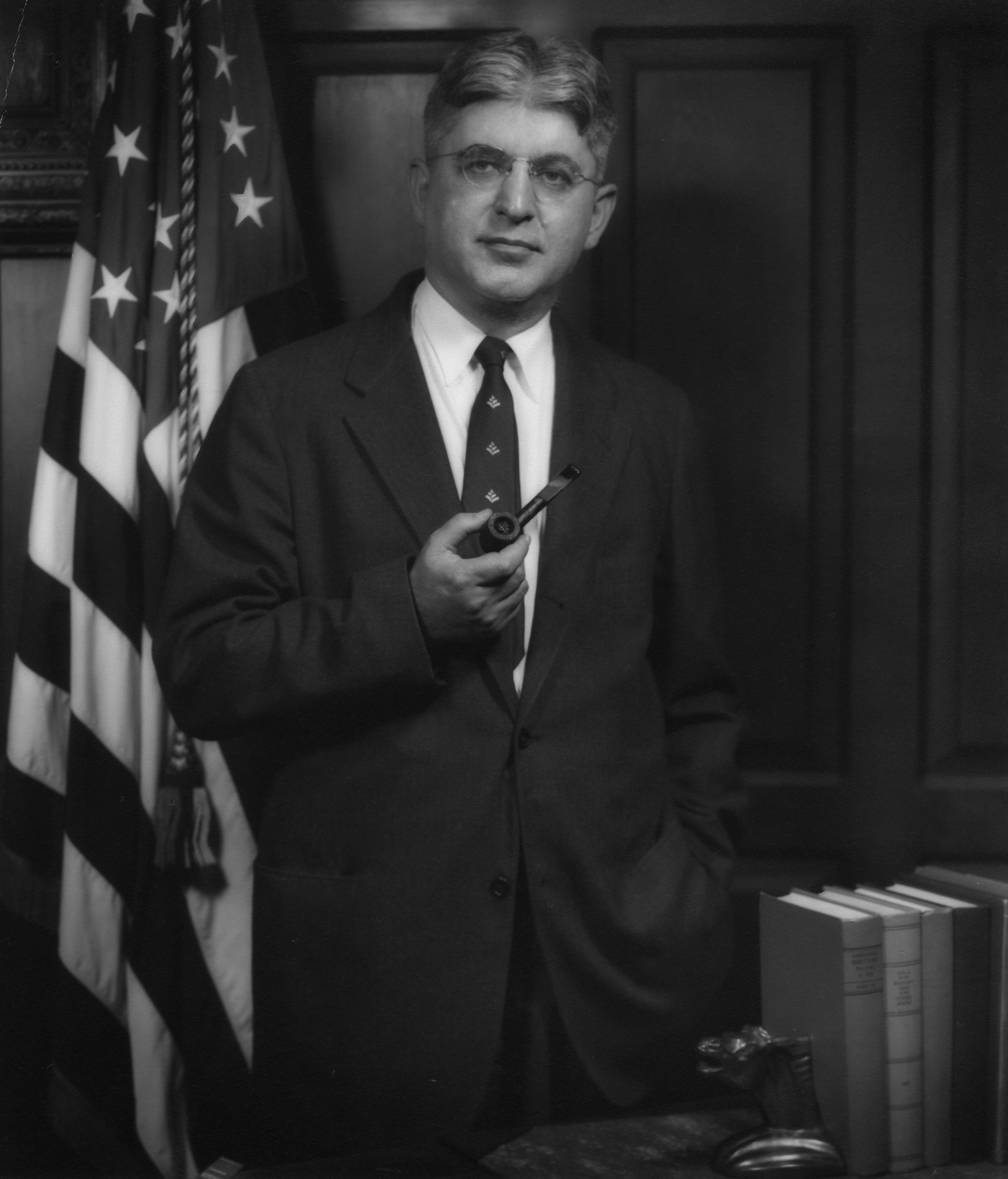
Arthur F. Burns

- Arthur F. Burns (B.A. 1925, M.A. 1925, Ph.D. 1934) – 10th chair of the Federal Reserve (1970–1978)
- Richard Clarida (professor of Economics and International Affairs) – 21st vice chair of the Federal Reserve (2018–2022)
- Alan Greenspan (studied for a Ph.D. in economics) – 13th chair of the Federal Reserve (1987–2006)
- William McChesney Martin (grad. study in economics 1931–37) – 9th chair of the Federal Reserve (1951–1970)
- Randal Quarles (B.A. 1981) – 1st vice chair of the Federal Reserve for Supervision (2017–2021)

== Other presidential advisors ==
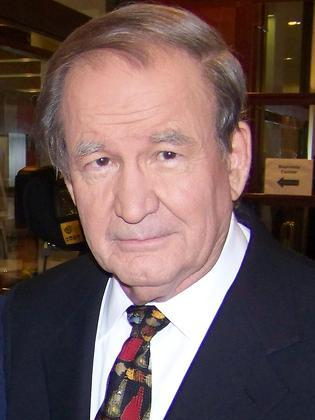
Pat Buchanan

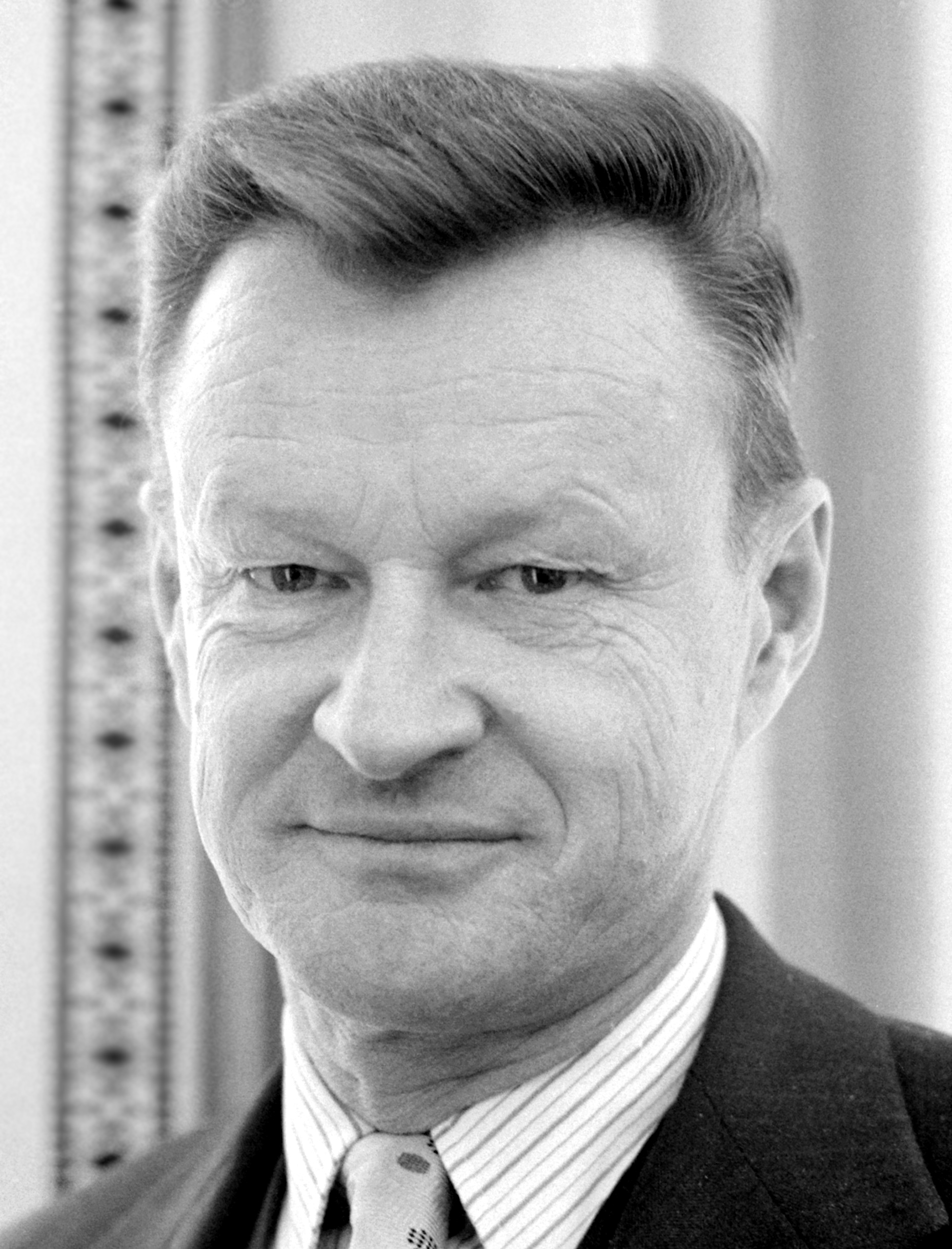
Zbigniew Brzezinski

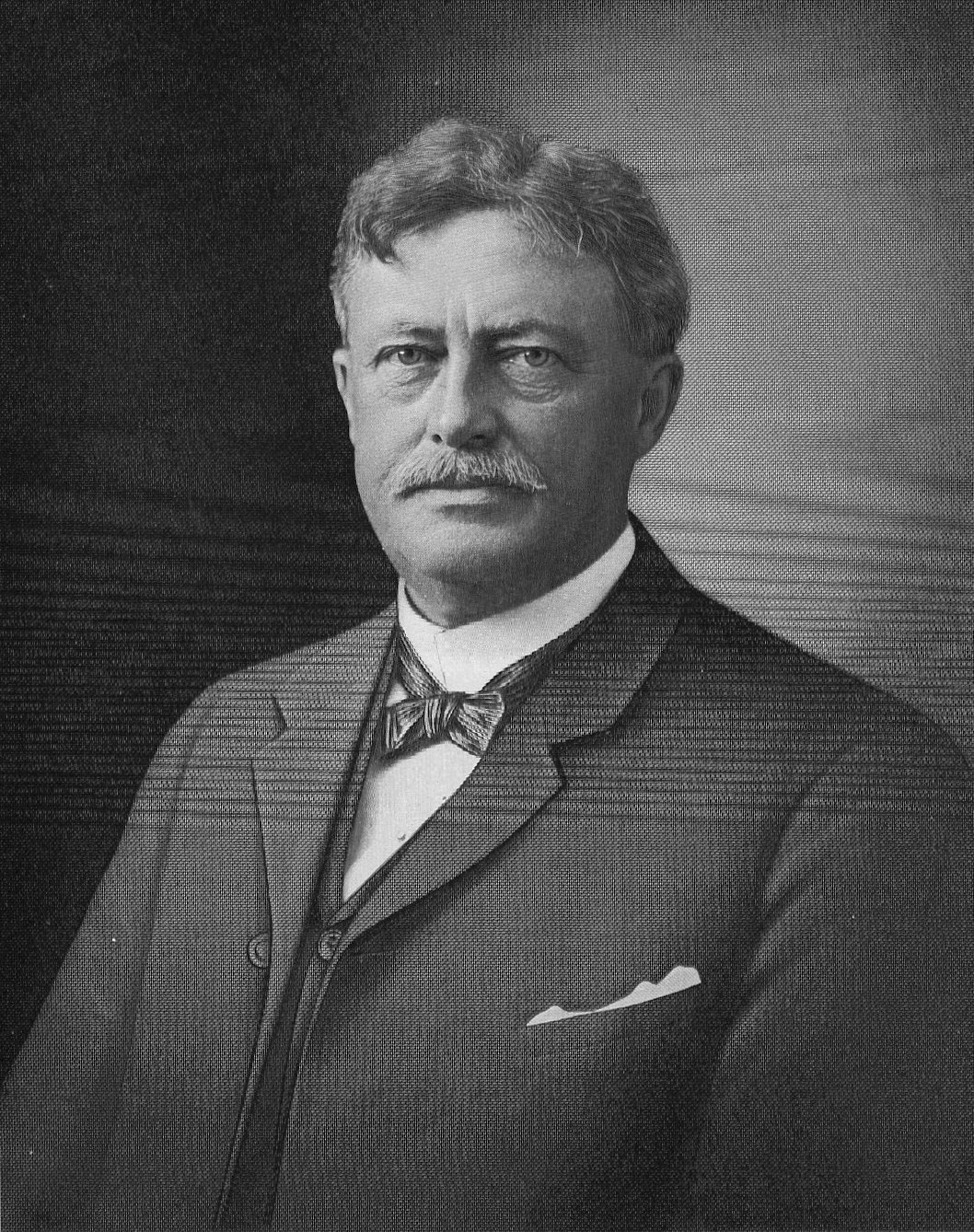
Ulysses S. Grant Jr.

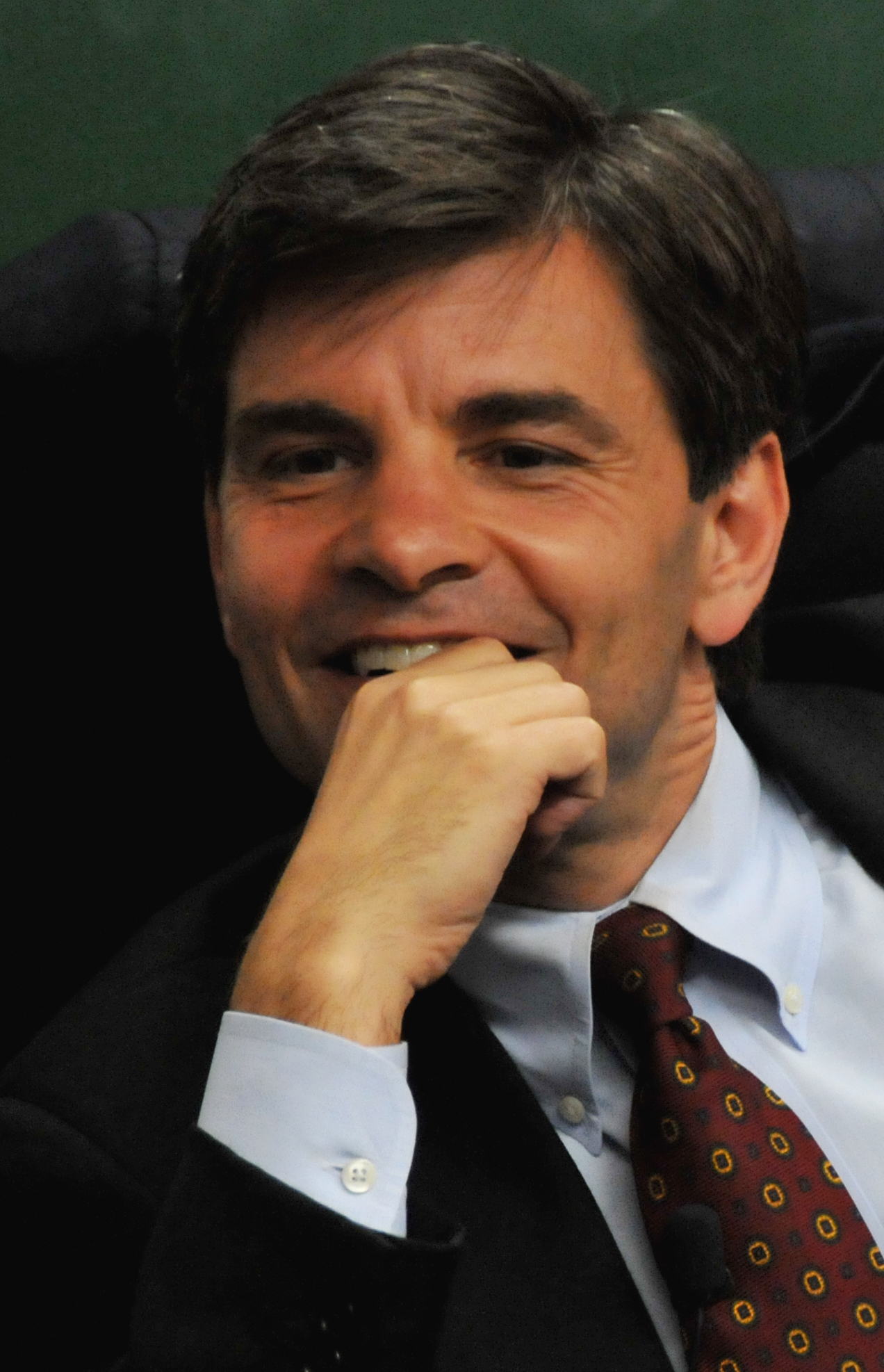
George Stephanopoulos

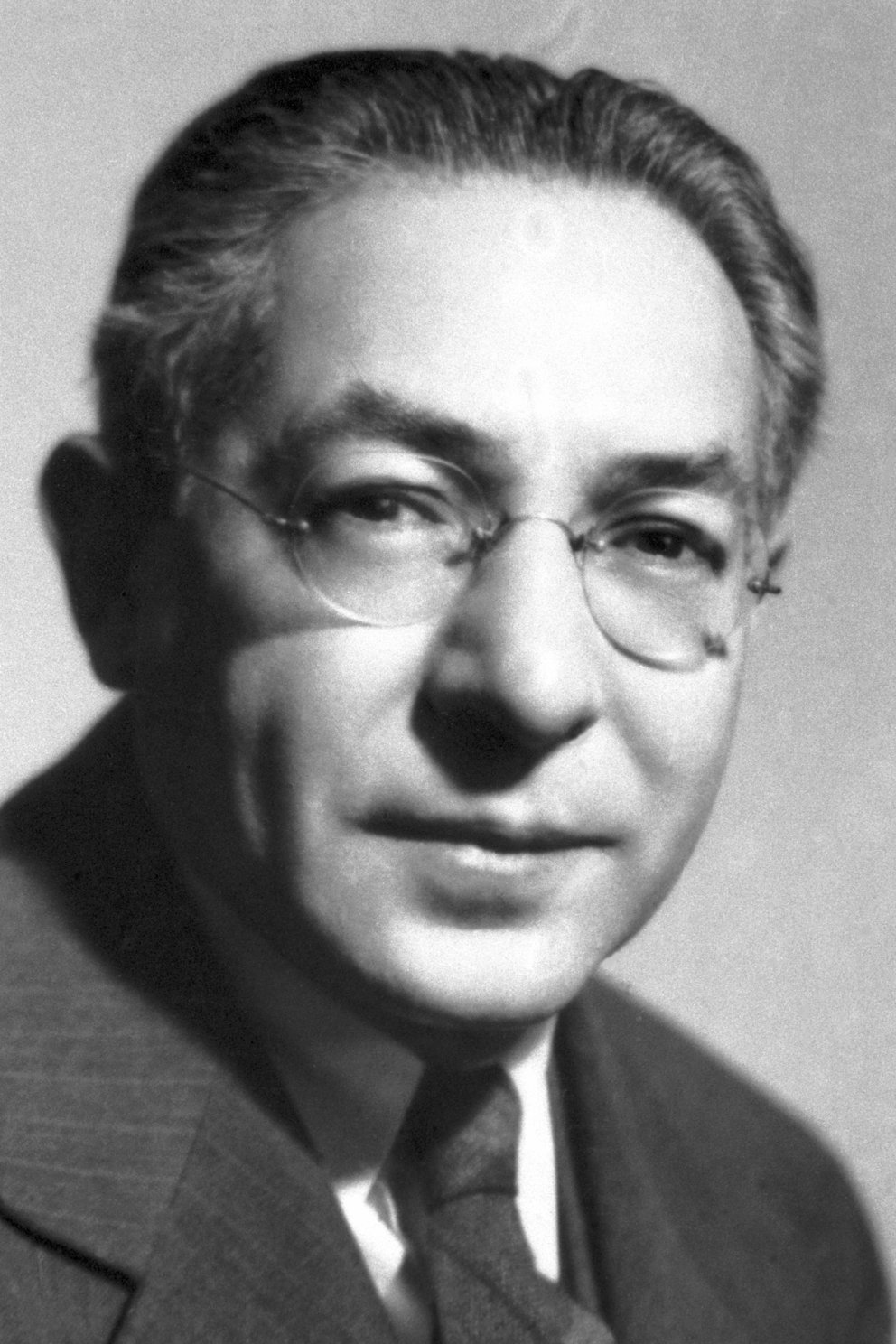
Isidor Isaac Rabi

- Kenneth J. Arrow (M.A., Ph.D.) – Richard Nixon's Council of Economic Advisers
- Mark Barnes (LL.M. 1991) – member, National Health Care Reform Task Force under President Bill Clinton
- Jared Bernstein (M.A., Ph.D. 1994) – member, Presidential Task Force on the Auto Industry; executive director, White House Middle Class Working Families Task Force; chief economist and economic policy advisor to Vice President Joseph Biden in the administration of President Barack Obama (2009–11)
- Zbigniew Brzezinski – 10th national security advisor, professor at Columbia University (1960 – 72)
- Pat Buchanan (M.A. Journalism) – White House communications director (1985 – 1987); coined the phrase "silent majority"; speechwriter for President Nixon and Vice President Spiro Agnew; senior advisor, three U.S. presidents, Richard Nixon, Gerald Ford, and Ronald Reagan
- Ursula Burns (M.S. 1981) – vice-chairman, Obama Administration's Export Council (2010–)
- James E. Connor (B.A. 1961) – White House cabinet secretary and staff secretary to President Gerald Ford
- Jonathan W. Daniels (failed out, CLS) – White House press secretary under Presidents Franklin D. Roosevelt and Harry S. Truman
- Stephen J. Flanagan (B.A. 1973) – senior director for Central and Eastern Europe on the National Security Council (1997–99)
- Daniel Fried (M.I.A. 1977) – special envoy to Guantanamo (2009–); special assistant to the president and member, United States National Security Council (2001–2005)
- Stephen Friedman (J.D. 1962) – director, United States National Economic Council (2002–05); chairman, U.S. President's Foreign Intelligence Advisory Board (2005–09)
- Mark Gallogly (M.B.A. 1986) – Barack Obama's President's Economic Recovery Advisory Board
- Toby Gati (M.A. 1970, M.I.A. 1972) – special assistant to the president and member, United States National Security Council (1993)
- Ulysses S. Grant Jr. (LL.B. 1876) – personal secretary, President Ulysses S. Grant
- M.R.C. Greenwood (postdoctoral study) – associate director for science, White House Office of Science and Technology Policy during the Clinton administration
- Alexander Haig (M.B.A. 1955) – deputy national security advisor (1973–75); vice chief of staff of the Army, the second-highest ranking officer in the Army (1973)
- Fred Hochberg (M.B.A.) – chairman, Export-Import Bank of the United States (2009–)
- Benjamin Huberman (B.A. 1959) – acting science advisor to the president in 1981 and acting director of the Office of Science and Technology Policy
- Carl Kaysen (graduate study, 1940–46) – deputy national security advisor (1961–63)
- Ken Khachigian (J.D. 1969) – speechwriter for President Richard Nixon, chief speechwriter for President Ronald Reagan
- Matt Latimer (M.S.) – special assistant to the president for Speechwriting during the administration of President George W. Bush
- Michael E. Leiter (B.A. 1991) – director of the U.S. National Counterterrorism Center (2007–2011)
- Kenneth Lieberthal (M.A., Ph.D. 1972) – special assistant to the president and senior director, U.S. National Security Council during the Clinton administration
- Harold F. Linder (B.A., Ph.D.) – chairman, Export-Import Bank of the United States (1961–1968), assistant secretary of state for economic and business affairs (1952–53)
- Kathleen McGinty (J.D. 1988) – chair of the Council on Environmental Quality (1995–1998); founding director, White House Office on Environmental Policy
- Charles Edward Merriam (M.A. 1897, Ph.D., political science, 1900) – advisor to several presidents, including Franklin D. Roosevelt
- Raymond Moley (Ph.D. 1918) – Presidential Medal of Freedom (1970); senior adviser, Franklin D. Roosevelt; a leading New Dealer; leading member of first Brain Trust; recruited its members from Columbia faculty; later became sharp critic of New Deal
- Dick Morris (B.A. 1967) – chief political advisor to President Bill Clinton in his first term; first use of term triangulation
- William Eldridge Odom (M.S. 1962, Ph.D. 1970) – former director of the National Security Agency (NSA) under President Ronald Reagan
- Michel Oksenberg (M.A. 1963, Ph.D. 1969) – member, United States National Security Council; closely involved in normalization of U.S.-China relations undertaken during the administration of President Jimmy Carter
- Frank Press (M.A. 1946, Ph.D. 1949) – science advisor to President Jimmy Carter; director, White House Office of Science and Technology Policy (1976–1980)
- Isidor Isaac Rabi (Ph.D.) – science advisor to President Eisenhower and director, White House Office of Science and Technology Policy (1956–1957)
- Lynn Forester de Rothschild (J.D. 1980) – United States secretary of energy advisory board under President Bill Clinton
- Brent Scowcroft (M.A., Ph.D.) – 9th & 17th United States National Security Advisor (1975–77; 1989–93); chairman, U.S. President's Foreign Intelligence Advisory Board (2001–05); deputy national security advisor (1970–75)
- Paul Seabury (Ph.D.) – U.S. President's Foreign Intelligence Advisory Board; 1964 Bancroft Prize
- Gary Sick (Ph.D. 1973) – U.S. National Security Council under Presidents Ford, Carter, and Reagan; principal White House aide for Persian Gulf affairs (1976–1981) (including Iranian revolution and the hostage crisis)
- Steven Simon (B.A. 1974) – senior director for the Middle East and North Africa on the National Security Council (1997–99)
- Ben Stein (B.A. 1966) – speechwriter and lawyer for President Richard Nixon and later for President Gerald Ford
- George Stephanopoulos (B.A., salutatorian, 1982) – initially de facto White House press secretary, later senior advisor to President Bill Clinton
- Robert Suettinger (M.A.) – President Bill Clinton's national intelligence officer for East Asia at the National Intelligence Council (1997–1998)
- Rexford Tugwell (Ph.D.) – part of Franklin D. Roosevelt's first "Brain Trust", and was one of the chief intellectual contributors to his New Deal
- Harold E. Varmus (M.D.) – one of three co-chairs, President's Council of Advisors on Science and Technology (2009–)
- Michael Waldman (B.A. 1982) – director of speechwriting for President Clinton (1995–99), member of the Presidential Commission on the Supreme Court of the United States
- Paul Weinstein (M.A.) – special assistant to the president and chief of staff, White House Domestic Policy Council during the Clinton administration
- Harry Dexter White (attended 1922) – senior treasury official for Franklin D. Roosevelt, helped found World Bank and International Monetary Fund (IMF); alleged in Venona list to be Soviet spy
- Marina von Neumann Whitman (M.A. 1959, Ph.D. 1962) – member, Richard Nixon's Council of Economic Advisers (1973–74)
- Samuel V. Wilson (attended) – former director of the Defense Intelligence Agency; coined the term "counterinsurgency"
- Tim Wu – special assistant to the president for technology and competition policy, professor at Columbia University (2006 – )

== Commissioners and agency heads, sub-cabinet members ==
- Karan K. Bhatia (J.D. 1993) – deputy United States Trade Representative (2nd ranking official in the U.S. Office of Trade Representative) (2005–)
- Frank Blake (J.D. 1976) – deputy United States secretary of energy (2nd ranking official in the U.S. Department of Energy)
- Sharon Block (B.A. 1987) – acting administrator of the Office of Information and Regulatory Affairs (2021–), member of the National Labor Relations Board (2012–13)
- Amit Bose (B.A. 1994) – acting administrator of the Federal Railroad Administration
- Harold Brown (B.A. 1945, M.A. 1946, Ph.D. 1949) – 8th U.S. secretary of the Air Force (1965–69)
- Julie Chung (M.I.A. 1996) – acting assistant secretary of state for Western Hemisphere affairs (2021–), U.S. ambassador to Sri Lanka and the Maldives nominee
- L. Francis Cissna (M.I.A. 1990) – director of the United States Citizenship and Immigration Services (2017–19)
- Reuben Clark (LL.B. 1906) – under secretary of state (1919–1972, 2nd ranking official in the U.S. Department of State)
- Alan D. Cohn (B.A. 1993) – assistant secretary for Strategy, Plans, Analysis and Risk, U.S. Department of Homeland Security
- John Collier (B.A. 1906) – U.S. commissioner of Indian affairs (1933–1945), implemented reform of federal Indian policy
- Monica Crowley (Ph.D.) – assistant secretary for public affairs of the U.S. Department of the Treasury (2019–21)
- Thibaut de Saint Phalle (B.A. 1939) – director of the Export–Import Bank of the United States (1977–1981)
- Carol A. DiBattiste (LL.M. 1986) – former U.S. under secretary of the Air Force (2nd highest civilian official in the U.S. Department of the Air Force) (1999–2001)
- William O. Douglas (LL.B. 1925) – third chairman, United States Securities and Exchange Commission (1936–39)
- Nathan Feinsinger (Law, post-graduate study) – former chairman, United States Wage Stabilization Board
- Joseph F. Finnegan (B.A. 1928) – fourth director, Federal Mediation and Conciliation Service (1955–1961)
- William Dudley Foulke (B.A. 1869, LL.B. 1871) – commissioner, United States Civil Service Commission
- Charles Frankel (B.A. 1937) – assistant secretary of state for educational and cultural affairs (1965–67)
- Tom Frieden (M.D., M.P.H.) – director, Centers for Disease Control and Prevention (CDC) (2009–2017); administrator, Agency for Toxic Substances and Disease Registry (2009–2017)
- Robert A. Frosch (B.A., M.A., Ph.D.) – fifth administrator, National Aeronautics and Space Administration (NASA) (1977–81), Assistant Secretary of the Navy (Research and Development)
- Julius Genachowski (B.A. 1985) – chairman, United States Federal Communications Commission (FCC) (2009–13)
- Harvey Goldschmid (B.A. 1965) – commissioner (2002–05), and previously general counsel, special adviser to chairman, United States Securities and Exchange Commission
- Henry Clay Hall (LL.B. 1883) – twice chairman (1917–1918, 1924), commissioner (1914–1928), Interstate Commerce Commission
- Eric Hargan (J.D.) – acting deputy secretary, United States Department of Health and Human Services under President George W. Bush
- Robert O. Harris (B.A. 1951) – twice chairman of the National Mediation Board (1979–80, 1982–83)
- John D. Hawke Jr. (J.D. 1960) – United States Comptroller of the Currency (1998–2004); Under Secretary of the Treasury for Domestic Finance (1995–1998)
- Joseph Hendrie (Ph.D. 1957) – former chairman, U.S. Nuclear Regulatory Commission
- Edward Hidalgo (J.D. 1936) – Secretary of the Air Force (1979–1981); Assistant Secretary of the Navy (Manpower and Reserve Affairs) (1977–1979)
- John H. Hilldring (attended 1914–1916) – Assistant Secretary of State for Occupied Areas (1946–47)
- John C. Inglis (M.S. Mech. Eng. 1977) – former deputy director, National Security Agency (2006–2014)
- Robert Joseph (Ph.D. 1978) – under secretary of state for arms control and international security (2005–2007)
- Colin Kahl (Ph.D. 2000) – under secretary of defense for policy (2021–), national security advisor to the vice president (2014–17)
- Robert Karem (B.A. 2000) – acting under secretary of defense for policy (2017) assistant secretary of defense for international security affairs (2017–2018)
- Lina Khan – chairwoman (2021–), Federal Trade Commission; professor at Columbia Law School
- William Kovacic (J.D. 1978) – chairman (2008–2009), commissioner (2006–2009), Federal Trade Commission
- Madeleine Kunin (M.A.) – U.S. deputy secretary of education (2nd ranking official in the U.S. Department of Education) (1993–1997)
- Michael E. Leiter (B.A. 1991) – director, U.S. National Counterterrorism Center (NCTC), during capture of Osama bin Laden (2007–)
- Irving Lewis "Scooter" Libby (J.D. 1975) – chief of staff, Vice President Dick Cheney (2001–05); convicted on obstruction of justice charges for his role in Plame affair (2007)
- Nancy McEldowney (M.I.A. 1986) – national security advisor to the vice president (2021–)
- Allan I. Mendelowitz (B.A. 1966) – chairman of the Federal Housing Finance Board (2000–01)
- Charles E. F. Millard (J.D. 1985) – director, U.S. Pension Benefit Guaranty Corporation (2007–09)
- John Bassett Moore – U.S. assistant secretary of state (1898), Columbia professor (1891–1924)
- Richard M. Moose (M.A. 1954) – assistant secretary of state for African affairs (1977–81), under secretary of state for management (1992–96)
- Geoff Morrell (M.S. 1992) – press secretary for the US Department of Defense (2007–11)
- Michael Mundaca (B.A. 1986) – assistant secretary for tax policy in the U.S. Department of the Treasury (2010–11)
- Brian Murphy (M.A. 2006) – acting under secretary of Homeland Security for intelligence and analysis (2018–20)
- Annette Nazareth (J.D. 1981) – commissioner, United States Securities and Exchange Commission (2005–08)
- James T. O'Connell (B.A. 1928) – U.S. deputy secretary of labor (1957–1962)
- Myrna Pérez (J.D. 2003) – nominee, commissioner, Election Assistance Commission (2011–)
- Robert Pitofsky (LL.B. 1954) – chairman (1995–2001), commissioner (1978–81), Federal Trade Commission
- Donald A. Quarles (graduate studies) – secretary of the Air Force; deputy secretary of defense (2nd ranking official in the Department of Defense)
- Randal Quarles (B.A. 1981) – under secretary of the treasury for domestic finance (2005–2006), vice chair of the Federal Reserve (2017–)
- Karthik Ramanathan (B.A. 1994) – assistant secretary of the treasury for financial markets (2008–2010)
- Steven Reich (B.A. 1983) – associate deputy attorney general (2011–2013)
- Philippe Reines (B.A. 2000) – deputy assistant secretary for strategic communications in the United States Department of State
- James J. Reynolds (B.A. 1928) – U.S. deputy secretary of labor (1967–1969)
- George Lockhart Rives (B.A. 1868, LL.B.1873) – U.S. assistant secretary of state (1853–1913, 2nd ranking official in the U.S. Department of State) (1887–89)
- Franklin Delano Roosevelt (Law 1904–1907; posthumous J.D., class of 1907) – U.S. assistant secretary of the Navy (1861–1954, second highest civilian office in Department of the Navy, reporting to U.S. secretary of the Navy, who until 1947 was a member of the president's cabinet)
- Theodore Roosevelt (Law 1880–1881; posthumous J.D., class of 1882) – U.S. assistant secretary of the Navy
- David Rothkopf (B.A. 1977) – acting under secretary of commerce for international trade (1995–96)
- Louis M. Rousselot (B.A. 1923) – assistant secretary of defense for health affairs (1970–71)
- James P. Rubin (B.A. 1982, M.A. 1984) – chief spokesperson for the State Department, considered Secretary Albright's right-hand man in Clinton administration; U.S. assistant secretary of state for public affairs (1997–2000)
- William Cary Sanger (LL.B. 1878) – U.S. assistant secretary of war (1901–03)
- Andrew J. Shapiro (J.D. 1994) – assistant secretary of state for political-military affairs (2009–2013)
- William H. Shaw (B.A. 1930) – assistant secretary of commerce for Economic Affairs (1966–68)
- Justin Shubow (B.A. 1999) – chairman (2021) and member of the United States Commission of Fine Arts (2018–21)
- William E. Simkin (graduate studies) – fifth director, Federal Mediation and Conciliation Service, longest-serving director (1961–1969)
- Eve Slater (M.D. 1971) – U.S. assistant secretary for health and human services (2002–2003)
- Joan E. Spero (M.A. 1968, Ph.D. 1973) – under secretary of state for economic growth, energy, and the environment (1993–97)
- John J. Sullivan (J.D. 1985) – U.S. deputy secretary of commerce (2008–2009), U.S. deputy secretary of state (2017–19)
- Mozelle Thompson (B.A. 1976, J.D. 1981) – commissioner, Federal Trade Commission (1997–2004)
- Gardiner L. Tucker (B.A. 1947) – assistant secretary for systems analysis (1970–73), assistant secretary general of NATO for defense support (1973–76)
- Arturo Valenzuela (Ph.D. 1971) – assistant secretary of state for Western Hemisphere affairs (2009–11)
- Harold Varmus (M.D.) – director, National Cancer Institute (2010–) – director, National Institutes of Health (1993–99); Nobel laureate
- Tracy Voorhees (J.D. 1915) – under secretary of the United States Army (2nd ranking official in the U.S. Army) (1949–50)
- J. Mayhew Wainwright (B.A. 1884, J.D. 1886) – U.S. assistant secretary of war (2nd ranking official in the U.S. Department of War until 1940) (1921–23)
- Ronald Weich (B.A. 1980) – United States assistant attorney general for the Office of Legislative Affairs
- Mary Jo White (J.D. 1974) – chairman (2013–), commissioner (2013–), United States Securities and Exchange Commission
- Felix Wormser (B.S. 1916) – assistant secretary of the interior for mineral resources (1954–57)
- Dov Zakheim (B.A. 1970) – under secretary of defense (comptroller) (2001–04), signatory to manifesto Rebuilding America's Defenses (2000) of the Project for the New American Century

== Solicitors general ==
- Lloyd Wheaton Bowers (J.D.) – United States solicitor general (1909–1910)
- Charles Fried (J.D.) – U.S. solicitor general (1985–1989); acting solicitor general; deputy solicitor general
- Daniel M. Friedman (A.B., J.D.) – acting U.S. solicitor general (1977); first deputy solicitor general
- R. Kent Greenawalt (J.D.) – deputy U.S. solicitor general (1971–1972)
- Stanley Foreman Reed (J.D.) – U.S. solicitor general (1935–1938)
- Donald Verrilli Jr. (J.D.) – U.S. solicitor general (2011–2016); United States deputy attorney general; deputy counsel to the president

== Judges ==
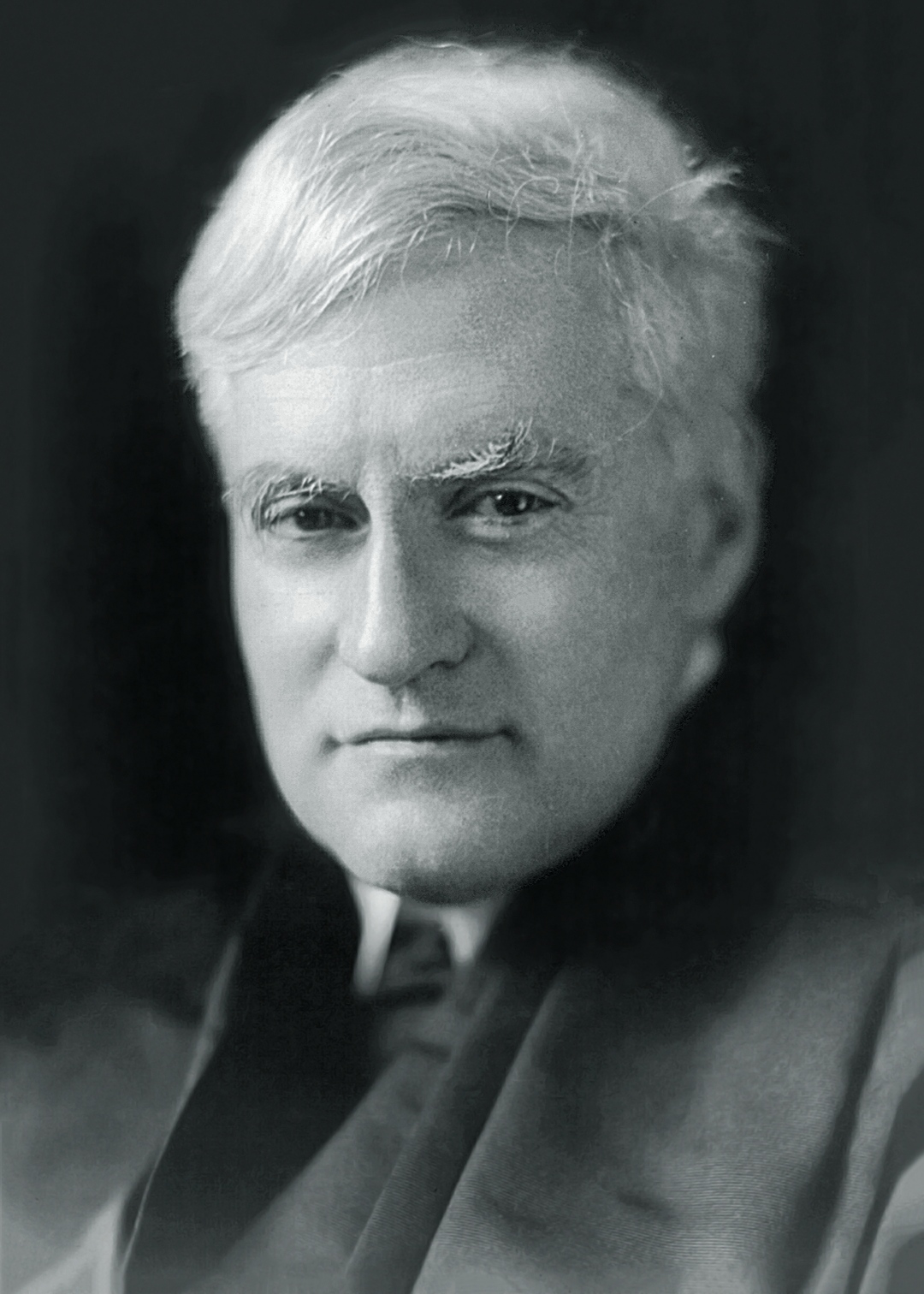
Benjamin N. Cardozo

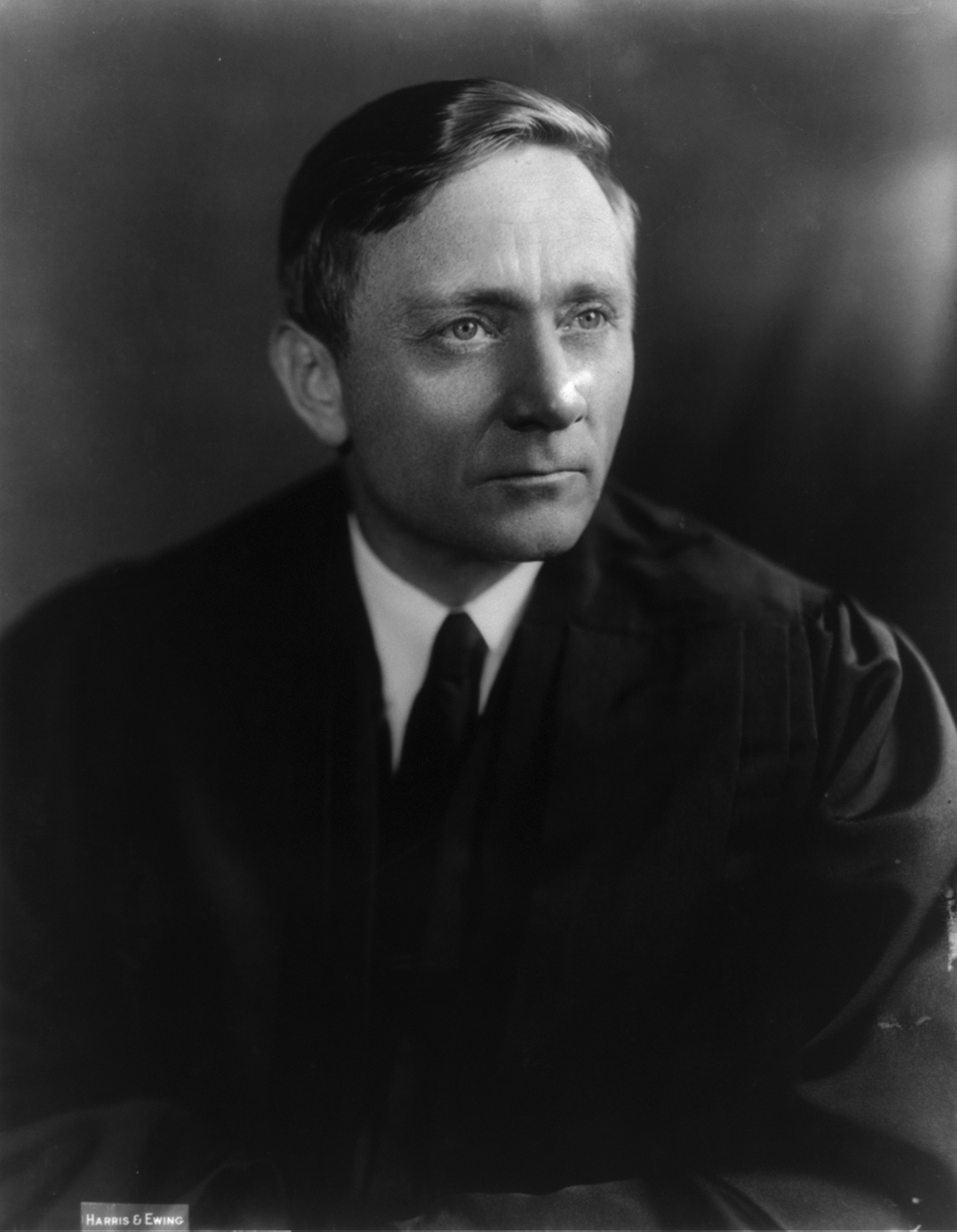
William O. Douglas

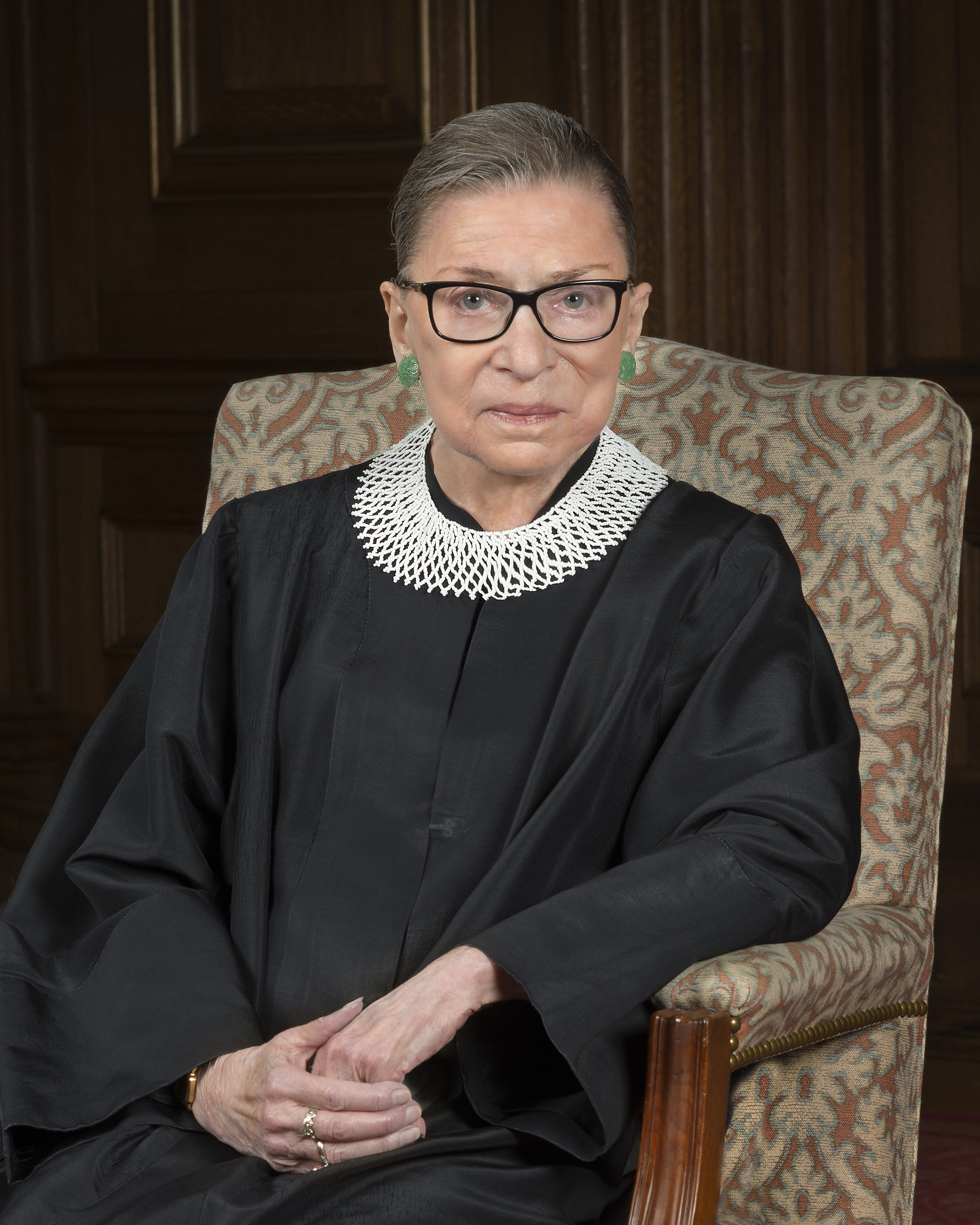
Ruth Bader Ginsburg

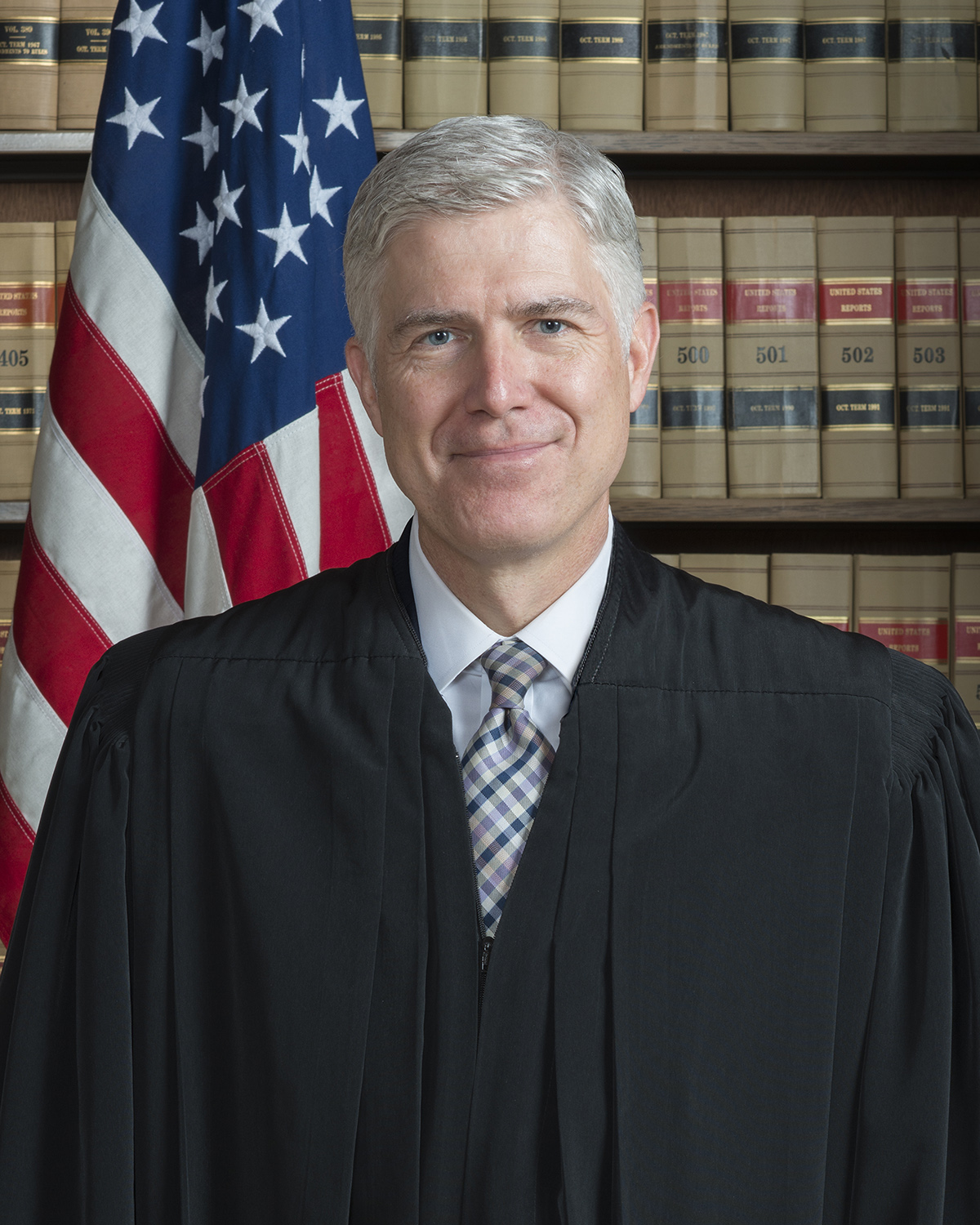
Neil Gorsuch

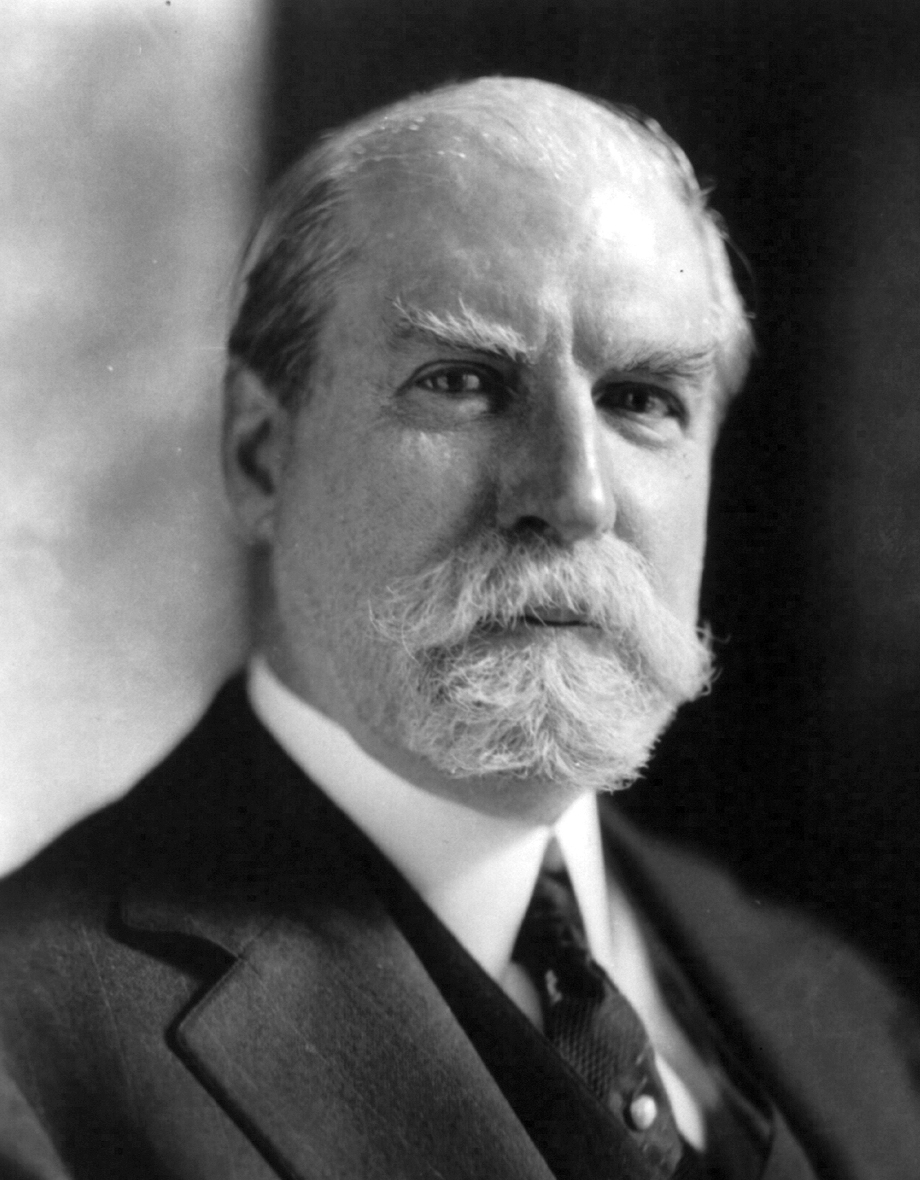
Charles Evans Hughes

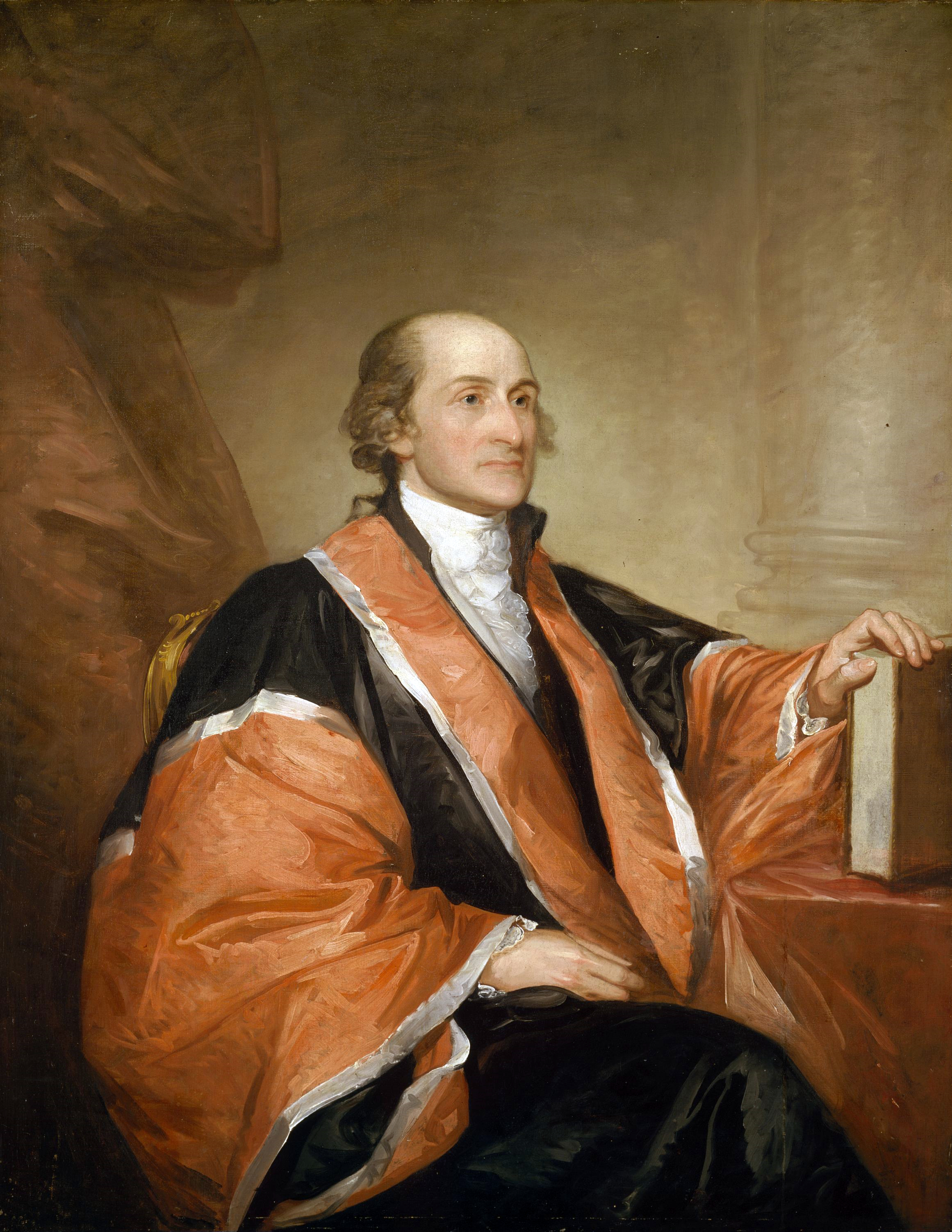
John Jay

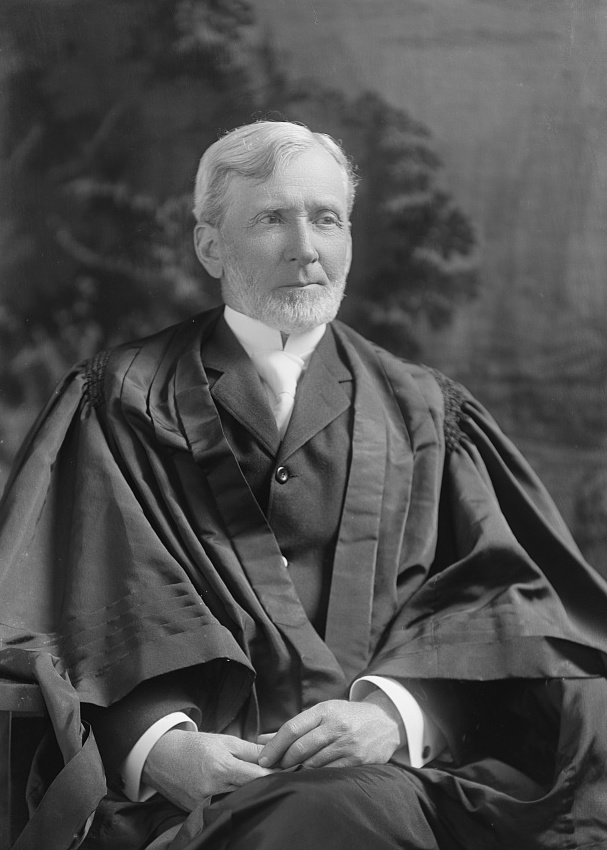
Joseph McKenna

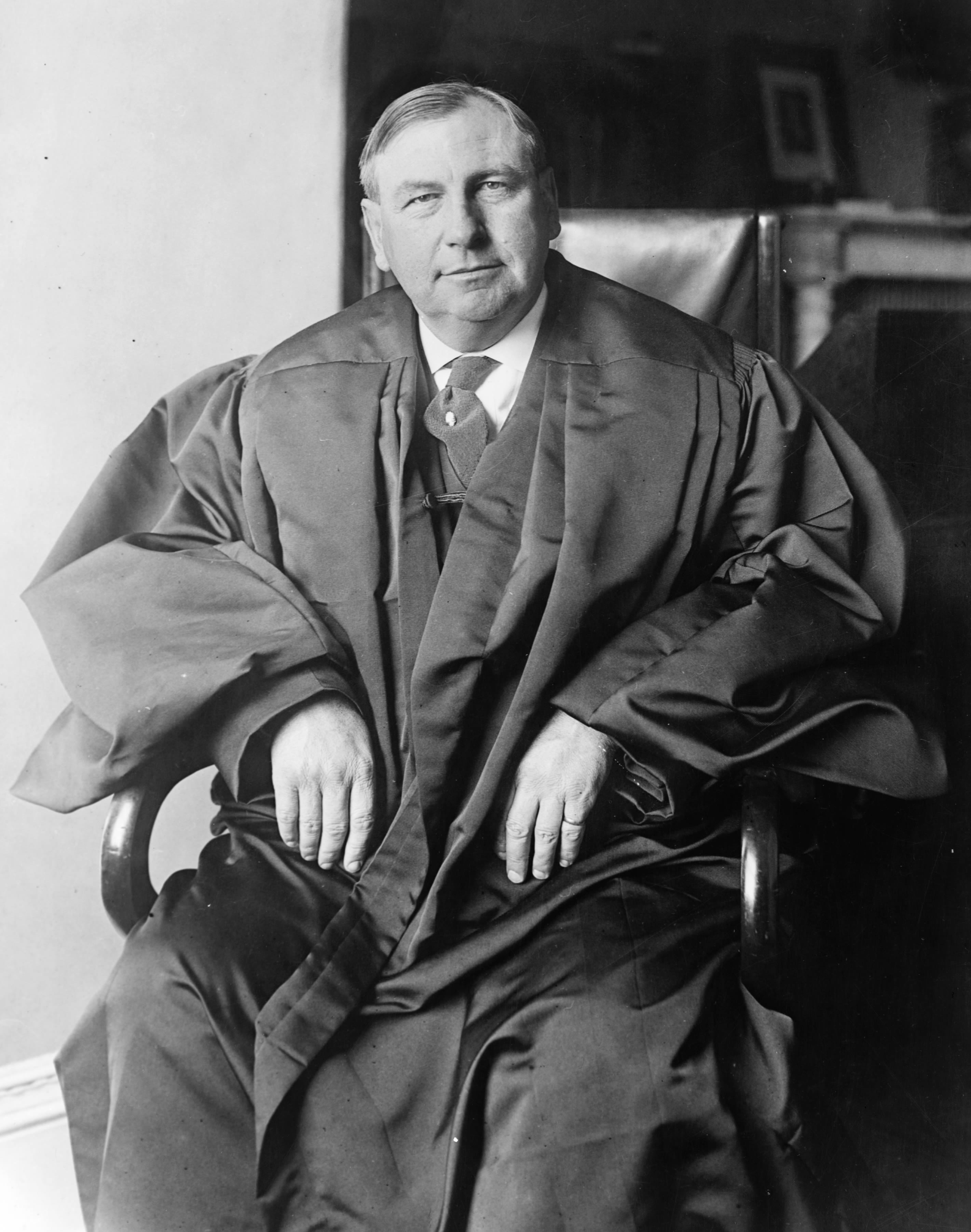
Harlan F. Stone

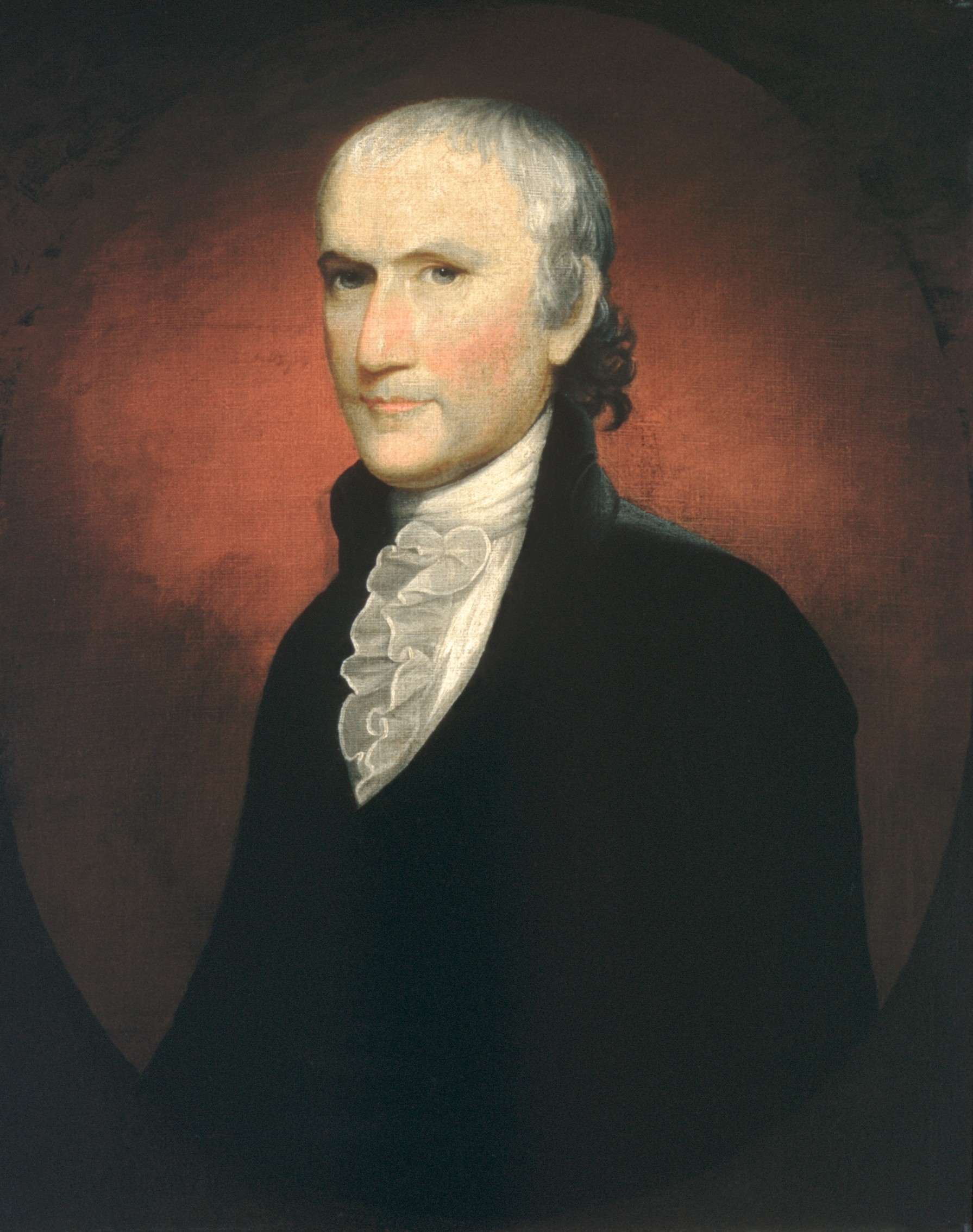
Egbert Benson

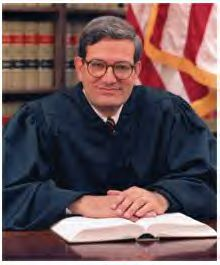
José A. Cabranes

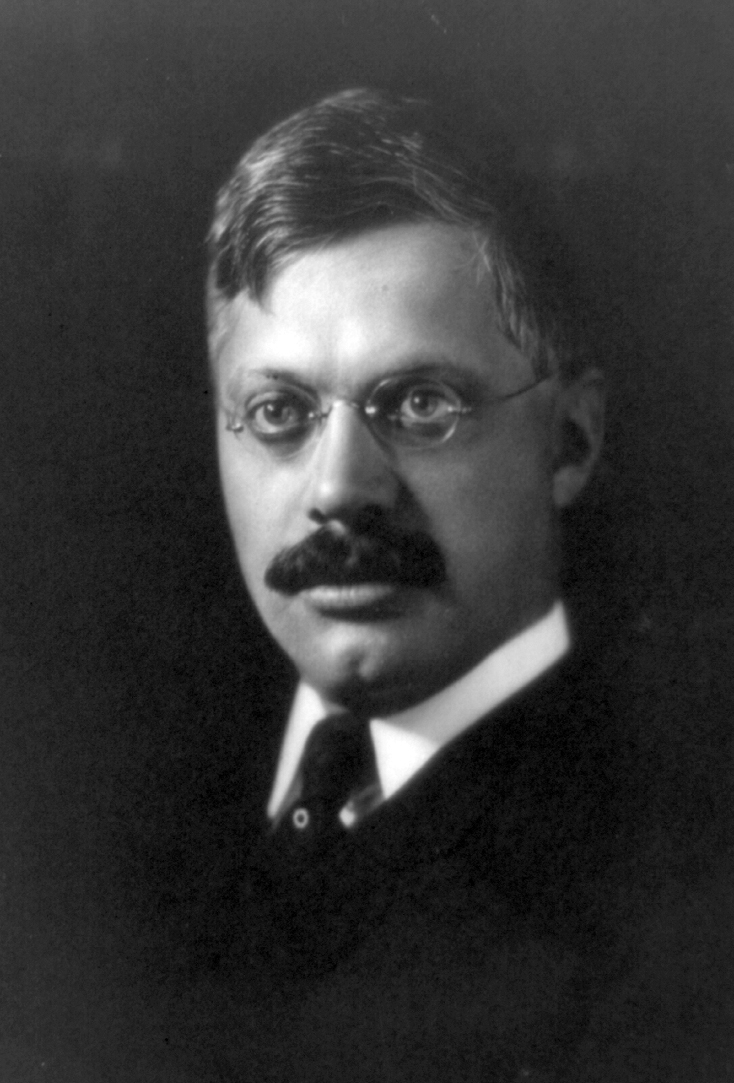
Julius Marshuetz Mayer

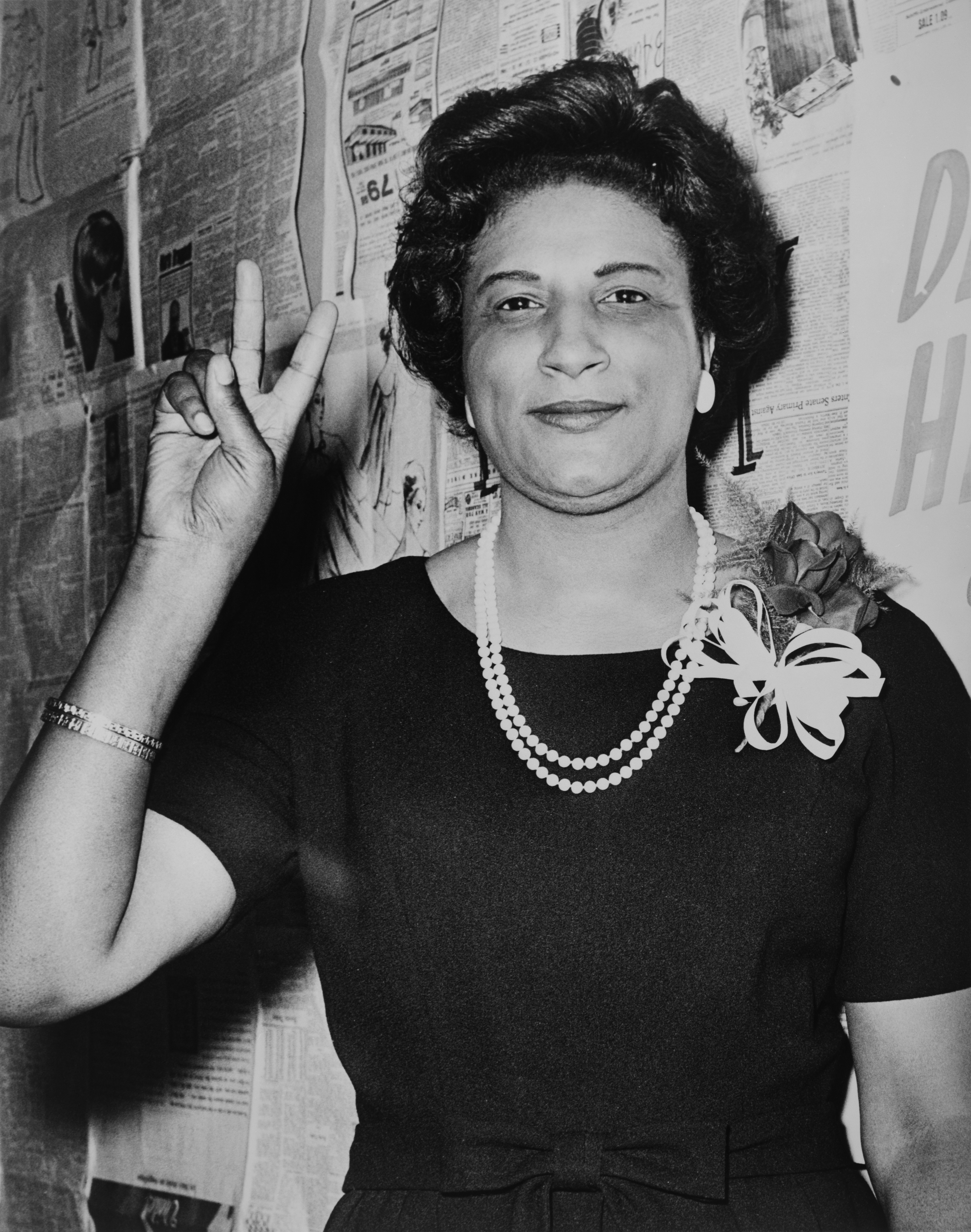
Constance Baker Motley

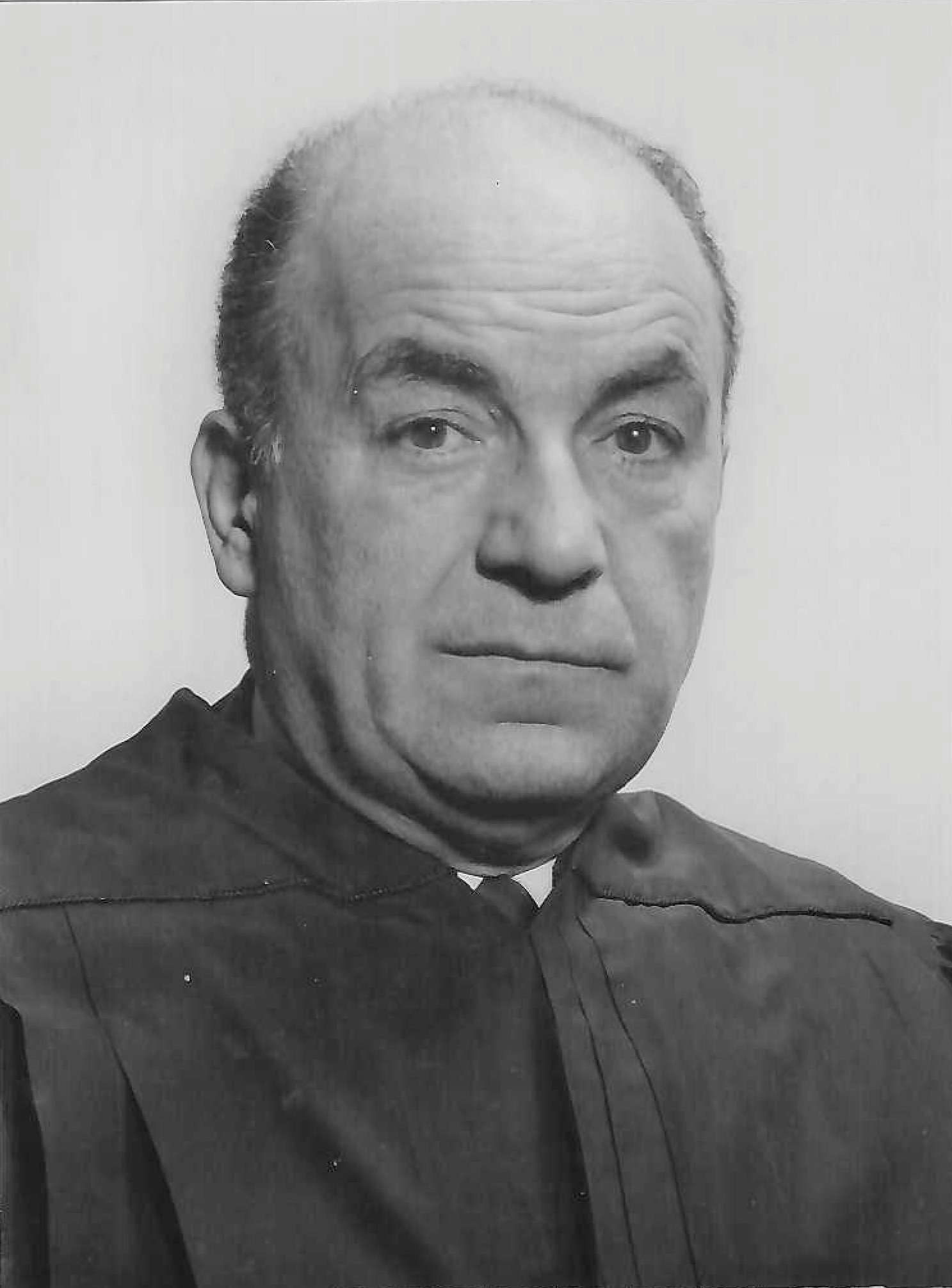
Edmund Louis Palmieri

=== Supreme Court justices ===
- Samuel Blatchford (B.A. 1837) – associate justice
- Benjamin Cardozo (B.A. 1889, M.A. 1890) – associate justice
- William O. Douglas (LL.B. 1925) – associate justice
- Ruth Bader Ginsburg (LL.B. 1959) – associate justice
- Neil Gorsuch (B.A. 1988) – associate justice
- Charles Evans Hughes (LL.B. 1884) – associate and chief justice
- John Jay (B.A. 1764, M.A. 1767) – chief justice
- Joseph McKenna (attended law school) – associate justice
- Stanley Forman Reed (attended law school) – associate justice
- Harlan Fiske Stone (LL.B. 1898) – associate and chief justice

=== U.S. federal judges ===
- Nancy Abudu (B.A. 1996) – judge, U.S. Court of Appeals for the Eleventh Circuit
- Lynn Adelman (LL.B. 1965) – judge, U.S. District Court for the Eastern District of Wisconsin
- Ann Aldrich (B.A. 1948) – judge, U.S. District Court for the Northern District of Ohio
- Roy Altman (B.A. 2004) – judge, U.S. District Court for the Southern District of Florida
- Harry B. Anderson (LL.B. 1904) – judge, U.S. District Court for the Western District of Tennessee
- Harold Baker (attended college) – judge, U.S. District Court for the Eastern District of Illinois; chief judge, U.S. District Court for the Central District of Illinois; judge, Foreign Intelligence Surveillance Court; judge, Alien Terrorist Removal Court
- Maryanne Trump Barry (M.A. 1962) – judge, U.S. District Court for the District of New Jersey; judge, U.S. Court of Appeals for the Third Circuit
- Benjamin Beaton (J.D. 2009) – judge, U.S. District Court for the Western District of Kentucky
- Egbert Benson (B.A. 1765) – chief judge, U.S. Circuit Court for the Second Circuit
- Joseph F. Bianco (J.D. 1991) – judge, U.S. District Court for the Eastern District of New York
- Stephanos Bibas (B.A. 1989) – judge, U.S. Court of Appeals for the Third Circuit
- Samuel Blatchford (B.A. 1837) – judge, U.S. District Court for the Southern District of New York; judge, U.S. Court of Appeals for the Second Circuit; associate justice of the Supreme Court of the United States
- Victor Allen Bolden (B.A. 1986) – judge, U.S. District Court for the District of Connecticut
- William Bondy (B.A. 1890, M.A. 1891, Ph.D. 1892, LL.B. 1893) – chief judge, U.S. District Court for the Southern District of New York
- Richard F. Boulware (J.D. 2002) – judge, U.S. District Court for the District of Nevada
- Hugh H. Bownes (B.A. 1941, LL.B. 1948) – judge, U.S. District Court for the District of New Hampshire; judge, U.S. Court of Appeals for the First Circuit
- Vincent L. Briccetti (B.A. 1976) – judge, U.S. District Court for the Southern District of New York
- Charles L. Brieant (B.A. 1947, LL.B. 1949) – judge, U.S. District Court for the Southern District of New York
- Anita B. Brody (J.D. 1958) – judge, U.S. District Court for the Eastern District of Pennsylvania
- Gary R. Brown (B.A. 1985) – judge, U.S. District Court for the Eastern District of New York
- Frederick van Pelt Bryan (B.A. 1925, LL.B. 1928) – judge, U.S. District Court for the Southern District of New York
- Naomi Reice Buchwald (LL.B. 1968) – judge, U.S. District Court for the Southern District of New York
- Mortimer W. Byers (LL.B. 1898) – judge, U.S. District Court for the Eastern District of New York
- José A. Cabranes (B.A. 1961) – judge, U.S. District Court for the District of Connecticut; judge, U.S. Court of Appeals for the Second Circuit
- Robert L. Carter (LL.M. 1941) – judge, U.S. District Court for the Southern District of New York
- Claire C. Cecchi (B.A. 1986) – judge, U.S. District Court for the District of New Jersey
- Miriam Goldman Cedarbaum (B.A. 1950, LL.B. 1953) – judge, U.S. District Court for the Southern District of New York
- Thomas Chatfield (LL.B. 1896) – judge, U.S. District Court for the Eastern District of New York
- Jennifer Choe-Groves (LL.M. 1998) – judge, U.S. Court of International Trade
- John H. Chun (B.A. 1991) – judge, U.S. District Court for the Western District of Washington
- U. W. Clemon (J.D. 1968) – judge, U.S. District Court for the Northern District of Alabama
- LeBaron Bradford Colt (LL.B. 1870) – judge, U.S. District Court for the District of Rhode Island; judge, U.S. Circuit Courts for the First Circuit; judge, U.S. Court of Appeals for the First Circuit
- Kenneth Conboy (M.A. 1980) – judge, U.S. District Court for the Southern District of New York
- Denise Cote (M.A. 1969, J.D. 1975) – judge, U.S. District Court for the Southern District of New York
- Joseph Cross (attended law school) – judge, U.S. District Court for the District of New Jersey
- Oscar Hirsh Davis (LL.B. 1937) – judge, Court of Claims; judge, U.S. Court of Appeals for the Federal Circuit
- Archie Owen Dawson (B.A. 1921, LL.B. 1923) – judge, U.S. District Court for the Southern District of New York
- Dickinson R. Debevoise (LL.B. 1951) – judge, U.S. District Court for the District of New Jersey
- Paul S. Diamond (B.A. 1974) – judge, U.S. District Court for the Eastern District of Pennsylvania
- James Edward Doyle (LL.B. 1940) – judge, U.S. District Court for the Western District of Wisconsin
- Kyle Duncan (LL.M. 2004) – judge, U.S. Court of Appeals for the Fifth Circuit
- Samantha D. Elliott (J.D. 2006) – judge, U.S. District Court for the District of New Hampshire
- James Alger Fee (LL.B. 1914) – judge, U.S. District Court for the District of Oregon; judge, U.S. Court of Appeals for the Ninth Circuit
- Wilfred Feinberg (B.A. 1940, LL.B. 1946) – judge, U.S. District Court for the Southern District of New York; judge, U.S. Court of Appeals for the Second Circuit
- Marvin E. Frankel (LL.B. 1948) – judge, U.S. District Court for the Southern District of New York
- Daniel Mortimer Friedman (B.A. 1937, LL.B. 1940) – chief judge, Court of Claims; judge, U.S. Court of Appeals for the Federal Circuit
- Lee Parsons Gagliardi (LL.B. 1947) – judge, U.S. District Court for the Southern District of New York
- Nicholas Garaufis (B.A. 1969, J.D. 1974) – judge, U.S. District Court for the Eastern District of New York
- Paul G. Gardephe (J.D. 1982) – judge, U.S. District Court for the Southern District of New York
- Leonard I. Garth (B.A. 1942) – judge, U.S. District Court for the District of New Jersey; judge, U.S. Court of Appeals for the Third Circuit
- Nancy Gertner (B.A. 1967) – judge, U.S. District Court for the District of Massachusetts
- Ruth Bader Ginsburg (LL.B. 1959) – judge, U.S. Court of Appeals for the District of Columbia Circuit; associate justice of the Supreme Court of the United States
- Gerard Louis Goettel (J.D. 1955) – judge, U.S. District Court for the Southern District of New York
- Neil Gorsuch (B.A. 1988) – judge, U.S. Court of Appeals for the Tenth Circuit; associate justice of the Supreme Court of the United States
- Nathaniel M. Gorton (LL.B. 1966) – judge, U.S. District Court for the District of Massachusetts
- Joseph A. Greenaway Jr. (B.A. 1978) – judge, U.S. District Court for the District of New Jersey; judge, U.S. Court of Appeals for the Third Circuit
- Diane Gujarati (B.A. 1990) – judge, U.S. District Court for the Eastern District of New York
- Murray Gurfein (B.A. 1926) – judge, U.S. District Court for the Southern District of New York; judge, U.S. Court of Appeals for the Second Circuit
- John Patrick Hartigan (M.A. 1913, LL.B. 1913) – judge, U.S. District Court for the District of Rhode Island; judge, U.S. Court of Appeals for the First Circuit
- Richard Hartshorne (LL.B. 1912) – judge, U.S. District Court for the District of New Jersey
- Alexander Harvey II (LL.B. 1950) – judge, U.S. District Court for the District of Maryland
- Paul R. Hays (B.A. 1924, M.A. 1927, LL.B. 1933) – judge, U.S. Court of Appeals for the Second Circuit
- Alvin Hellerstein (B.A. 1954, J.D. 1956) – judge, U.S. District Court for the Southern District of New York
- William Bernard Herlands (LL.B. 1928) – judge, U.S. District Court for the Southern District of New York
- Ogden Hoffman Jr. (B.A. 1840) – judge, U.S. District Court for the Northern District of California; judge, U.S. District Court for the Southern District of California; judge, U.S. District Court for the District of California; judge, U.S. District Court for the Northern District of California
- George Chandler Holt (LL.B. 1869) – judge, U.S. District Court for the Southern District of New York
- Alexander Holtzoff (B.A. 1908, M.A. 1909, LL.B. 1911) – associate justice, District Court of the U.S. for the District of Columbia
- Richard J. Holwell (J.D. 1970) – judge, U.S. District Court for the Southern District of New York
- Denise Page Hood (J.D. 1977) – judge, U.S. District Court for the Eastern District of Michigan
- Beryl A. Howell (J.D. 1983) – judge, U.S. District Court for the District of Columbia
- Denis Reagan Hurley (M.B.A. 1962) – judge, U.S. District Court for the Eastern District of New York
- Sandra Segal Ikuta (M.S. 1978) – judge, U.S. Court of Appeals for the Ninth Circuit
- Dora Irizarry (J.D. 1979) – judge, U.S. District Court for the Eastern District of New York
- Kenneth M. Karas (J.D. 1991) – judge, U.S. District Court for the Southern District of New York
- Lawrence K. Karlton (J.D. 1958) – judge, U.S. District Court for the Eastern District of California
- Gary Stephen Katzmann (B.A. 1973) – judge, U.S. Court of International Trade
- Robert Katzmann (B.A. 1973) – judge, U.S. Court of Appeals for the Second Circuit
- Claire R. Kelly (B.A. 1987) – judge, U.S. Court of International Trade
- Emile Henry Lacombe (B.A. 1863, LL.B. 1865) – judge, U.S. Circuit Courts for the Second Circuit; judge, U.S. Court of Appeals for the Second Circuit
- Barbara Lagoa (J.D. 1992) – judge, U.S. Court of Appeals for the Eleventh Circuit
- Peter K. Leisure (attended law school) – judge, U.S. District Court for the Southern District of New York
- F. Dickinson Letts (attended) – associate justice, Supreme Court of the District of Columbia
- Ira Lloyd Letts (LL.B. 1917) – judge, U.S. District Court for the District of Rhode Island
- Harold Leventhal (B.A. 1934, LL.B. 1936) – judge, U.S. Court of Appeals for the District of Columbia Circuit
- Mary Johnson Lowe (LL.M. 1955) – judge, U.S. District Court for the Southern District of New York
- Gerard E. Lynch (B.A. 1972, J.D. 1975) – judge, U.S. District Court for the Southern District of New York; judge, U.S. Court of Appeals for the Second Circuit
- Frank J. Magill (M.A. 1953) – judge, U.S. Court of Appeals for the Eighth Circuit
- J. Daniel Mahoney (LL.B. 1955) – judge, U.S. Court of Appeals for the Second Circuit
- Nancy L. Maldonado (J.D. 2001) – judge, U.S. District Court for the Northern District of Illinois
- Martin Thomas Manton (LL.B. 1901) – judge, U.S. District Court for the Southern District of New York
- John S. Martin Jr. (LL.B. 1961) – judge, U.S. District Court for the Southern District of New York
- Howard Matz (B.A. 1965) – judge, U.S. District Court for the Central District of California
- Julius Marshuetz Mayer (LL.B. 1886) – judge, U.S. District Court for the Southern District of New York; judge, U.S. Court of Appeals for the Second Circuit
- Carl E. McGowan (LL.B. 1936) – judge, U.S. Court of Appeals for the District of Columbia Circuit
- Joseph McKenna (attended law school) – judge, U.S. Court of Appeals for the Ninth Circuit; associate justice of the Supreme Court of the United States
- Lawrence M. McKenna (LL.B. 1959) – judge, U.S. District Court for the Southern District of New York
- Charles F. McLaughlin (LL.B. 1910) – judge, U.S. District Court for the District of Columbia
- Hugh Dean McLellan (LL.B. 1901) – judge, U.S. District Court for the District of Massachusetts
- Harold Medina (LL.B. 1912) – judge, U.S. District Court for the Southern District of New York; judge, U.S. Court of Appeals for the Second Circuit
- Charles Miller Metzner (B.A. 1931, LL.B. 1933) – judge, U.S. District Court for the Southern District of New York; judge, Temporary Emergency Court of Appeals
- Jack Miller (J.D. 1946) – associate judge, U.S. Court of Customs and Patent Appeals; judge, U.S. Court of Appeals for the Federal Circuit
- Alfred Egidio Modarelli (B.A. 1920, M.A. 1922, LL.M. 1922) – judge, U.S. District Court for the District of New Jersey
- Leonard P. Moore (LL.B. 1922) – judge, U.S. Court of Appeals for the Second Circuit
- Constance Baker Motley (LL.B. 1946) – judge, U.S. District Court for the Southern District of New York
- Michael Mukasey (B.A. 1963) – judge, U.S. District Court for the Southern District of New York
- William Daniel Murray (attended) – judge, U.S. District Court for the District of Montana
- Pauline Newman (M.A. 1948) – judge, U.S. Court of Appeals for the Federal Circuit
- Eugene Nickerson (LL.B. 1943) – judge, U.S. District Court for the Eastern District of New York
- Maryellen Noreika (M.A. 1990) – judge, U.S. District Court for the District of Delaware
- Ambrose O'Connell (LL.B. 1910) – associate judge, U.S. Court of Customs and Patent Appeals
- James Carriger Paine (B.S. 1947) – judge, U.S. District Court for the Southern District of Florida
- Edmund Louis Palmieri (B.A. 1926, LL.B. 1929) – judge, U.S. District Court for the Southern District of New York
- Robert P. Patterson Jr. (LL.B. 1950) – judge, U.S. District Court for the Southern District of New York
- Myrna Pérez (J.D. 2003) – judge, U.S. Court of Appeals for the Second Circuit
- S. Jay Plager (LL.M. 1961) – judge, U.S. Court of Appeals for the Federal Circuit
- Milton Pollack (B.A. 1927, J.D. 1929) – judge, U.S. District Court for the Southern District of New York
- Timothy M. Reif (J.D. 1985) – judge, U.S. Court of International Trade
- Walter Herbert Rice (J.D. 1962, M.B.A. 1962) – judge, U.S. District Court for the Southern District of Ohio
- Giles Rich (LL.B. 1929) – associate judge, U.S. Court of Customs and Patent Appeals; judge, U.S. Court of Appeals for the Federal Circuit
- Simon H. Rifkind (LL.B. 1925) – judge, U.S. District Court for the Southern District of New York
- Richard W. Roberts (J.D. 1978) – judge, U.S. District Court for the District of Columbia
- George Rosling (B.A. 1920) – judge, U.S. District Court for the Eastern District of New York
- Veronica S. Rossman (B.A. 1993) – judge, U.S. Court of Appeals for the Tenth Circuit
- Robert D. Sack (LL.B. 1963) – judge, U.S. Court of Appeals for the Second Circuit
- Shira Scheindlin (M.A. 1969) – judge, U.S. District Court for the Southern District of New York; magistrate, U.S. District Court for the Eastern District of New York
- Richard Seeborg (J.D. 1981) – judge, U.S. District Court for the Northern District of California
- Charles Proctor Sifton (LL.B. 1961) – judge, U.S. District Court for the Eastern District of New York
- William Francis Smith (Ph.G. 1922) – judge, U.S. District Court for the District of New Jersey; judge, U.S. Court of Appeals for the Third Circuit
- Leo T. Sorokin (J.D. 1991) – judge, U.S. District Court for the District of Massachusetts
- James Marshall Sprouse (LL.B. 1949) – judge, U.S. Court of Appeals for the Fourth Circuit
- John Foster Symes (LL.B. 1903) – judge, U.S. District Court for the District of Colorado
- Anna Diggs Taylor (B.A. 1954) – judge, U.S. District Court for the Eastern District of Michigan
- Analisa Torres (J.D. 1984) – judge, U.S. District Court for the Southern District of New York
- David G. Trager (B.A. 1959) – judge, U.S. District Court for the Eastern District of New York
- Robert Troup (B.A. 1774) – judge, U.S. District Court for the District of New York
- Harold R. Tyler Jr. (LL.B. 1949) – judge, U.S. District Court for the Southern District of New York
- William P. Van Ness (B.A. 1797) – judge, U.S. District Court for the District of New York; judge, U.S. District Court for the Southern District of New York
- Van Vechten Veeder – judge, U.S. District Court for the Eastern District of New York
- Richard Wilde Walker (attended law school) – judge, U.S. Court of Appeals for the Fifth Circuit
- Lawrence Walsh (B.A. 1932, LL.B. 1935) – judge, U.S. District Court for the Southern District of New York
- Jack B. Weinstein (LL.B. 1948) – chief judge, U.S. District Court for the Eastern District of New York
- George Emery Weller (LL.B. 1889) – associate justice, U.S. Customs Court; member, Board of General Appraisers
- Lawrence Aloysius Whipple (B.S. 1933) – judge, U.S. District Court for the District of New Jersey
- Helene White (B.A. 1975) – judge, U.S. Court of Appeals for the Sixth Circuit
- Jerre Stockton Williams (J.D. 1941) – judge, U.S. Court of Appeals for the Fifth Circuit
- Karen J. Williams (B.A. 1972) – judge, U.S. Court of Appeals for the Fourth Circuit
- Francis A. Winslow (LL.B. 1889) – judge, U.S. District Court for the Southern District of New York
- Peter Woodbury (attended law school) – judge, U.S. Court of Appeals for the First Circuit
- John M. Woolsey (LL.B. 1901) – judge, U.S. District Court for the Southern District of New York
- Reynier Jacob Wortendyke Jr. (LL.B. 1922) – judge, U.S. District Court for the District of New Jersey
- Joseph Carmine Zavatt (B.A. 1922, LL.B. 1924) – judge, U.S. District Court for the Eastern District of New York

=== U.S. non-federal judges ===
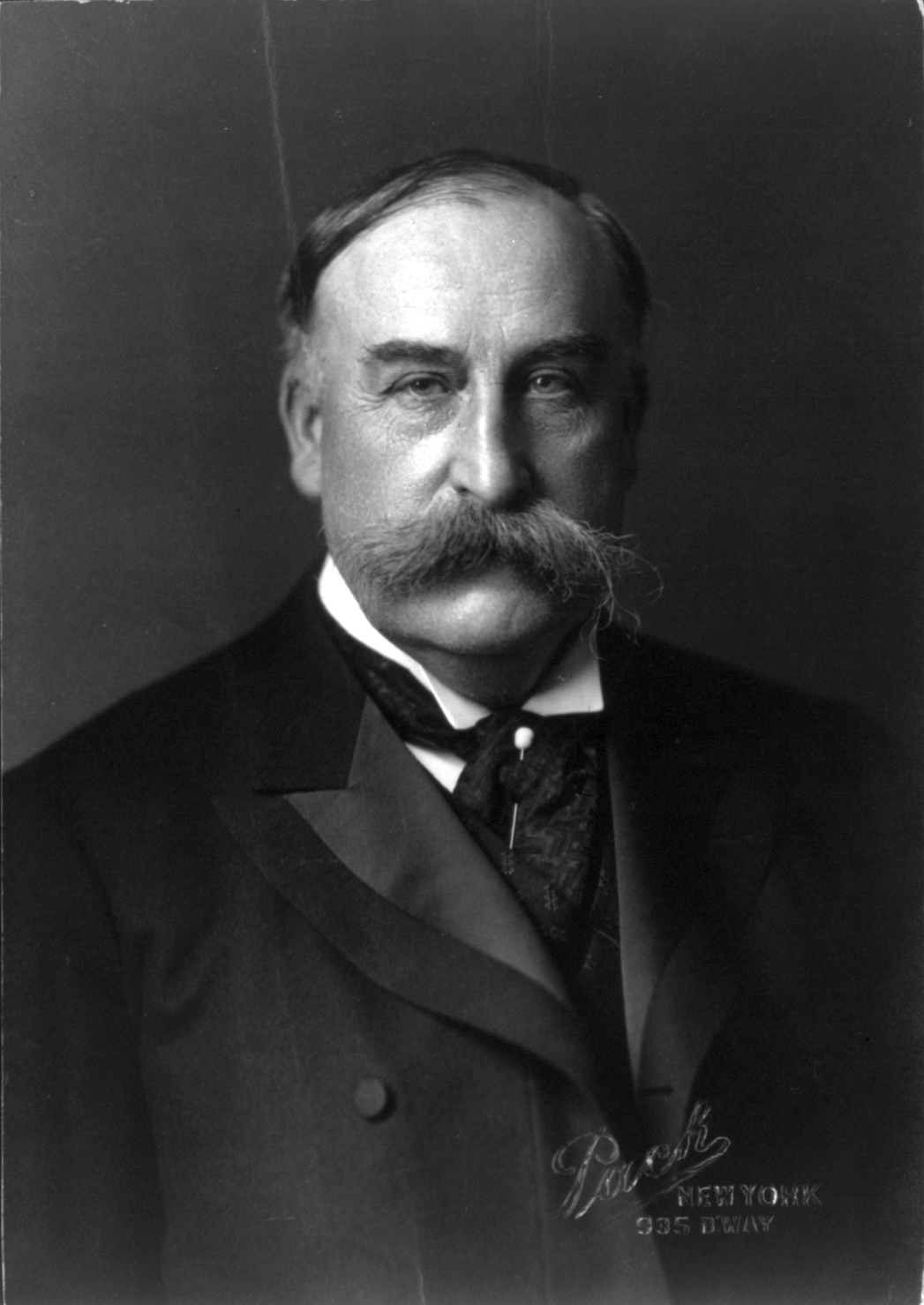
Edgar M. Cullen

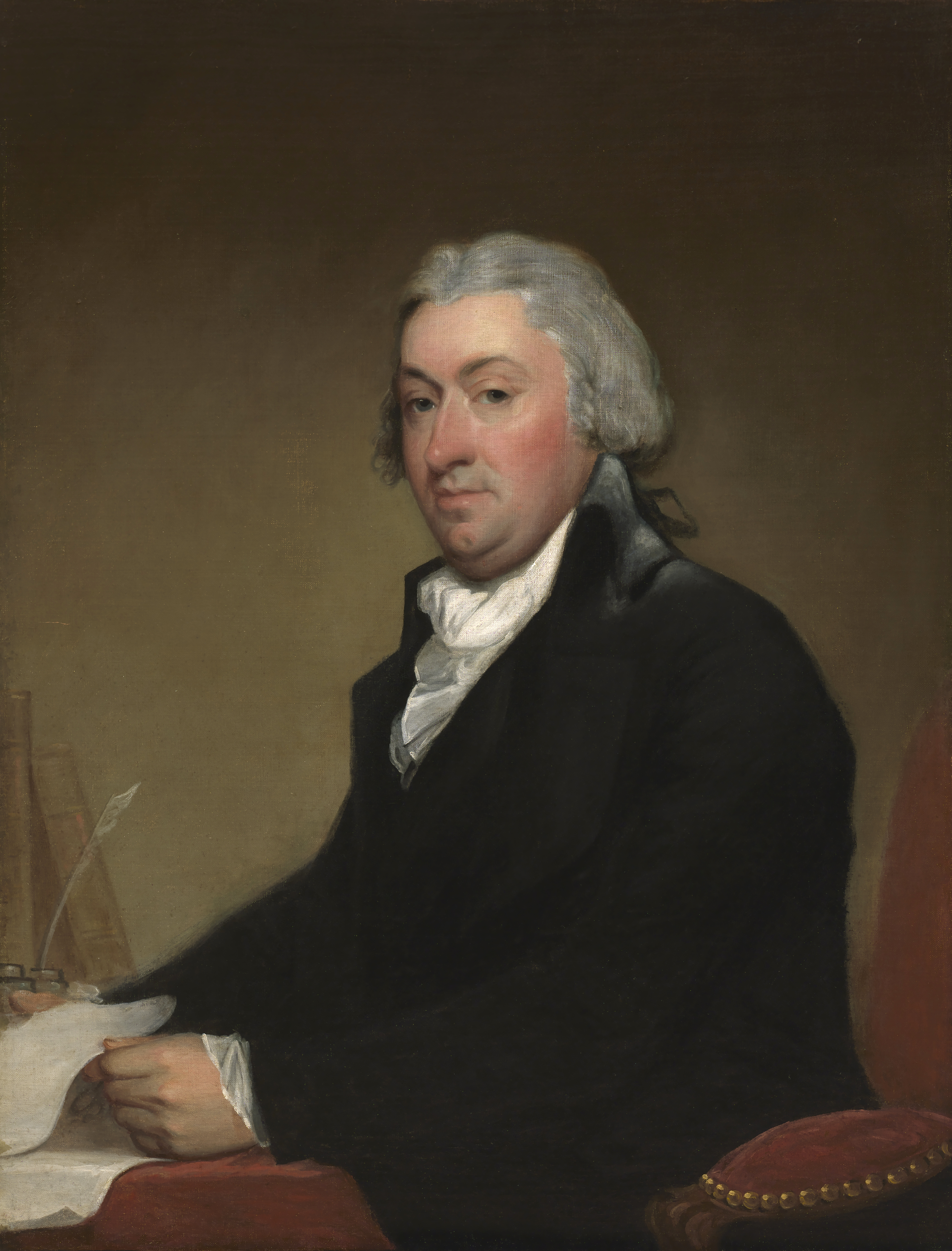
Robert R. Livingston

- Sheila Abdus-Salaam (J.D. 1977) – associate judge, New York Court of Appeals
- Rolando Acosta (B.A., J.D.) – presiding justice of the First Judicial Department
- Willard Bartlett (B.A.) – chief judge, New York Court of Appeals (1914–1916)
- Edgar M. Cullen (B.A. 1860) – chief judge, New York Court of Appeals (1904–1913)
- John J. "Jack" Farley, III (M.B.A. 1966) – former judge, United States Court of Appeals for Veterans Claims
- Jaime Fuster (LL.M. 1966) – associate justice, Supreme Court of Puerto Rico
- Eric Holder (B.A. 1973, J.D. 1976) – judge, Superior Court of the District of Columbia, U.S. attorney for the District of Columbia, deputy U.S. attorney general
- Samuel Jones (1790) – fifth chancellor of New York; ex officio member, New York Court of Appeals
- Robert R. Livingston – first chancellor of New York, administered oath of office to President George Washington, negotiated the Louisiana Purchase
- Deborah Poritz (graduate study) – chief justice, New Jersey Supreme Court (1996–06); Attorney General of New Jersey (1994–96); first woman to serve in each position
- Eric T. Washington (J.D. 1979) – chief judge, District of Columbia Court of Appeals, the highest appellate court for the District of Columbia
- Augustus B. Woodward (B.A. 1793) – first chief justice, Michigan Territory; appointed by President Thomas Jefferson; with the governor and two associate justices possessed all the legislative power in the Territory 1805–1824; co-founded the University of Michigan

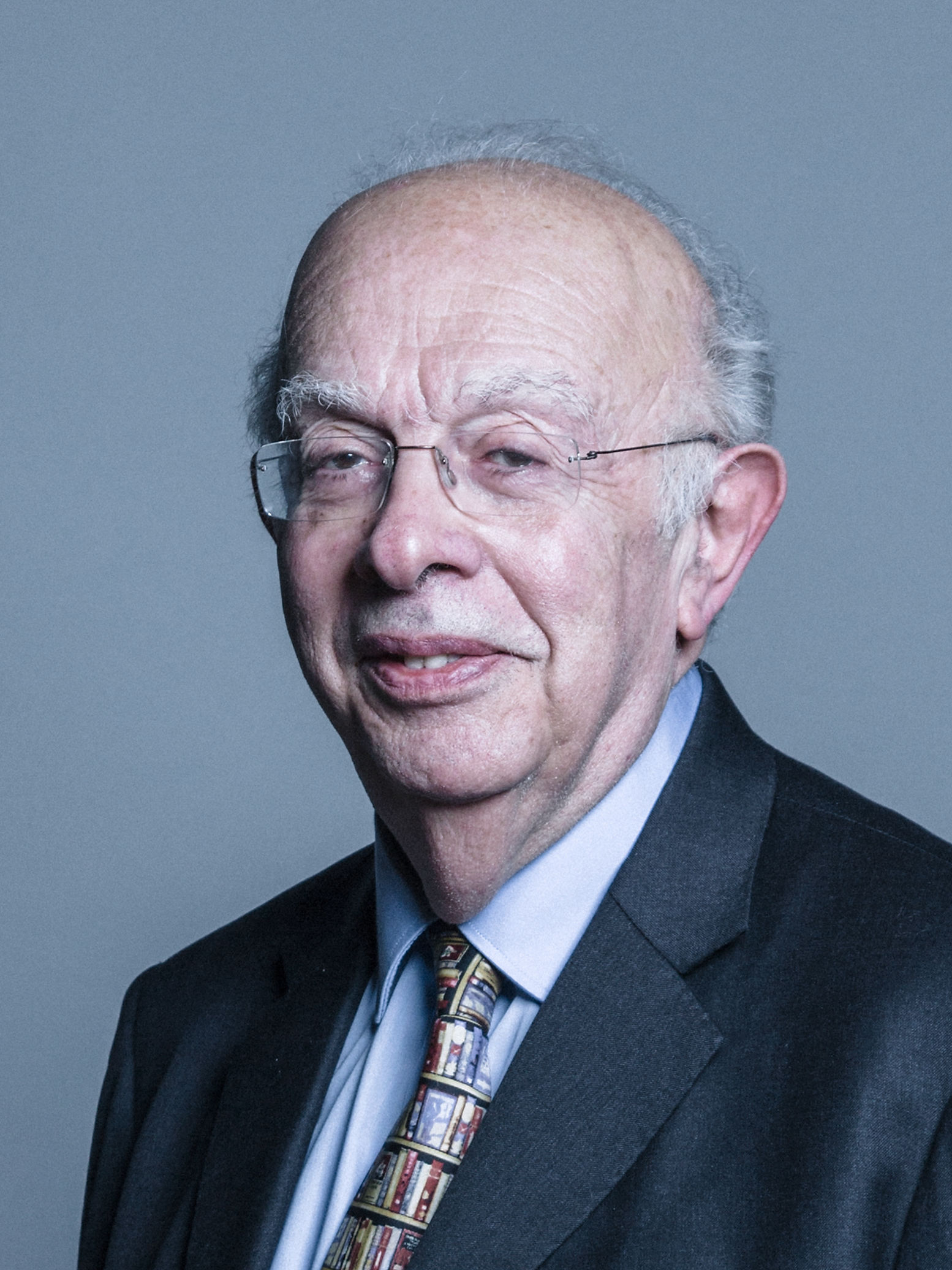
Lawrence Collins, Baron Collins of Mapesbury

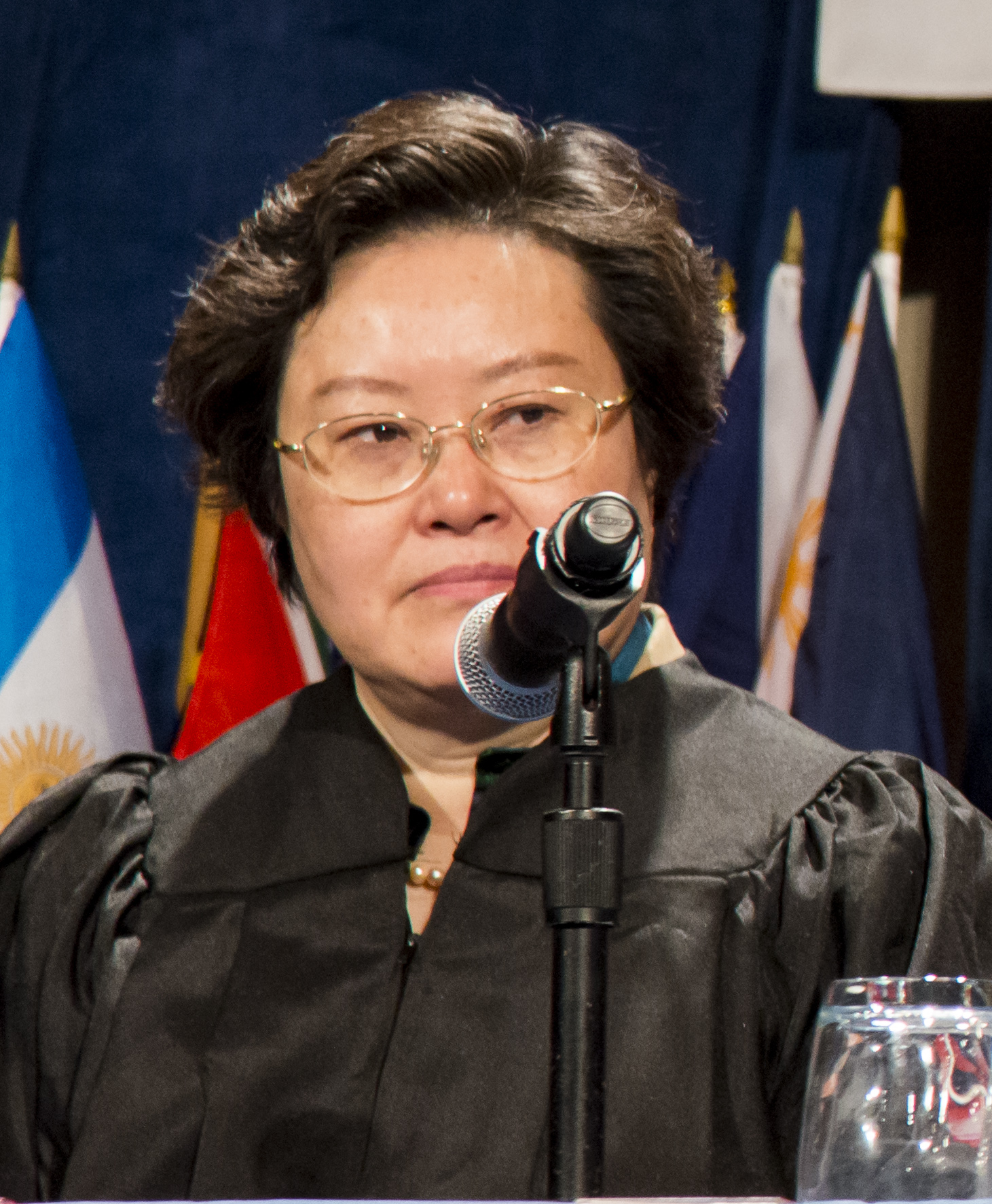
Xue Hanqin

=== Foreign judges ===
- Joaquim Barbosa (visiting scholar, CLS, 1999, 2000) – chief justice of Brazil (2012–); only black Supreme Federal Court justice minister in Brazil
- Karin Maria Bruzelius (LL.M. 1969) – justice of the Supreme Court of Norway (1997–2011)
- Lawrence Collins, Baron Collins of Mapesbury (LL.M.) – former justice of the Supreme Court of the United Kingdom (2009–2011); Lord of Appeal in Ordinary (2009); lord justice of appeal (2007–09); Judicial Committee of the Privy Council (see the Privy Council) (2007–); judge, High Court of England and Wales (2000)
- Susan Denham (LL.M.) – 11th chief justice (2011–), associate justice (1992–2011), Supreme Court of Ireland, first female chief justice
- Philip Jessup (Ph.D.) – judge, International Court of Justice (1961–1970)
- V.K. Wellington Koo (B.A., Ph.D.) – judge, International Court of Justice (1957–1967), former president of the Republic of China, premier of the Republic of China and Chinese ambassador to the United States
- Marvic Mario Victor F. Leonen (LL.M.) – associate justice, Supreme Court of the Philippines (2012–)
- Liana Fiol Matta (LL.M., S.J.D.) – second woman in Puerto Rican history to serve as associate justice, Supreme Court of Puerto Rico (as of 2011)
- John T. McDonough (LL.B. 1861) – appointed by President Theodore Roosevelt as associate justice, Supreme Court of the Philippines
- George Moe (LL.M.) – chief justice, Supreme Court of Belize (1982–85); justice, Eastern Caribbean Supreme Court (1985–1991)
- Sean Murphy (J.D. 1985) – member, U.N. International Law Commission (2011–)
- Shi Jiuyong (LL.M. 1951) – former president, U.N. International Court of Justice (2003–2010); former chairman, International Law Commission
- Francis M. Ssekandi (LL.M.) – former justice, Supreme Court of Uganda (the highest court in the country of Uganda); judge, World Bank Administrative Tribunal (2007–)
- Hironobu Takesaki (LL.M. 1971) – 17th chief justice of the Supreme Court of Japan (the highest court in the country of Japan) (2008–)
- Umu Hawa Tejan-Jalloh (LL.M.) – chief justice (2008–), associate justice (2002–2008), Supreme Court of Sierra Leone
- Smokin Wanjala (LL.M.) – associate justice of the Supreme Court of Kenya (2012–)
- Xue Hanqin (LL.M. 1983, J.S.D. 1995) – judge, U.N. International Court of Justice (2010–); Chinese diplomat and international law expert
- Richard W. Young (LL.B. 1884) – appointed by President William McKinley as associate justice, Supreme Court of the Philippines; also a U.S. Army brigadier general

== U.S. senators ==
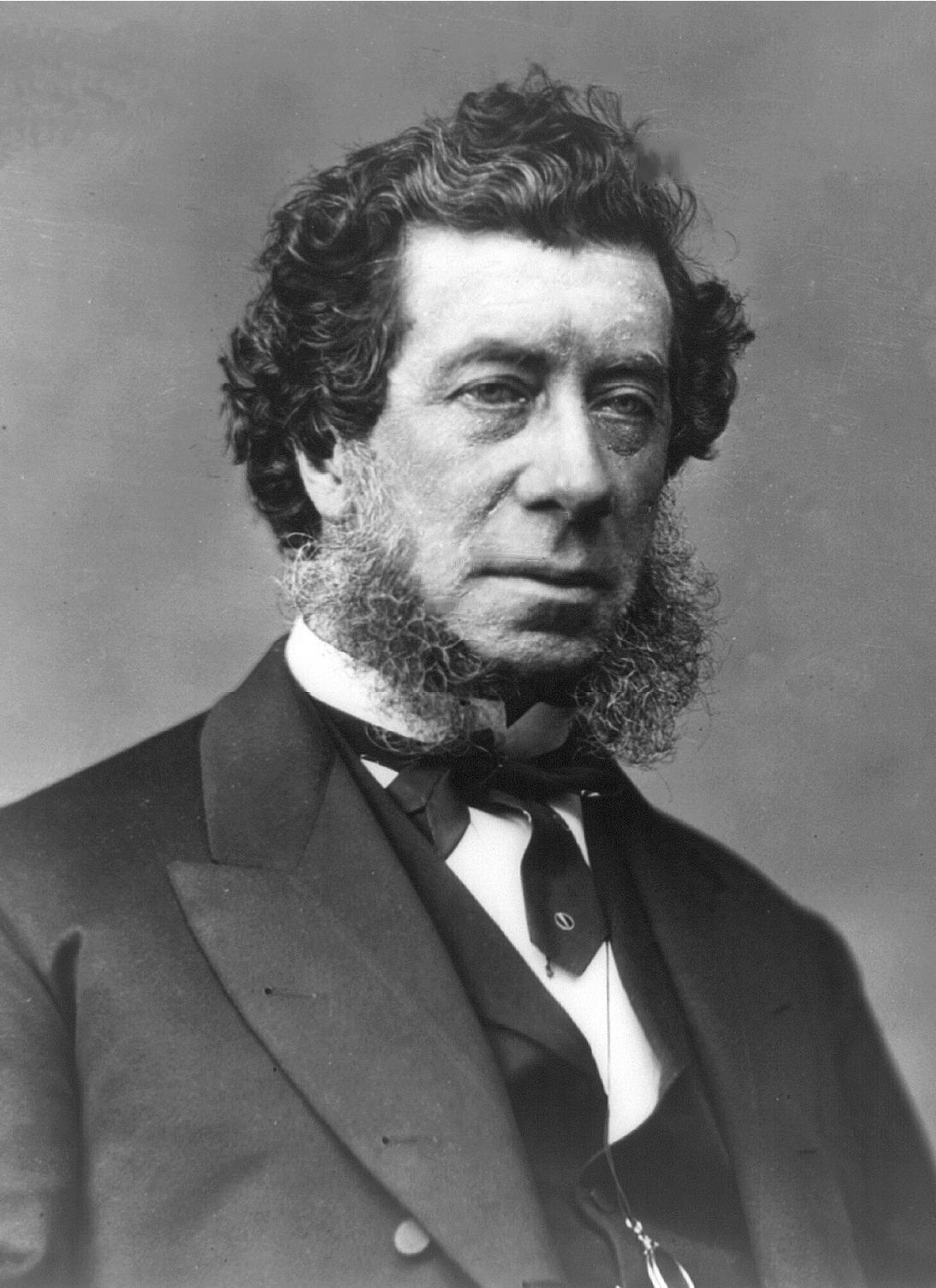
Hamilton Fish

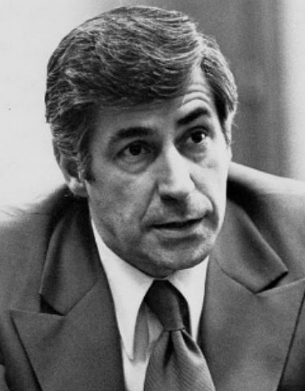
Mike Gravel

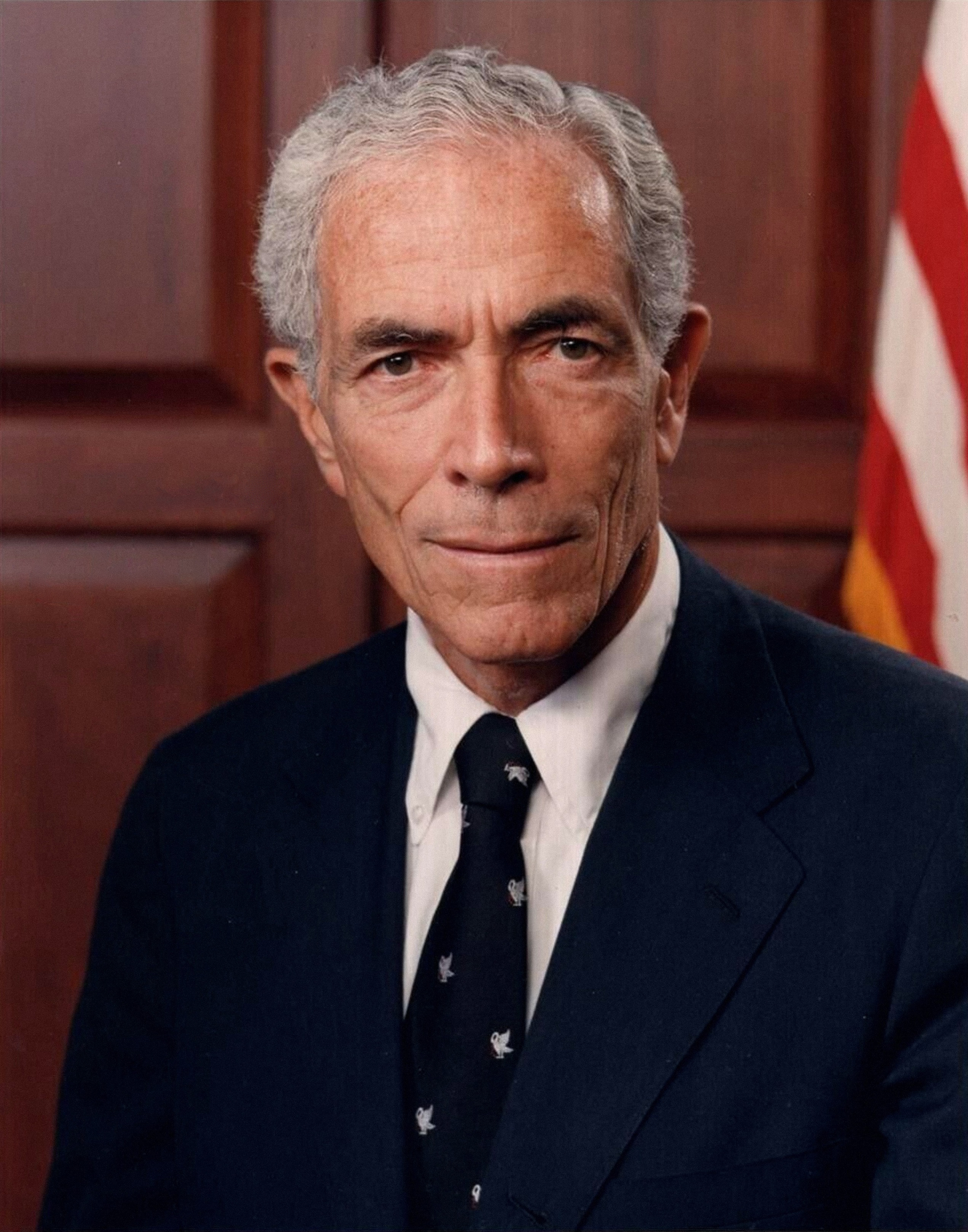
Claiborne Pell

- Alva B. Adams (1899) – senator from Colorado (1923–24, 1933–41)
- Johnson N. Camden Jr. – senator from Kentucky (1914–15)
- Clifford P. Case (LL.B. 1928) – congressman (1945–53) and senator (1955–79) from New Jersey
- DeWitt Clinton – senator from New York
- LeBaron B. Colt (1870) – senator from Rhode Island (1913–1924)
- Paul Douglas (M.A. 1915, Ph.D. 1921) – senator from Illinois (1949–1967)
- Hamilton Fish (B.A. 1827) – congressman (1843–45) and senator (1851–57) from New York
- Slade Gorton (J.D. 1953) – senator from Washington (1981–1987, 1989–2001)
- Frank Porter Graham (1916) – senator from North Carolina (1949–51)
- Mike Gravel (B.S. 1956) – senator from Alaska (1969–1981), candidate for the 2008 and 2020 U.S. presidential elections
- Judd Gregg (B.A. 1969) – congressman (1981–89) and senator (1993–2011) from New Hampshire
- Frederick Hale (1896–97) – senator from Maine (1917–1941)
- Lister Hill (left 1915) – congressman (1923–38) and senator (1938–69) from Alabama
- Richard C. Hunter (1911) – senator from Nebraska (1934–35)
- Jacob Javits – congressman (1947–54) and senator (1957–1981) from New York
- Daniel T. Jewett (B.A. 1830) – senator from Missouri (1870–71)
- Bob Kasten (M.B.A. 1966) – congressman (1975–79) and senator (1981–93) from Wisconsin
- John Kean (1875) – congressman (1883–85, 1887–89) and senator (1899–1911) from New Jersey
- William Langer – senator from North Dakota (1941–59)
- Frank Lautenberg (B.S. 1949) – senator from New Jersey (1982–2001, 2003–2013)
- Luke Lea (1903) – senator from Tennessee (1911–17)
- Joshua B. Lee (1924) – congressman (1935–37) and senator (1937–43) from Oklahoma
- Oren E. Long (1922) – senator from Hawaii (1959–63)
- Thomas E. Martin (LL.M. 1928) – congressman (1939–55) and senator (1955–61) from Iowa
- Jack Miller (1946) – senator from Iowa (1961–1973)
- Gouverneur Morris (B.A. 1768, M.A. 1771) – senator from New York (1800–03)
- Dwight Morrow – senator from New Jersey (1930–31)
- Wayne Morse (S.J.D. 1932) – senator from Oregon (1945–69)
- Karl Earl Mundt (M.A. 1927) – congressman (1939–1948) and senator (1948–1973) from South Dakota
- Barack Obama (B.A. 1983) – senator from Illinois (2005–2008)
- Joseph C. O'Mahoney (B.A.) – senator from Wyoming (1934–53, 1954–61)
- Frank C. Partridge (1864) – senator from Vermont (1930–31)
- John Patton Jr. (1877) – senator from Michigan (1894–95)
- Claiborne Pell (M.A. 1946) – senator from Rhode Island (1961–1997)
- John Randolph of Roanoke (attended) – congressman (1799–1813, 1815–17, 1819–25, 1827–29, 1833) and senator (1825–27) from Virginia
- John Slidell (B.A. 1810) – congressman (1843–45) and senator (1853–61) from Louisiana
- Howard Alexander Smith (1908) – senator from New Jersey (1944–59)
- Richard Stone (1954) – senator from Florida (1975–80)
- Arthur Vivian Watkins (1912) – senator from Utah (1947–59)
- George P. Wetmore (1869) – senator from Rhode Island (1895–1907, 1908–13)
- Harrison A. Williams (1948) – congressman (1953–57) and senator (1959–82) from New Jersey

== U.S. representatives ==
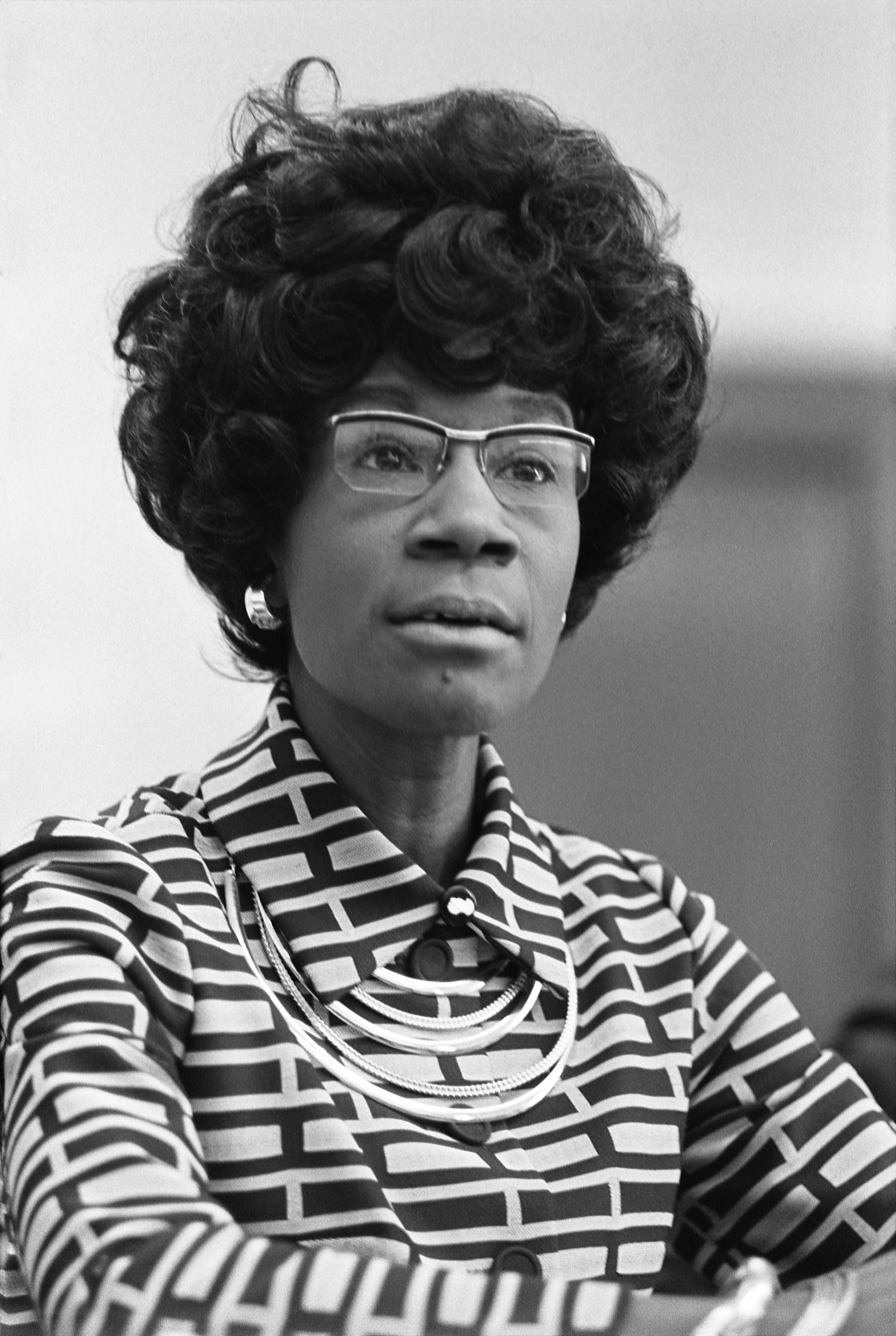
Shirley Chisholm

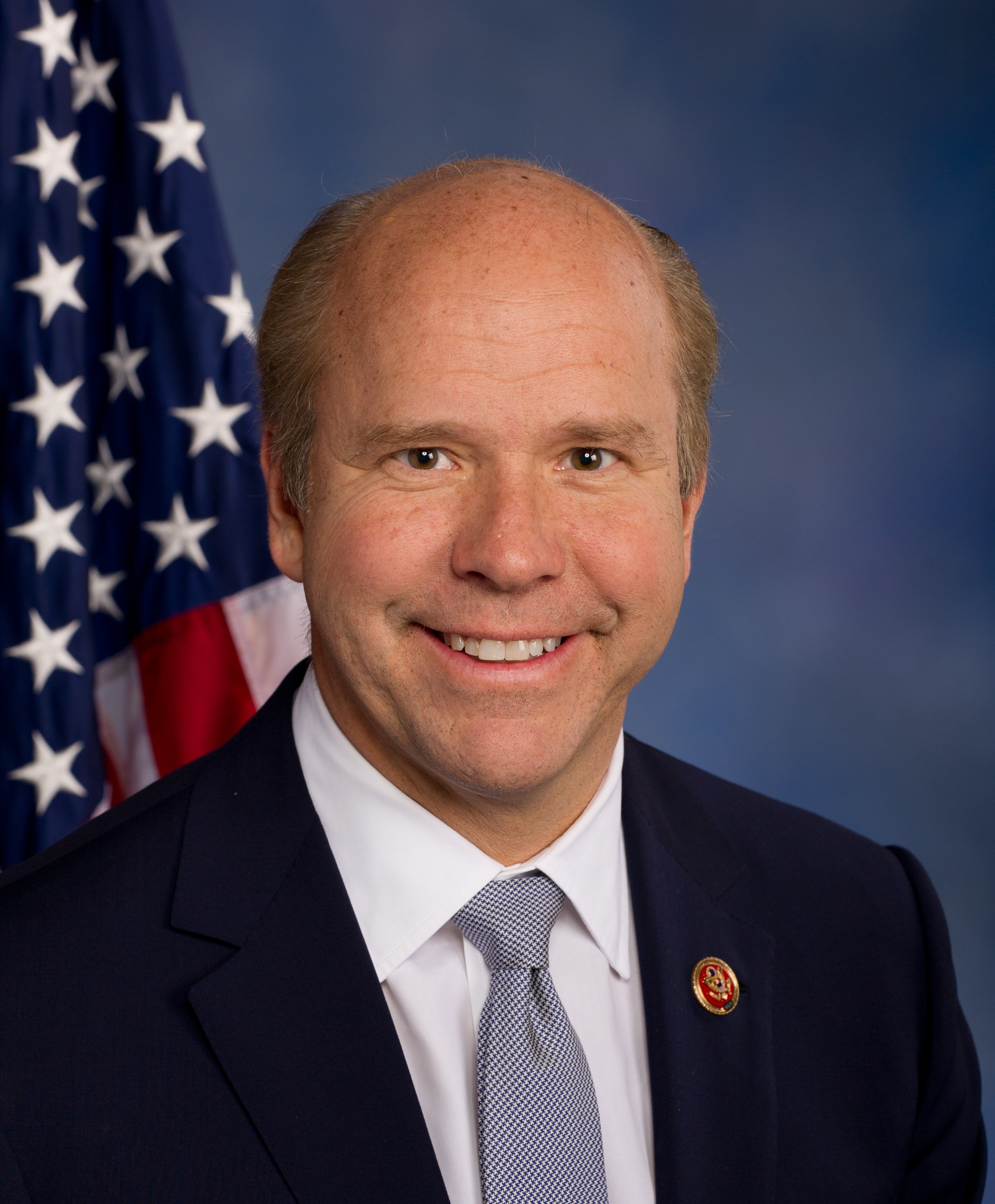
John Delaney

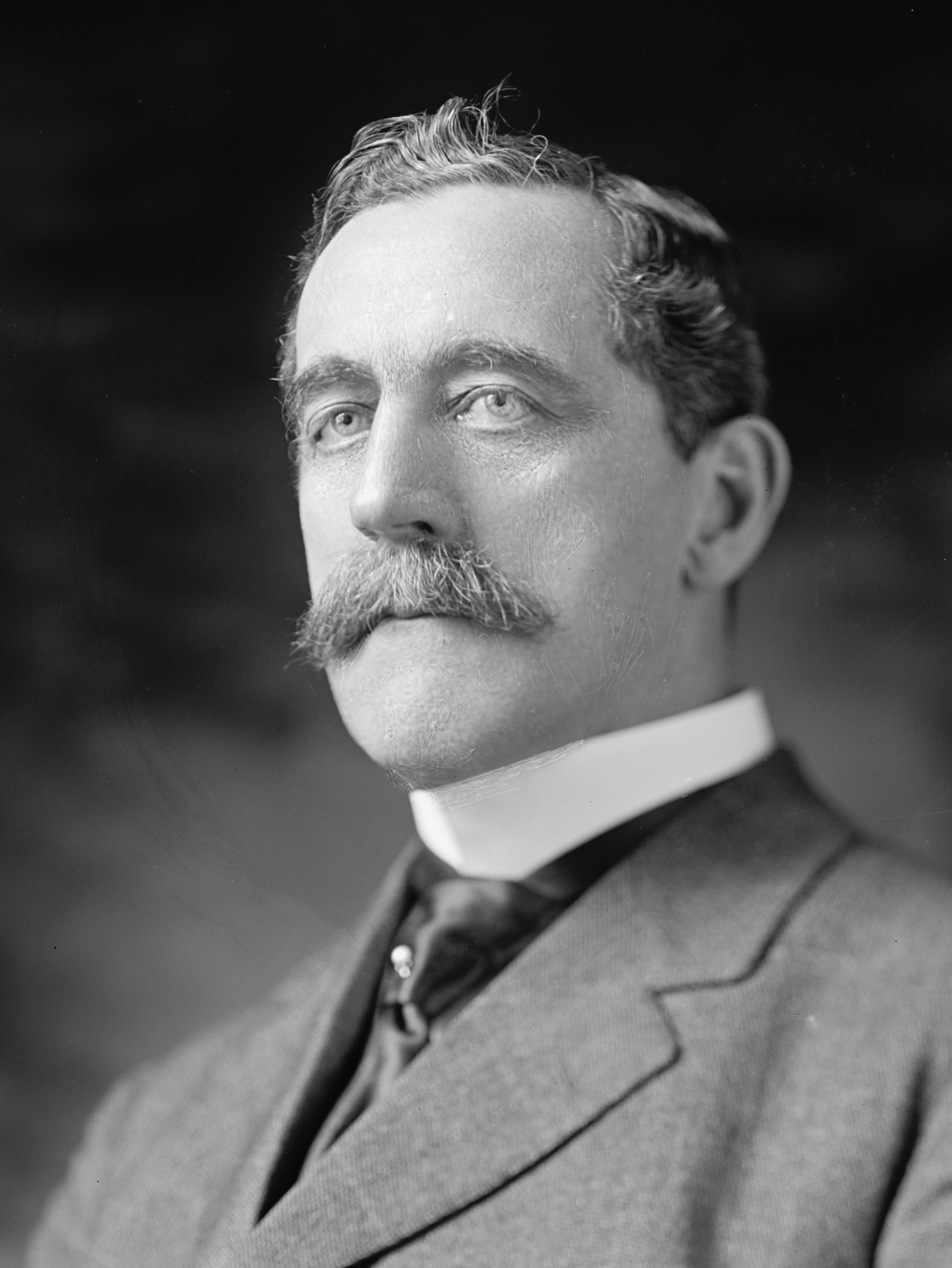
Hamilton Fish II

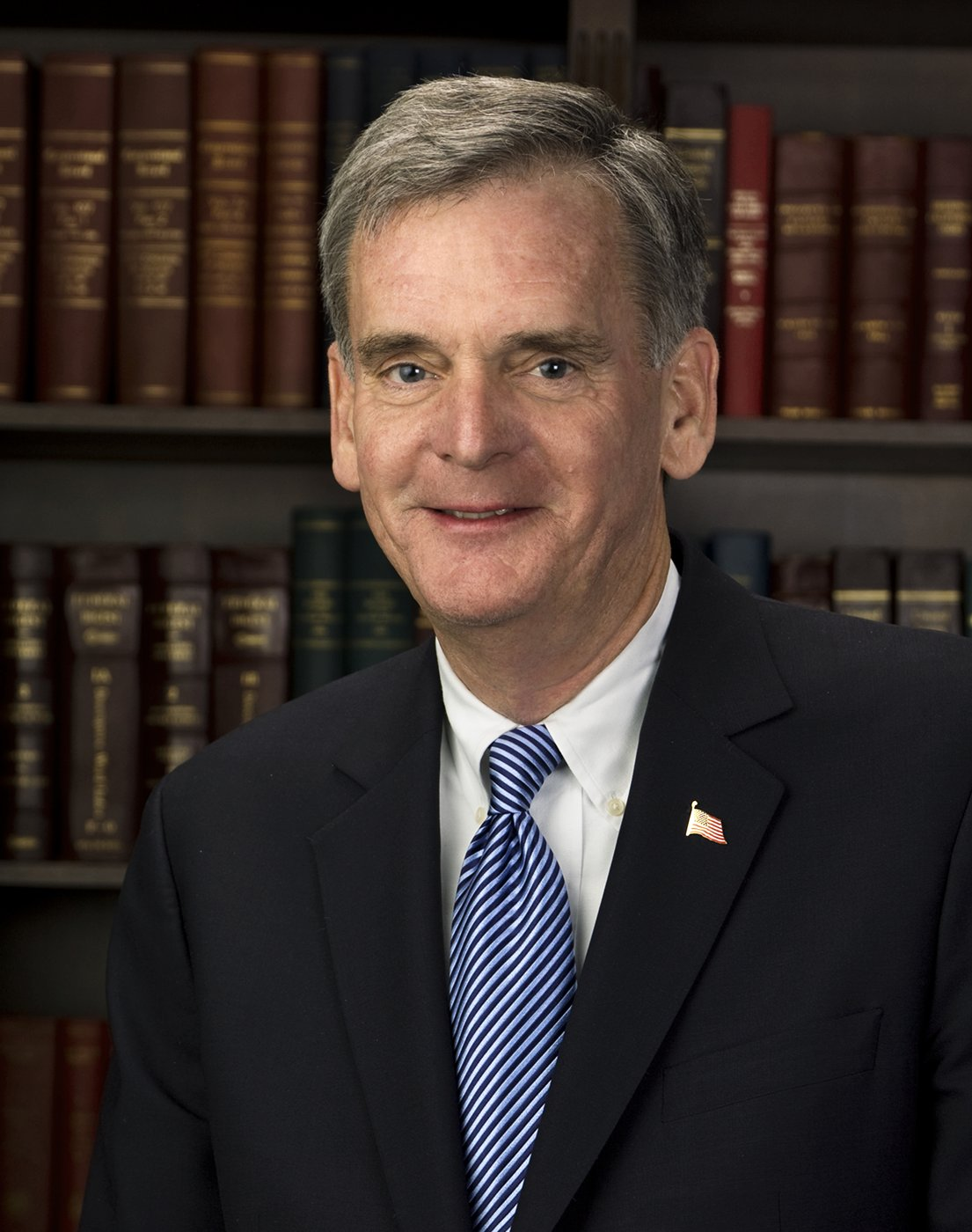
Judd Gregg

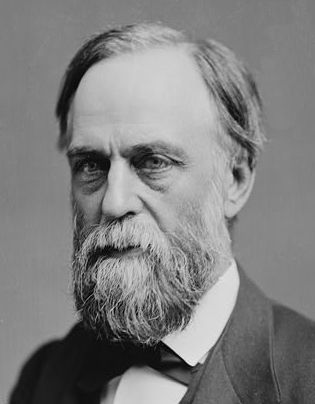
Abram Hewitt

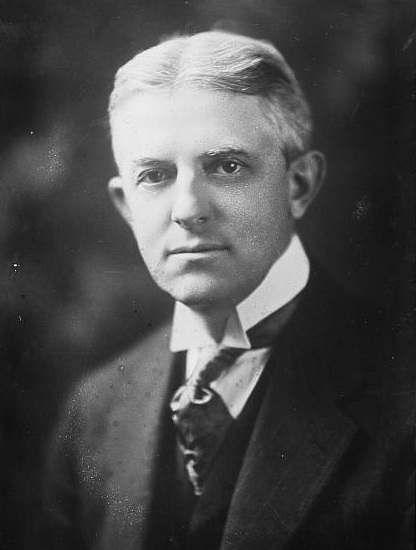
George R. Lunn

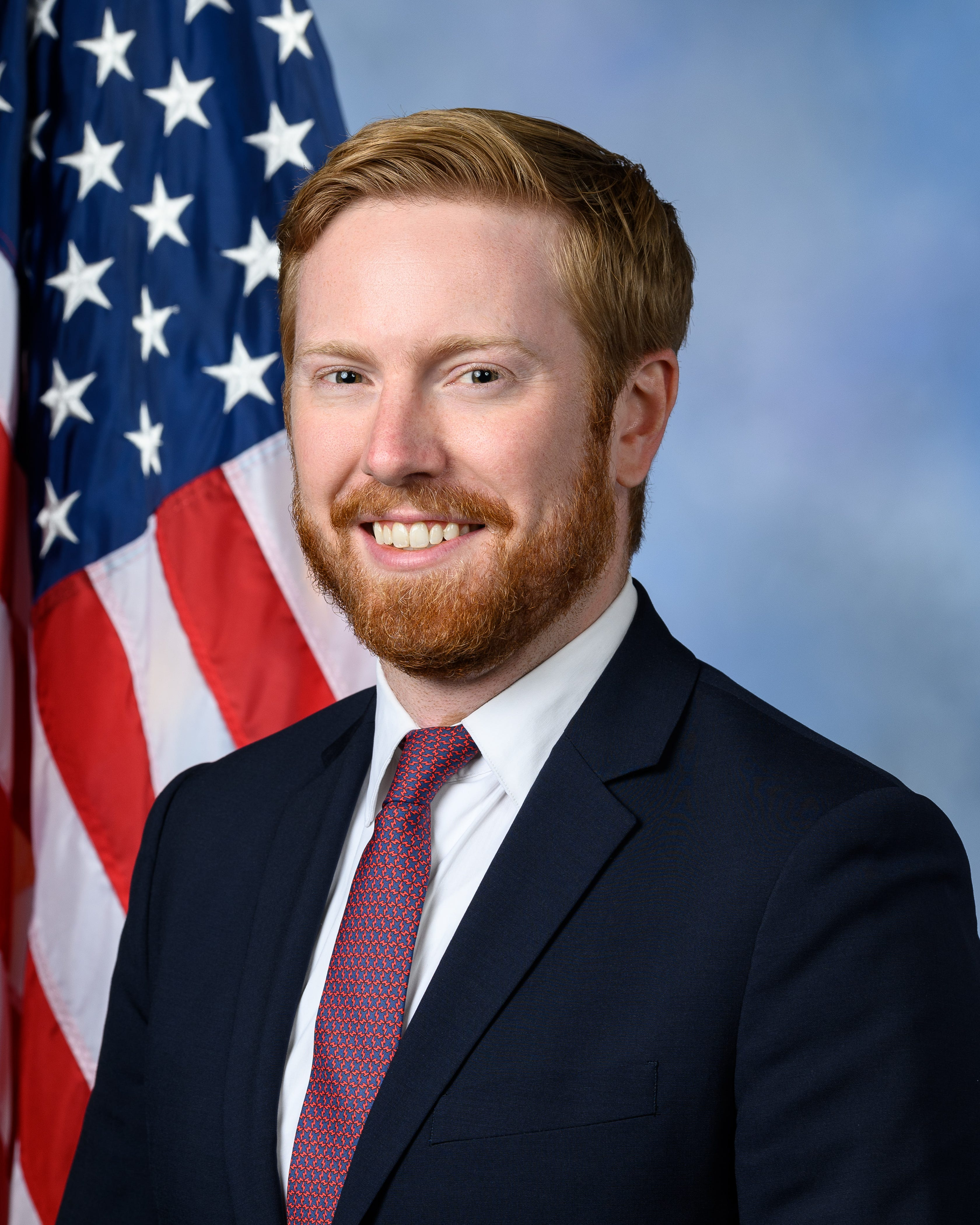
Peter Meijer

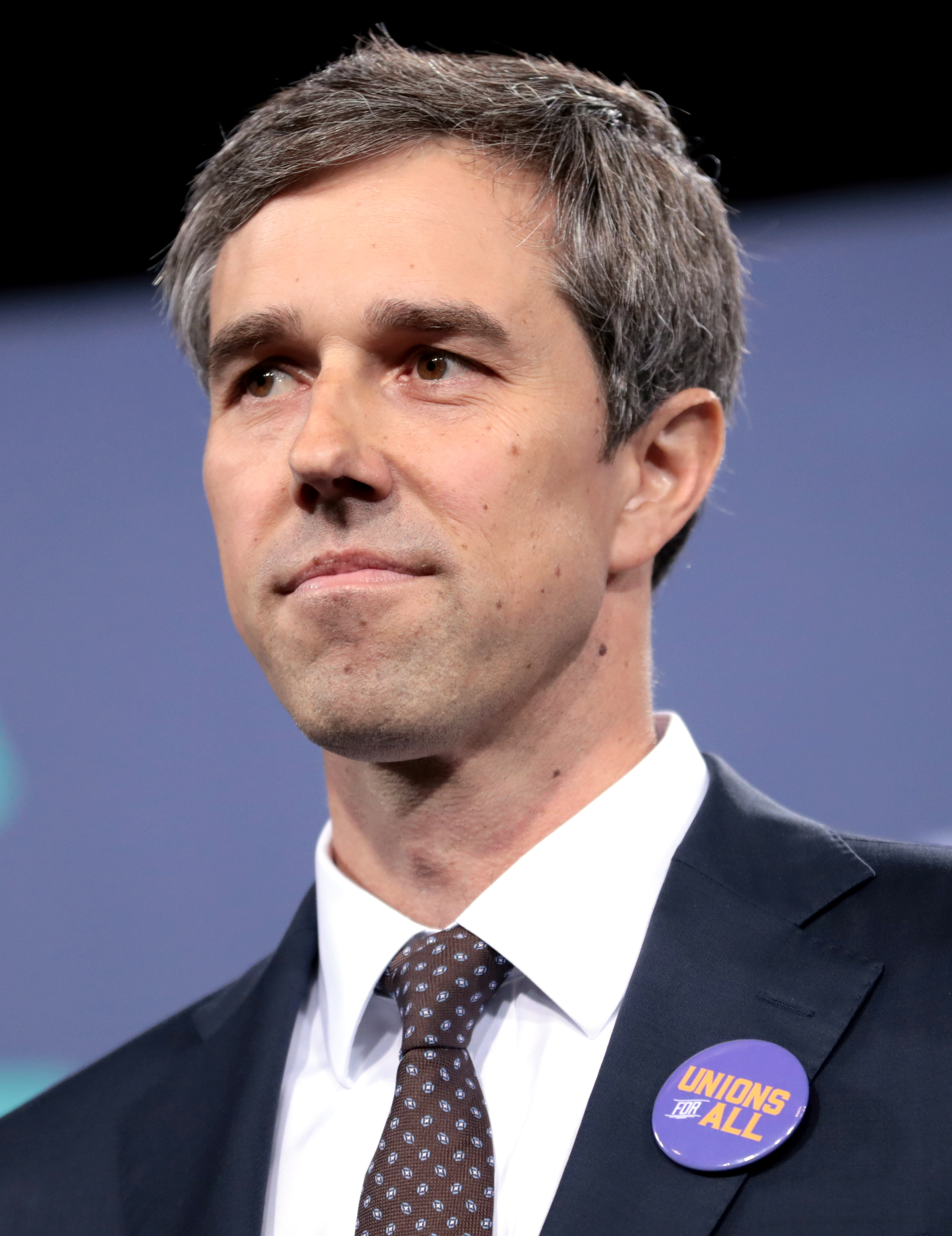
Beto O'Rourke

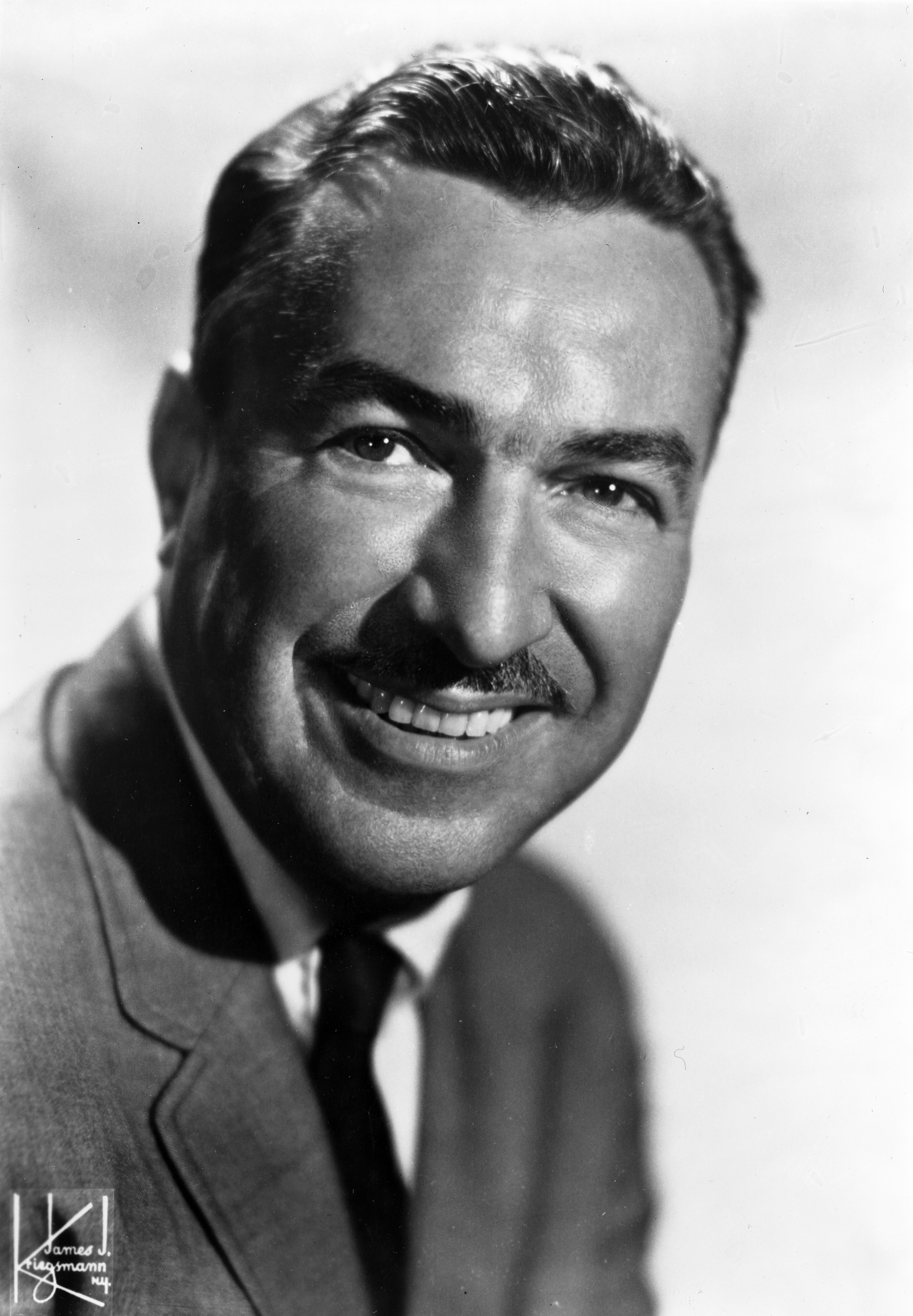
Adam Clayton Powell Jr.

John Randolph of Roanoke

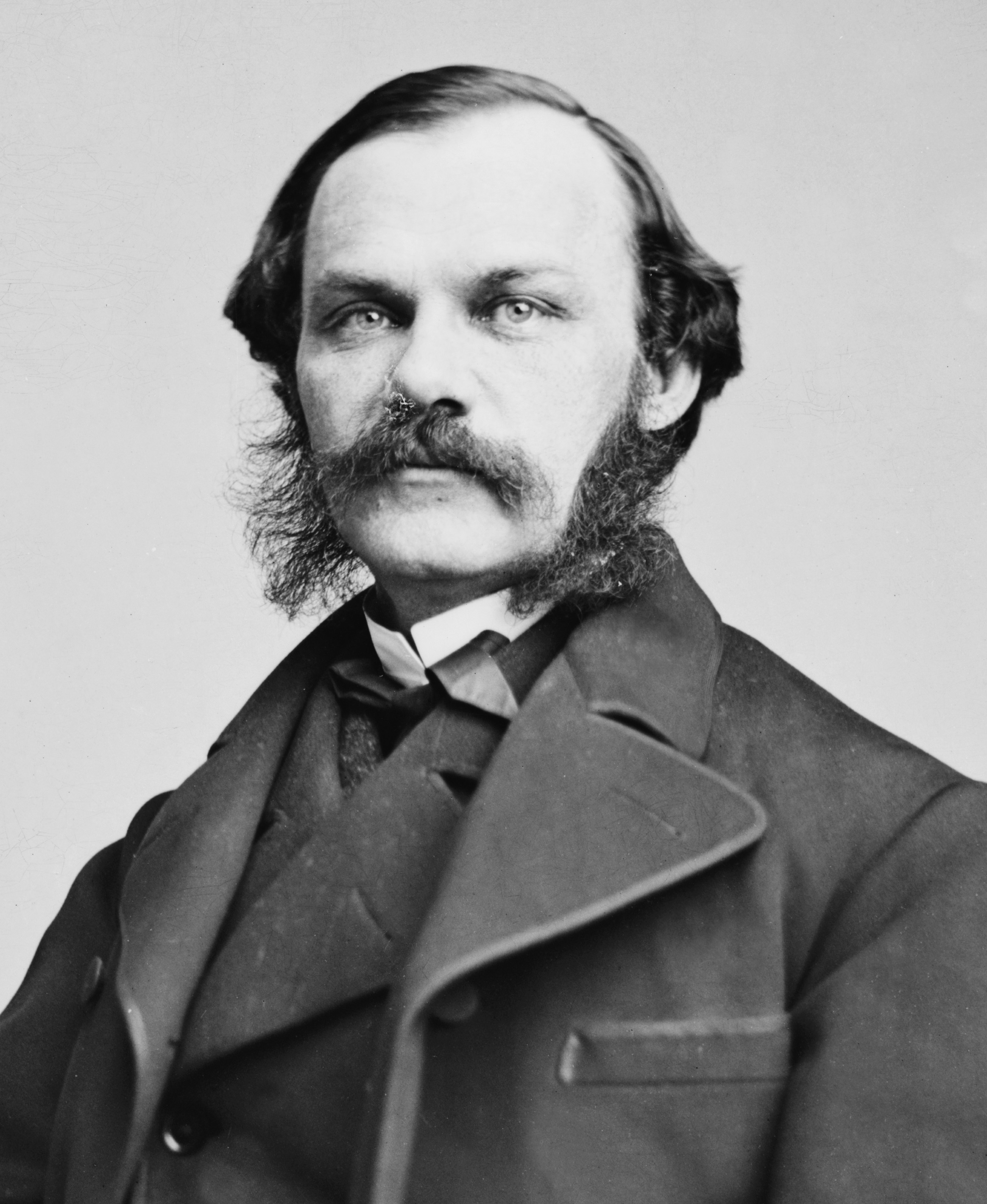
Henry Jarvis Raymond

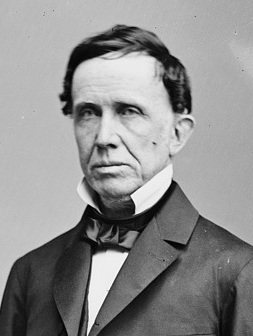
James I. Roosevelt

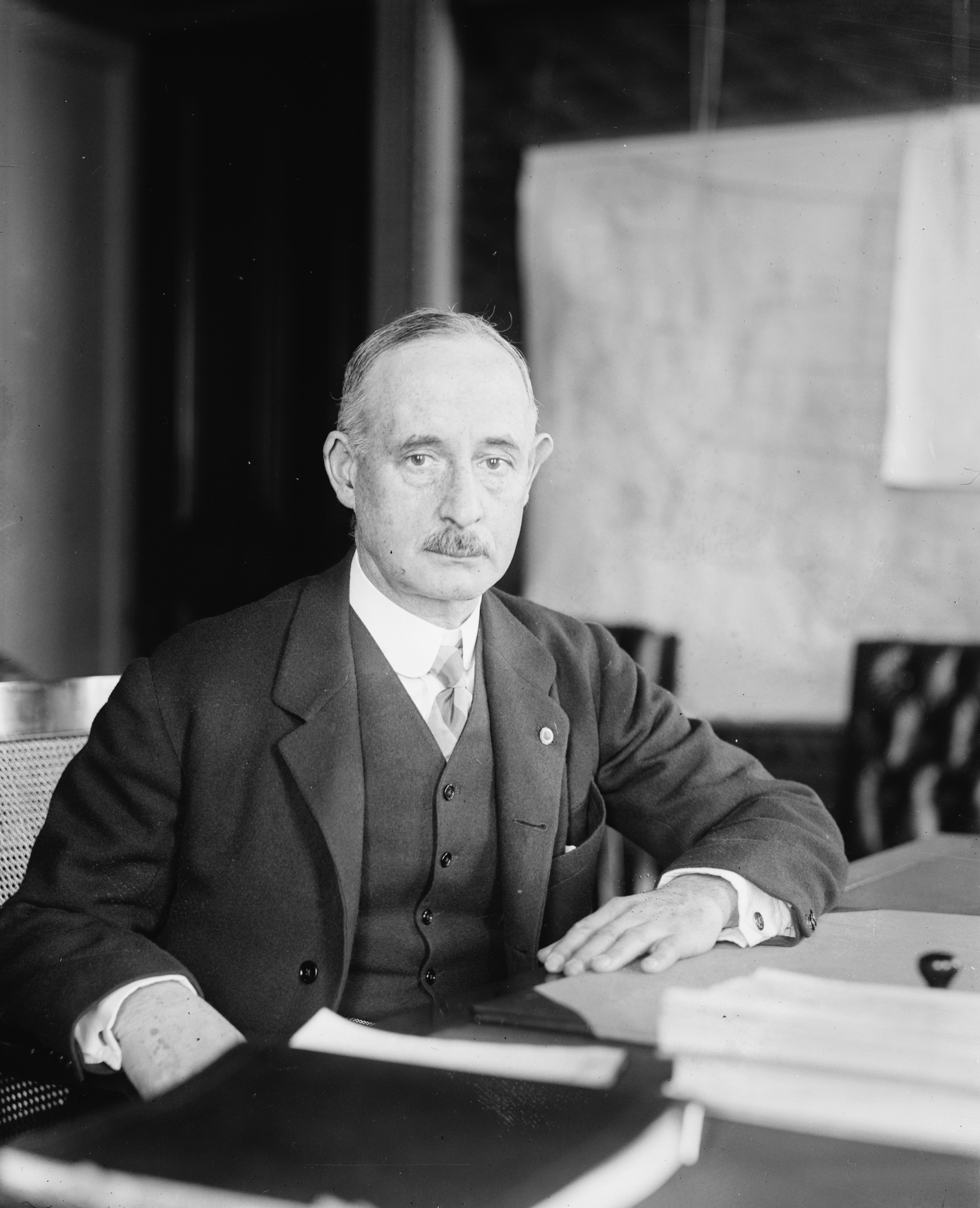
J. Mayhew Wainwright

- Bella Abzug (LL.B. 1945) – congressman from New York (1971–77)
- John J. Adams – congressman from New York (1883–85, 1885–87)
- Victor Anfuso – congressman from New York (1951–53, 1955–63)
- Homer D. Angell (1903) – congressman from Oregon (1939–55)
- Martin C. Ansorge (1906) – congressman from New York (1921–23)
- John Bancker Aycrigg (1818) – congressman from New Jersey (1836–39, 1841–43)
- Lyman E. Barnes – congressman from Wisconsin (1893–95)
- Franklin Bartlett (1873) – congressman from New York (1893–97)
- Edward Basset (1886) – congressman from New York (1903–05)
- Perry Belmont (1876) – congressman from New York (1880–88)
- Augustus W. Bennet (LL.B. 1921) – congressman from New York (1945–47)
- Egbert Benson (B.A. 1765) – congressman from New York (1789–93, 1813)
- Fred Biermann (B.A. 1905) – congressman from Iowa (1933–39)
- Loring Black – congressman from New York (1923–35)
- Robert William Bonynge (LL.B. 1885) – congressman from Colorado (1904–09)
- William Samuel Booze (M.D. 1882) – congressman from Maryland (1897–99)
- Frank T. Bow – congressman from Ohio (1951–72)
- John M. Bowers – congressman from New York (1813)
- Lloyd Bryce – congressman from New York (1887–89)
- Charles Waldron Buckley (Union Theological Seminary 1863) – congressman from Alabama (1868–73)
- Rudolph Bunner (B.A. 1798) – congressman from New York (1827–29)
- Robert Grey Bushong (LL.B. 1906) – congressman from Pennsylvania (1927–29)
- Daniel E. Button (M.A. 1939) – congressman from New York (1967–71)
- Eric Cantor (M.S. 1989) – congressman from Virginia (2001–14)
- John F. Carew (B.A. 1893, LL.M. 1896) – congressman from New York (1913–29)
- Clifford P. Case (LL.B. 1928) – congressman (1945–53) and senator (1955–79) from New Jersey
- Emanuel Celler (1912) – congressman from New York (1923–73)
- John Winthrop Chanler (B.A. 1847) – congressman from New York (1863–69)
- Shirley Chisholm (M.Ed. 1951) – congressman from New York (1969–83); first Black woman elected to congress
- Marguerite S. Church (M.A. 1917) – congressman from Illinois (1951–63)
- Alexander Gilmore Cochran – congressman from Pennsylvania (1875–77)
- James Cochran (B.A. 1788) – congressman from New York (1797–99)
- Frederic René Coudert Jr. (B.A. 1918; J.D. 1922) – congressman from New York (1947–59)
- William Cowger (Navy Midshipmen's School) – congressman from Kentucky (1967–71)
- Robert Crosser (transferred) – congressman from Ohio (1913–19, 1923–55)
- Colgate Darden (1923) – congressman from Virginia (1933–37, 1939–41)
- Frederick Morgan Davenport (1905) – congressman from New York (1925–1933)
- John Delaney (B.S. 1985) – congressman from Maryland (2013–2019)
- Isaac C. Delaplaine (B.A. 1734) – congressman from New York (1861–63)
- Rosa DeLauro (M.A. 1966) – congressman from Connecticut (1991–present)
- James G. Donovan (LL.B. 1924) – congressman from New York (1951–57)
- Helen Gahagan Douglas (Barnard College) – congressman from California (1945–51)
- John G. Dow (M.A. 1937) – congressman from New York (1965–69, 1971–73)
- William Duer (B.A. 1824) – congressman from New York (1947–51)
- P. Henry Dugro (B.A. 1876, law school 1878) – congressman from New York (1881–83)
- Charles T. Dunwell (1874) – congressman from New York (1903–08)
- Millicent Fenwick (B.A.) – congresswoman from New Jersey (1975–1983)
- John Fine (B.A. 1809) – congressman from New York (1839–1841)
- Sidney A. Fine (LL.B. 1926) – congressman from New York (1951–56)
- Hamilton Fish (B.A. 1827) – congressman (1843–45) and senator (1851–57) from New York
- Hamilton Fish II (B.A. 1869, law school 1873) – congressman from New York (1909–11)
- Ashbel P. Fitch – congressman from New York (1887–93)
- Frank T. Fitzgerald (1876) – congressman from New York (1889)
- De Witt C. Flanagan (c. 1892) – congressman from New Jersey (1902–03)
- James Florio (graduate study) – congressman from New Jersey (1975–90)
- Wallace T. Foote Jr. – congressman from New York (1895–1899)
- Aime Forand – congressman from Rhode Island (1937–39, 1941–61)
- George E. Foss (attended) – congressman from Illinois (1895–1913, 1915–19)
- Samuel Fowler – congressman from New Jersey (1889–93)
- Peter Frelinghuysen Jr. (graduate study) – congressman from New Jersey (1953–75)
- Jaime Fuster (LL.M. 1966) – resident commissioner of Puerto Rico (1985–1992)
- Ralph A. Gamble (1912) – congressman from New York (1937–45, 1945–53, 1953–57)
- Jacob Augustus Geissenhainer (B.A. 1858) – congressman from New Jersey (1889–95)
- Fred Benjamin Gernerd (1924) – congressman from Pennsylvania (1921–23)
- Ernest Greenwood – congressman from New York (1951–53)
- Judd Gregg (B.A. 1969) – congressman (1981–89) and senator (1993–2011) from New Hampshire
- Percy W. Griffiths (M.A. 1930) – congressman from Ohio (1943–1949)
- James R. Grover Jr. (1949) – congressman from New York (1963–75)
- Frank Joseph Guarini (Navy Midshipmen's School) – congressman from New Jersey (1979–93)
- Ralph W. Gwinn (LL.M. 1908) – congressman from New York (1945–1959)
- Seymour Halpern (1932–1934) – congressman from New York (1953–1973)
- George Sydney Hawkins (B.A.) – congressman from Florida (1857–1861)
- John Henry Hobart Haws (B.A. 1827) – congressman from New York (1851–53)
- Ken Hechler (M.A. 1936, Ph.D. 1940) – congressman from West Virginia (1959–77)
- Thomas Hedge (LL.B. 1869) – congressman from Iowa (1899–1907)
- Lewis Henry (LL.B. 1911) – congressman from New York (1922–1923)
- Abram Stevens Hewitt (B.A. 1842) – congressman from New York (1875–79, 1881–87)
- Lister Hill (left 1915) – congressman (1923–38) and senator (1938–69) from Alabama
- Ogden Hoffman (B.A. 1927) – congressman from New York (1837–41)
- William Hogan (B.A. 1811) – congressman from New York (1831–33)
- Hal Holmes (B.A. 1927) – congressman from Washington (1943–59)
- William H. Hudnut III (B.D. 1957) – congressman from Indiana (1973–75)
- Theodore Gaillard Hunt (LL.B.) – congressman from Louisiana (1853–55)
- Andy Ireland (graduate studies) – congressman from Florida (1981–93)
- Sara Jacobs (B.A. 2011, M.I.A. 2012) – congressman from California (2021–present)
- Meyer Jacobstein (1904) – congressman from New York (1923–29)
- Jacob Javits – congressman (1947–54) and senator (1957–1981) from New York
- Hamilton C. Jones (1907) – congressman from North Carolina (1947–53)
- Bob Kasten (M.B.A. 1966) – congressman (1975–79) and senator (1981–93) from Wisconsin
- John Kean (1875) – congressman (1883–85, 1887–89) and senator (1899–1911) from New Jersey
- Gouverneur Kemble (B.A. 1803) – congressman from New York (1837–41)
- Martin John Kennedy (1909) – congressman from New York (1930–45)
- Cyrus King (B.A. 1794) – congressman from Massachusetts (1813–17)
- Karl C. King – congressman from Pennsylvania (1951–57)
- Charles Landon Knight (1890) – congressman from Ohio (1921–23)
- Peter H. Kostmayer (B.A. 1971) – congressman from Pennsylvania (1977–93)
- Frank Kowalski – representative from Connecticut (1959–63)
- Theodore R. Kupferman (LL.B.) – congressman from New York (1966–69)
- James J. Lanzetta (1917) – congressman from New York (1933–35, 1937–39)
- George P. Lawrence – congressman from Massachusetts (1898–1913)
- Joshua B. Lee (1924) – congressman (1935–37) and senator (1937–43) from Oklahoma
- John J. Lentz (1883) – congressman from Ohio (1897–1901)
- Montague Lessler (1889) – congressman from New York (1902–03)
- Sander Levin (M.A. 1954) – congressman from Michigan (1983–2019)
- Marcus C. Lisle – congressman from Kentucky (1893–94)
- Henry Carl Luckey (graduate study) – congressman from Nebraska (1935–39)
- George R. Lunn (Union Theological Seminary 1901) – congressman from New York (1917–19)
- Dan Maffei (M.S. 1991) – congressman from New York (2009–11)
- Thomas F. Magner (B.A. 1882) – congressman from New York (1889–95)
- Thomas E. Martin (LL.M. 1928) – congressman (1939–55) and senator (1955–61) from Iowa
- Mitchell May (1892) – congressman from New York (1899–1901)
- Ben McAdams (J.D. 2003) – congressman from Utah (2019–2021)
- Washington J. McCormick (1910) – congressman from Montana (1921–23)
- Thomas McEwan Jr. – congressman from New Jersey (1895–99)
- Joseph McKenna – congressman from California (1885–92)
- John McKeon (1828) – congressman from New York (1835–37, 1841–43)
- Charles F. McLaughlin (1910) – congressman from Nebraska (1935–43)
- Roy H. McVicker (1950) – congressman from Colorado (1965–67)
- Peter Meijer (B.A. 2012) – congressman from Michigan (2021–present)
- Schuyler Merritt (1876) – congressman from Connecticut (1917–31,1933–37)
- Chester Earl Merrow (Teachers College 1937) – congressman from New Hampshire (1943–63)
- Brad Miller (J.D. 1979) – congressman from North Carolina (2003–13)
- Arthur W. Mitchell (attended) – congressman from Illinois (1935–43)
- Donald J. Mitchell (B.S. 1949, M.A. 1950) – congressman from New York (1973–83)
- E. A. Mitchell – congressman from Indiana (1947–49)
- John M. Mitchell (B.A. 1877, law school 1879) – congressman from New York (1896–99)
- James W. Mott (B.A. 1909) – congressman from Oregon (1933–45)
- Karl Earl Mundt (M.A. 1927) – congressman (1939–48) and senator (1948–73) from South Dakota
- Henry C. Murphy (B.A. 1830) – congressman from New York (1843–45, 1847–49)
- Jerry Nadler (B.A. 1969) – congressman from New York (1992–present)
- Henry Nicoll (B.A. 1830) – congressman from New York (1847–49)
- Mary Rose Oakar – congressman from Ohio (1977–93)
- Benjamin Odell – congressman from New York (1895–99)
- David A. Ogden (B.A.) – congressman from New York (1817–19)
- J. Van Vechten Olcott (1877) – congressman from New York (1905–11)
- Beto O'Rourke (B.A.) – congressman from Texas (2013–19)
- George F. O'Shaunessy (1889) – congressman from Rhode Island (1911–19)
- Camilo Osías (1910) – resident commissioner of the Philippines (1929–35)
- Donald Lawrence O'Toole (graduate study) – congressman from New York (1937–53)
- William Claiborne Owens (1872) – congressman from Kentucky (1895–97)
- James Parker (B.A. 1793) – congressman from New Jersey (1833–37)
- Richard W. Parker – congressman from New Jersey (1895–1903, 1903–11, 1914–19, 1921–23)
- Thomas G. Patten (B.A. 1879, law school 1882) – congressman from New York (1911–17)
- Herbert Pell – congressman from New York (1919–21)
- Nathanael G. Pendleton (B.A. 1813) – congressman from Ohio (1841–43)
- William Walter Phelps (1863) – congressman from New Jersey (1873–75, 1883–89)
- Philip J. Philbin (1929) – congressman from Massachusetts (1943–76)
- Otis G. Pike (1948) – congressman from New York (1961–79)
- Jotham Post Jr. (B.A. 1792) – congressman from New York (1813–15)
- Adam Clayton Powell Jr. (M.A. 1932) – congressman from New York (1945–71)
- Henry Jarvis Raymond (LL.B. 1871) – congressman from New York (1865–67); founder of The New York Times
- William Emanuel Richardson (1913) – congressman from Pennsylvania (1933–37)
- Edward Everett Robbins (1884) – congressman from Pennsylvania (1897–99, 1917–19)
- James I. Roosevelt (B.A. 1815) – congressman from New York (1841–43)
- Henry H. Ross (1808) – congressman from New York (1825–27)
- Joseph Rowan (1891) – congressman from New York (1919–21)
- William Fitts Ryan (1949) – congressman from New York (1961–72)
- John C. Sanborn (1912) – congressman from Idaho (1947–51)
- Alfred E. Santangelo (LL.B. 1938) – congressman from New York (1957–63)
- James Scheuer (LL.B. 1948) – congressman from New York (1965–93)
- James P. Scoblick (graduate study) – congressman from Pennsylvania (1946–49)
- Townsend Scudder (1888) – congressman from New York (1899–1901, 1903–05)
- Robert T. Secrest (1943) – congressman from Ohio (1933–42, 1949–54, 1963–66)
- John F. Seiberling (1949) – congressman from Ohio (1971–87)
- Richard C. Shannon (1885) – congressman from New York (1895–99)
- Eugene Siler (attended) – congressman from Kentucky (1955–63, 1963–65)
- William I. Sirovich (M.D. 1906) – congressman from New York (1927–39)
- John Slidell (B.A. 1810) – congressman (1843–45) and senator (1853–61) from Louisiana
- Elissa Slotkin (M.A. 2003) – congressman from Michigan (2019–present)
- Stephen J. Solarz (M.A. 1967) – congressman from New York (1975–93)
- Edward J. Stack (M.A. 1938) – congressman from Florida (1979–81)
- Robert H. Steele (M.A. 1963) – congressman from Connecticut (1970–75)
- Percy Hamilton Stewart (1893) – congressman from New Jersey (1931–33)
- William Sulzer – congressman from New York (1895–1912)
- Jessie Sumner (studied at the law school) – congressman from Illinois (1939–1947)
- Edward Swann (1886) – congressman from New York (1902–03)
- Guy J. Swope – congressman from Pennsylvania (1937–39)
- James W. Symington (1954) – congressman from Missouri (1969–77)
- Charles Phelps Taft (1864) – congressman from Ohio (1895–97)
- Benjamin I. Taylor (1899) – congressman from New York (1913–15)
- John A. Thayer – congressman from Massachusetts (1911–13)
- John R. Thurman (B.A. 1835) – congressman from New York (1849–51)
- Norton Strange Townshend (M.D. 1840) – congressman from Ohio (1851–53)
- Charles Henry Turner – congressman from New York (1889–91)
- Al Ullman (M.A. 1939) – congressman from Oregon (1957–81)
- Ralph E. Updike – congressman from Indiana (1925–29)
- John Peter Van Ness – congressman from New York (1801–03)
- Daniel C. Verplanck (B.A. 1788) – congressman from New York (1803–09)
- Gulian C. Verplanck (B.A. 1801) – congressman from New York (1825–33)
- Peter Dumont Vroom (B.A. 1808) – congressman from New Jersey (1839–41)
- J. Mayhew Wainwright (B.A. 1884, law school 1886) – congressman from New York (1923–31)
- William C. Wallace (1876) – congressman from New York (1889–91)
- George M. Wallhauser – congressman from New Jersey (1959–65)
- James J. Walsh (1879) – congressman from New York (1895–96)
- William L. Ward (B.S. 1878) – congressman from New York (1897–99)
- Charles Weltner (1950) – congressman from Georgia (1963–67)
- Rensselaer Westerlo (B.A. 1795) – congressman from New York (1817–19)
- William H. Wiley – congressman from New Jersey (1903–1907, 1909 1911)
- Harrison A. Williams (1948) – congressman (1953–57) and senator (1959–82) from New Jersey
- Francis H. Wilson (1875) – congressman from New York (1895–97)
- Stewart Lyndon Woodford (B.A. 1854) – congressman from New York (1973–74)
- Herbert Zelenko (1928) – congressman from New York (1955–63)

== Governors ==
- Victor Attah (M.A.) – governor of Akwa Ibom State in Nigeria (1999–2007)
- Willie Blount – governor of Tennessee (1809–1815)
- Steve Bullock (J.D.) – governor of Montana (2013–2021)
- Doyle E. Carlton (LL.B. 1912) – governor of Florida
- DeWitt Clinton (1786) – twice governor of New York (1817–22; 1825–28), U.S. senator, mayor of New York City, main proponent of the Erie Canal
- Lawrence William Cramer (M.A.) – second civilian governor of the United States Virgin Islands (1935–1940)
- Arthur G. Crane (Ph.D. 1920) – acting governor of Wyoming (1949–1951)
- Colgate Darden – governor of Virginia, president of the University of Virginia, chancellor of the College of William and Mary, Democratic congressman from Virginia, namesake of Darden Graduate School of Business Administration
- Gray Davis (Law) – governor of California (1999–2003), lieutenant governor of California (1995–1999), California state controller (1987–1995)
- Howard Dean (GS, pre-med) – former governor of Vermont; chairman of Democratic National Committee
- Thomas E. Dewey (Law 1925) – governor of New York (1943–1955); New York prosecutor and district attorney of New York; Republican candidate for president of the United States in 1944 (against Roosevelt) and in 1948 (against Truman)
- Hamilton Fish (1827) – governor of New York, U.S. senator
- Horace F. Graham (J.D.) – 56th governor of Vermont (1917–1919)
- Judd Gregg (B.A. 1969) – governor of New Hampshire (1989–93), Republican U.S. senator from New Hampshire (1993–2012), U.S. congressman (1981–81)
- Wilford Bacon Hoggatt – governor of Alaska (Territorial)
- Charles Evans Hughes (Law 1884) – governor of New York
- John Jay – governor of New York
- Thomas Kean – governor of New Jersey (1982–1990), president of Drew University, chairman of 9/11 Commission
- Stephen W. Kearney – military governor of California (Territorial)
- John W. King – governor of Rhode Island and jurist
- Madeleine M. Kunin – governor of Vermont, deputy secretary of education in Clinton administration, U.S. ambassador to Switzerland, U.S. ambassador to Liechtenstein
- Ruby Laffoon – governor of Kentucky
- William Langer – 17th and 21st governor of North Dakota, U.S. senator, attorney general of North Dakota
- William Beach Lawrence – acting governor of Rhode Island, lieutenant governor of Rhode Island
- Oren E. Long – tenth territorial governor of Hawaii (1951–1053)
- James L. McConaughy – governor of Connecticut, president of Wesleyan University, Knox College
- James McGreevey (B.A. 1978) – governor of New Jersey (2002–2004)
- Robert B. Meyner – governor of New Jersey
- Wayne Mixson (attended) – 39th governor of Florida, 12th lieutenant governor of Florida
- Alejandro Murat Hinojosa (LL.M.) – governor of Oaxaca
- Evelyn Murphy (M.A.) 67th lieutenant governor of Massachusetts; first woman in history of state to hold a constitutional office (1987–1991)
- George Pataki (Law 1970) – governor of New York (1995–2006)
- David Paterson (B.A. 1977) – first African-American governor of New York; former lieutenant governor of New York
- John Dyneley Prince (M.A. 1898) – acting governor of New Jersey when Governor Woodrow Wilson was out of the state
- L. Bradford Prince – governor of New Mexico Territory
- Franklin Delano Roosevelt – governor of New York
- Theodore Roosevelt – governor of New York
- Charles Wilbert Snow (M.A. 1910) – governor of Connecticut (1946–1947)
- William Sulzer – governor of New York, U.S. congressman (1895–1912)
- Guy J. Swope (SIPA) – acting governor of Puerto Rico
- Rexford Tugwell (Ph.D.) – the last appointed American governor of Puerto Rico (1941–1946)
- Peter Vroom (1808) – governor of New Jersey (1829–32; 1833–36)
- George P. Wetmore (LL.B. 1869) – governor of Rhode Island
- Horace White – governor of New York, lieutenant governor of New York, trustee of Cornell University

== U.S. diplomats ==
- G. Norman Anderson (B.A.) – U.S. ambassador to Sudan (1986–1989)
- Michael Armacost (Ph.D.) – U.S. ambassador to Japan (1989–1993); U.S. ambassador to the Philippines (1982–1984)
- Robert L. Barry (M.A. 1962) – United States ambassador to Indonesia (1992–1995); also U.S. ambassador to Bulgaria
- Vincent Martin Battle (M.A. 1967, Ph.D. 1974) – United States ambassador to Lebanon (2001–2004)
- Richard E. Benedick (B.A.) – former diplomat; chief United States negotiator, Montreal Protocol
- Avis Bohlen (M.A. 1965) – diplomat, United States ambassador to Bulgaria (1996–99)
- Raymond Burghardt (B.A.) – director (1999–2001), and chairman (2006–2016) of the American Institute in Taiwan and U.S. ambassador to Vietnam (2002–2004)
- Arthur Frank Burns (B.A., M.A., Ph.D.) – United States ambassador to West Germany (1981–1985)
- Patricia A. Butenis (M.A.) – U.S. ambassador to Sri Lanka (2009–); U.S. ambassador to the Maldives (2009–); U.S. ambassador to Bangladesh
- Reuben Clark (J.D.) – U.S. ambassador to Mexico (1930–1933)
- William Clark Jr. (M.A.) – U.S. ambassador to India (1989–1992)
- Richard T. Davies (B.A.) – U.S. ambassador to Poland (1973–1978)
- Jonathan Dean (B.A.) – U.S. representative for Mutual and Balanced Force Reductions negotiations 1979–1981
- Christopher Dell (B.A. 1978) – United States ambassador, Republic of Kosovo (2009–); U.S. ambassador to Angola (2001–04); U.S. ambassador to Zimbabwe (2004–07)
- William Joseph Donovan (B.A. 1905, J.D.) – U.S. ambassador to Thailand (1953–1954)
- Millicent Fenwick (B.A.) – U.S. ambassador to the United Nations Agencies for Food and Agriculture (1983–1987)
- Daniel Lewis Foote (B.A.) – U.S. ambassador to Zambia (2017–2020)
- Daniel Fried (M.A.) – U.S. special envoy, Guantanamo, rank of ambassador (2009–); top U.S. diplomat in Europe (2005–09); U.S. ambassador to Poland (1997–00)
- David M. Friedman (B.A.) – U.S. ambassador to Israel (2017–2021)
- James W. Gerard (B.A. 1890) – U.S. ambassador to Germany (1913–1917)
- Henry F. Grady (Ph.D. 1984) – first U.S. ambassador to India (1947–1948); concurrently U.S. ambassador to Nepal (1948); U.S. ambassador to Greece (1948–1950); U.S. ambassador to Iran (1950–1951)
- Gordon Gray III (M.A. 1982) – U.S. ambassador to Tunisia (2009–2012)
- Howard Gutman (B.A. 1977) – U.S. ambassador to Belgium (2009–2013)
- Suzanne K. Hale (B.A.) – former United States ambassador to Federated States of Micronesia (2004–2007)
- Martin J. Hillenbrand (M.A. 1938, Ph.D. 1948) – U.S. ambassador to the Federal Republic of Germany (1972–1976); U.S. ambassador to Hungary (1967–1969)
- John L. Hirsch (B.A.) – U.S. ambassador to Sierra Leone (1995–1998)
- Eric M. Javits (B.A.) – ambassador and permanent U.S. representative to the Conference on Disarmament in Geneva (2001–2003); United States Permanent Representative to the Organisation for the Prohibition of Chemical Weapons (2003–2009)
- Robert G. Joseph (Ph.D. 1978) – former United States special envoy for Nuclear Nonproliferation (rank of ambassador); also under secretary of state for Arms Control
- Ismail Khalidi (Ph.D. 1955) – senior political affairs officer in the department of political and security council affairs for the United Nations
- Madeleine M. Kunin (CSJ) – U.S. ambassador to Switzerland (1996–1999), U.S. ambassador to Liechtenstein (1996–1999)
- Denis Lamb (B.S.) – U.S. ambassador to the Organisation for Economic Co-operation and Development (1987–1990)
- Luis J. Lauredo (B.A.) – U.S. ambassador to the Organization of American States (2001–2003)
- James R. Lilley – U.S. ambassador to China at time of Tiananmen Square (1989–91); U.S. ambassador to Korea (1986–89); director, American Institute in Taiwan (1981–84)
- Harold F. Linder (B.A.) – U.S. ambassador to Canada (1968–1969); president, Export-Import Bank of the United States (1961–1968)
- William H. Luers (M.A.) – U.S. ambassador to Venezuela (1978–82) and U.S. ambassador to Czechoslovakia (1983–86)
- David E. Mark (B.A., LL.M.) – U.S. ambassador to Burundi (1974–77); career minister, U.S. Foreign Service, Germany, Moscow; helped Georgians write their Constitution
- Jack Matlock (M.A. 1952) – U.S. ambassador to the Soviet Union (1987–1991); U.S. ambassador to Czechoslovakia (1981–1983)
- Brett H. McGurk (J.D. 1999) – nominee, U.S. ambassador to the Republic of Iraq (2012); special presidential envoy for the Global Coalition to Counter the Islamic State of Iraq and the Levant (2015–2018)
- Mark C. Minton (B.A.) – U.S. ambassador to Mongolia (2006–2009)
- Hector Morales (B.A.) – U.S. ambassador to the Organization of American States (2008–2009)
- Jim Nicholson (M.A.) – U.S. ambassador to the Holy See (2001–2005)
- B. Lynn Pascoe (M.A.) – U.S. ambassador to Indonesia (2004–07) and Malaysia (1999–01); under-secretary-general of the United Nations for Political Affairs (2007–)
- Mark Pekala (M.I.A. 1983, M.Phil. 1988) – U.S. ambassador to Latvia under President Barack Obama (2012–)
- John Dyneley Prince (M.A. 1898) – U.S. ambassador to Denmark (1921–1926); U.S. ambassador to Yugoslavia (1926–1937)
- Michael A. Raynor (M.A.) – former U.S. ambassador to Benin (2012–2015) and nominee for U.S. ambassador to Ethiopia
- Mitchell Reiss (J.D.) – U.S. special envoy for Northern Ireland (rank of ambassador) (stepped down in 2007); former chief negotiator for the United States in the Korean Peninsula Energy Development Organization
- Julissa Reynoso (J.D. 2001) – U.S. ambassador to Uruguay (2012–)
- Herbert Salzman – U.S. ambassador to the Organization for Economic Co-operation and Development
- William E. Schaufele Jr. (M.A. 1950) – U.S. ambassador to Upper Volta (1969–71); U.S. representative, United Nations Security Council (rank of ambassador) (1971–75); U.S. ambassador to Poland (1978–80)
- Eugene Schuyler (LL.M. 1863) – first American diplomat to visit Central Asia, first U.S. minister to Romania and Serbia, also U.S. minister to Greece
- Sichan Siv (M.A.) – diplomat and former U.S. representative to the United Nations Economic and Social Council (rank of ambassador) (2001–06)
- Elliott P. Skinner (M.A. 1952, Ph.D. 1955) – anthropologist; United States ambassador to Republic of Upper Volta (1966–1969)
- Monteagle Stearns (B.A.) – U.S. ambassador to Ivory Coast (1976–1979); U.S. ambassador to Greece (1981–1985)
- Laurence A. Steinhardt (B.A., M.A., LL.B. 1915) – U.S. ambassador to the Soviet Union (1939–1941); U.S. ambassador to Turkey (1942–1945); U.S. ambassador to Czechoslovakia (1945–1948); U.S. ambassador to Sweden (1933–1937); U.S. ambassador to Peru (1937–1939); U.S. ambassador to Canada (1948–1950)
- Walter Stoessel (graduate study) – U.S. ambassador to Poland (1968–72); U.S. ambassador to the Soviet Union (1974–76); U.S. ambassador to West Germany (1976–80)
- Oscar S. Straus (B.A. 1871, LL.B. 1873) – thrice U.S. ambassador to the Ottoman Empire (1887–1889, 1898–1899, 1910–1912)
- James Daniel Theberge (B.A. 1952) – U.S. ambassador to Nicaragua (1975–1977); U.S. ambassador to Chile (1982–1985)
- Harry K. Thomas Jr. (graduate study) – director general, United States Foreign Service (2007–2009); U.S. ambassador to the Philippines (2010–); U.S. ambassador to Bangladesh (2003–2005)
- Alexander Vershbow (M.A. 1976) – U.S. ambassador to Korea (2005–2008); United States ambassador to the Russian Federation (2001–2005); U.S. ambassador to NATO (1998–2001)
- Ross Wilson (M.A. 1979) – U.S. ambassador to Turkey (2005–2008); U.S. ambassador to the Republic of Azerbaijan (2000–2003)
- Donald Yamamoto (B.A., graduate study) – U.S. ambassador to Ethiopia (2006–09); U.S. ambassador to Djibouti (2000–03); U.S. ambassador to Eritrea ad interim (1997–98)
- J. Owen Zurhellen Jr. (B.A.) – first U.S. ambassador to Suriname (1976–1978)

== Non-U.S. attorneys general ==
- Salahuddin Ahmad (LL.M. 1970) – attorney general of Bangladesh (2008–2009)
- Obed Asamoah (M.A.) – longest-serving foreign minister and attorney general of Ghana under President Jerry Rawlings (1981–1997)
- Jerome Choquette (CBS) – attorney general of Canada, also Canadian minister of justice (1970–1975), minister of education (1975), minister of financial institutions (1970)
- Włodzimierz Cimoszewicz (Fulbright scholar, research, 1980–1981) – public prosecutor general and minister of justice of the Republic of Poland (1993–95)
- Mark MacGuigan (LL.M., J.S.D.) – attorney general of Canada, also Canadian minister of justice (1982–1984); Canadian secretary of state for external affairs (1980–1982)
- Githu Muigai (LL.M. 1986) – current attorney general of Kenya (August 2011–)
- Mikhail Saakashvili (LL.M. 1994) – former minister of justice of Georgia
- Abdul Satar Sirat (B.A.) – former minister of justice of Afghanistan

== Non-U.S. ministers, diplomats and prominent political figures ==
- Madina Abilqasymova (M.I.A. 2003) – minister of labour and social protection of the population of Kazakhstan (2018–2019)
- Ashraf Ghani Ahmadzai (M.A., Ph.D.) – former president of Afghanistan (2014–2021)
- Olubanke King Akerele (M.A.) – Liberian minister of Ffreign affairs (secretary of state) in the cabinet of Ellen Johnson Sirleaf (2007–2010)
- B. R. Ambedkar (M.A. 1915, Ph.D. 1928, LL.D. 1952) – 1st minister of law and justice of India, the architect of the Indian constitution; honoured with the Bharat Ratna
- Emin Amrullayev (M.P.A. 2012) – minister of education of the Republic of Azerbaijan (2020–)
- Gonzalo Aróstegui (B.A.) – key architect, Cuba's Independence Movement; Cuban minister (ambass.) to Germany and the United States (the former, 1912–15)
- Robert Badinter (M.A. 1949) – minister of justice of France (1981–1986)
- Reuben Baetz – Canadian politician, four time cabinet minister in the governments of Bill Davis and Frank Miller
- Deniz Baykal – Turkish politician; Turkish minister of foreign affairs (1995–1996)
- Mohamed Benaissa – minister of foreign sffairs of Morocco (1999–2007); minister of culture of Morocco (1985–1992); Moroccan ambassador to the United States (1993–1999)
- Hans Blix (student and research graduate) – Swedish diplomat, first executive chairman, United Nations Monitoring, Verification and Inspection Commission (2000–03); director general, International Atomic Energy Agency (1981–97); minister of foreign affairs (Sweden) (1976–78)
- Boutros Boutros-Ghali (Fulbright Research Scholar, 1954–1955) – secretary-general of the United Nations (1992–1997); Egypt's minister of state for foreign affairs (1977–1991); Egypt's deputy minister for foreign affairs
- Laurens Jan Brinkhorst (M.A.) Dutch deputy prime minister (2005–06); Dutch minister of Economic Affairs (2003–06); Dutch deputy minister of foreign affairs (1973–77)
- Karin Maria Bruzelius (LL.M. 1969) – Swedish under secretary of state (1989–97) (first woman to hold position), Swedish deputy under secretary of state (1979–83)
- Vincent P. Burke (M.A., Ph.D.) – Newfoundland secretary of education in government of Sir Richard Squires (1927–1935); also member of the Senate of Canada
- Alfonso López Caballero (M.A.) – Colombian minister of the interior (1998); Colombian minister of agriculture (1991–93); held several ambassadorships
- Roberto de Oliveira Campos (postgraduate study) – Brazilian minister of planning for the government of Castelo Branco (1964–67); Brazilian ambassador to the U.S. and U.K.
- Chough Pyung-ok (Ph.D. 1925) – South Korean politician, independence activist
- Simón Alberto Consalvi (M.A.) – Venezuelan politician, twice minister of foreign affairs of Venezuela (1977–1979, 1985–1988); minister of interior and justice of Venezuela (1988–1989); secretary of the presidency (1988); held several ambassadorships
- Nikiforos Diamandouros (M.A., M. Phil., Ph.D.) – ombudsman of the European Union (2003–); national ombudsman of Greece (1998–2003)
- Sir Albert Edward Patrick Duffy – UK politician; president, NATO Assembly in the 1980s; minister of the Navy in the 1970s
- Ernest Eastman – Liberian minister of foreign affairs (1983–1986); minister of state for presidential affairs
- Ingrid Eide (1957–1960) – in Bratteli's Second Cabinet, appointed state secretary in Norwegian Ministry of Church Affairs and Education (1973–76); United Nations official
- Mark Eyskens (M.A. 1957) – Belgian prime minister (1981); Belgian minister of foreign affairs (1989—1992); Belgian minister of Finance (1985—1988, 1980—1981)
- Bassel Fleihan (Ph.D., Economics, 1990) – Lebanese legislator; minister of economy and commerce (2000–2003)
- Keiko Fujimori – president of Peru
- Ibrahim Agboola Gambari – minister of foreign affairs of Nigeria and U.N. under-secretary-general for Political Affairs
- Bernardo J. Gastélum (postgraduate studies in Medicine) – Mexican physician, politician; Mexican secretary of public education (1923)
- Dore Gold (B.A. 1975, M.A. 1976, Ph.D. 1984) – U.S.-born Israeli diplomat, Israel ambassador to the United Nations (1997–1999)
- Emre Gönensay (M.A.) – Turkish politician; Turkish minister of foreign affairs in 1996
- Ronald Green (pre-doctoral level studies) – Dominican politician; minister of education, sports and youth affairs (1995–2000)
- Joseph Rudolph Grimes (M.A.) – second Liberian minister of foreign affairs (1960–1971) (longest serving in history of Liberia)
- Kasım Gülek (Ph.D., economics) – Turkish statesman; Turkish minister of public works, minister of communications, transport minister, and deputy prime minister
- Philip Gunawardena (post-graduate work) – national hero in Sri Lanka; twice cabinet minister in government of Sri Lanka
- Johan Jørgen Holst (B.A. 1960) – instrumental in Oslo Accord; minister of foreign affairs of Norway (1993–94); twice minister of defense of Norway (1986–89, 1990–93)
- Toomas Hendrik Ilves (B.A. 1975) – former president of Estonia
- Radu Irimescu (engineering degree 1920) – Romanian minister of war; minister of the Air Forces
- Eyo Ita – Nigerian politician; one of the prominent founding fathers of Nigeria
- Saeb N. Jaroudi (Ph.D.) – former minister of national economy, industry, and tourism in Lebanon
- Ugnė Karvelis (student of Economics and History, 1957–1958) – permanent Lithuanian ambassador to UNESCO (1993–1997)
- Georgina Kessel (Ph.D.) – Mexican economist; Mexican secretary of energy in cabinet of Felipe Calderón (2006–)
- Kim Hyun-jong (B.A. 1981, M.A. 1982, J.D. 1985) – former South Korean minister of trade (2004–2007; 2017–2019) and special advisor to President Moon Jae-in (2021–)
- Emilio Lozoya (M.B.A.) – Mexican economist and politician, Mexican secretary of energy under President Carlos Salinas de Gortari (1993–1994)
- Gunnar Lund (M.A. 1972) – minister in the Swedish cabinet (2002–2004); Swedish ambassador to France (2007–); Swedish ambassador to the United States (2004–2007)
- Carlos Tello Macias (M.A., Economics, 1959) – Mexican economist, academician; former Secretary of Budget and Planning in the cabinet of José López Portillo; former Mexican ambassador to Cuba, Portugal, and Russia
- Ahmed El Maghrabi (M.B.A.) – minister of housing in Egypt (2005–2010); former Tourism minister
- Jiang Menglin (Ph.D.) – Chinese educator, writer, politician; Ministry of Education (Republic of China) (1928–1930)
- Claude Morin (M.S.W.) – Canadian minister of intergovernmental affairs in cabinet of René Lévesque (1976–1982)
- Eleni Myrivili – United Nations Human Settlements Programme's chief heat officer (2022–)
- Walter Ofonagoro (M.A. 1967, Ph.D. 1972) – Nigerian scholar, politician, businessman; former Minister of Information and Culture, Federal Republic of Nigeria (1995–1998) during presidential period of Sani Abacha
- Ken Ofori-Atta (B.A. 1984) – 17th Ghanaian Minister for Finance and Economic Planning (2017–)
- Michael O'Leary – deputy prime minister of Ireland; Irish Minister of Labour, Minister of Energy
- Geoffrey Onyeama (B.A. 1977) – Nigerian minister of Foreign Affairs (2015–2023)
- Michael Oren (B.A. 1977, M.A. 1978) – Israeli ambassador to the United States (2009–2013)
- James Peterson (Masters of Laws) – retired Canadian politician; former minister of international trade
- Mario Laserna Pinzón (B.A. 1948) – Columbian ambassador to France (1976–1979) and Austria (1987–1990); founder, Universidad de los Andes
- Kyllikki Pohjala (B.S. 1927) – Finland minister of social affairs (1963)
- Carlos P. Romulo (M.A. 1921) – president of the United Nations General Assembly (1949–1950); served eight Philippine presidents from Manuel L. Quezon to Ferdinand Marcos as a cabinet member and as the country's representative to the U.S. or to the United Nations
- Eduardo Verano de la Rosa (M.B.A. 1981) – Colombian minister of environment (1997–1998)
- Mikheil Saakashvili (LL.M. 1994) – minister of justice, Republic of Georgia (2000–2001)
- David Sainsbury, Baron Sainsbury of Turville (M.B.A.) – British politician; life peer (1997–); House of Lords (Labour Party) (as of 2013); minister for science (1998–2006)
- K. L. Shrimali – India parliamentarian and educationist; minister of education in the Union Council of Ministers (1955–1963)
- Abdul Satar Sirat (undergraduate course work in law) – Afghanistan's justice minister (1969–1973)
- Bùi Thanh Sơn (Master of International Relations) – Vietnamese politician; Ministry of Foreign Affairs (Vietnam) (1991–1993)
- Hong Soon-young – retired South Korean diplomat; foreign minister of South Korea (1998–00); unification minister of South Korea (2001–02); held several ambassadorships
- Lorrin A. Thurston (LL.B.) – Kingdom of Hawaii minister of interior (1887–1890)
- Héctor Timerman (M.A. 1981) – Argentine minister of foreign relations (2010–); Argentine ambassador to the United States (2007–2010)
- Sheila Tlou (M.A.) – Botswana specialist in HIV/AIDS, women's health; Botswana minister of health (2004–2008)
- Andrés Velasco (Ph.D.) – finance minister of Chile (2006–2010), during complete presidential period of Michelle Bachelet
- Alexander Vershbow (M.A. 1976 and certificate of the Russian Institute) – deputy secretary general of NATO (2012–); special assistant to the president and senior director, U.S. National Security Council (1994–1997)
- Shirley Williams, Baroness Williams of Crosby (graduate study) – British politician and academic; secretary of state for education (1976–1979), paymaster general (1976–1979), secretary of state for prices and consumer protection (1974–1976); shadow home secretary (1971–1973)
- Nugroho Wisnumurti (J.D. 1973) – ambassador/permanent representative of the Republic of Indonesia to the United Nations (1992–1997); Indonesia's permanent representative to the United Nations and other organizations in Geneva (2000–2004)
- Alexander Nikolaevich Yakovlev – Number 2 in Mikhail Gorbachev Administration; also Soviet ambassador to Canada (1973–1983)
- Salomé Zourabichvili (graduate studies for M.A.) – Georgian politician; minister of foreign affairs of Georgia (2004–2005)

== Military ==
- John C. Acton – retired United States Coast Guard rear admiral; director, Operations Coordination, DHS; served as Director, DHS Presidential Transition Team
- Shlomo Arel M.B.A.) – retired major general in the IDF; the seventh Commander, Israeli Navy; member, Likud party
- Samuel Auchmuty (1775) – British lieutenant general, loyalist during American Revolutionary War, commander-in-chief, Ireland (1882); member, Privy Council of Ireland
- Sidney Bryan Berry (graduate degree, 1951–1953) – retired United States Army lieutenant general; former superintendent of West Point (1974–1977)
- Reid K. Beveridge – retired National Guard of the United States brigadier general; commander, 261st Signal Command
- Roger A. Brady (E.M.B.A. 1994) – former United States Air Force four-star general; last served as the 33rd commander, U.S. Air Forces in Europe
- Kevin P. Chilton (1977) – retired U.S. Air Force four-star general; engineer; former commander, U.S. Strategic Command (2007–11); former NASA astronaut
- Ralph Clem (M.A. 1972; Ph.D. 1976) – decorated USAF major general (retired); Russian specialist; geographer and author
- Henry Eugene Davies – major general, Union Army, American Civil War
- William Joseph Donovan (Wild Bill) (LL.B.) – World War I, World War II hero; only person to receive Medal of Honor, Distinguished Service Cross, Distinguished Service Medal (3), and National Security Medal; also recipient of Silver Star, Purple Heart (2), and IRC's Freedom Award
- Ira C. Eaker (studied Law) – four-star general, United States Army Air Forces during World War II; architect, strategic bombing force; Congressional Gold Medal
- Daniel R. Edwards (CSJ) – Medal of Honor, soldier serving in the U.S. Army during World War I
- Robert J. Elder Jr. (E.M.B.A. 1997) – former lieutenant general, U.S. Air Force; commander, 8th Air Force
- Hamilton Fish II (B.A.) – sergeant, Rough Riders in Spanish–American War; first American killed in Battle of Las Guasimas
- Francis "Gabby" Gabreski (B.A. 1949) – top American fighter ace in Europe during World War II and a jet fighter ace in Korea
- Ulysses S. Grant III (attended until 1898, transferred to West Point) – major general, United States Army
- Francis H. Griswold – United States Air Force lieutenant general; commandant, National War College and vice commander in chief, Strategic Air Command
- Alexander Haig Jr. (M.B.A. 1955) – United States Army four-star general; served as vice chief of staff of the U.S. Army (the second-highest-ranking officer in the Army), and as the 7th Supreme Allied Commander Europe, commanding all U.S. and NATO forces in Europe
- Alexander Hamilton – major general during American Revolutionary War; aide-de-camp and confidant to General George Washington; led three battalions at the Siege of Yorktown; Battle of White Plains, Battle of Trenton, Battle of Princeton, Battle of Monmouth
- Thomas F. Healy (graduate degree) – U.S. Army lieutenant general and former commandant of the Army War College
- Hazel Johnson-Brown (M.A.) – in 1979 became 1st black female general, United States Army; also the 1st black chief, U.S. Army Nurse Corps
- David Kay (M.S., Ph.D.) – United Nations chief weapons inspector, head of Iraq Survey Group
- Philip Kearny (Law 1833) – brigadier general, U.S. Army; notable for his leadership in the Mexican–American War and Civil War
- Stephen W. Kearney – United States Army, brevet major general; conqueror of California in the Mexican–American War; military governor of California (Territory)
- Béla Király (Ph.D. 1962) – Hungarian resistance fighter during World War II; major general in the Hungarian army as well as a military historian, author, and politician
- Alfred Thayer Mahan (1858) – president, U.S. Naval War College, and author of The Influence of Sea Power Upon History
- Harold M. McClelland (attended) – United States Air Force major general, considered the father of Air Force communications
- Mark Milley (M.A. 1992) – 20th chairman of the Joint Chiefs of Staff, 39th chief of staff of the Army
- C. D. Moore (M.S. 1981) – United States Air Force major general; deputy director, Joint Strike Fighter Program
- Otto L. Nelson Jr. (M.A. 1932) – United States Army major general during World War II
- Yuval Neria – professor of medical psychology CUMC Medal of Valor (Israel)
- William Eldridge Odom (M.S. 1962, Ph.D. 1970) – retired U.S. Army lieutenant general; former director of the NSA under President Ronald Reagan
- Frederick C. Painton – WWI veteran, Stars and Stripes reporter, American Legion national publicist, pulp-fiction author, WWII war correspondent (the subject of Ernie Pyle's last column)
- John Watts de Peyster (studied law at the law school, M.A.) – major general during the American Civil War; author on the art of war, one of the first military critics
- Rudolph Douglas Raiford (J.D.) – decorated African-American World War II combat officer who trained and commanded the Infantry Buffalo Division in Italy
- Hyman G. Rickover – U.S. Navy four-star admiral; father, U.S. nuclear submarine fleet, Enrico Fermi Award, Presidential Medal of Freedom (2), Congressional Medal of Freedom
- Julie Roland, aviator and lieutenant commander in the United States Navy
- Theodore Roosevelt – Medal of Honor, awarded posthumously to Colonel Roosevelt (in 2001) for gallantry shown during dual charges up Kettle Hill and San Juan Hill on July 1, 1898 during the Spanish–American War; organized the First U.S. Volunteer Cavalry Regiment, dubbed the Rough Riders by news reporters
- Frederick F. Russell (M.D. 1893) – brigadier general; U.S. Army physician who developed first successful typhoid vaccine in 1909; Public Welfare Medal
- Henry Rutgers (1766) – American Revolutionary War hero; philanthropist; primary supporter of Rutgers College, his namesake (which, in 1924, became Rutgers University)
- Brent Scowcroft (M.A. 1953, Ph.D. international relations 1967) – lieutenant general, United States Air Force; United States National Security Advisor
- Anthony T. Shtogren (M.B.A. 1948) – former major general in the United States Air Force
- William S. Stone (M.A.) – U.S. Air Force major general; third superintendent, U.S. Air Force Academy; air deputy, U.S. Supreme Allied Commander Europe
- Albert Stubblebine (M.S.) – retired major general, U.S. Army; former commanding general, United States Army Intelligence and Security Command
- Robert Troup – lieutenant colonel in American Revolutionary War, aide-de-camp, General Horatio Gates; participated in surrender of General Burgoyne at Battle of Saratoga
- Franklin Van Valkenburgh – Medal of Honor, awarded posthumously; the last captain of the USS Arizona (BB-39) during World War II
- John W. Vogt (M.A.) – four-star general; Purple Heart; commander in chief, U.S. Air Forces in Europe; commander, Allied Air Forces Central Europe
- Charles Wilkes – United States Navy admiral, noted for his 1838–1842 Pacific expedition as well as his role in the Trent Affair during the Civil War
- Samuel V. Wilson – lieutenant general, U.S. Army; director of the Defense Intelligence Agency; coined term "counterinsurgency"
- Richard W. Young (LL.B. 1884) – brigadier general; in Spanish–American War led Utah Light Artillery in Philippines; in World War I led a U.S. artillery brigade in France

== Attorneys ==
- Mark Barnes (LL.M. 1991) – advocate, public healthcare law at the state and national levels; co-founded the first AIDS law clinic
- David M. Becker – two-time general counsel of the SEC
- Richard Ben-Veniste (J.D. 1967) – federal prosecutor (1968–73); chief, Watergate Task Force, Special Prosecutor's Office (1973–75); member, 9/11 Commission (2002–04)
- Moe Berg (J.D. 1930) – spy, Office of Strategic Services (OSS), spoke 12 languages; light-hitting catcher, Brooklyn Robins (1923), Chicago White Sox (1926–30), Cleveland Indians (1931, 1934), Washington Senators (1932–34), Boston Red Sox (1935–39); according to Casey Stengel, "the strangest man ever to play Major League Baseball"
- Preet Bharara (J.D. 1993) – U.S. attorney for the Southern District of New York in the administration of President Barack Obama (2009–2017)
- Naomi Biden (J.D. 2020) – lawyer, associate at Arnold & Porter, granddaughter of U.S. President Joe Biden
- Felix Cohen (1928) – advocate, Native American rights, fundamentally shaped federal Native American law and policy
- Roy Cohn (1947) – conservative lawyer, became famous during investigations of Senator Joseph McCarthy into alleged Communists in U.S. government
- Robert Cover (1968) – civil rights and international anti-violence advocate; professor at Yale Law School
- Paul Drennan Cravath (J.D. 1886) – name partner, New York law firm Cravath, Swaine & Moore
- William Nelson Cromwell (J.D. 1878) – founder, New York law firm Sullivan & Cromwell
- William Joseph Donovan ("Wild Bill") – U.S. attorney for the Western District of New York
- William O. Douglas – third chairman, United States Securities and Exchange Commission; professor, Columbia Law School and Yale Law School
- Julius Genachowski (B.A.) – chairman, United States Federal Communications Commission (FCC) in the Obama Administration, former general counsel, FCC
- Harvey Goldschmid – commissioner, general counsel, special adviser to the chairman, United States Securities and Exchange Commission; professor, Columbia Law
- Slade Gorton (J.D. 1953) – member, 9/11 Commission
- Jack Greenberg (B.A. 1945, LL.B. 1948) – litigator of Brown v. Board of Education; argued 40 civil rights cases before U.S. Supreme Court; professor, Columbia Law
- George Sydney Hawkins (B.A.) – United States district attorney for the Apalachicola District (1841–46); associate justice, Supreme Court of Florida (1846–50)
- Arthur Garfield Hays (1905) – civil liberties advocate; general counsel, ACLU; notable trials included Scopes Trial, trial of Sacco and Vanzetti, Scottsboro case
- Joel I. Klein (B.A. 1967) – United States assistant attorney general under Bill Clinton; won U.S. v. Microsoft; counsel to Bertelsmann
- William Kovacic (J.D. 1978) – chairman (2008–), commissioner (2006–), United States Federal Trade Commission
- William Kunstler (1948) – civil rights and human rights advocate; director, American Civil Liberties Union (ACLU) (1964–1972); co-founded, Center for Constitutional Rights in 1969; self-described radical lawyer; defended numerous controversial clients, including Chicago Seven, American Indian Movement; popular author
- Benjamin M. Lawsky (B.A., J.D.) – first superintendent, New York State Department of Financial Services (2011–); investigated Standard Chartered
- Howard Lesnick (A.B. 1952) Jefferson B. Fordham Professor of Law, University of Pennsylvania Law School
- Harvey R. Miller (J.D. 1959) – New York Times called him "the most prominent bankruptcy lawyer in the nation"
- Dorothy Miner (J.D. 1961, M.S.U.P. 1972) – chief counsel of the New York City Landmarks Preservation Commission
- Leonard P. Moore – U.S. attorney for the Eastern District of New York (1953–1957)
- Annette Nazareth – commissioner, United States Securities and Exchange Commission
- Jim Nicholson – former chairman, Republican National Committee
- Marshall Perlin (1942) – civil liberties advocate; defended Julius and Ethel Rosenberg
- Robert Pitofsky – chairman (1995–2001), commissioner (1978–81), United States Federal Trade Commission
- Frank Polk – name partner, New York law firm Davis Polk & Wardwell
- Simon H. Rifkind – name partner, New York law firm Paul, Weiss, Rifkind, Wharton & Garrison
- Benito Romano (J.D. 1976) – first Puerto Rican to serve as U.S. attorney for the Southern District of New York (on an interim basis)
- James I. Roosevelt (1815) – U.S. attorney for the Southern District of New York (1860–1861)
- Charles Ruff (J.D. 1963) – U.S. attorney for the District of Columbia; in Watergate scandal, fourth and final Watergate special prosecutor
- Whitney North Seymour (1923) – president of the ABA; chairman, New York law firm Simpson Thacher & Bartlett
- John W. Simpson (1873) – a founder of Simpson Thacher & Bartlett
- John William Sterling (1893) – founder, New York law firm Shearman & Sterling; namesake of Yale's library and law building
- Francis Lynde Stetson (1869) – early leader, Davis Polk & Wardwell
- Thomas Thacher (1873) – a founder of Simpson, Thacher & Bartlett
- David G. Trager (1959) – U.S. attorney for the Eastern District of New York (1974–1978); judge, United States District Court for the Eastern District of New York (1993)
- Charles H. Tuttle (B.A. 1899, LL.B. 1902) – U.S. attorney for the Southern District of New York (1927–30)
- Lawrence E. Walsh – independent prosecutor for the Iran-Contra Affair
- Charles Weltner (1950) – advocate, racial equality; second individual to receive the John F. Kennedy Profile in Courage Award
- Mary Jo White (J.D. 1974) – first female U.S. attorney for the Southern District of New York (1993–02); acting U.S. attorney for the Eastern District of New York
- Edward Baldwin Whitney – United States assistant attorney general
- Stewart Lyndon Woodford (B.A. 1854) – U.S. attorney for the Southern District of New York (1877–1883); lieutenant governor of New York (1867–1868); U.S. ambassador to Spain (1897–1898); brigadier general, Civil War

== City government ==
=== Mayors of New York City ===
- DeWitt Clinton (B.A. 1786) – 47th, 49th and 51st mayor of New York City (1803–07, 1808–10, 1811–15)
- Edward Cooper (H.T. 1842) – 83rd mayor of New York City (1879–90) (Note: Cooper was awarded an Honorary Testimonial degree in 1842 for his completion of the "Literary and Scientific Course", offered from 1837 to 1843; he graduated at the top of his class. He was later conferred an honorary master's degree by Columbia in 1845.)
- Bill de Blasio (M.I.A. 1987) – 109th mayor of New York City (2014–21)
- John Ferguson (B.A. 1795) – 52nd mayor of New York City (1815)
- Hugh J. Grant (LL.B. 1878) – 88th mayor of New York City (1889–92)
- William Frederick Havemeyer (B.A. 1823) – 66th, 69th and 80th mayor of New York City (1873–74, 1848–49, 1845–46)
- Abram Hewitt (B.A. 1842) – 87th mayor of New York City (1887–88)
- Seth Low (B.A. 1870) – 92nd mayor of New York City (1902–03); 23rd mayor of Brooklyn (1881–85)
- John Purroy Mitchel (B.A. 1899) – 95th mayor of New York City (1914–17)
- Henry C. Murphy (B.A. 1830) – 5th mayor of Brooklyn (1842)
- Robert Anderson Van Wyck (B.A. 1872) – 91st mayor of New York City (1898–1901); first mayor post-consolidation

=== Other mayors ===
- Horace Carpentier (B.A.) – first mayor of Oakland, California; president of the Overland Telegraph Company
- Jun Choi (M.P.P.A.) – mayor of Edison, New Jersey (2006–2011)
- Jerome Choquette (CBS) – mayor of Outremont, Montreal (Canada)
- May Cutler (M.A.) – Canadian, first female mayor of Westmount, Quebec (1987–1991)
- Karl Dean (B.A. 1978) – sixth mayor of the Metropolitan Government of Nashville and Davidson County, Tennessee (2007–)
- William Sanford Evans (B.A.) – mayor of Winnipeg, MB (1909–1911); leader of Manitoba, Canada's Conservative Party caucus (1933–1936)
- Sun Fo (M.A. 1917) – appointed mayor of Guangzhou (Canton), Republic of China (1920–1922, 1923–1925)
- Eric Garcetti (B.A., M.I.A.) – 42nd mayor of Los Angeles (2013–present), nominee for U.S. ambassador to India
- Susan Golding (M.A.) – two-term mayor of San Diego, California (1992–2000)
- Claudia López Hernández (M.P.A) – 799th mayor of Bogota, senator of Colombia
- Frank S. Katzenbach – former mayor of Trenton, New Jersey
- George Latimer (J.D.) – mayor of Saint Paul, Minnesota, 1976–1990
- Joseph McGoldrick (1922 and 1931) – NYC comptroller and NY State Residential Rent Control commissioner, lawyer, and professor
- Charles Meeker (J.D. 1975) – former mayor of Raleigh, North Carolina (2001–2009)
- Maureen Ogden (M.A. 1963) – mayor of Millburn, New Jersey (1979–1981); deputy mayor (1976–197)
- Henrique Capriles Radonski (attended) – Venezuelan politician; mayor of Baruta, Municipality of Caracas, Venezuela (2000–2008)
- Paul Schell (J.D.) – mayor of Seattle, Washington (1998–2002) during the infamous WTO Meeting of 1999
- Henri Simonet – Belgian politician; mayor of Anderlecht, Belgium (1966–1984); vice-chairman of the European Commission (1973–1977)
- Edward J. Stack (M.A. 1938) – city commissioner-mayor of Pompano Beach, Florida
- Thomas Benton Stoddard – first mayor of La Crosse, Wisconsin, New York lawyer, Wisconsin legislator
- Annette Strauss (M.A.) – former mayor of Dallas, Texas; second female and second Jewish mayor of Dallas
- Percy Sutton (studied law) – Manhattan borough president (1966–1977); longest tenure at that position
- Hsu Tain-tsair (attended) – Taiwanese politician, served as the 15th mayor of Tainan City 2001–2010
- Raymond Tucker (B.A.) – mayor of St. Louis, Missouri (1953–1965)
- Ted Wheeler (M.B.A. 1989) – mayor of Portland, Oregon (2017–)

== Commentators ==
- Dan Abrams (J.D. 1992) – media legal commentator
- Paul Stuart Appelbaum (B.A.) – psychiatrist, commentator and expert on legal and ethical issues in medicine and psychiatry
- Amotz Asa-El (M.A. History and Journalism) – leading commentator on Israeli, Middle Eastern, and Jewish affairs
- Jedediah Bila (M.A.) – conservative political commentator, columnist, culture critic, and author
- Joyce Brothers (Ph.D.) – known as Dr. Joyce Brothers, advice columnist, commentator, and first media psychologist
- Pat Buchanan (CSJ 1962) – conservative columnist, broadcast commentator, author
- Dalton Camp (CSJ) – Canadian journalist, political commentator and strategist, central figure in Red Toryism
- Leonard A. Cole (M.A., Ph.D.) – commentator and expert on bioterrorism and terror medicine
- Lennard J. Davis (B.A., M.A., M.Phil., Ph.D.) – commentator on the intersection of culture, medicine, disability, and biotechnology
- Jim Dunnigan (B.A.) – considered the "dean of modern wargaming", founder of Simulations Publications, Inc. and the most prolific board wargame designer in history; renowned military analyst
- Lawrence Fertig (M.A.) – libertarian journalist, economic commentator
- Mario Gabelli (CBS) – financial commentator
- Ralph Gleason – jazz and popular music critic and commentator
- Keli Goff – political commentator and blogger
- Ellis Henican (M.A.) – commentator, columnist for Newsday and Fox News Channel
- Jim Hightower – liberal political commentator, writer for The Progressive Populist
- Molly Ivins (CSJ) – self-described "left-libertarian" political commentator, newspaper columnist, humorist, bestselling author
- Hilton Kramer – art critic and cultural commentator
- Steve Liesman (CSJ) – senior economic commentator on NBC
- Edward Luck (M.I.A., M.A., M.Ph., Ph.D.) – media commentator on arms control, defense, foreign policy and affairs, as well as United Nations reform and peacekeeping
- Shireen Mazari (Ph.D.) – commentator on global strategic issues affecting peace and security; Pakistani political scientist
- Kenneth McFarland (M.A.) – conservative commentator, public speaker, author, superintendent of Topeka, Kansas school system during Brown v. Board of Education
- John McLaughlin (Ph.D.) – political commentator, host of The McLaughlin Group on PBS
- Julie Menin (B.A.) – television news commentator on politics and the law
- Dick Morris (B.A. 1967) – political commentator and author
- Norman Podhoretz (B.A.) – Presidential Medal of Freedom; editor of Commentary, a founder of Neoconservatism connected with the Project for the New American Century
- Alvin F. Poussaint (B.S. 1956) – commentator on race and American society; well known psychiatrist; author
- James Rubin (B.A. 1982, M.I.A. 1984) – Sky News commentator and television journalist
- Ralph Schoenstein (B.A.) – former commentator on NPR's All Things Considered
- Laura Schlessinger (Ph.D. 1974) – nationally syndicated radio show The Dr. Laura Program; conservative commentator
- Thomas Sowell (M.A.) – economist, conservative social commentator, author
- Ben Stein (B.A. 1966) – conservative economic and political commentator, writer, actor, attorney
- George Stephanopoulos (B.A. 1982) – senior adviser to Bill Clinton, television anchor, media journalist, and political commentator
- Ilan Stavans (Ph.D.) – commentator on American, Hispanic, and Jewish cultures
- Samuel A. Tannenbaum (CSJ) – early commentator on Shakespeare and his contemporaries
- Cenk Uygur (J.D.) – political commentator, internet and television personality, and political activist
- Margaret Hicks Williams, government official, writer, political expert on military intelligence

== Candidates ==
- Nicholas Murray Butler (B.A., M.A., Ph.D.) – vice-presidential candidate with President William Howard Taft in 1912 election (against former President Theodore Roosevelt and Woodrow Wilson)
- D. Leigh Colvin (Law) – Prohibition Party vice-presidential candidate (1920) (lost)
- Thomas Dewey (Law 1925) – presidential candidate in 1944 election (against Franklin D. Roosevelt) and in 1948 (against President Harry S. Truman) in "Dewey Beats Truman" election
- Miguel Estrada (B.A. 1983) – nominee to the United States Court of Appeals for the District of Columbia Circuit
- Matt Gonzalez (B.A. 1987) – Ralph Nader 2008 vice-presidential running mate, former president San Francisco Board of Supervisors
- Judd Gregg (B.A. 1969) – Republican senator from New Hampshire (1993–); nominee for United States Secretary of Commerce in the Democratic administration of President Barack Obama; the senator withdrew his name from nomination on February 12, 2009 (because of widening ideological differences with the administration)
- William B. Hornblower (B.A. 1875) – unsuccessfully nominated to the United States Supreme Court by President Grover Cleveland in 1893
- Charles Evans Hughes (Law 1884) – presidential candidate in 1916 election (against President Woodrow Wilson)
- Franklin Roosevelt (Law) – vice-presidential candidate with James M. Cox in 1920 election (against Warren Harding)
- Theodore Roosevelt (Law) – presidential candidate in 1912 election (against President William Howard Taft and Woodrow Wilson); formed Progressive Party, known as the Bull Moose Party
- Wayne Allan Root (B.A. 1983; same class as President Barack Obama) – journalist, 2008 vice-presidential candidate for Libertarian Party

== Spies (or alleged) ==
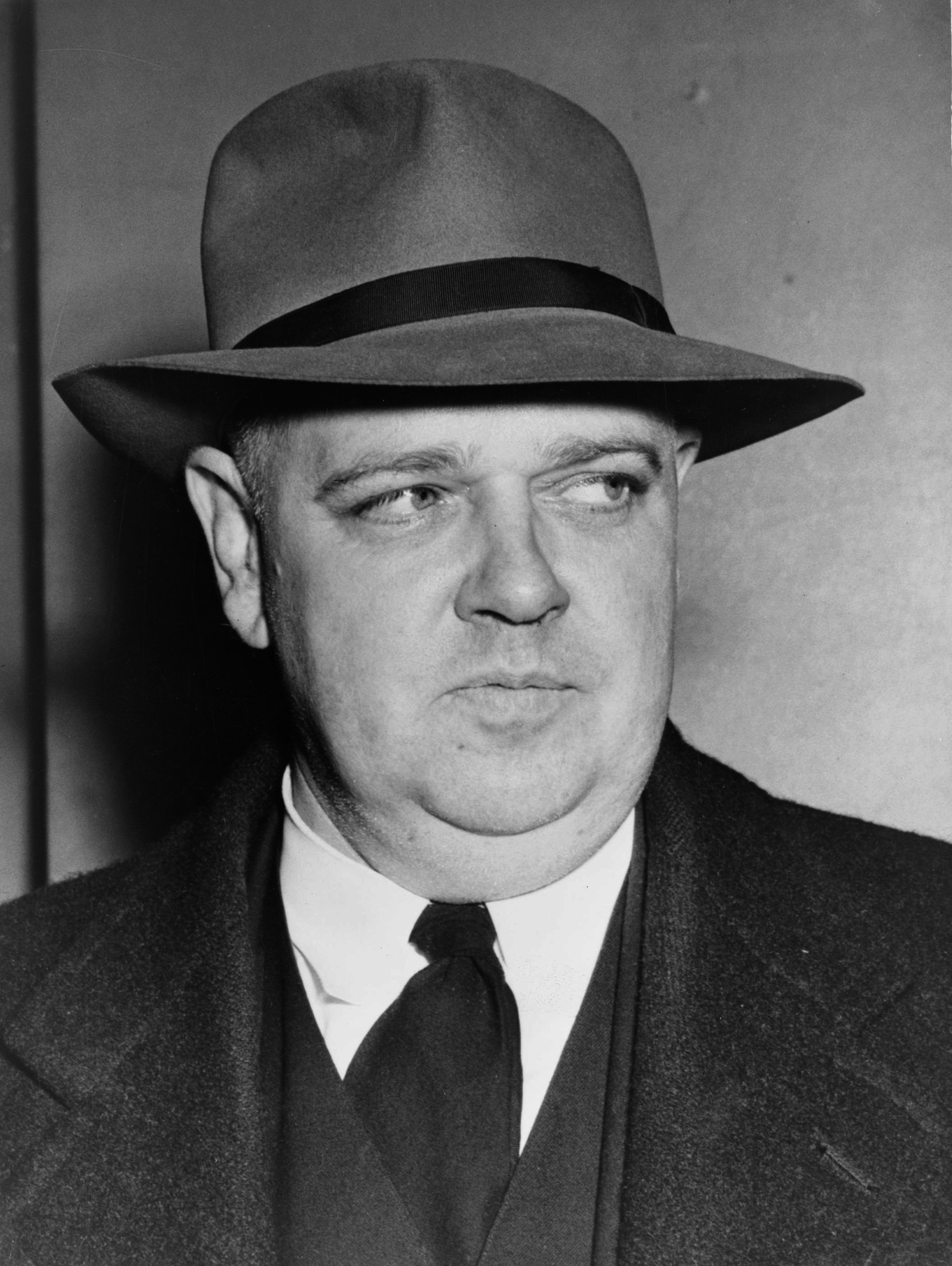
Whittaker Chambers

- Elizabeth Bentley – American spy for Soviet Union 1938–1945; in 1945 she defected from Soviet intelligence and became a key informer for the U.S.
- Whittaker Chambers – admitted Soviet spy in the Ware Group; testified against Alger Hiss
- Morris Cohen – convicted Soviet spy, subject of Hugh Whitemore's drama for stage and TV "Pack of Lies"; instrumental in relaying atomic bomb secrets to the Kremlin in the 1940s, eventually settling in Moscow where for decades he helped train Soviet agents against the West
- William Malisoff (Ph.D.) – alleged Soviet spy, purportedly transferred advanced technology to the USSR
- Hercules Mulligan – American Revolutionary War spy; member of the Sons of Liberty
- Isaiah Oggins (B.A.) – Soviet spy eventually killed by his Soviet masters; subject of the book The Lost Spy: An American in Stalin's Service
- William Perl – alleged Soviet spy convicted for lying about his friendship with executed spy Julius Rosenberg, not convicted of espionage
- Victor Perlo (B.A. 1931, M.A. 1933, mathematics) – alleged Soviet spy involved in Harold Ware spy ring and Perlo group as shown in Venona list of suspected subversives
- Juliet Stuart Poyntz – Communist Party USA founder alleged to have spied for the Soviet OGPU, mysteriously disappeared and presumed killed
- William Remington (M.A. 1940) – alleged Soviet spy killed in prison; convicted of perjury, not convicted of espionage
- Nathaniel Weyl (B.S. 1931) – confessed member of the Ware group of communists who engaged in espionage for the USSR in Washington, D.C.; after leaving the party, he became a conservative and avowed anti-communist
- Harry Dexter White – alleged Soviet spy who spearheaded the creation of the World Bank and the International Monetary Fund; later revealed allegedly to have been involved with the Silvermaster and Ware groups of communist spies while he was a senior U.S. Treasury official in the Franklin D. Roosevelt and Truman administration
- Flora Wovschin – alleged Soviet spy as revealed in the Venona project

== Other ==
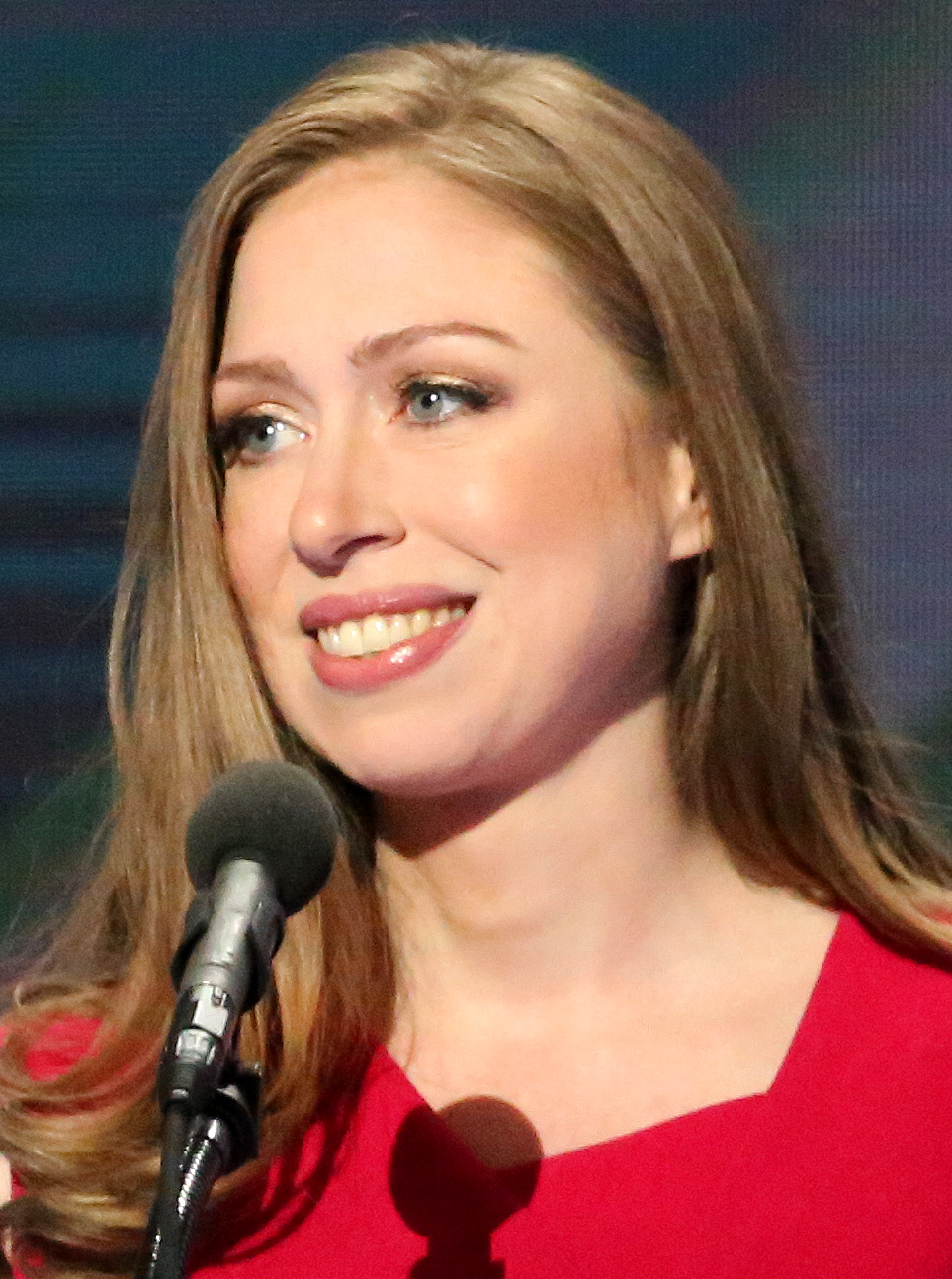
Chelsea Clinton

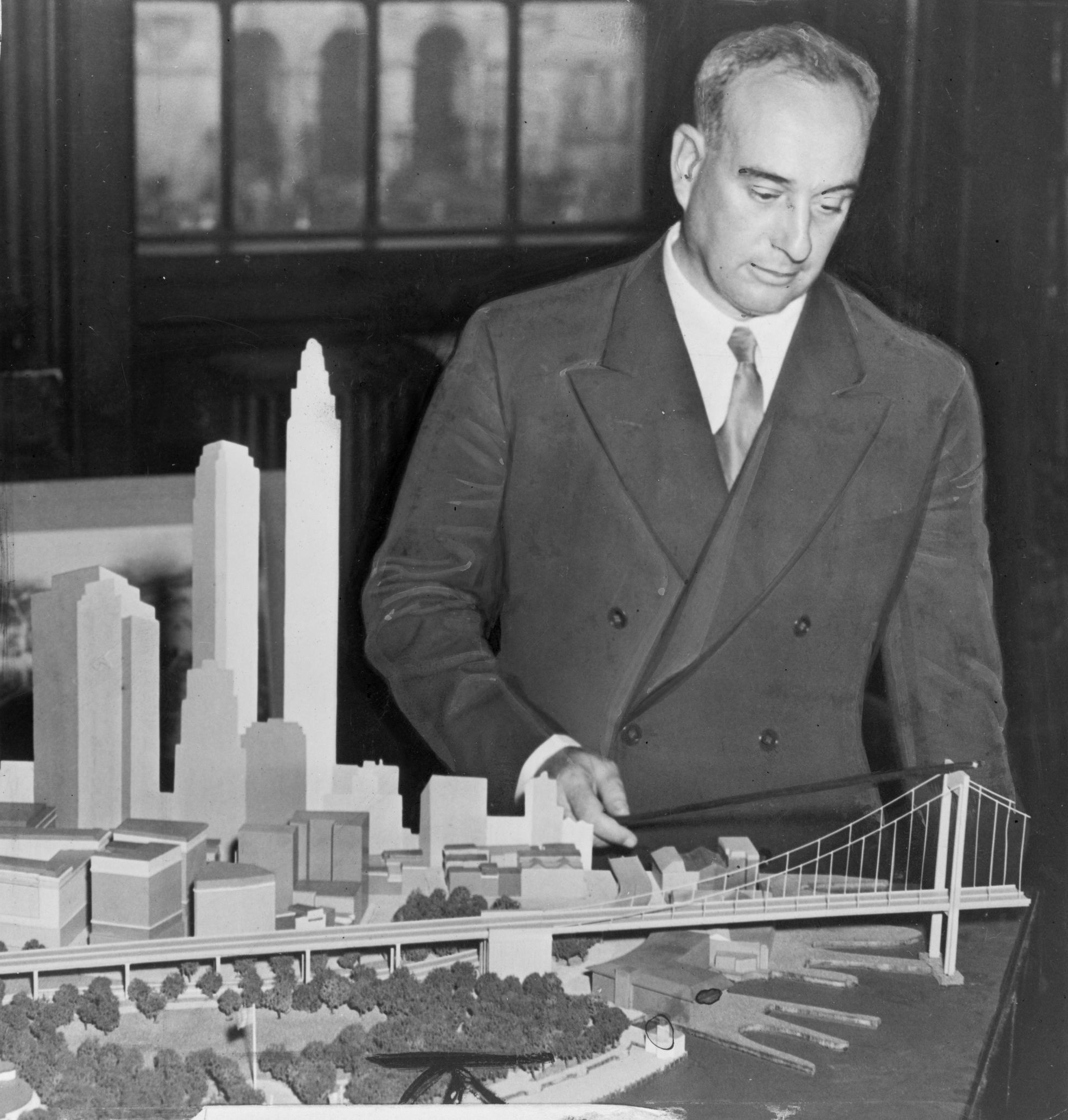
Robert Moses

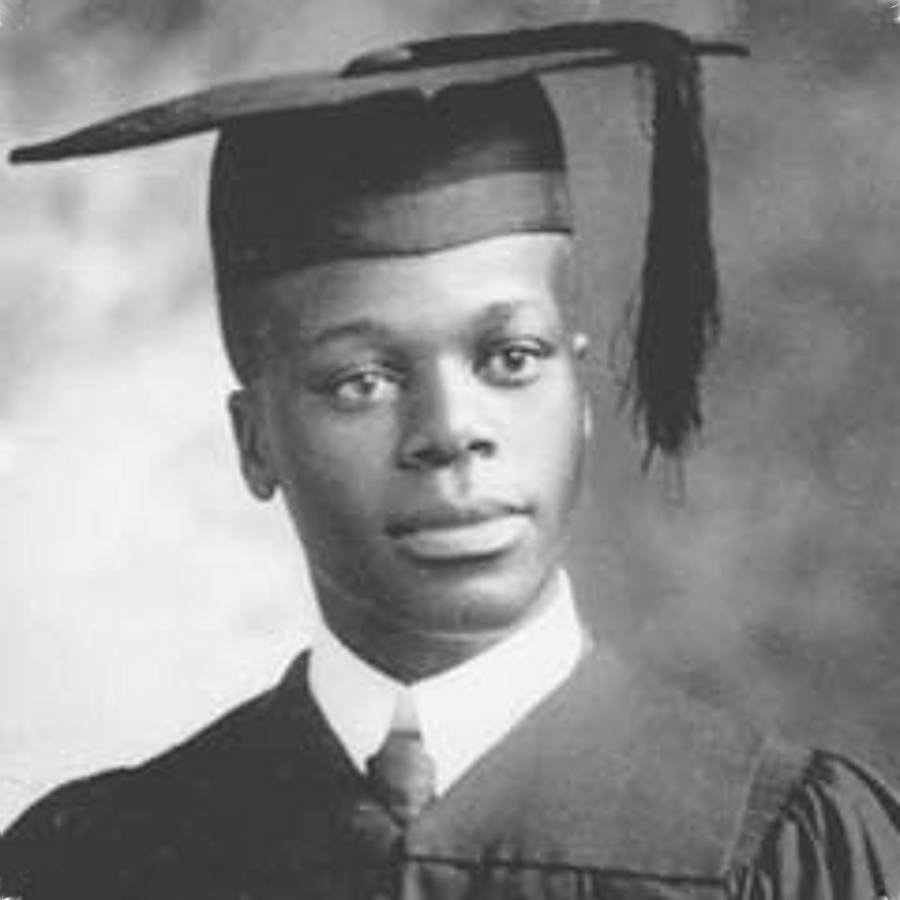
Pixley ka Isaka Seme

- Prince Hussain Aga Khan (M.I.A. 2004) – elder son of Prince Karim Aga Khan IV
- Hong Yen Chang (J.D. 1886) – first Chinese American lawyer in the United States; namesake of Colombia Law School Center for Chinese Legal Studies
- Lewis Stuyvesant Chanler (LL.B. 1891) – lieutenant governor of New York (1907–1908)
- John Ray Clemmons – member of the Tennessee House of Representatives, representing the 55th district, in West Nashville
- Chelsea Clinton (M.A., 2010, university's Mailman School of Public Health)
- Abraham Bogart Conger (B.A. 1831, M.A. 1834) – member of the New York State Senate (1852-1853)
- Henry Cruger – elected to both Parliament of Great Britain (MP, 1774–1780, 1784–1790) and New York State Senate (1792–1796)
- Claudia De la Cruz (M.S.W. 2007) – socialist activist and community organizer
- Jesús Galíndez (Ph.D.) – Spanish writer; during his time at Columbia, a lecturer and student before allegedly being kidnapped and presumably killed by agents of Rafael Trujillo
- Mareva Grabowski-Mitsotakis – (M.I.A.), business executive and spouse of the prime minister of Greece
- Emily Gregory, (MPH) – member of Florida House of Representatives
- Ray William Johnson – internet celebrity; host of internet series Equals Three (did not graduate)
- Ian Kagedan (M.Phil. 1978) – Canadian known for his work on inter-religious and inter-ethnic relations
- Abraham Katz – diplomat, United States ambassador to the OECD
- Caroline Kennedy (J.D. 1988) – co-chair, candidate for Barack Obama's vice presidential search committee; director, Commission on Presidential Debates; adviser, Harvard Institute of Politics; a founder of Profiles in Courage Award; attorney, author
- John H. Langbein (B.A. 1964) – legal scholar and professor at Yale Law School
- Meghan McCain (B.A.) – columnist, author, and blogger
- Betsy McCaughey (Ph.D.) – 72nd lieutenant governor of New York (1995–1998)
- Dianne Morales – non-profit executive and political candidate
- Robert Moses – leader of mid-century urban "renewal" that re-shaped New York
- Dillon S. Myer – director of War Relocation Authority during World War II and commissioner of Bureau of Indian Affairs (M.A. 1926)
- Charles J. O'Byrne (B.A. 1981, J.D. 1984) – secretary to the governor of New York (2008)
- Ralph Perlman (master's in business) – Louisiana state budget director, 1967–1988
- Richard Ravitch (B.A. 1955) – 75th lieutenant governor of New York (2009–)
- Robert Reischauer (M.I.A., Ph.D.) – director of the Congressional Budget Office 1989–1995
- Rebecca Rhynhart (MPA) – Philadelphia city controller 2017–present
- Patricia Robinson (M.A. 1957) – economist and First Lady of Trinidad and Tobago 1997–2003
- Angus B. Rothwell (M.A. 1932) – superintendent of Public Instruction of Wisconsin
- Karenna Gore Schiff (J.D. 2000) – author, journalist, and attorney
- Pixley ka Isaka Seme (B.A.) – founder and president of the African National Congress
- Pierre Sévigny – Canadian soldier, author, politician, and academic; best known for his involvement in the Munsinger Affair
- Thomas Sowell – economist and author
- Don C. Sowers – academic, public servant, consultant

== See also ==
- Columbia College of Columbia University
- Columbia University School of General Studies
- Columbia Law School
- Columbia Business School
- Columbia University Graduate School of Journalism
- Columbia Graduate School of Architecture, Planning and Preservation
- Columbia University College of Physicians and Surgeons
- Columbia University Graduate School of Education (Teachers College)
- Fu Foundation School of Engineering and Applied Science
- Columbia Graduate School of Arts and Sciences
- Columbia University School of the Arts
- School of International and Public Affairs
