= John Sergeant Cram =

American politician (1851–1936)

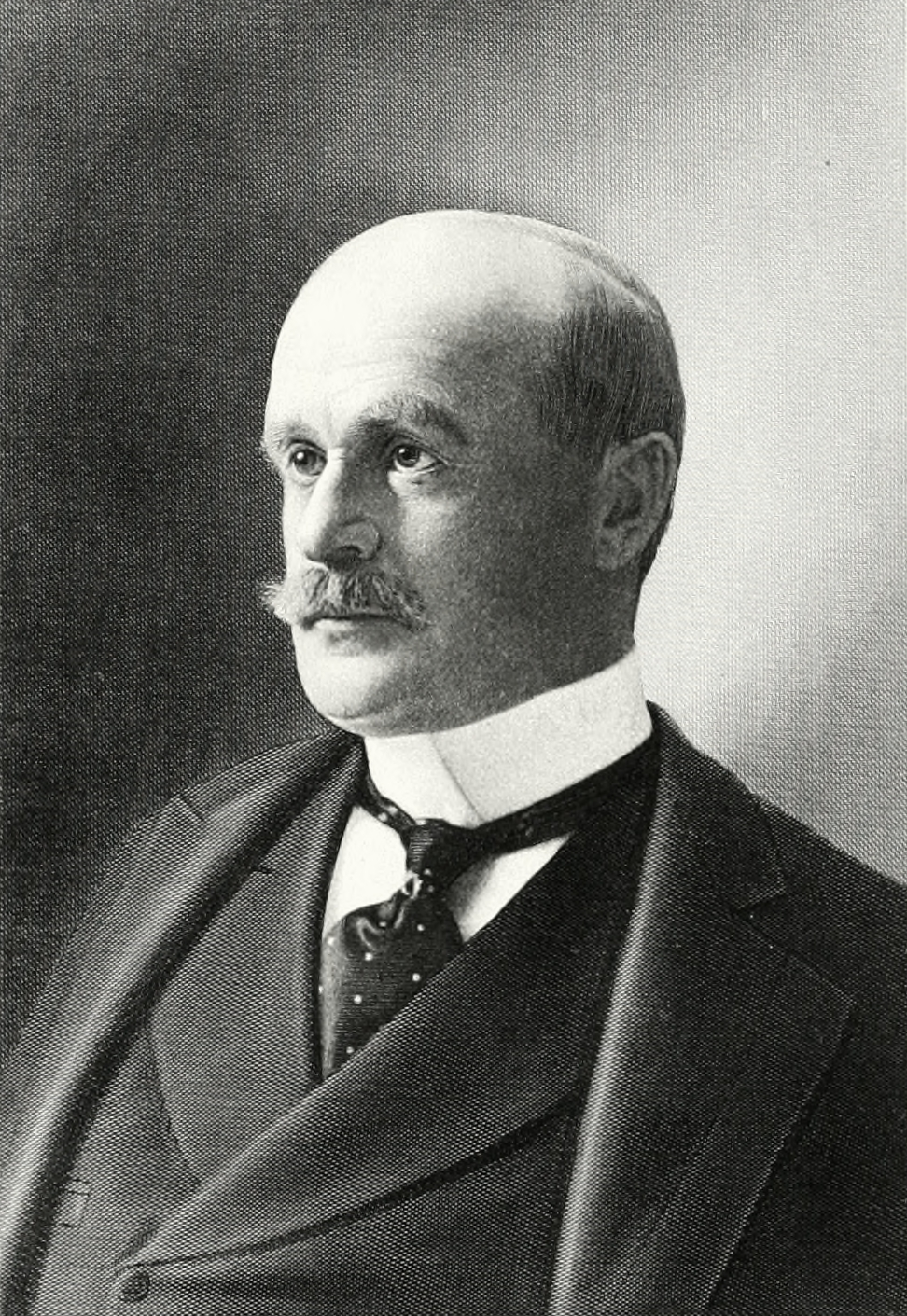

President of the New York Public Service Commission
- In office 1911–1916
- Governor: John Alden Dix; Charles Seymour Whitman
- Preceded by: Edward Bassett
- Succeeded by: Travis Harvard Whitney

President of the Dock Board

Personal details
- Born: May 18, 1851 New York City, New York, U.S.
- Died: January 18, 1936 (aged 84) New York City, New York, U.S.
- Party: Democratic
- Spouse(s): Beatrice Budd Cleland; 1898 (m. 1903, died) Edith Claire Bryce (m. 1906)
- Relations: John Sergeant (grandfather); John Sergeant Wise (cousin); Richard Alsop Wise (cousin); Alexander S. Webb (cousin); H. Walter Webb (cousin); William Seward Webb (cousin)
- Parent(s): Harry Augustus Cram; Katherine Sergeant
- Education: St. Paul's School
- Alma mater: Harvard College; Harvard Law School
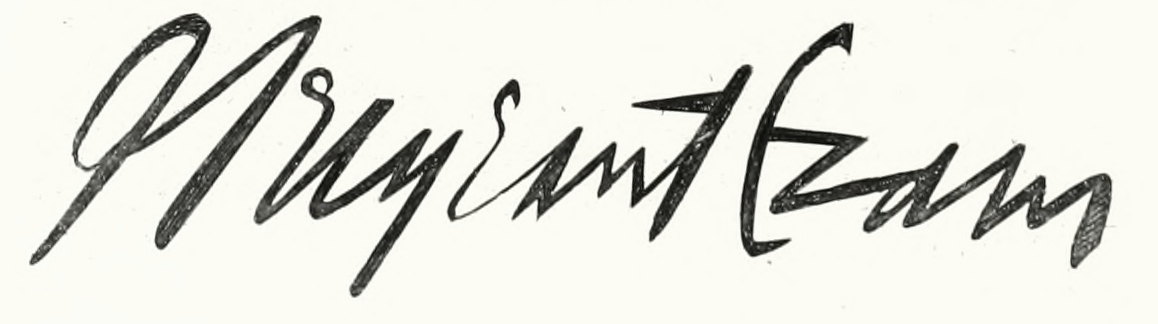
- Signature

John Sergeant Cram Sr. (May 18, 1851 - January 18, 1936) was president of the Dock Board and the head of the New York Public Service Commission.

== Early life ==
Cram was born on May 18, 1851, in New York City. He was the eldest son born to Harry Augustus Cram (1818–1894), a lawyer, and Katherine Sergeant (1825–1910). His maternal grandparents were John Sergeant (1779–1852), a member of the U.S. House of Representatives from Pennsylvania, and Margaretta (née Watmough) Sergeant (1787–1869).

His aunt, Margaretta Sergeant was married to Major General George Meade. Through his aunt, Sarah Sergeant, who married Governor of Virginia Henry A. Wise, he was a first cousin of politicians John Sergeant Wise and Richard Alsop Wise. His uncle was James Watson Webb, the United States Ambassador to Brazil, who married his father's sister, Laura Virginia Cram. Through Webb, he was a first cousin of Gen. Alexander S. Webb, railroad executive H. Walter Webb, G. Creighton Webb, and Dr. William Seward Webb, who married Eliza Osgood Vanderbilt, daughter of William H. Vanderbilt.

== Career ==
He was educated at St. Paul's School and graduated from Harvard College in 1872 and, later, Harvard Law School in 1875. After graduation from Law School, he practiced law with his father at his father's firm.

Cram was first appointed to the Dock Board by Mayor Thomas Francis Gilroy. He was reappointed by Mayor Hugh J. Grant and during the Robert Anderson Van Wyck administration, he was appointed president of the Dock Board.

In 1911, he was nominated by to the New York Public Service Commission by Governor John Alden Dix, with Dix stating:

I know Mr. Cram to be a man of unusual of force and ability and of demonstrated courage and independence. He is a man who accomplishes results, the kind of man the New York City rapid transit situation needs at the present time."

He was confirmed by the New York State Senate over the denunciation of State Senator Josiah T. Newcomb, a Republican who was opposed to the stronghold of Tammany Hall. He was reappointed by Governor Charles Seymour Whitman, serving until 1916 when he was replaced by Travis Harvard Whitney.

He was perhaps best known at the time of his death as the close friend and social advisor to Charles Francis Murphy, the late leader of Tammany Hall.

== Personal life ==
In 1898, he was first married at the age of 47 to the widow Georgiana Beatrice Budd (1875–1903), a daughter of Samuel Budd. She had previously married Clarence Benedict Cleland (1867–1895) in 1894. The marriage to Mrs. Cleland was done without the knowledge his family, with whom he was residing at the time of his marriage. Her father was a haberdasher who supplied Cram, and his fellow members of the exclusive Knickerbocker Club, with his clothing, was a mild scandal at the time for someone of his social prominence.

On January 17, 1906, he married Edith Claire Bryce (1880–1960), the daughter of General Lloyd Stephens Bryce, the United States Ambassador to the Netherlands and Edith (née Cooper) Bryce. Her mother was the only child of New York City Mayor Edward Cooper, himself the son of prominent industrialist Peter Cooper. Her sister, Cornelia Elizabeth Bryce (1881–1960), was married to conservationist Gifford Pinchot (1865–1946), the first Chief of the United States Forest Service under Theodore Roosevelt, in 1914. Her brother, Peter Cooper Bryce (1889–1964), was married Angelica Schuyler Brown (1890–1980), of the Brown banking family, in 1917. Together, they were the parents of:

- Henry Sergeant Cram (1907–1997), who married Edith Kingdon Drexel (1911–1934), the granddaughter of Anthony Joseph Drexel Jr. and George Jay Gould I, in 1930. Cram later married Ruth Vaux, a granddaughter of Richard Vaux, after his first wife's death.
- Edith Bryce Cram (1908–1972), who married Arthur Gerhard in 1950.
- John Sergeant Cram (1910–1997)

He died at his residence, 9 East 64th Street in Manhattan, on January 18, 1936, and was buried in Green-Wood Cemetery. His widow died in 1960.

=== Descendants ===
His grandson, John Sergeant Cram III, was married to Lady Jeanne Campbell (1928–2007), the only daughter from the Duke of Argyll's first marriage. She had previously been married to American writer Norman Mailer. Lady Jeanne and John had several children, including Cusi Cram (b. 1967), an actress, a Herrick-prize-winning playwright, and an Emmy-nominated writer for the children's animated television program, Arthur.
