= Peace House (disambiguation) =

The Peace House, or House of Peace, is a building on the South Korean side of the Korean Demilitarized Zone. It may also refer to:

- Peace House (New York City)
- House of Peace Synagogue in Columbia, South Carolina
- Beit HaShalom (lit from Hebrew House of Peace), a four-story apartment building in Hebron
- Domus Pacis (lit from Latin House of Peace), a pilgrim guest house at the Blue Army of Our Lady of Fátima in Fátima, Portugal

== See also ==
- Dar al-Salam (disambiguation) or Dar es Salam (lit from Arabic House of Peace)
