= Edith Claire Cram =

American pacifist (1880–1960)

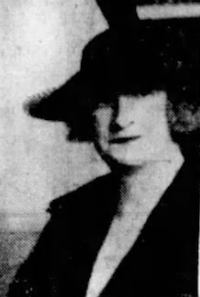
- Born: Edith Claire Bryce; May 6, 1880; New York, New York
- Died: February 28, 1960 (aged 79); New York, New York
- Other names: Mrs. J.S. Cram; Edith C. Cram; Edith Bryce Cram
- Occupations: Philanthropist, pacifist
- Known for: Founder of the Peace House, New York City
- Spouse: John Sergeant Cram
- Children: 3
- Parent(s): Lloyd Stephens Bryce; Edith (née Cooper) Bryce

Edith Claire Cram (née Bryce; May 6, 1880 – February 28, 1960) was an American peace activist and heiress. She founded Peace House, which produced anti-war and peace movement lectures, newspaper advertisements, and other propaganda to promote peace. She was a benefactor for the War Resisters League.

During World War I, she expressed her pacifist views in newspapers in Chicago, New York, and Washington. She wrote an open letter to President Franklin D. Roosevelt during World War II, in which she asked him to mediate. She also promoted women's rights, specifically advocating for birth control. She was on the Advisory Council at Cooper Union for women's educational fields.

== Early life ==
Edith Claire Bryce was born on May 6, 1880, in New York County, New York. Her parents were General Lloyd Stephens Bryce, the United States Ambassador to the Netherlands, and Edith (née Cooper) Bryce, the only child of New York City Mayor Edward Cooper, the son of prominent industrialist Peter Cooper. (Note: She is related to Colonial Governor Robert Brooke Sr. through her father's family.)

The family home, Bryce House, was located in Roslyn on Long Island, New York. Her mother, a millionairess, died on April 29, 1916, leaving a large estate to her family in her will. The main beneficiaries were her brother and her father. Her father died on April 2, 1917, and according to the will, the bulk of the estate, calculated at $6,667,136 in 1918, went to her children and grandchildren, with Peter the main beneficiary. Edith inherited $957,645 (equivalent to $13,220,000 in 2024).

Her sister, Cornelia (1881–1960), was married to conservationist Gifford Pinchot (1865–1946), the first Chief of the United States Forest Service under Theodore Roosevelt, in 1914. Her brother, Peter Cooper Bryce (1889–1964), married Angelica Schuyler Brown (1890–1980), of the Brown banking family, in 1917.

== Pacifist ==
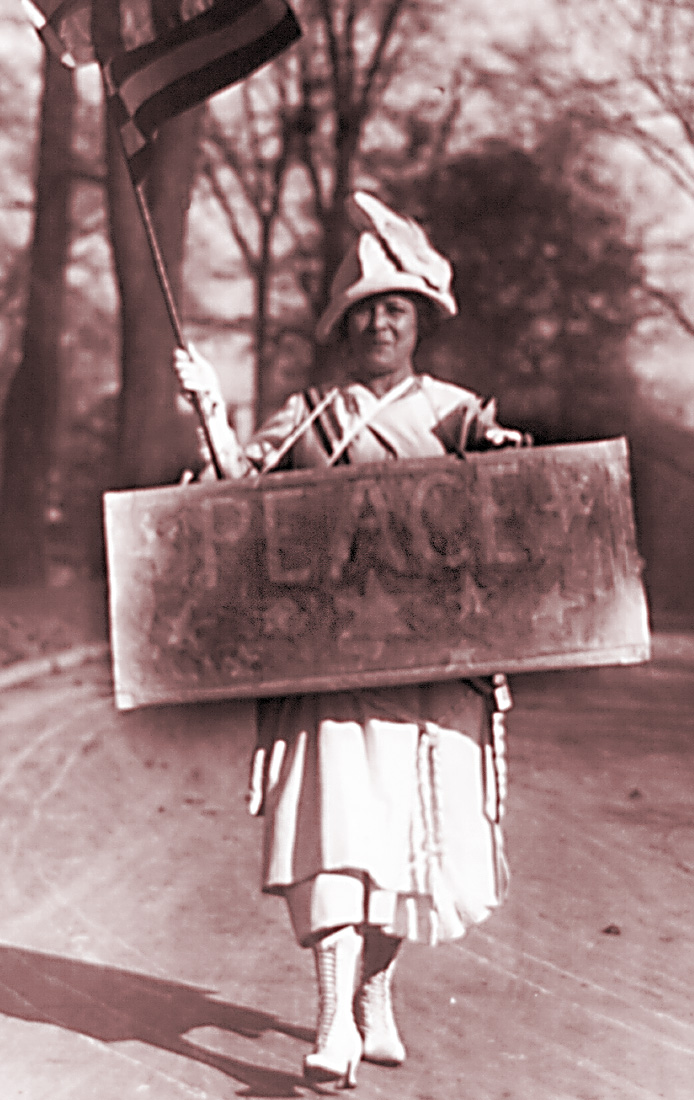
A World War I-era female peace protester

During World War I, she became a pacifist and used the print media to promote her views. She created advertisements and content for religious pages of Chicago, New York, and Washington newspapers. After the French and Belgian invasion of the Ruhr, Albert Einstein expressed his displeasure of the League of Nations' response. She sent a telegram to him in Berlin on April 12, 1923, thanking for his "stand for peace" and offered him a trip to the United States, with expenses paid by two peace societies.

A leader in the pacifist movement, she founded Peace House, dedicated to the advancement of peace. Also engaged in anti-war activities, it was established in 1923 in New York City. The organization conducted plays, lectures, and exhibits. It counseled conscientious objectors. The War Resisters League, of which she was a benefactor, helped her with anti-war advertisements and peace propaganda. Funded totally by her, the Peace House reached millions as the result of its propaganda campaigns. A common message on posters was "Too young to vote but not too young to be killed." During World War II, she advocated for complete neutrality in the armed conflict. She held a meeting at Carnegie Hall in 1939 where senators and representatives of Congress, who wanted to lift the arms embargo, addressed calls for peace. During World War II, she wrote an open letter to President Franklin D. Roosevelt asking him to be a mediator for a peaceful resolution. It was published as an advertisement. Devoted to the pursuit of world-wide peace, she was called a "one-woman campaign for peace". In 1946, the Peace House property was sold.

== Women's rights and education ==
Like her sister Cornelia Bryce Pinchot, she was interested in women's rights, particularly birth control. At Cooper Union, she was on the Advisory Council for the Woman's Art School, School of Secretarial Training, and the School of Telegraphy for Women.

== Personal life ==
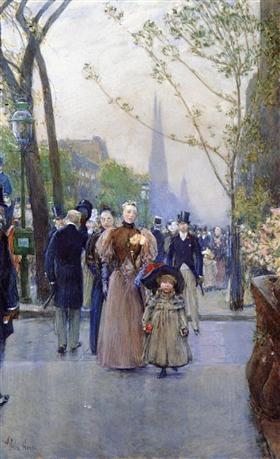
Childe Hassam, Sunday on Fifth Avenue, 1891

She married John Sergeant Cram (1851–1936) (Note: John Sergeant Cram was born in the same year as her father.) on January 17, 1906. He was the chairman of the Democratic National Committee, president of the Dock Board, and the Public Service Commissioner. The Tammany Hall leader, Charles Francis Murphy, was a political intimate.

They had three children. Henry Sergeant Cram (1907–1997) married Edith Kingdon Drexel (1911–1934), the granddaughter of Anthony Joseph Drexel Jr. and George Jay Gould, in 1930. Cram later married Ruth Vaux, a granddaughter of Richard Vaux, after his first wife's death. Their second child, Edith Bryce Cram (1908–1972), married Arthur Gerhard in 1950. Their third child, John Sergeant Cram was born ca. 1910.

She was a member of the Tuxedo Club. In 1920, the Crams were listed in the New York Social Register. They lived in Old Westbury on Long Island and at their residence on Fifth Avenue (across from Central Park) in Manhattan. (Note: The Cram family had seven servants, including a governess, butler, maid, cook, waitress, nurse, and housekeeper.) Her husband died in New York City on January 18, 1936. She lived on East Eighty-fourth Street in New York City, where she died on February 28, 1960. (Note: Her date of death is February 28, 1960 according to The New York Times and the New York City Department of Health. The lineage of Colonial Governors book states that she was born on February 29.) She was buried in Green-Wood Cemetery in Brooklyn, New York.
