= Moses Adams =

American shipbuilder (1837–1894)

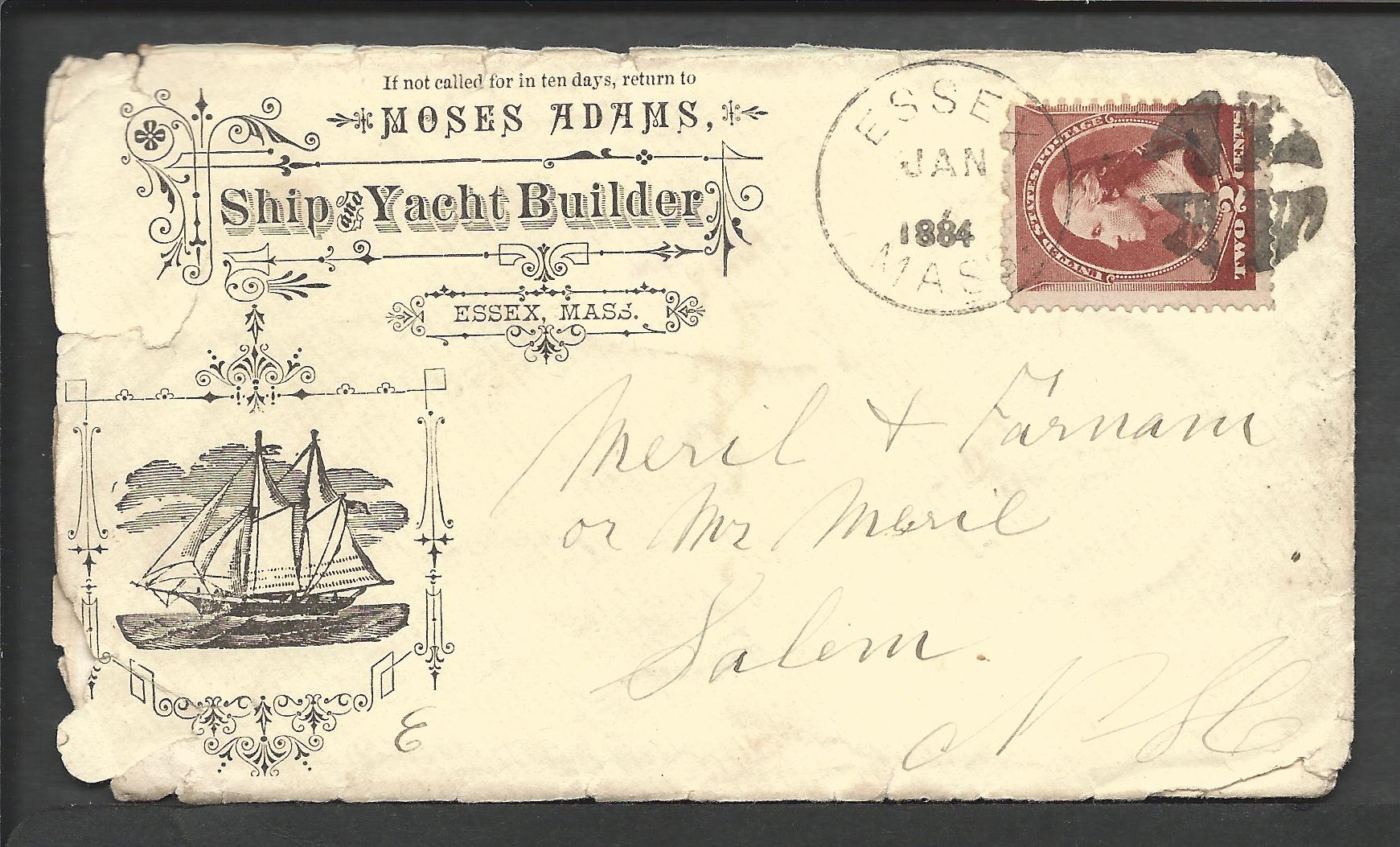
- Moses Adams Ship and Yacht Builder.
- Born: September 12, 1837; Gloucester, Massachusetts, US
- Died: July 16, 1894 (aged 56); Essex, Massachusetts, US
- Occupation: Shipbuilder
- Spouse: Ellen Mears
- Children: 3

Moses Adams (September 12, 1837 – July 16, 1894), was an Essex County shipbuilder. He had his own shipyard and built eighty-five schooners and pilot boats. Adams died in Essex, Massachusetts in 1894.

== Career ==
Moses Adams and Arthur D. Story started a shipbuilding business in 1872 in Essex, Massachusetts. The partnership lasted until 1880, when the two shipbuilders went their separate ways. Adams continued shipbuilding and built eighty-five vessels on his own. In 1881, he built the schooner Ethel B. Jacobs for Captain Sol Jacobs for mackerel fishing.

On August 29, 1882, he launched a 140-ton river steamboat Merrimac for General B. F. Butler from his shipyard. She was the first vessel that was launched sideways from Essex. On March 10, 1884, Adams launched a 120-ton fisherman schooner for Malonson & Co., of Gloucester, Massachusetts. On October 29, 1884, Adams worked on two fishing vessels of 150-tons for J. P. Edwards of Dennis Port, Massachusetts and Fall River, Massachusetts. On December 6, 1884, Adams launched a 130-ton schooner for the Tea Wharf Company of Boston.

In May 1885, Adams built a new schooner Annie Wesley, for Cunningham & Thompson bank halibuting under Captain Henry Thorpe. On March 24, 1886, Adams built a new schooner J. J. Merritt, Jr., for Captain Andrew Leighton for Southern mackerel fishery. She was built after a model by Captain George M. McClain.

In 1888, Adams was the builder for several schooners. The 200-ton fisherman Charles Levi Woodbury, schooner Masconomo, 240-ton schooner for the Atlantic Halibut Company, 110-ton schooner for William H. Jordan, and the 92-ton schooner Horace B. Parker. The Woodbury was built from the model of the J. J. Merritt, Jr., with improvements, for Captain Richard Cunningham. She was named for judge Charles Levi Woodbury. The Parker was built for Captains Chisholm, Thomas and McKinnon.

Moses Adams built the fishing schooner Fredonia in 1889, which was designed by Edward Burgess. The schooner dimensions were 111.6 ft. in length; 23.6 ft. breadth of beam; 10.3 ft. depth of hold; and 58-tons Tonnage. She was a yacht for banker Commodore John Malcolm Forbes of Boston, but later became a Gloucester fisherman schooner. Adams also built the Burgess designed fisherman schooner Nellie Dixon in 1889 from the same plans as the Fredonia. The fishing schooner Harry L. Belden was launched in October 1889 from the Moses Adams yard in Essex for George Clark & Co. Dennison J. Lawlor, was the Boston designer. Also in 1889, Adams built the schooners, Emma E. Wethereil (180-ton), Louise J. Kenney (250-tons), Lizzie Smith (28-tons), steam tug Eben Hodge (75-tons), the 99-ton schooner Quickstep for Cunningham & Thompson, and the schooner Hattie E. Worcester for William H. Jordan.

In 1890, Adams built the 85-ton Elenora for Poole & Hodge. Adams built the 90-ton schooner Emma and Helen for Hon. David J. Robinson for general fishing in August 1891. In November 1891, Adams built a 75-ton unnamed schooner with a radical design for Captain Steele.

In 1892, Adams built the Lizzie B. Adams for Hodge & Pool in honor of the builder's daughter. In June 1892 he built the 108-ton yawl Argo for David Hall Rice. Adams built the 80-ton schooner Edith M. McInnis for Captain John McInnis and Thomas Hodge on June 5, 1893.

=== Pilot boats ===
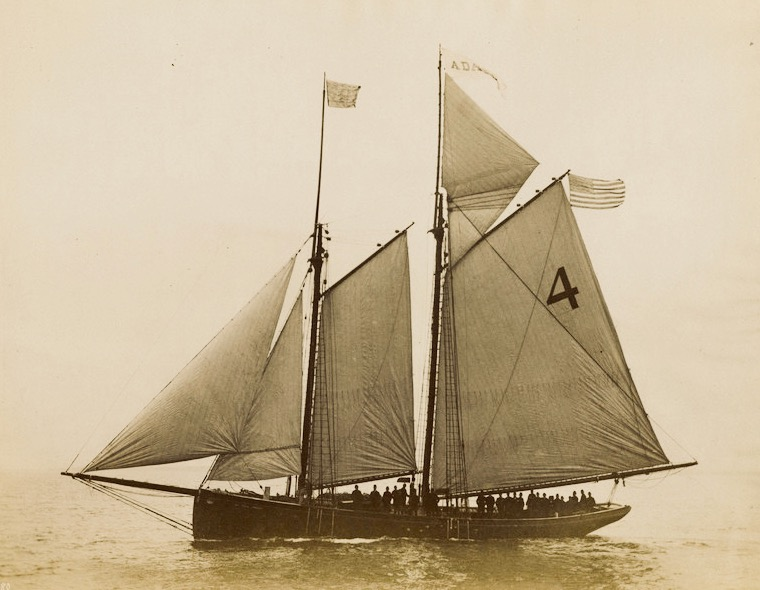
Pilot boat Adams.

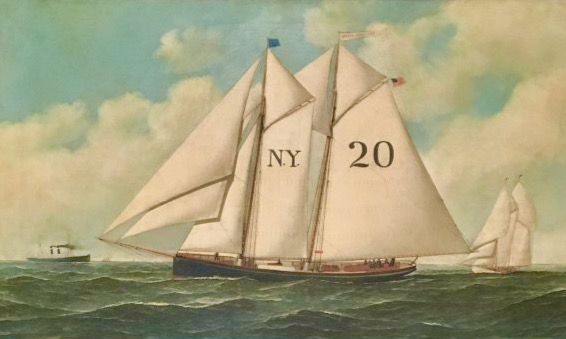
Pilot boat Joseph Pulitzer.

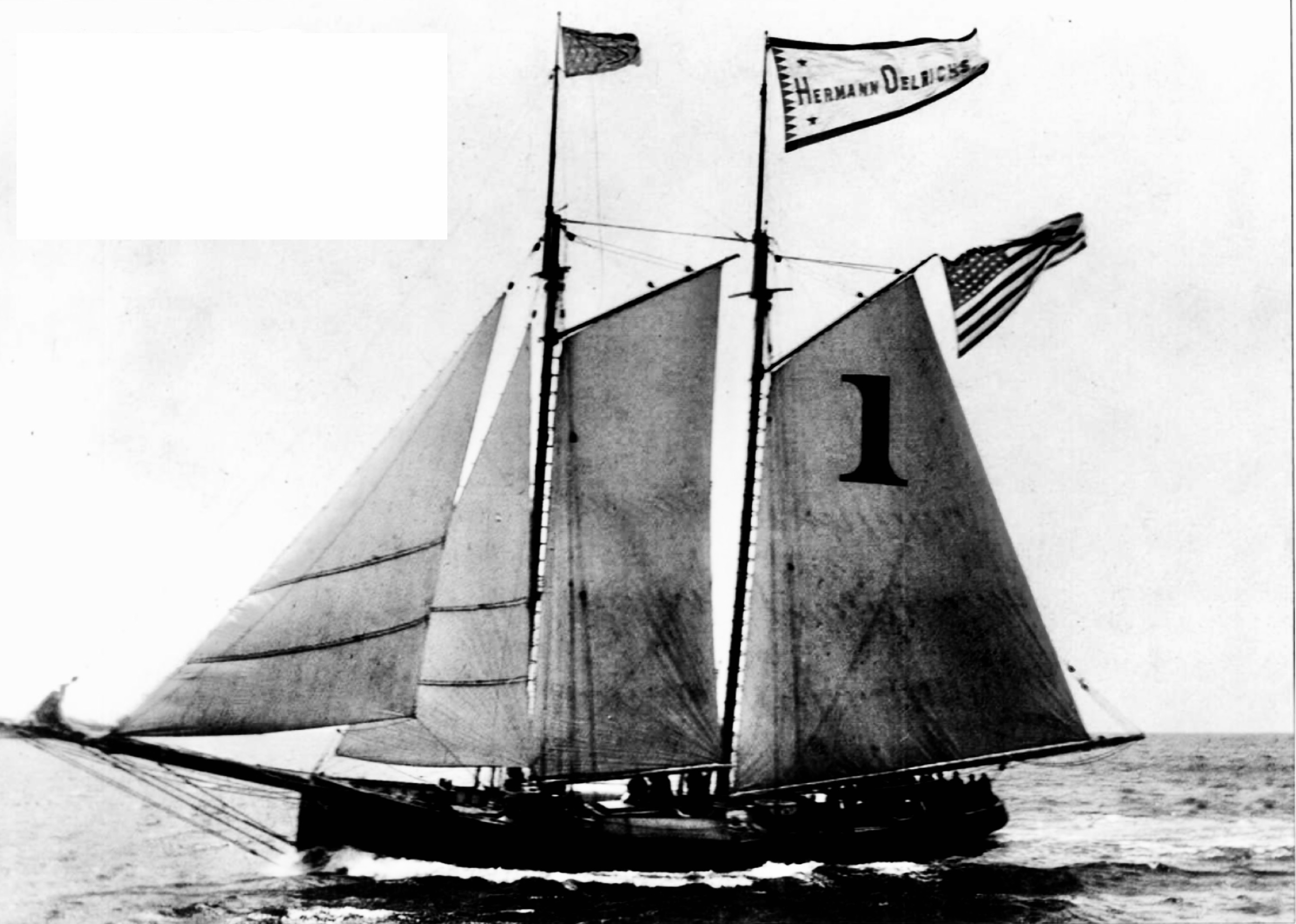
Pilot boat Hermann Oelrichs.

From 1888 to 1894, Adams built three pilot boats. In 1888, he built the 170-ton Boston pilot boat Adams, No. 4, for Captain John H. Jeffries. She was named for Melvin O. Adams, an American attorney and railroad executive. Her design was by Boston yacht designer Edward Burgess, known for his America's Cup defenders. Her dimensions were 88 ft. in length; 22 ft. in width, with 11 ft. in depth of hold; and 150-tons Tonnage. She cost $13,000 to build.

In 1894, Adams built the pilot boat Joseph Pulitzer, No. 20, for New York Pilots. She was a replacement for the Pilot Boat Edward Cooper, that sank off Sandy Hook in 1892. The Joseph Pulitzer was one of the finest and best equipped boats in the service. She was named in honor of Joseph Pulitzer, a New York newspaper publisher. Her dimensions were 97 ft. in length; 22 ft. breadth of beam; 9.4 ft. depth of hold; and 73-tons.

In 1894, he built the New York pilot-boat Hermann Oelrichs, No. 1, to replace the pilot boat Hope. She was said to be the fastest of the New York pilot fleet. Her dimensions were 87 ft. length on deck; her masts were 74 ft. and 72 ft. high; and 73-tons burthen. She beat the Boston pilot boat, Hesper, No. 5, on a race leaving Gloucester.

== Death ==
Moses Adams died, at age 56, on July 16, 1894, in Essex, Massachusetts.

== See also ==
- List of Northeastern U. S. Pilot Boats
