= Dar al-Salam =

Dar al-Salam (Arabic: دار السلام, lit. 'House of Peace'), also transliterated Dar el-Salam, Dar es-Salaam, or Darussalam, may refer to:

== Places ==
- Dar es Salaam, a major city in Tanzania, or the administrative region around it
- Dar El Salam, a town in Egypt
- Dar os Salam, a village in Iran
- Brunei Darussalam, a country in southeast Asia
- Aceh Darussalam, a special administrative region of Indonesia
- Darus Salam Thana, an administrative unit of Dhaka District, Bangladesh
- Dar as-Salam, a nick name for the city of Homs, Syria

== Buildings and institutions ==
- Darussalam Great Mosque, Samarinda, Indonesia
- Darussalam Great Mosque, West Sumbawa, Indonesia
- Dar Es Salam Palace, Rabat in Morocco
- Darussalam Palace in Brunei
- Dar al-Salam Hotel, Tobruk, Libya, meeting place of House of Representatives (Libya)
- Dar Al Salam, a hospital in Iraq
- Dar el Salam General Hospital, a hospital in Egypt
- Al-Salam Mosque, Syria, also known as Dar al-Salam Mosque, in Homs, Syria
- Dar Al-Salam International University for Science and Technology, a university in Yemen

== People ==
- Darussalam (actor) (1920–1993), Indonesian actor

== Other ==
- Dar al-Islam or Dar al-Salam, one of the divisions of the world in Islam
- a layer of Jannah, Islamic paradise
- Daresalam, 2000 film
- Dar Al Salam, an FM radio station in Iraq
- Dar Al-Salam, a newspaper of the Iraqi Islamic Party
- Darussalam Publishers, a Saudi-based publishing house

== See also ==
- Salaam (disambiguation)
- Peace Palace
- Maison de la paix
