= Lloyd Bryce =

American politician (1851–1917)

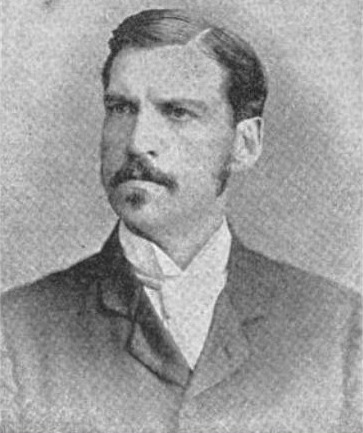

U.S. Minister to Luxembourg
- In office December 7, 1911 – September 10, 1913
- President: William Howard Taft; Woodrow Wilson
- Preceded by: Arthur M. Beaupre
- Succeeded by: Henry van Dyke

U.S. Minister to the Netherlands
- In office November 16, 1911 – September 10, 1913
- President: William Howard Taft; Woodrow Wilson
- Preceded by: Arthur M. Beaupre
- Succeeded by: Henry van Dyke

Member of the U.S. House of Representatives from New York's 7th district
- In office March 4, 1887 – March 3, 1889
- Preceded by: John J. Adams
- Succeeded by: Edward J. Dunphy

Personal details
- Born: Lloyd Stephens Bryce; September 20, 1851 Flushing, New York, U.S.
- Died: April 2, 1917 (aged 65) Mineola, New York, U.S.
- Party: Democratic
- Spouse: Edith Cooper (m. 1879; died 1916)
- Children: 3, including Edith
- Parent: Joseph Smith Bryce
- Education: Georgetown University; Christ Church, Oxford; Columbia Law School

Military service
- Allegiance: United States
- Branch/service: New York State Militia
- Rank: Brigadier General

Lloyd Stephens Bryce (September 20, 1851 – April 2, 1917) was an American diplomat and politician who served one term as a U.S. Representative from New York from 1887 to 1889. He was also an author and magazine editor.

== Early life ==
Lloyd Stephens Bryce was born in Flushing, New York on September 20, 1851. His father, Joseph Smith Bryce (1808–1901), graduated third in his class from the United States Military Academy in 1829, Robert E. Lee was second, and served as a Union Army Major in the Civil War, engaged in the defense of Washington, D.C.

Lloyd's sister was Clemence Smith Bryce, who married Nicholas Fish, the U.S. Ambassador to Switzerland and Belgium, and was the mother of Hamilton Fish II. He was a nephew of John L. Stevens, U.S. Minister to the Kingdom of Hawaii.

He attended Georgetown University, Washington, D.C., and Christ Church, Oxford, where he graduated with bachelor's and master's degrees. Bryce also studied at Columbia Law School.

== Career ==
Bryce was an avid sports enthusiast, and wrote that sports were capable of quelling revolutionary thought among the poor and promoting understanding between nations. He was a frequent participant in polo matches in Newport, Rhode Island and Manhattan and fox hunts on Long Island.

=== Political career ===
Bryce, a Democrat, became interested in politics. In 1886, Governor David B. Hill appointed him to the governor's staff as Paymaster General of the militia with the rank of Brigadier General, a largely ceremonial position. Afterwards he was known as General Bryce.

Bryce was elected as a Democrat to the Fiftieth Congress, serving from March 4, 1887, to March 3, 1889. He was an unsuccessful candidate for reelection in 1888 to the Fifty-first Congress.

He was appointed Minister to the Netherlands on August 12, 1911, and he served until September 10, 1913.

=== Writer and editor ===
His friend C. Allen Thorndike Rice, the editor and owner of the North American Review, died unexpectedly in 1889 and left the magazine to Bryce in his will. Bryce was the owner and editor from 1889 to 1896.

Influenced by his experience in Congress he wrote an early "Yellow Peril" story, called Dream of Conquest for the June 1889 issue of Lippincott's Monthly Magazine. His other published works include: Paradise: A Novel (1888); Romance of an Alter Ego (1889); Friends in Exile (1893); and Lady Blanche's Salon (1899).

== Family ==
In 1879, he married Edith Cooper (1854–1916), the only child of New York City Mayor Edward Cooper, and granddaughter of the famous industrialist Peter Cooper. Together, they were the parents of:

- Edith Claire Bryce (1880–1960), who married President of the New York Public Service Commission John Sergeant Cram (1851–1936)
- Cornelia Elizabeth Bryce (1881–1960), who married conservationist Gifford Pinchot (1865–1946), the first Chief of the United States Forest Service under Theodore Roosevelt, in 1914.
- Peter Cooper Bryce (1889–1964), who married Angelica Schuyler Brown (1890–1980), of the Brown banking family, in 1917.

Bryce died in Mineola, New York, April 2, 1917, and was interred in Greenwood Cemetery, Brooklyn, New York. The bulk of his estate, worth $1,665,061, was left to his two daughters, with his son receiving all his paintings, including a portrait by Godfrey Kneller, books, engravings, and clothing. His home at 1025 Fifth Avenue was left to his children in four equal shares, two to his son and one to each of his daughters.

=== Descendants ===
His grandson, Henry Sergeant Cram (1907–1997), married Edith Kingdon Drexel (1911–1934), the granddaughter of Anthony Joseph Drexel Jr. and George Jay Gould I, in 1930. Cram later married Ruth Vaux, a granddaughter of Richard Vaux, after his first wife's death. His granddaughter, Edith Bryce Cram (1908–1972), married Arthur Gerhard in 1950.

U.S. House of Representatives
Preceded by John J. Adams	Member of the U.S. House of Representatives from New York's 7th congressional district 1887–1889	Succeeded by Edward J. Dunphy
