= Cornelia Bryce Pinchot =

American politician (1881–1960)

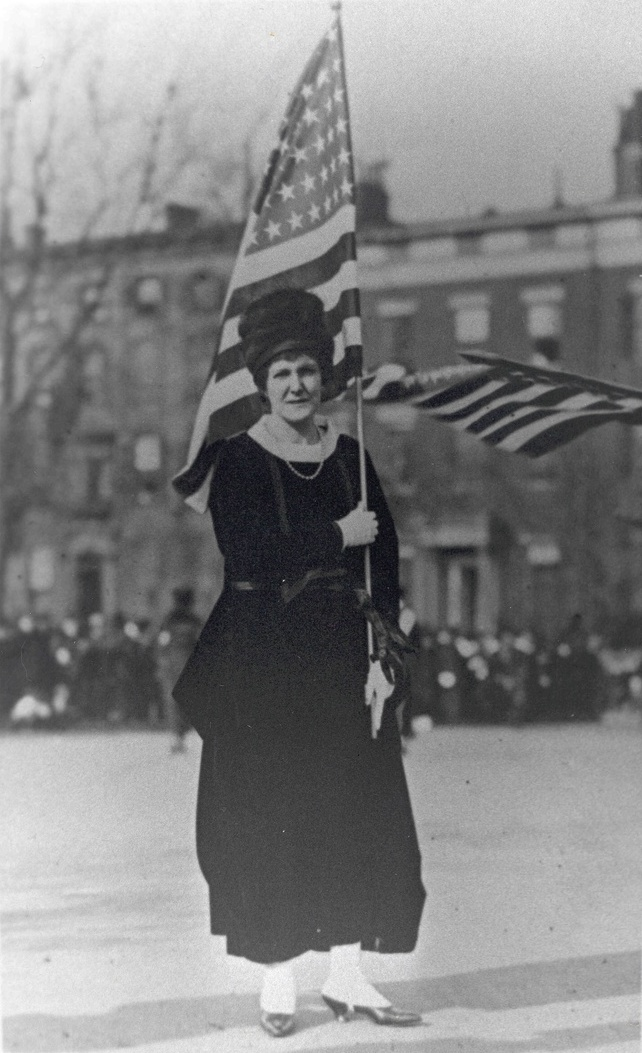
- Pinchot in 1917
- Born: Cornelia Elizabeth Bryce; August 20, 1881; Newport, Rhode Island
- Died: September 9, 1960 (aged 79); Washington, D.C.
- Other names: Leila Bryce, Leila Pinchot
- Occupations: Conservationist, politician, and women's rights activist
- Spouse: Gifford Pinchot (m. 1914; died 1946)
- Children: 1
- Parents: Lloyd Stephens Bryce (father); Edith (Cooper) Bryce (mother)
- Relatives: Gifford Pinchot III (grandson)

Cornelia Elizabeth Bryce Pinchot (August 20, 1881 – September 9, 1960), also known as “Leila Pinchot,” was a 20th-century American conservationist, Progressive politician, and women's rights activist. She was the wife of Gifford Pinchot (1865–1946), the renowned conservationist and two-time Governor of the Commonwealth of Pennsylvania, and was also a close friend of U.S. President Theodore Roosevelt. She was the maternal great-granddaughter of Peter Cooper, founder of Cooper Union, and daughter of U.S. Congressman and Envoy Lloyd Stephens Bryce (1851–1917). She played a key role in the improvement of Grey Towers, the Pinchot family estate in Milford, Pennsylvania, which was donated to the U.S. Forest Service in 1963 and then designated as a National Historic Landmark in 1966

A founding member of the Committee of 100 and major donor to the education and legal defense funds of the National Association for the Advancement of Colored People (NAACP) during the organization's first years of operation, she has been described by historians at the Pennsylvania Historical and Museum Commission as “one of the most politically active first ladies in the history of Pennsylvania.”

== Formative years ==
Born into a wealthy, Victorian-era family in Newport, Rhode Island, in 1881, Cornelia Bryce was a daughter of Lloyd Stephens Bryce (1851–1917) and Edith (Cooper) Bryce (1854–1916), and a great-granddaughter of Peter Cooper, founder of Cooper Union, a science and engineering college in New York City which made its educational offerings available free of charge to every student admitted. Her siblings were Edith Clare Bryce Cram (1880–1960), who later founded a pacifist organization during World War II, and Peter Cooper Bryce (1889–1964), an officer with the U.S. Cavalry who served stateside during World War I.

Among family and friends, Cornelia Bryce was referred to as “Leila.” Educated in private schools and via family trips to Europe, she was reportedly an energetic, independent, and striking woman who “dressed in flamboyant clothes and dyed her hair red.” Her close friend Teddy Roosevelt would grow to admire and later extol her incisive understanding of politics. In 1887, her father was elected to the Fiftieth U.S. Congress. A Democrat, he held that seat until 1889, but was not reelected. From 1889 to 1896, he owned and operated the North American Review, the first literary magazine in the United States.

In 1911, her father was appointed envoy extraordinary and minister plenipotentiary to the Netherlands, a post he held for two years. The following year, she became an outspoken Progressive.

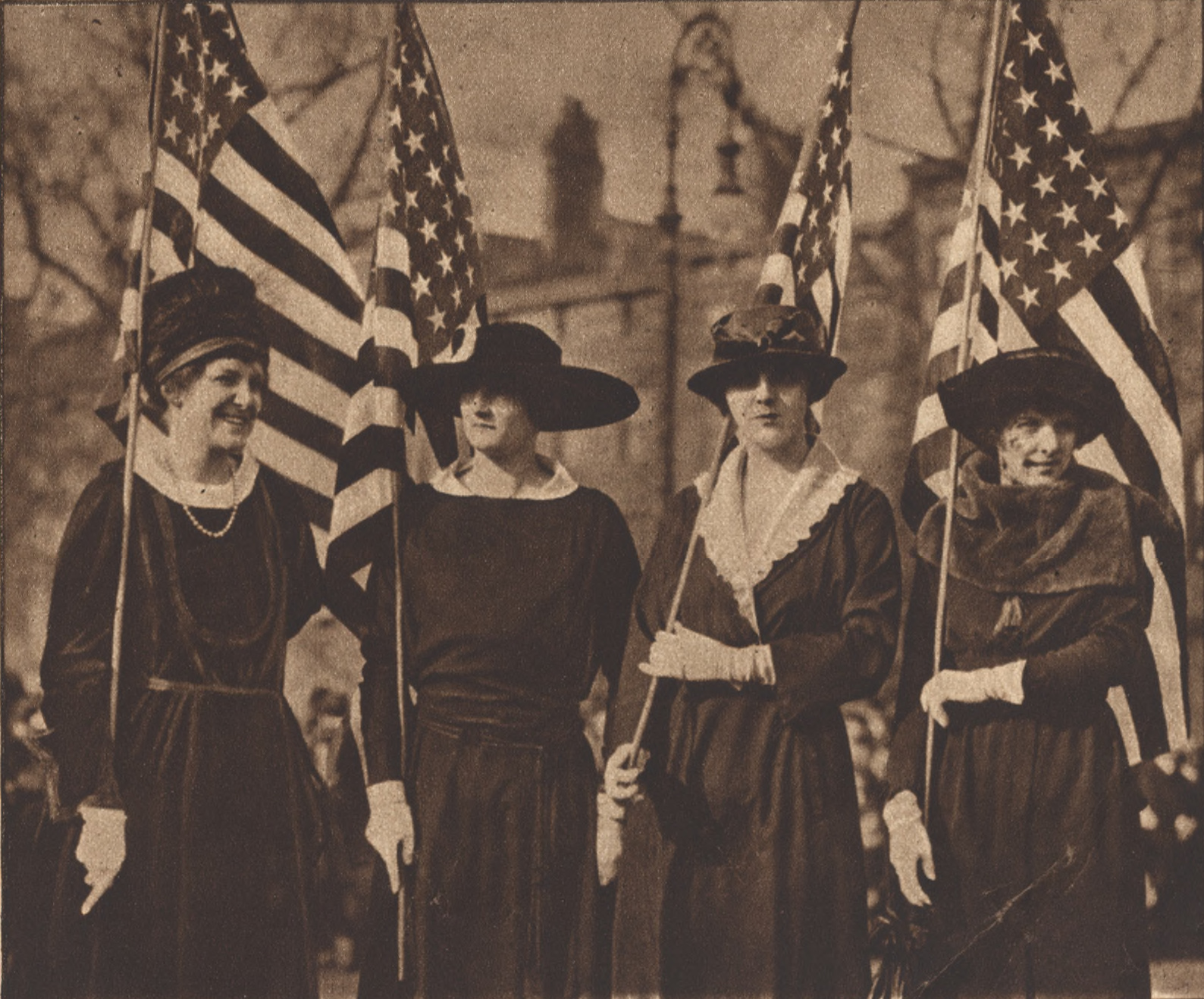
Cornelia Bryce Pinchot, left, with Mrs. J. Gordon Douglas, Mrs. Cornelius Tangeman, and Mrs. Katherine McCook Knox, women's suffrage parade, New York City, 1917.

According to historians at the Grey Towers National Historic Site, Cornelia Bryce's own political career was sparked by the women's suffrage movement—"a cause she supported vigorously.” In addition, she became an early financial supporter of the National Association for the Advancement of Colored People (NAACP), donating $120,000 to its education and defense fund, “spoke out for birth control, women's rights and educational reform and blasted sweat shops and those who abused child labor in the work place,” and became a member of her “local school board, supported prohibition and was one of the first prominent women to take a ride in an airplane.” She also “encouraged women to take an active part in politics and career.”

On August 15, 1914, Cornelia Bryce wed Gifford Pinchot, the first chief of the U.S. Forest Service and a Progressive Party member she had met two years earlier during the “Bull Moose campaign,” an effort by former president Theodore Roosevelt to recruit candidates and other supporters to a third political party he was trying to form in the United States. Her marriage, which was held at her parents' home in Roslyn, New York, was witnessed by Roosevelt and other friends, but her happiness was dampened when her mother-in-law died several days later. Shortly thereafter, her husband and his brother, Amos, inherited their family's estate—Grey Towers—and she and her husband began their tradition of spending summers there.

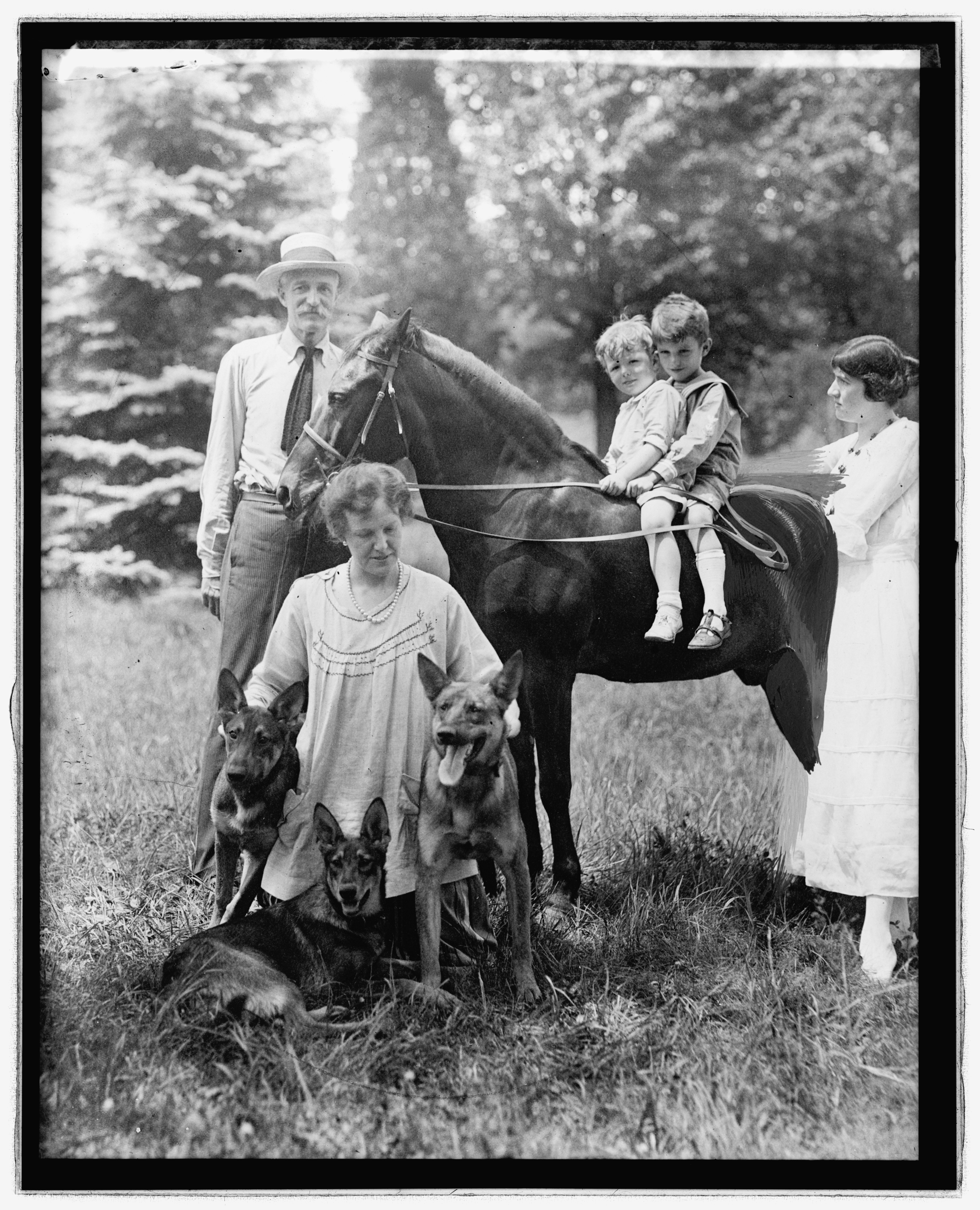
Cornelia Pinchot and family at Grey Towers, Milford, Pennsylvania, c. 1921.

In 1915, Cornelia Pinchot gave birth to her only child—Gifford Bryce Pinchot (1915–1989)—on December 22 in New York City. Raised at Grey Towers, her son would go on to graduate from Yale University (1938) and the Columbia University School of Medicine (1942), and serve in the U.S. Navy Medical Corps during World War II before joining the faculty at Yale and then Johns Hopkins University (1958), where he later became a full professor.

Her parents subsequently died within a year of one another—on April 29, 1916, and April 2, 1917, respectively.

Cornelia Bryce continued to be active in the suffrage movement, serving as secretary of the Pennsylvania Women's Suffrage Association in 1918 and 1919, while the association was lobbying the Pennsylvania state legislature for ratification of the 19th amendment. After its ratification, she became active in the newly created League of Women Voters.

On November 7, 1922, her husband won the Pennsylvania gubernatorial election, becoming the 28th Governor of the Commonwealth of Pennsylvania. She campaigned vigorously for him and played a key role in swaying the women's vote in her husband's favor by securing support from the League of Women Voters and other women's organizations. During his first term in office, her husband succeeded in eliminating a $23 million state budget deficit by reorganizing state government operations. He also worked to improve laws regarding the care and treatment of developmentally disabled and mentally ill Pennsylvanians, as well as the regulation of electric power companies, and also oversaw the creation of a state employee retirement system and a pension plan for other elderly residents of the state. In 1923, he took action to settle a strike by coal miners.

It was during this time of their lives that Cornelia Pinchot assumed management of Grey Towers. Realizing the 43-room fieldstone chateau and its surrounding 102 acres could be a hub for her family's conservation and political activities, she “made sweeping changes in the design and use of the home, making it ‘more fitting as a Governor’s home.’”

She oversaw the transformation of the home’s separate breakfast and dining rooms into a large sitting room and an expansion of the library, and worked with Chester Holmes Aldrich to beautify the estate’s grounds. Aldrich devised a raised, stone-enclosed swimming pool area, a playhouse (the Bait Box) for the Pinchots’ son, a cottage (the Letter Box) for use by her husband's political staff, and a moat, and improved views of the countryside by having masons insert oval apertures in the courtyard's walls.

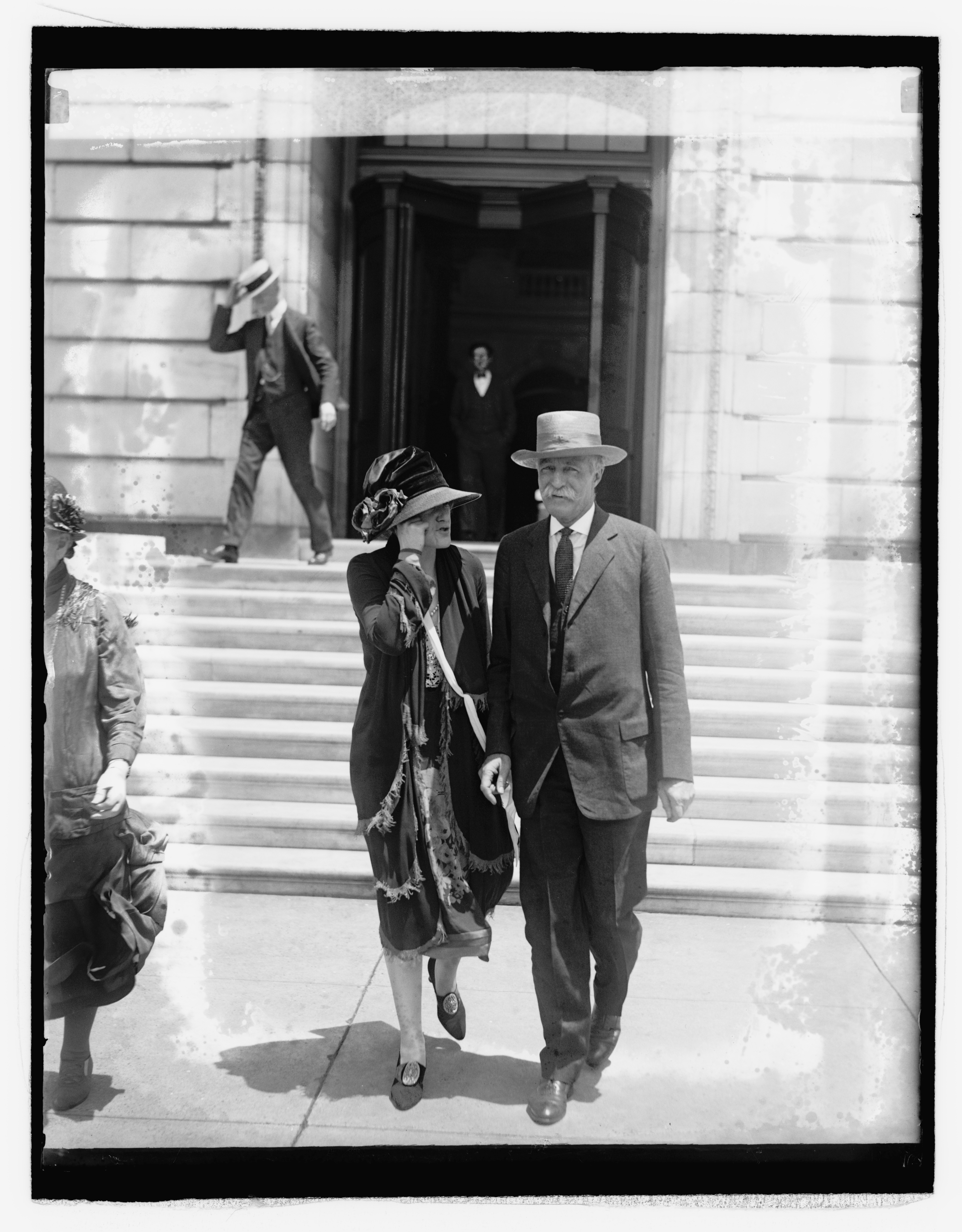
Gov. and Mrs. Gifford Pinchot, Pennsylvania Capitol Building, 1926.

Termed out of office due to Pennsylvania state law which prohibited him from seeking consecutive terms, her husband ran in, but lost, the 1926 U.S. Senate election in Pennsylvania. He then sought and won a second, non-consecutive term as governor, defeating John M. Hemphill in the 1930 Pennsylvania gubernatorial election. He took office during the early part of the Great Depression when the state's unemployment rate was at 11.8 percent—a rate that would climb to 40.2 percent as the nationwide and worldwide financial and social crises deepened, and as the heavily conservative state legislature opposed his efforts to create an unemployment compensation system and other programs to mitigate the depression's impact on residents statewide. Despite this resistance, he instituted a pension program for blind Pennsylvanians, approved regulations to punish banks and corporations for misconduct, established the first environmental protection agency in America and a sanitary water board, launched a transportation initiative that upgraded 20,000 miles of rural roads, reduced utility rates, and repealed voting rights restrictions requiring Pennsylvanians to provide proof of residence by presenting copies of their tax receipts before voting.

Understanding that Pennsylvania's economic recovery would fail if the state failed to improve the quality of life for the commonwealth's poorest residents, Cornelia Pinchot took an active part, as First Lady, in furthering her husband's strategy of “human conservation.”

And she continued to be active in politics in her own right. An advocate for the reform of labor laws, improved educational opportunities for women, and the unionization of tradesmen, she ran for a seat in the U.S. Congress, but lost that Congressional election in 1926 and two others within a ten-year period (in 1928 and 1932). Following her last defeat in 1932 she said "People did not seem as anxious to send me to Congress as I was to go."

“Dressed in red,” in 1933, “she joined the picket lines of teen-age boys and girls who … walked out of (Pennsylvania) textile plants because they [earned] as little as 57 cents a week”:

“With a girl of 14 on one arm and another girl on the other, she tramped up and down past the (shirt) factory, chatted with the marchers and expressed a determination to do everything she could to get the youthful garment workers back into school ‘where they belong.’”

In 1934, she attempted to succeed her husband as governor, but was unsuccessful in her bid for higher office. “If you are a woman and marry a Pinchot, or if you elect to buck the dominant political machine (and one follows the other as the night the day), you must expect to lose just so often—possibly half the time. But it is a good game,” she said, “whether one loses or not."

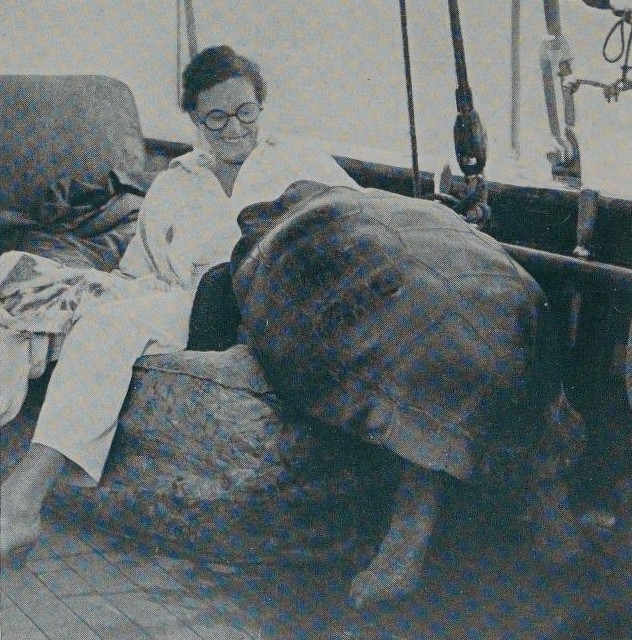
Aboard the expedition vessel with a Galapagos tortoise

But her life was not all politics. In 1929, she traveled with her husband “to the South Sea islands” as part of a seven-month expedition to study “bird and shell life,” and engage in “deep-sea diving, fishing for man-eating sharks and hiking over lava-encrusted volcanoes.” Known today as the Pinchot South Sea Expedition, participants conducted zoological research and collected specimens on behalf of the U.S. National Museum of Natural History. After the Pinchot family returned home, Cornelia Pinchot gave free lectures at schools and movie theaters in conjunction with screenings of a documentary about the expedition that had been filmed by photographer Howard H. Cleaves.

== World War II and later life ==
Shortly after the United States entered World War II, Cornelia Pinchot began volunteering for the Office of Civilian Defense in Washington, D.C., and was appointed as the coordinator of the District of Columbia's food and housing services.

On October 4, 1946, she was widowed by her husband when he died from leukemia at the Columbia-Presbyterian Medical Center in New York City. His remains were returned to Pennsylvania for burial at the family's mausoleum at the Milford Cemetery, not far from Grey Towers. Three years later, she was one of the speakers who addressed the audience assembled on June 15, 1949, for the renaming of the Columbia National Forest to the Gifford Pinchot National Forest.

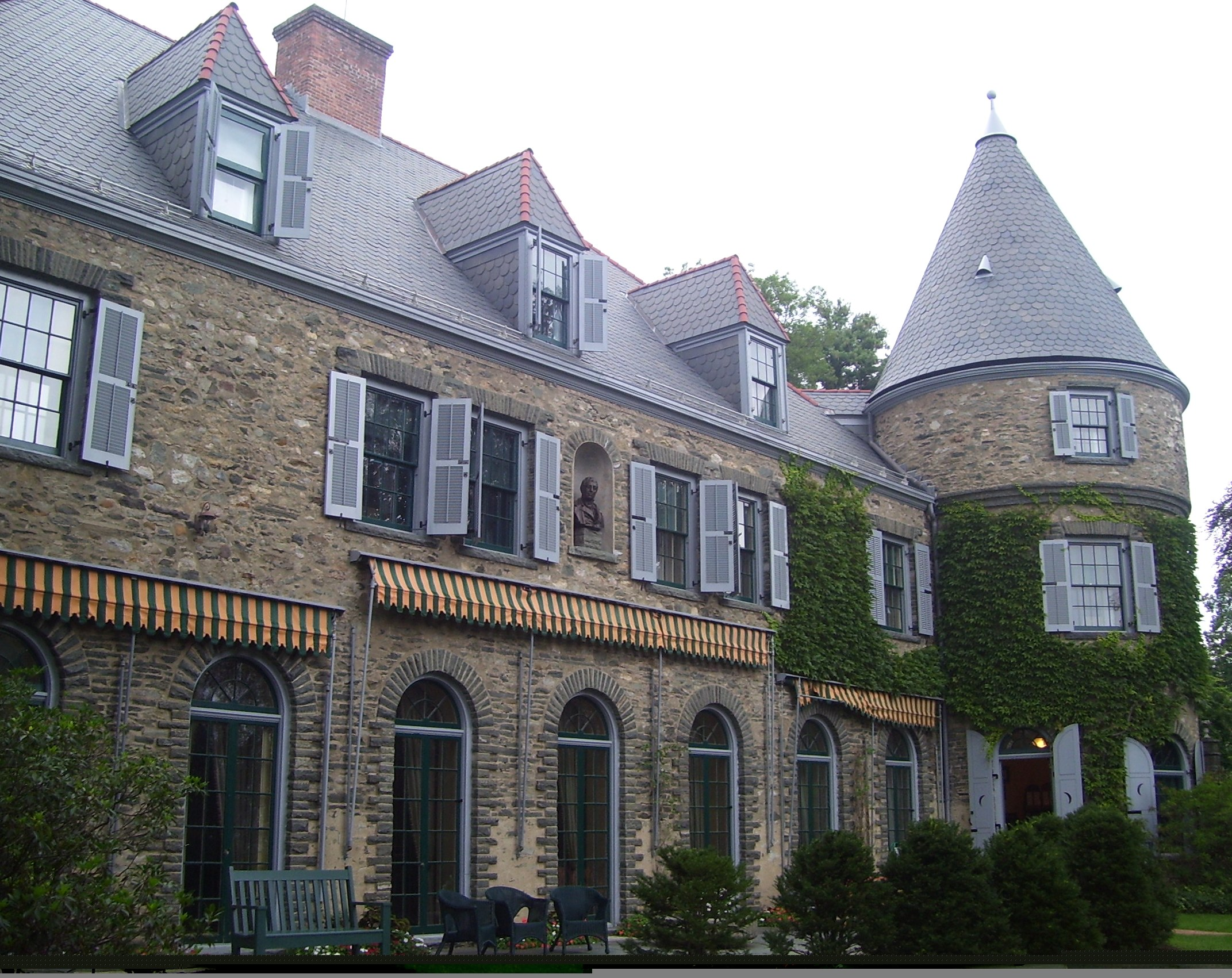
Grey Towers, front facade, 2011.

Post-war, she traveled across Europe to study the difficulties European leaders were having in feeding and providing services for the large number of children and adults made homeless by the war. In 1949, she was appointed as a delegate to the United Nations Scientific Conference on Conservation and Utilization of Resources.

In 1955, she worked with staff of the U.S. Forestry Service to prepare a series of radio broadcasts to increase public awareness about the importance of conservation.

== Death and interment ==
Cornelia Bryce Pinchot died from arteriosclerosis on September 9, 1960, at her home at 1615 Rhode Island Avenue N.W. in Washington, D.C. Funeral services were held in the city at St. John's Episcopal Church, Lafayette Square on September 12 at 2 p.m., followed by a second service the next day at Church of the Good Shepherd in Milford, Pennsylvania.

She was interred at the Milford Cemetery in Milford.
