= Joseph Pulitzer (pilot boat) =

Boston Pilot boat

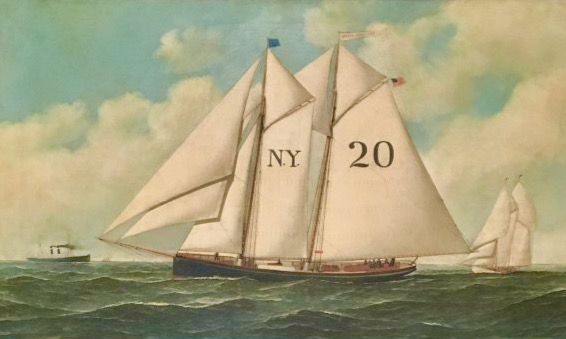
- New York pilot boat Joseph Pulitzer, No. 20 (painting by Antonio Jacobsen.

History

United States
- Name: Joseph Pulitzer
- Namesake: Joseph Pulitzer, newspaper publisher
- Owner: Jacob M. Heath, John Ronayne, Thomas Marks, Frederick Ryerson, Martin Ryerson, and Jacob P. Lockman
- Operator: Jacob M. Heath
- Builder: Moses Adams
- Launched: 21 February 1894
- Out of service: 1 February 1896
- Fate: Sold

General characteristics
- Class & type: schooner
- Tonnage: 73-tons TM
- Length: 78 ft 0 in (23.77 m)
- Beam: 22 ft 0 in (6.71 m)
- Draft: 77 ft 0 in (23.47 m)
- Depth: 9 ft 4 in (2.84 m)
- Propulsion: Sail
- Notes: Water tank with a capacity for 16,000 agallons of water

The Joseph Pulitzer was a 19th-century Sandy Hook pilot boat, built by Moses Adams in 1894 at Essex, Massachusetts for New York Pilots. She was a replacement for the Pilot Boat Edward Cooper, that sank off Sandy Hook in 1892. The Joseph Pulitzer was one of the finest and best equipped boats in the service. She was named in honor of Joseph Pulitzer, a New York newspaper publisher. In 1896, when New York pilot boats were moving to steamboats, she was sold to the Oregon Pilots Association.

== Construction and service ==
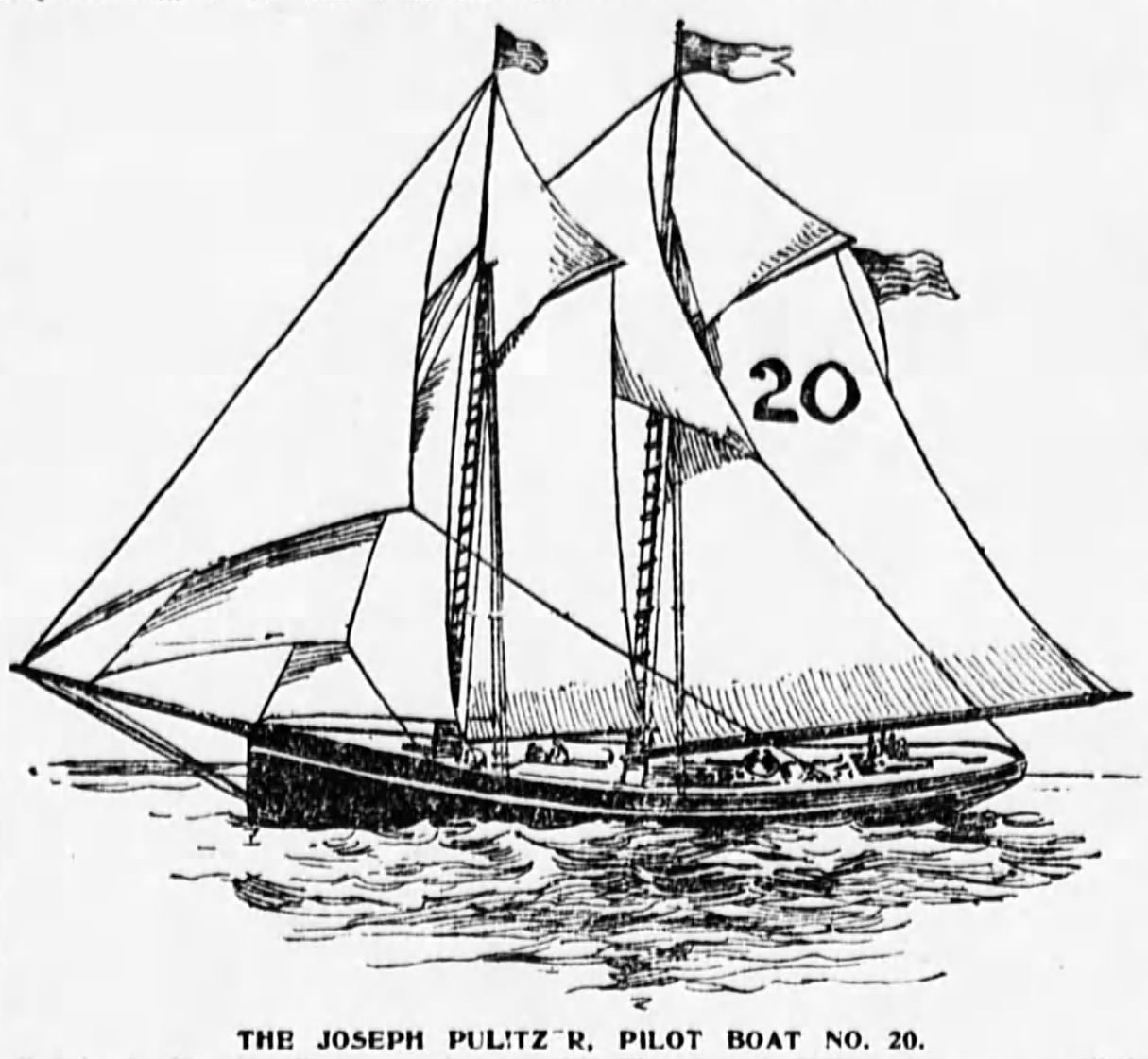
Pilot boat Joseph Pulitzer, No. 20.

The pilot schooner Joseph Pulitzer, was built by the Moses Adams shipyard in early 1894 at Essex, Massachusetts for the New York captains Jacob M. Heath, pilots John Ronayne, Thomas Marks, Frederick Ryerson, Martin Ryerson and Jacob P. Lockman. She was a replacement for the Pilot Boat Edward Cooper, No. 20, that sank off Sandy Hook in December 1892.

She was launched on 21 February 1894 and christened the Joseph Pulitzer. The boat number "20" was painted as a large number on her mainsail, that identified the boat as belonging to the Sandy Hook Pilots. The Pulitzer was one of the finest and best equipped boats in the service. Her furnishings were of hard wood and had a water tank that could carry 16,000 gallons of water. She was named in honor of Joseph Pulitzer (1847–1911), a newspaper publisher, and owner of the yacht Liberty.

The Joseph Pulitzer was registered with the Record of American and Foreign Shipping, from 1895 to 1900. Captain Jacob M. Heath was listed as Master of the boat. Her dimensions were 97 ft. in length; 22 ft. breadth of beam; 9.4 ft. depth of hold; and 73-tons Tonnage. From 1899 to 1900 her hailing port changed from New York to Astoria, Oregon, her Master was Captain H. A. Harvey, and her owner was P. C. Cordine.

In July 1897, the pilot-boat Joseph Pulitzer rescued part of the crew and passengers from the schooner Georgiana Young. The ship was stranded in an easterly storm on Roamer Shoal.

== End of service ==
On 1 February 1896, the New York Pilots discarded sixteen sailboats and moved them to the Erie Basin in Brooklyn. They were replaced with steam pilot boats. The Joseph Pulitzer was sold for $7,000.

In January 1898, Captain P. C. Cordiner sailed the Joseph Pulitzer around the Horn of Africa to Astoria, Oregon. She was purchased by the Oregon Pilots Association. Captain W. A. Harvey and a crew of six Norwegian sailors sailed her from Hoboken, New Jersey to Oregon.

In 1903, the Oregon bar pilots paid $13,000 for the Joseph Pulitzer. In March 1909, the Port of Portland purchased the pilot schooner Joseph Pulitzer from the Columbia River bar pilot Association for $12,000.

On 18 December 1920, the Joseph Pulitzer was in Alaska, as a mail carrier between Seward and the Aleutians and sank in Aniakchak Bay, Alaska. There were no casualties.

== See also ==
- List of Northeastern U. S. Pilot Boats
