= Rosalie Loew Whitney =

American lawyer and suffragist

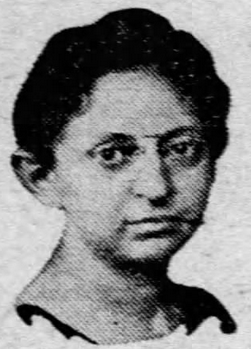
- Rosalie Loew Whitney, from a 1924 newspaper.
- Born: May 4, 1873; New York City, US
- Died: September 3, 1939 (aged 66); New York City, US
- Occupations: Lawyer, judge, government official, suffragist
- Years active: 1890s – 1930s
- Spouse: Travis Harvard Whitney
- Relatives: Leopold Löw (grandfather)

Rosalie Loew Whitney (May 4, 1873 – September 3, 1939) was an American lawyer and suffragist.

== Early life ==
Rosalie Loew was born in New York City to Hungarian Jewish immigrants William Noah Loew and Leontine (Lottie) Wechsler Lowe. Her father was a lawyer; her mother was a milliner. Her paternal grandfather, Leopold Löw, was a noted rabbi and Jewish leader in Hungary.

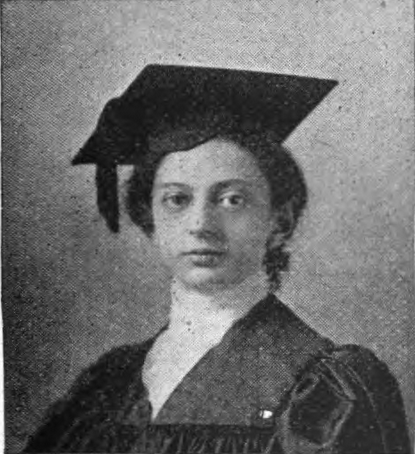
Rosalie Loew Whitney (1895)

Loew earned a bachelor's degree in 1892 at Hunter College, and a law degree in 1895 from New York University School of Law.

== Career ==
Loew was admitted to the New York Bar in 1895. In 1896, she was the first woman lawyer to try a case before the New York Supreme Court. She and her father were partners in a law firm, Loew and Loew, before she took a position with the Legal Aid Society in 1897. "It is an error to suppose that woman cannot look at things in a large way," she commented in an 1896 newspaper profile. "There is nothing in the mental bias of a woman to prevent her having a comprehensive knowledge of any of the affairs of life, no matter how great." She used her language skills (fluency in Hungarian, Yiddish, and German) to represent and interpret for immigrant workers, in cases involving labor violations, predatory loans, and fraud. In 1903, she was rejected for membership in the Bar Association of the City of New York, on the basis of her gender.

Whitney was active in the women's suffrage movement in New York City, as a member of the Brooklyn Woman's Suffrage Party and as New York congressional chair of the Woman's Federal Equality Association. She represented Brooklyn at the National Suffrage Convention in Washington in 1917; and she spoke on behalf of the National American Woman Suffrage Association in a Congressional hearing in 1918. She helped to found the National Women's Republican Club. She attended the Republican National Committee meeting in St. Louis in 1918, working for the party's public support for the 19th Amendment.

Whitney and her husband were partners in a law firm, Loew and Whitney, from 1903 to 1907. She served on the board of the Women's Municipal League. From 1919 to 1921, she sat on the New York State Industrial Commission, filling the vacancy left when Frances Perkins went to Washington. In 1930 she was elected director of the Brooklyn Neighborhood Laundry Owners Association. She was in the first group of twelve women admitted to the Bar Association of the City of New York, in 1937; by that time, she had a long career in the law, and had already served two years as justice on the Court of Domestic Relations in New York.

== Personal life ==
Rosalie Loew married fellow lawyer Travis Harvard Whitney in 1903. They had three sons, Travis, John, and William, all born in the first five years of their marriage. Travis Whitney died in 1934; Rosalie Loew Whitney died five years later, in 1939, aged 66, from leukemia. Her grave is in Green-Wood Cemetery in Brooklyn.

== See also ==
- List of first women lawyers and judges in New York
