= Hermann Oelrichs (pilot boat) =

Sandy Hook Pilot boat

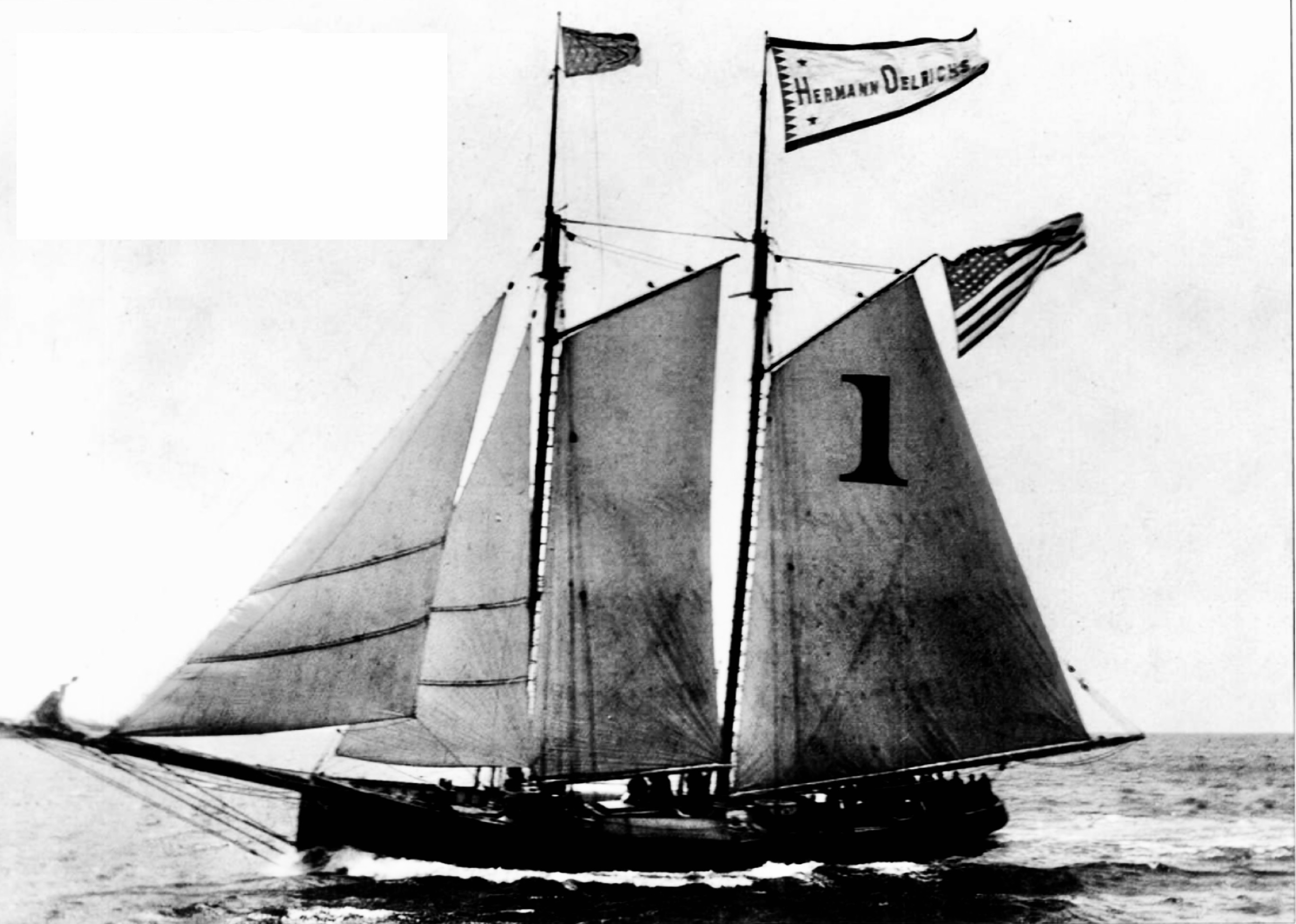
- Pilot Boat Hermann Oelrichs, No. 1.

History

United States
- Name: Hermann Oelrichs
- Namesake: Hermann Oelrichs, American shipping businessman
- Owner: N. Y. Pilots
- Operator: Pilot Speitzer; Michael Lyons
- Builder: Moses Adams shipyard at Essex, Massachusetts
- Launched: May 12, 1894
- Out of service: July 15, 1904
- Fate: Sold

General characteristics
- Class & type: Schooner
- Displacement: 73 tons
- Length: 87 ft 0 in (26.52 m)
- Beam: 22 ft 0 in (6.71 m)
- Draught: 9 ft 4 in (2.84 m)
- Propulsion: schooner sail
- Sail plan: 74 ft 0 in (22.56 m) mast length; 72 ft 0 in (21.95 m) mast length

The Hermann Oelrichs was a 19th-century Sandy Hook Pilot boat, built in 1894 by Moses Adams at Essex, Massachusetts for a group of New York Pilots. She helped transport New York City maritime pilots between inbound or outbound ships coming into the New York Harbor. The Herman Oelrichs was said to be the fastest of the New York pilot fleet. She was built to replace the pilot boat Hope, that was wrecked in 1890.

== Construction and service ==
The New York pilot-boat Hermann Oelrichs, No. 1, was built by the Moses Adams shipyard in early 1894 at Essex, Massachusetts, for a group of New York pilots, to replace the pilot boat Hope, that was wrecked in 1890 along the shore of the Sandy Hook Point. The boat number "1" was painted as a large number on her mainsail, that identified her as belonging to the Sandy Hook Pilots.

On April 21, 1894, the New York pilot boat Herman Oelrichs, was towed to Gloucester, Massachusetts for rigging. She left Gloucester on her maiden cruise, on May 12, 1894, to reach the Port of New York on May 25, 1894. She had on board four pilots. She was the fastest of the New York pilot fleet. Her dimensions were 87 ft. length on deck; her masts were 74 ft. and 72 ft. high; and 73-tons burthen. She beat the Boston pilot boat, Hesper, No. 5, on a race leaving Gloucester.

On June 4, 1894, Pilot Speitzer of the new pilot boat Herman Oelrichs, No. 1, brought in the British seamer Furnesia, and reported having seen the yacht Vigilant. On February 21, 1895, Captain Michael Lyons, of the pilot boat Herman Oelrichs, No. 1, boarded the steamship Lucania.

By June 21, 1896, In the age of steam, twenty-four pilot boats had been withdrawn from service leaving five pilot boats kept for emergency service. The five boats that were retained were the Herman Oelrichs, Ambrose Snow, Caldwell H. Colt, Edward F. Williams, and the Alexander M. Lawrence.

On June 6, 1897, pilot Nichols Roach, of the Sandy Hook pilot boat Hermann Oelrichs, No. 1, reported that a carrier pigeon flew on board with a tag attached on its leg with the message: "H. V. M., No. 3."

On June 13, 1899, the Herman Oelrichs rescued the crew of the German steamship Macedonia, which was hit and sank by the steamship Hamilton, off Sea Bright, New Jersey.

By April 7, 1901, the pilot boat Herman Oelrichs, was anchored off Stapleton, Staten Island, when five of her men were in a yawl that filled with water. One pilot, John Syceth was drowned.

== End of service ==
On July 15, 1904, the Hermann Oelrichs, was put up for sale at the Pilot Office in New York City.

On Jun 7, 1910, Herman Oelrichs, owned by Captain Fred B. Rice, and others was sold to Captain A. F. Warren, of Pensacola, Florida. She was added to the fleet of fishing schooners owned by the Warren Fishing Company in Florida.

== See also ==
- List of Northeastern U. S. Pilot Boats
