= Travis Harvard Whitney =

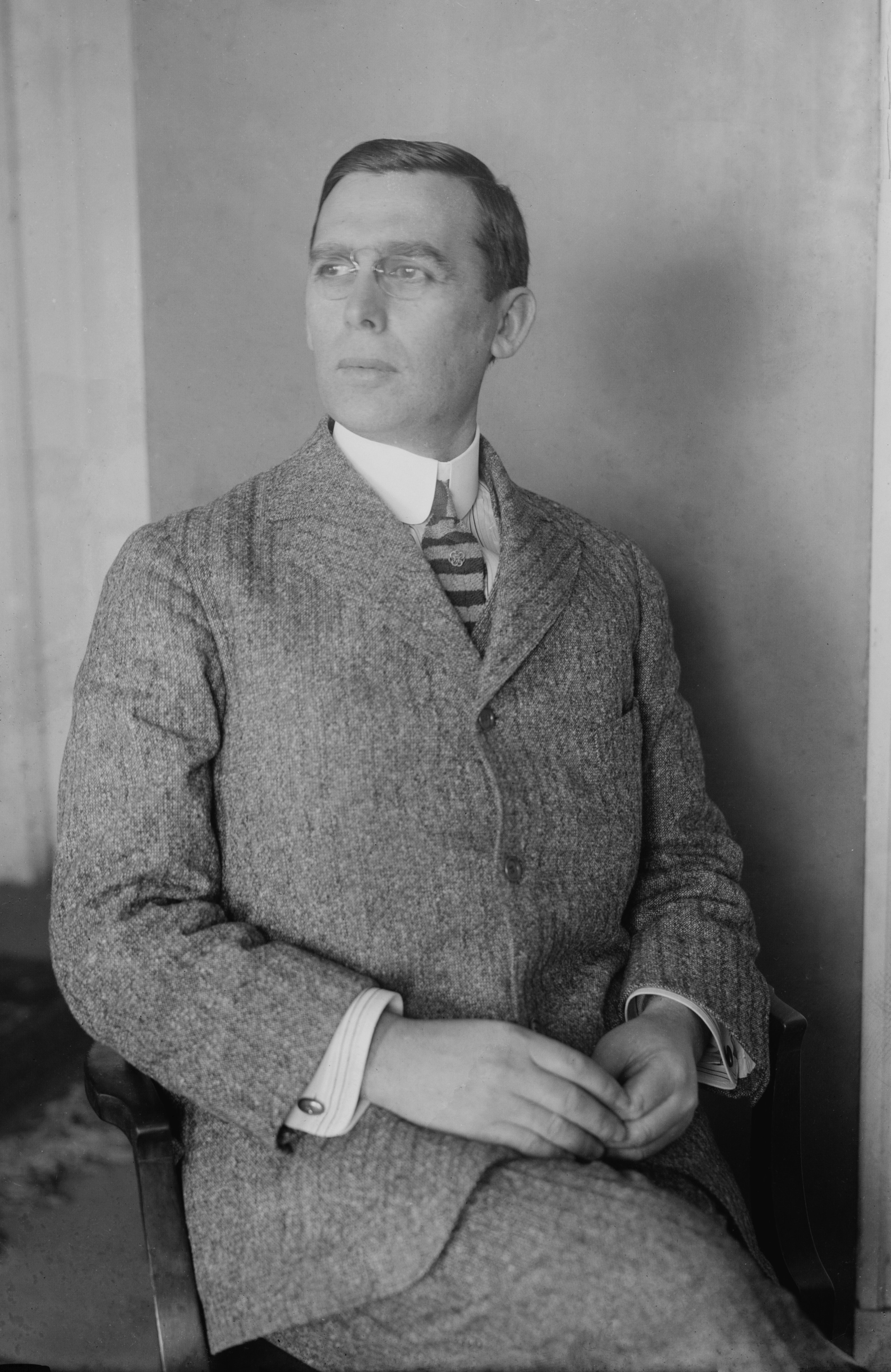

Head of the New York Public Service Commission
- In office 1916
- Governor: Charles Seymour Whitman
- Preceded by: John Sergeant Cram

Personal details
- Born: June 22, 1875 Indiana, US
- Died: January 8, 1934 (aged 58) New York City, US
- Spouse: Rosalie Loew
- Education: Harvard Law School

Travis Harvard Whitney (June 22, 1875 – January 8, 1934) was the head of the New York Public Service Commission.

== Biography ==
He was born on June 22, 1875, in Gentryville, Indiana, to Thomas J. and Mary J. Whitney (née Strauss). He attended Harvard Law School and graduated in 1903. He became the assistant secretary at the Citizens Union. In 1903 he married Rosalie Loew; he and his wife formed a law firm, Loew & Whitney.

He was secretary of the New York Public Service Commission when it was begun in 1907. In 1916 he was promoted to head the commission by governor Charles Seymour Whitman to replace the outgoing John Sergeant Cram.

He died on January 8, 1934, of pneumonia at Post-Graduate Hospital in New York City. He was buried at Green-Wood Cemetery.
