= Edward Cooper (pilot boat) =

New York Pilot boat

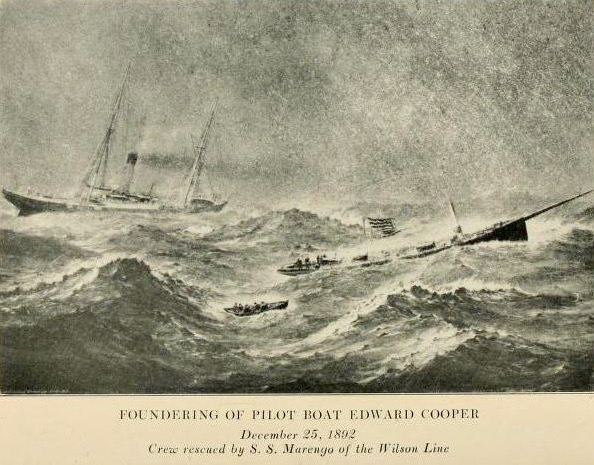
- Sinking of Pilot Boat Edward Cooper, 25 Dec 1892.

History

United States
- Name: Edward Cooper
- Namesake: Edward Cooper, mayor of New York City
- Owner: New York Pilots: Jacob Heath, J. B. Lockman, Thomas F. Murphy, J. J. Russell, George Waldie, James Rowan
- Operator: Jacob E. Lockman (1879-1880); George Waldie (1881-1883); Jacob Heath, John Taylor, James Smith (1884-1893)
- Builder: Samuel Pine shipyard
- Launched: April 8, 1879
- Christened: April 8, 1879
- Out of service: February 27, 1892
- Fate: Sank (1892)

General characteristics
- Class & type: schooner
- Tonnage: 58-tons TM
- Length: 78 ft 8 in (23.98 m)
- Beam: 21 ft 6 in (6.55 m)
- Depth: 8 ft 2 in (2.49 m)
- Propulsion: Sail

The Edward Cooper was a 19th-century Sandy Hook pilot boat, built in 1879 for New York Pilots at Greenpoint, Brooklyn. She was named in honor of the Mayor of New York City. The Edward Cooper helped transport New York City maritime pilots between inbound or outbound ships coming into the New York Harbor. She survived the Great Blizzard of 1888. In 1892, the Cooper sank in a snowstorm and was replaced by the Joseph Pulitzer in 1894.

== Construction and service ==
On April 8, 1879, the Edward Cooper, was launched from the Samuel Pine shipyard in Greenpoint, Brooklyn at the foot of Kent Street. A large number of guests attended and a photograph of the boat was taken. During the Ceremonial ship launching, Sadie W. Heath christened the boat by breaking a sacrificial bottle of champagne over the bow. The Edward Cooper, was named in honor of the Mayor of New York City (1879–1880). The boat number "20" was painted as a large number on her mainsail, that identified her as belonging to Sandy Hook pilot No. 20. Captain Jacob E. Lockman was in command.

The Edward Cooper, was registered as a Pilot Schooner with the Record of American and Foreign Shipping, from 1881 to 1893. Her ship master was George Waldie (1881–1883) and Captain Jacob Heath (1884–1893); her owners were N. Y. Pilots; built in 1879 at the Greenpoint, New York; and her hailing port was the Port of New York. Her dimensions were 78.8 ft. in length; 21.6 ft. breadth of beam; 8.2 ft. depth of hold; and 58-tons Tonnage.

In 1885, the Edward Cooper, No. 20, was on a cruise to Sable Island and came across the Thingvalla ocean liner Island off the Grand Banks of Newfoundland, that had broken her rudder. The Cooper saved her by attaching steel cables to the liner, which were used as a drag and rudder.

In the Great Blizzard of 1888, Edward Cooper, No. 20, was one was one of 17 vessels out on pilot duty at the time of the storm. She went ashore on the Long Island coast. The pilot and crew took cover at a house near the Sandy Hook Lighthouse. Mrs. W. W. Stewart fed the men and allowed them to stay the night. The men from the pilot boats Edward F. Williams, and the Centennial, joined them. John Taylor was attached to the Edward Cooper, in 1889.

On February 27, 1892, Pilot James Smith fell overboard and drowned off Barnegat Light, New Jersey, while trying to board the steamer Van Dyck from the pilot-boat Edward Cooper, No. 20.

== End of service ==
On Christmas Day, December 25, 1892, the Cooper fell victim of a snowstorm when waves crashed into the boat causing her to sink. The crew were rescued by the Wilson Line S. S. Marengo. Thomas Marks and John Hammer were pilots on the Cooper. The Edward Cooper was replaced by the Joseph Pulitzer, No. 20, on February 21, 1894, at Essex, Massachusetts for the New York Captain Jacob M. Heath.

== See also ==
- List of Northeastern U. S. Pilot Boats
