= John J. Adams =

American politician

Member of the U.S. House of Representatives from New York
- In office March 4, 1883 – March 3, 1887
- Preceded by: Anson G. McCook
- Succeeded by: Lloyd Bryce
- Constituency: 8th district (1883–85); 7th district (1885–87)

Personal details
- Born: John Joseph Adams; September 16, 1848 Douglas Town, New Brunswick colony, British North America
- Died: February 16, 1919 (aged 70) New York City, U.S.
- Resting place: Green-Wood Cemetery in Brooklyn, New York
- Citizenship: American
- Party: Democratic
- Spouse: Adelaide Virginia Whitehead (m. 1870)
- Children: 1
- Education: Columbia Law School
- Profession: Attorney

John Joseph Adams (September 16, 1848 – February 16, 1919) was an American politician and a United States Congressman from New York State, serving two terms from 1883 to 1887.

== Biography ==
Adams was born in Douglas Town in the New Brunswick colony of British North America (now part of Miramichi) on September 16, 1848. He emigrated to the United States in 1864, settling in New York City, and worked in a dry-goods firm in New York City until he began studies at Columbia Law School.

=== Early career ===
Adams graduated with an LLB degree in 1876, and was admitted to the bar later that year. In addition, he was involved in several businesses, including the Adams Mining Company of Leadville, Colorado, which included his brothers Michael Adams (1845–1899), a member of the Canadian Parliament, and Samuel Adams (1846–1928), a member of the Colorado State Senate.

=== Congress ===
Elected to the United States House of Representatives from two different districts, Adams represented the 8th District in the forty-eighth United States Congress from March 4, 1883 to March 3, 1885. He then represented the 7th district in the Fiftieth United States Congress from March 4, 1885 to March 3, 1887. Both districts at the time were in Queens County. He did not seek renomination in 1886 and returned to the practice of law.

== Death ==
In 1918, Adams suffered a stroke. He died of heart disease at The Ansonia Hotel in Manhattan on February 16, 1919. Adams was buried at Green-Wood Cemetery in Brooklyn, New York.

U.S. House of Representatives
Preceded by Anson G. McCook	Member of the U.S. House of Representatives from New York's 8th congressional district March 4, 1883 – March 3, 1885	Succeeded by Samuel S. Cox
Preceded by William Dorsheimer	Member of the U.S. House of Representatives from New York's 7th congressional district March 4, 1885 – March 3, 1887	Succeeded by Lloyd Bryce
