= USS Hope (1861) =

Yacht used as a US dispatch boat and pilot boat

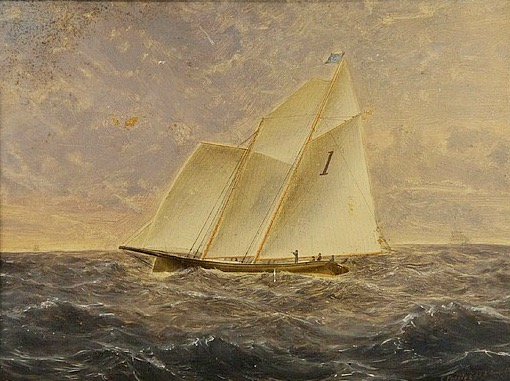
- US dispatch boat and pilot boat

History

United States
- Name: Hope
- Owner: Thomas B. Ives (1861); United States Navy (1861-1865); N. Y. Pilots (1865-1891)
- Operator: Captain Marshall, Thomas Morley (1866-1891)
- Builder: Henry Steers
- Launched: March 11, 1861
- Acquired: 29 November 1861
- Commissioned: 14 December 1861
- Decommissioned: 6 September 1865
- Fate: Wrecked on Sandy Hook Point March 13, 1891

General characteristics
- Type: Schooner
- Displacement: 134 tons
- Length: 90 ft 0 in (27.43 m)
- Beam: 21 ft 6 in (6.55 m)
- Draft: 9 ft 0 in (2.74 m)
- Depth: 9 ft 6 in (2.90 m)
- Propulsion: schooner sail
- Sail plan: 74 ft 0 in (22.56 m) length; 29 ft 0 in (8.84 m) topmasts; 14 ft 6 in (4.42 m) bowsprit; 15 ft 0 in (4.57 m) jib boom; 53 ft 0 in (16.15 m) main boom
- Speed: 10 knots (19 km/h; 12 mph)
- Complement: 25
- Armament: one 20-pounder gun
- Notes: Six berths, captain's stateroom, 400 gallon water tank, ice box.

USS Hope was a 19th-century wooden yacht schooner, designed and built in 1861 by Henry Steers for Captain Thomas B. Ives of Providence, Rhode Island. She was acquired by the Union Navy during the American Civil War. She was placed into service as a gunboat assigned to support the fleet blockading the ports of the Confederate States of America. However, at times, Hope was assigned extra tasks, such as that of a dispatch boat, supply runner and salvage ship. She was a pilot boat from 1866 to 1891 and in 1891 she was replaced by the Herman Oelrichs, when the Hope was wrecked ashore the Sandy Hook Point.

== Service history ==
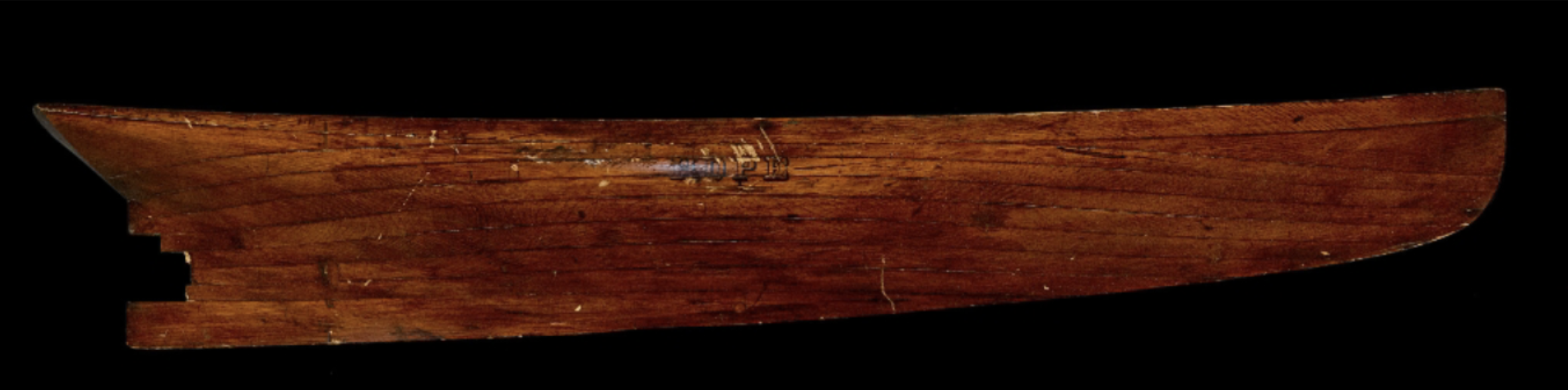
Hope half model by Henry Steers (1861).

Yacht Hope was launched from the shipyard of Henry Steers at Greenpoint, Brooklyn on March 11, 1861. She was designed and built by Henry Steers for Captain Thomas Boynton Ives, Esq, of Providence in 1861. A large crowd of witnesses were at the scene including Henry Steers and Moses H. Grinnell. She was christened "Hope," a symbol of the feeling in every pilot about their boat.

=== US Navy career ===
Hope, a wooden schooner, was purchased by the Navy 29 November 1861 from Thomas B. Ives, and commissioned at New York City 14 December 1861, Acting Master M. S. Chase in command. Hope spent the war with the South Atlantic Blockading Squadron based at Port Royal, South Carolina. She acted as a dispatch vessel supply boat for ships to the southward. In 1862 she took part in the blockade off Fernandina and the adjacent coast of Florida.

While patrolling off Charleston, South Carolina, on 27 January 1863, Hope captured the schooner Emma Tuttle, with a cargo of saltpeter for the Confederates. In June, the ship returned north for repairs at Philadelphia, Pennsylvania, and in July resumed blockade station off Charleston. Throughout most of 1864, Hope remained off Charleston as a blockader, helping to tighten the noose, which did so much to choke the rebellion. She also performed limited dispatch and supply boat duty. Hope captured sloop Racer, her second prize, off Bull's Bay 1 August 1864. Shortly afterward the ship was fitted for diving duty and in October began salvage operations in the Savannah River, raising hulks and other obstacles. After the fall of Savannah, Georgia, in December, Hope worked on the salvage of CSS Savannah, and in the spring moved to Charleston to carry out similar duties in the Charleston harbor. Hope returned north and decommissioned at New York City on 6 September 1865. She was sold 25 October 1865 to Thomas Morley.

=== Postwar civil service ===
Hope No. 1, became a New York City Pilot Boat for the New York Pilots. Her captains were Captain Marshall and Thomas Morley. The Hope was registered with the Index to Ship Registers from 1877 to 1890 to the N. Y. Pilots and Captain Thomas Morely as master. On December 19, 1866, pilot-boat Hope, No. 1, accepted a race with pilot-boat John D. Jones, No. 15, from New York across the Atlantic to Cowes for $50,000. ON January 15, 1867, the Commissioners of Pilots issued an order forbidding the entrance of any pilot-boat into a contest, which was a disappointment to the pilots.

On October 9, 1873, the Hope, was one of the boats that participated in the Ocean Regatta, for the Bennet Cup, which was a race from Owl's Head Point around to Cape May Lighthouse in New Jersey, and back to the Sandy Hook Lightship. On July 31, 1887, Captain Thomas Morley, one of the oldest Sandy Hook pilots died suddenly. He had served as a pilot on the Moses H. Grinnell and had been on board pilot boat Hope No. 1 for twenty years. Hope was thought to be lost near Sandy Hook on April 15, 1890, off Owl's Head by an unknown steamer. She was able to survive the accident and was towed into New York harbor. On March 13, 1891, Hope was wrecked ashore the Sandy Hook Point. The crew of the Hope, were all rescued by Captain Patterson and his Life-saving crew.

New York pilot-boat Herman Oelrichs, No. 1, was built in 1894 in Essex, Connecticut, for the New York pilots, to replace the Hope, wrecked in 1890. The Herman Oelrichs was the "fastest of the New York pilot fleet."
