= Peace House (New York City) =

Peace House was founded in New York City in 1923 by Edith Clare Bryce Cram.

== History ==
It was founded in New York City in 1923 by Edith Clare Bryce Cram.

The building for The Peace House was located at 1280 Fifth Avenue at 109th Street and was an example of neoclassical architecture and it was designed by Frederick Fillmore French.

From 1950 to 1958 the building was used as a television studio by the US network CBS.

The studio was numbered 57 and also called The Peace Theater. CBS used it for the original Field Sequential color broadcasts in 1951. The color shows ended in October 1951. It was used by Mike & Buff, The Egg and I, Valiant Lady, Red Brown & the Rocket Rangers and Hotel Cosmopolitan (1957–58). That appears to be the last time I find a show originating from there. Mike & Buff may have also come from another studio (there is an overlap in shows there in 1952-53)
