= Darussalam Great Mosque, Samarinda =

Mosque in Samarinda, East Kalimantan, Indonesia

Darussalam Great Mosque Masjid Raya Darussalam

Religion
- Affiliation: Islam
- Branch/tradition: Sunni
- Province: East Kalimantan

Location
- Location: Samarinda, Indonesia
- Interactive map of Darussalam Great Mosque; Masjid Raya Darussalam
- Coordinates: 0.5031966999999999°S 117.14781590000001°E

Architecture
- Type: Mosque
- Style: Ottoman
- Completed: 1925

Specifications
- Length: 25 m
- Width: 25 m
- Dome: 1
- Minaret: 4

The Darrusalam Great Mosque (Indonesian: Masjid Raya Darussalam) is the second largest mosque in the province of East Kalimantan after the Samarinda Islamic Center Mosque, and it is located in Pasar Pagi, Samarinda Kota, Samarinda, which is the center of Samarinda city. The main characteristics of the mosque is that it has a large green dome and several small domes adjacent to the dome and has four minarets. The mosque is facing Mahakam River.

== History ==
Construction of the mosque began in 1925, initiated by merchants of the Bugis and Banjar people. Since the construction, the building has not changed much.

Previously, the mosque was named Jamik Mosque, which later underwent renovations in 1953 and 1967. The mosque was originally built on a land area of 25 × 25 meters on the outskirts of the Mahakam River. With the increasingly rapid development of Samarinda, however, the mosque was replaced by a building on Yos Sudarso Street with an area of around 15 thousand square meters.

== Architecture ==
The building of the mosque resembles the mosques of Ottoman Empire. The characteristics are seen in the shape of domes, minarets, and a number of arches over doors and windows.
