= Edward Cooper (mayor) =

American politician

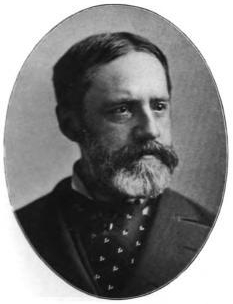

84th Mayor of New York City
- In office 1879–1880
- Preceded by: Smith Ely, Jr.
- Succeeded by: William Russell Grace

Personal details
- Born: October 26, 1824 New York City, U.S.
- Died: February 25, 1905 (aged 80) New York City, New York, U.S.
- Resting place: Green-Wood Cemetery
- Party: Democratic
- Spouse: Cornelia Redmond (m. 1854; died 1894)
- Children: Edith Cooper
- Parent(s): Peter Cooper; Sarah Raynor Bedell
- Education: Columbia University

Edward Cooper (October 26, 1824 – February 25, 1905) was an American politician who served as the 84th Mayor of New York City from 1879 to 1880 and the second president of the Cooper Union. He was the only surviving son of industrialist Peter Cooper.

== Early life ==
Cooper was born in New York City on October 26, 1824. He was the son of Peter Cooper (1791–1883) and Sarah Raynor (née Bedell) Cooper (1793–1869). His sister Amelia Cooper (1830–1912) was married to Abram Stevens Hewitt (1822–1903), who also served as mayor of New York from 1887 to 1888.

He was the grandson of John O. Cooper (1755–1838), a hatmaker who served in the Continental Army during the American Revolutionary War, and Margaret Campbell (1762–1841).

He attended the New York public schools and Columbia College, afterwards entering the iron business with the aid of his father. He completed his studies in 1842 and in 1845, Columbia awarded him the honorary degree of Master of Arts.

== Career ==
In partnership with Abram S. Hewitt, Cooper operated an iron works in Trenton, New Jersey. Edward Cooper also became a metallurgist and inventor, developing several improvements to iron making and metalworking. He declined to patent his inventions, believing that they could better serve the public if he made them widely available. After Peter Cooper's death in 1883, Edward Cooper succeeded to the presidency of the Cooper Union.

Active in politics as a Democrat, Cooper was a delegate to the 1860 Democratic National Convention in Charleston, South Carolina, and the 1876 Democratic National Convention in St. Louis. With Hewitt, Samuel J. Tilden and others, Cooper was recognized as a leader of the Swallowtails, named for the Swallowtail coat. The Swallowtails were prominent Democratic businessmen and professionals who opposed the Tammany Hall Democratic organization and attempted to introduce government reforms and end corruption. Cooper served as a member of the Committee of Seventy, which investigated and prosecuted Tammany Hall corruption. In 1875, Tilden was Governor of New York, and named Cooper to a commission which proposed anti-corruption reforms for inclusion in the New York Constitution.

By the late 1870s, Cooper was part of the Irving Hall Democrats, another organization which opposed Tammany. In 1878, Cooper ran successfully for mayor, supported by anti-Tammany Democrats, Republicans, and independents. He defeated Augustus Schell, who ran with Tammany support. During his two-year term Cooper promoted reform of the city's sanitation service and tenement laws. He was succeeded by William Russell Grace, another anti-Tammany Democrat.

In 1890, Abram S. Hewitt partnered with Edward Cooper and Hamilton M. Twombly in forming the American Sulphur Company. That company then entered into a 50/50 agreement with Herman Frasch and his partners to form the Union Sulphur Company.

=== Society life ===
In 1892, Cooper and his wife were included in Ward McAllister's "The Four Hundred", purported to be an index of New York's best families, published in The New York Times. Conveniently, 400 was the number of people that could fit into Mrs. Astor's ballroom.

== Personal life ==
In 1854, Cooper was married to Cornelia Redmond (1829–1894), the daughter of James Morton Redmond and Anne (née Bowne) Redmond. Together, they were the parents of two children, one of whom lived to maturity:

- Edith Cooper (1854–1916), who married Lloyd Stephens Bryce, a member of the U.S. House of Representatives and U.S. Minister to the Netherlands, in 1879. His sister was Clemence Smith Bryce, who married Nicholas Fish, the U.S. Ambassador to Switzerland and Belgium and was the mother of Hamilton Fish.
- Peter Cooper (b. 1860), who died young.

He died in New York City on February 25, 1905, and was buried at Green-Wood Cemetery in Brooklyn.

== See also ==
- List of mayors of New York City

Academic offices
Preceded by Peter Cooper	President of Cooper Union; 1882 — 1904	Succeeded by John Edward Parsons

Political offices
Preceded by Smith Ely, Jr.	Mayor of New York City; 1879–1880	Succeeded by William Russell Grace
