= Peter Cooper =

American politician and businessman (1791–1883)

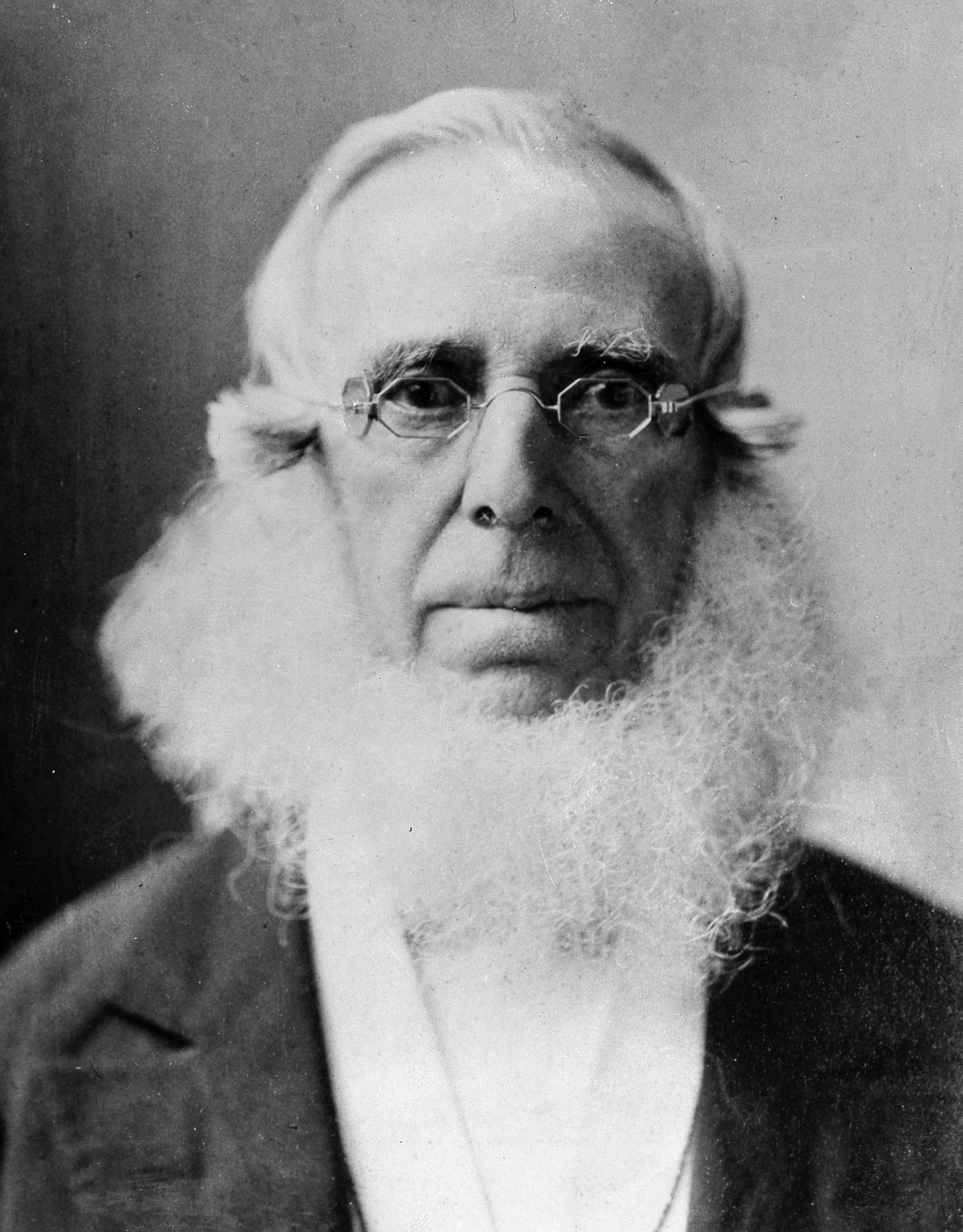
- Cooper, c. 1870s
- Born: February 12, 1791; New York City, U.S.
- Died: April 4, 1883 (aged 92); New York City, U.S.
- Burial place: Green-Wood Cemetery
- Occupations: Industrialist; inventor; philanthropist; politician
- Years active: 1828–1883
- Spouse: Sarah Raynor Bedell (m. 1813; died 1869)
- Children: 2, including Edward

Peter Cooper (February 12, 1791 – April 4, 1883) was an American industrialist, inventor, philanthropist, and politician. He designed and built the first American steam locomotive, the Tom Thumb, founded the Cooper Union for the Advancement of Science and Art, served as its first president, and stood for election as the Greenback Party's candidate in the 1876 presidential election.

Cooper began tinkering at a young age while working in various positions in New York City. He purchased a glue factory in 1821 and used that factory's profits to found the Canton Iron Works, where he earned even larger profits by fabricating machinery such as the Tom Thumb. Cooper's success as a businessman and inventor continued over the ensuing decades, and he became the first mill operator to successfully use anthracite coal to puddle iron. He also developed numerous patents for products such as gelatin and participated in the laying of the first transatlantic telegraph cable.

During the Gilded Age, Cooper became an ardent critic of the gold standard and the debt-based monetary system of bank currency, advocating instead for government-issued banknotes. Cooper was nominated for president at the 1876 Greenback National Convention, and the Greenback ticket of Cooper and Samuel Fenton Cary won just under one percent of the popular vote in the 1876 presidential election. His son Edward and his son-in-law Abram Hewitt both served as Mayor of New York City.

== Early life ==
Peter Cooper was born in New York City of Dutch, English and Huguenot descent, the fifth child of John Cooper, a Methodist hatmaker from Newburgh, New York. His family descended from Obidiah Cooper, who had settled in New York from England around 1662. Cooper lived in Peekskill from a young age until age 17, when he returned to New York City to become an apprentice. He worked as a coachmaker's apprentice, cabinet maker, hatmaker, brewer and grocer, and was throughout a tinkerer: he developed a cloth-shearing machine which he attempted to sell, as well as an endless chain he intended to be used to pull barges and boats on the newly completed Erie Canal (which was routed west to east across upper New York State from Lake Erie to the upper Hudson River) which its chief supporter, the Governor of New York, De Witt Clinton approved of, but which Cooper was unable to sell. During the War of 1812, Cooper ran a wood mill which supplied the Americans throughout the war, though this venture failed after the war's conclusion and he sold the business as a furniture shop.

In 1821, Cooper purchased a glue factory on Sunfish Pond on east side Manhattan Island for $2,000 at Kips Bay, where he had access to raw materials from the nearby slaughterhouses, and ran it as a successful business for many years, producing a profit of $10,000 (equivalent to roughly $200,000 in 21st century value today) within 2 years, developing new ways to produce glues and cements, gelatin, isinglass and other products, and becoming the city's premier provider to tanners (leather), manufacturers of paints, and dry-goods merchants. The effluent from his factory eventually polluted the pond so much that in 1839 it had to be drained and backfilled for eventual building construction.

== Business career ==
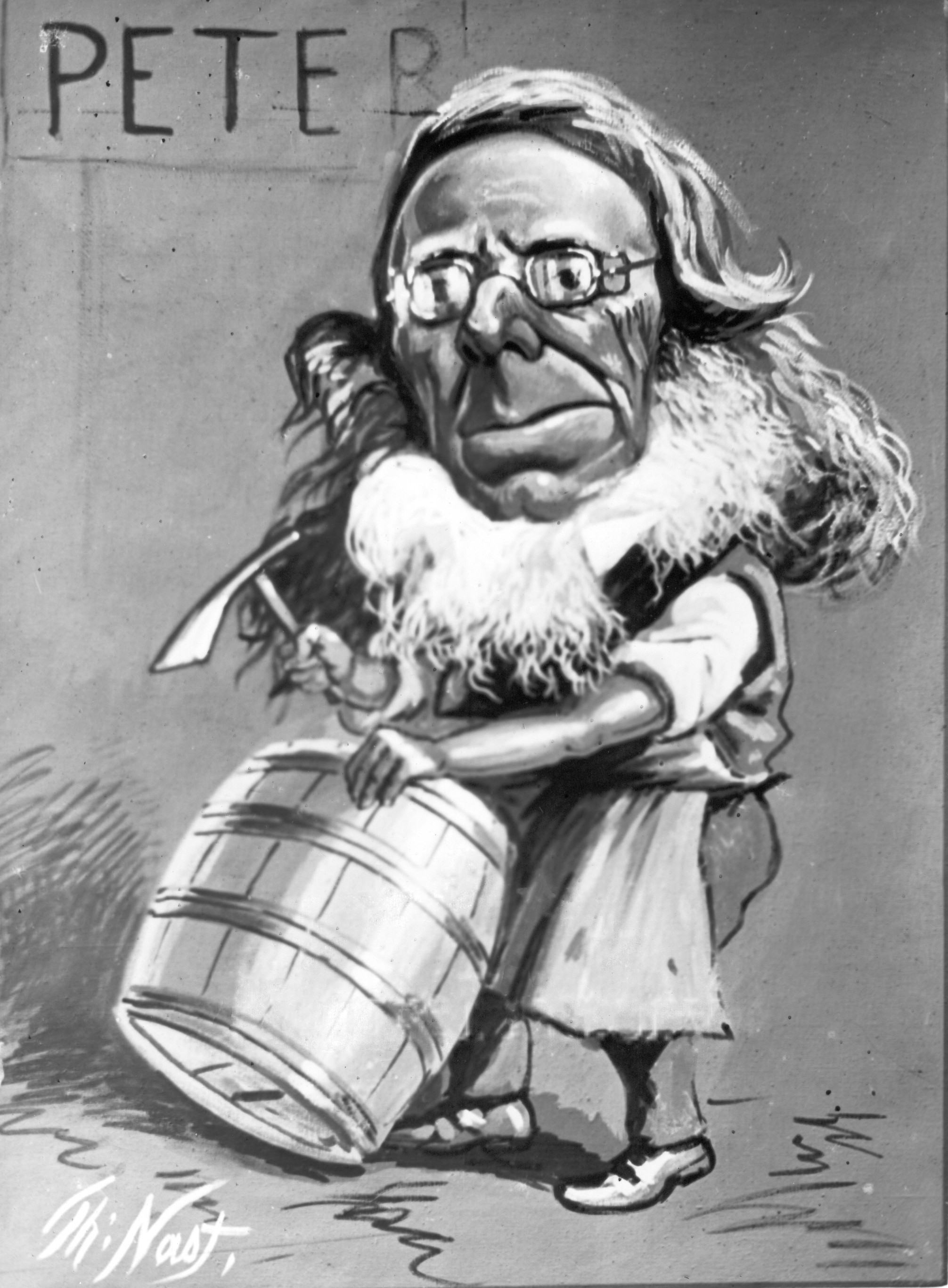
Caricature of Peter Cooper by Thomas Nast, depicting Cooper as a cooper.

Having been convinced that the proposed Baltimore and Ohio Railroad would drive up prices for land in Maryland, Cooper used his profits to buy 3,000 acres (12 km^{2}) of land there in 1828 and began to develop them, draining swampland and flattening hills, during which he discovered iron ore on his property. Seeing the Baltimore and Ohio Railroad as a natural market for iron rails to be made from his ore, he founded the Canton Iron Works in Baltimore, and when the railroad developed technical problems, he put together the Tom Thumb steam locomotive for them in 1829 from various old parts, including musket barrels, and some small-scale steam engines he had fiddled with back in New York. The engine was a rousing success, prompting investors to buy stock in B&O, which enabled the company to buy Cooper's iron rails, making him what would be his first fortune.

Cooper began operating an iron rolling mill in New York beginning in 1836, where he was the first to successfully use anthracite coal to puddle iron. Cooper later moved the mill to Trenton, New Jersey, on the Delaware River to be closer to the sources of the raw materials the works needed. His son and son-in-law, Edward Cooper and Abram S. Hewitt, later expanded the Trenton facility into a giant complex employing 2,000 people, in which iron was taken from raw material to finished product.

Cooper also operated a successful glue factory in Gowanda, New York, that produced glue for decades. A glue factory was originally started in association with the Gaensslen Tannery, there, in 1874, though the first construction of the glue factory's plant, originally owned by Richard Wilhelm and known as the Eastern Tanners Glue Company, began on May 5, 1904. Gowanda, therefore, was known as America's glue capital.

Cooper owned a number of patents for his inventions, including some for the manufacture of gelatin, and he developed standards for its production. While his patent for “Portable Gelatine” bears a remarkable resemblance to the description of the dessert, Jell-O, that product was trademarked decades after Cooper's patent expired.

Cooper later invested in real estate and insurance, and became one of the richest men in New York City. Despite this, he lived relatively simply in an age when the rich were indulging in more and more luxury. He dressed in simple, plain clothes, and limited his household to only two servants; when his wife bought an expensive and elaborate carriage, he returned it for a more sedate and cheaper one. Cooper remained in his home at Fourth Avenue and 28th Street even after the New York and Harlem Railroad established freight yards where cattle cars were parked practically outside his front door, although he did move to the more genteel Gramercy Park development in 1850.

In 1854, Cooper was one of five men who met at the house of Cyrus West Field in Gramercy Park to form the New York, Newfoundland and London Telegraph Company, and, in 1855, the American Telegraph Company, which bought up competitors and established extensive control over the expanding American network on the Atlantic Coast and in some Gulf coast states. He was among those supervising the laying of the first Transatlantic telegraph cable in 1858.

== Invention of first steel rocking chair (1830s) ==
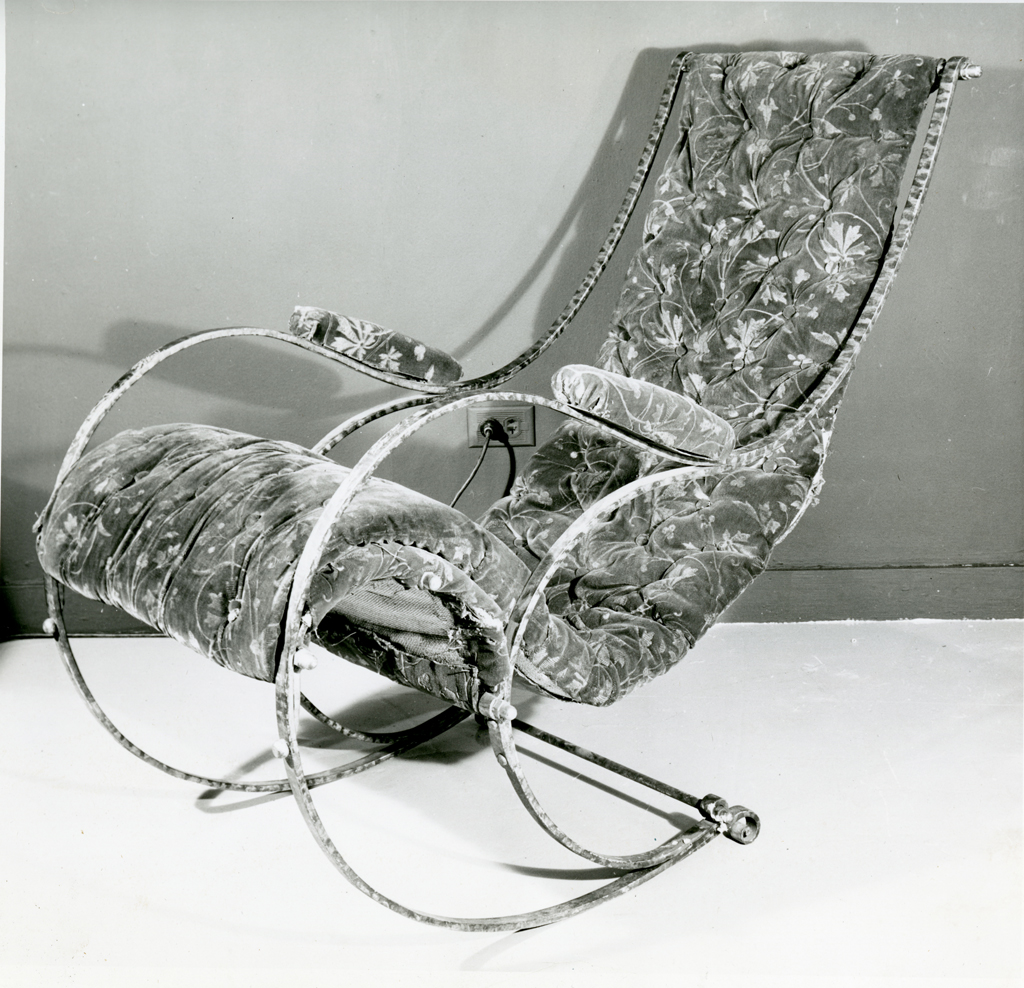
Steel rocking chair designed by Peter Cooper in the 1830s

During the 1830s Cooper designed the first steel chair in America, which was a rocking chair. Cooper produced a functional, minimalist design radically different from the Victorian heavily decorated, ostentatious style of the time. Most rocking chairs had separate rockers fixed to regular chair legs, but Cooper's chair used the curve of its frame to ensure the rocking motion. Cooper's chair was made of steel or wrought iron with upholstery slung across the frame. The model was manufactured at R.W. Winfield & Co. in Britain. The firm exhibited examples of the chair at the Great Exhibition of the Works of Industry of all Nations (Crystal Palace Exhibition) in 1851 and the Great London Exposition of 1862.

== Political views and career ==
In 1840, Cooper became an alderman of New York City.

Prior to the Civil War, Cooper was active in the anti-slavery movement and promoted the application of Christian concepts to solve social injustice. He was a strong supporter of the Union cause during the war and an advocate of the government issue of paper money.

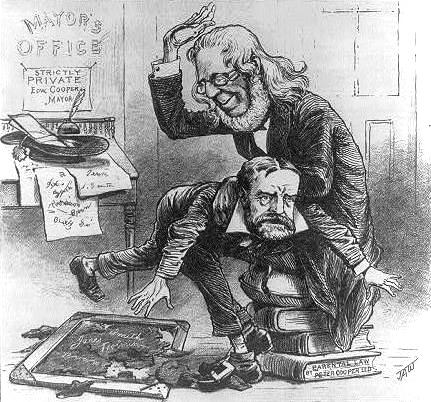
1879 Puck cartoon shows Cooper spanking his son Mayor Edward Cooper.

Influenced by the writings of Lydia Maria Child, Cooper became involved in the Indian reform movement, organizing the privately funded United States Indian Commission. This organization, whose members included William E. Dodge and Henry Ward Beecher, was dedicated to the protection and elevation of Native Americans in the United States and the elimination of warfare in the western territories.

Cooper's efforts led to the formation of the Board of Indian Commissioners, which oversaw Ulysses S. Grant's Peace Policy. Between 1870 and 1875, Cooper sponsored Indian delegations to Washington, D.C., New York City, and other Eastern cities. These delegations met with Indian rights advocates and addressed the public on United States Indian policy. Speakers included: Red Cloud, Little Raven, and Alfred B. Meacham and a delegation of Modoc and Klamath Indians.

Cooper was an ardent critic of the gold standard and the debt-based monetary system of bank currency. Throughout the depression from 1873 to 1878, he said that usury was the foremost political problem of the day. He strongly advocated a credit-based, Government-issued currency of United States Notes. In 1883 his addresses, letters and articles on public affairs were compiled into a book, Ideas for a Science of Good Government.

=== Presidential candidacy ===
Cooper was encouraged to run in the 1876 presidential election for the Greenback Party without any hope of being elected. His running mate was former U.S. Representative and prohibitionist Samuel Fenton Cary. The campaign cost more than $25,000. The election was won by Rutherford Birchard Hayes of the Republican Party. Cooper was surpassed by another unsuccessful candidate, Samuel J. Tilden of the Democratic Party.

=== A political family ===
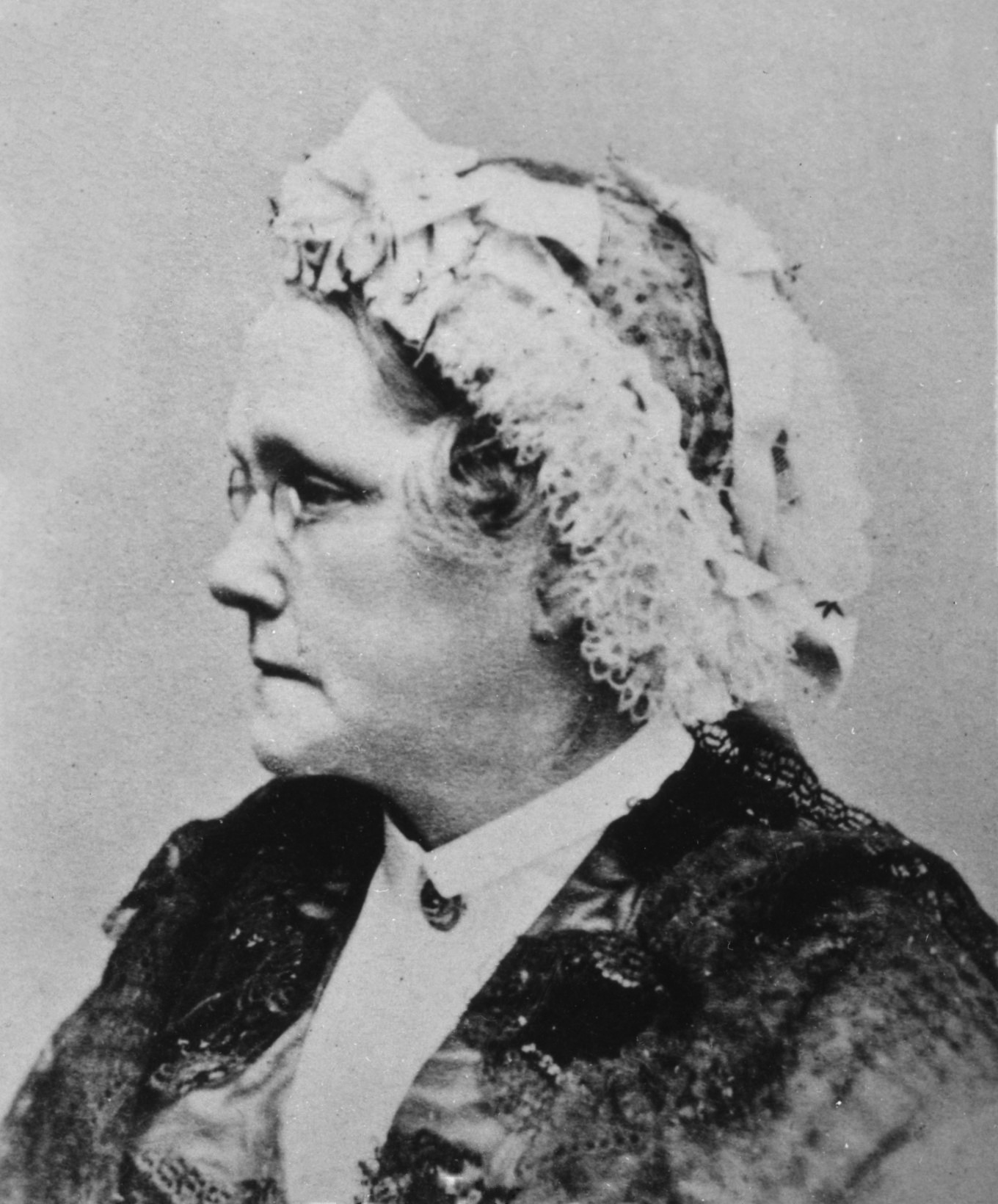
Sarah Cooper

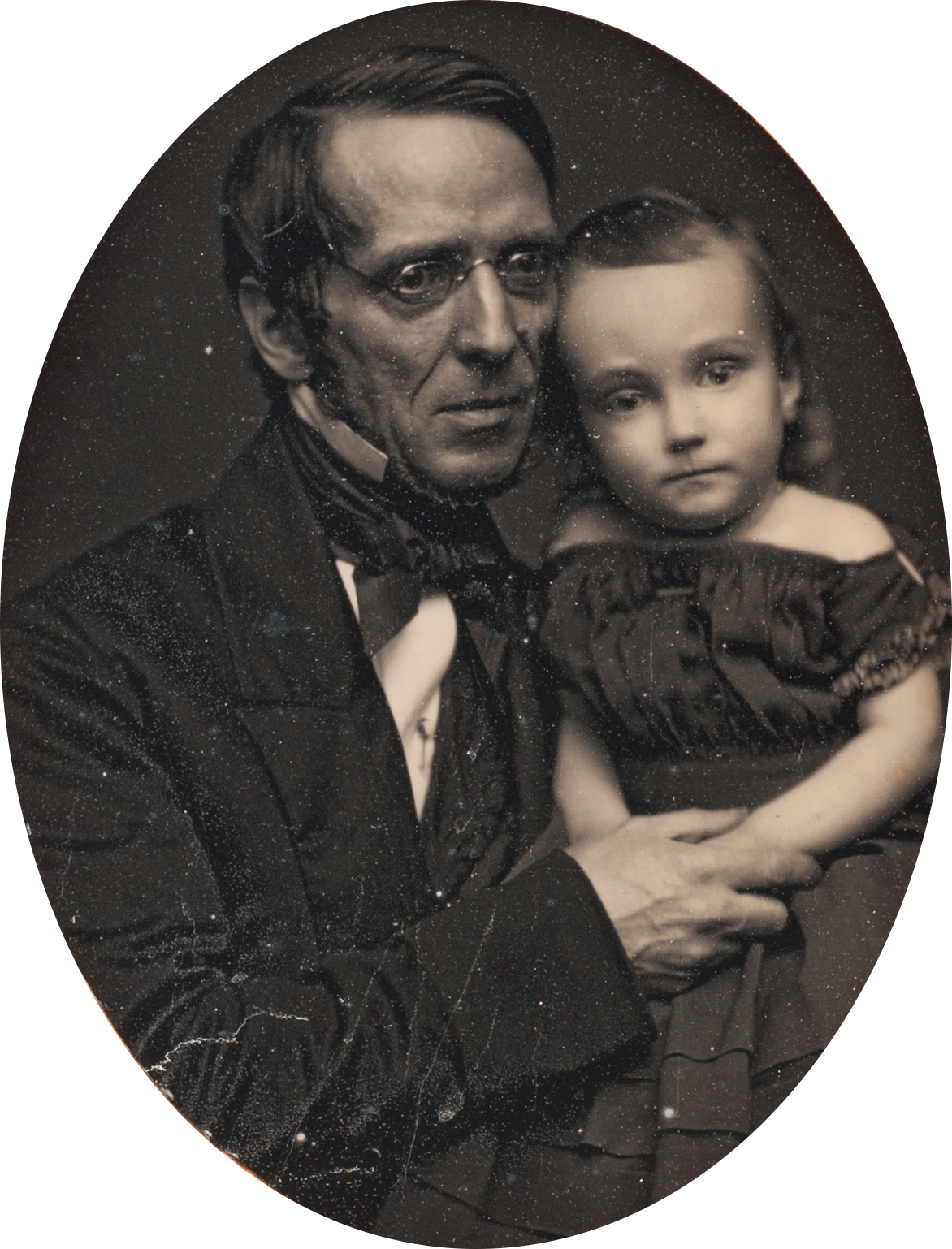
Peter Cooper posed with a young child believed to be one of his granddaughters.

On December 18, 1813, Cooper married Sarah Bedell (1793–1869), who herself was of Huguenot descent. Of their six children, only two survived past the age of four years: a son, Edward, and a daughter, Sarah Amelia. Edward served as Mayor of New York City, as would the husband of Sarah Amelia, Abram S. Hewitt, a man also heavily involved in inventions and industrialization.

Peter Cooper's granddaughters, Sarah Cooper Hewitt, Eleanor Garnier Hewitt and Amy Hewitt Green founded the Cooper-Hewitt National Design Museum, then named the Cooper-Hewitt Museum, in 1895. It was originally part of The Cooper Union, but since 1967 has been a unit of the Smithsonian Institution.

== Religious views ==
Cooper was a Unitarian who regularly attended the services of Henry Whitney Bellows at the Church of All Souls (New York), and his views were Universalistic and non-sectarian. In 1873 he wrote:

I look to see the day when the teachers of Christianity will rise above all the cramping powers and conflicting creeds and systems of human device, when they will beseech mankind by all the mercies of God to be reconciled to the government of love, the only government that can ever bring the kingdom of heaven into the hearts of mankind either here or hereafter.

== The Cooper Union ==
Cooper had for many years held an interest in adult education: he had served as head of the Public School Society, a private organization which ran New York City's free schools using city money, when it began evening classes in 1848. Cooper conceived of the idea of having a free institute in New York, similar to the École Polytechnique (Polytechnical School) in Paris, which would offer free practical education to adults in the mechanical arts and science, to help prepare young men and women of the working classes for success in business.

In 1853, he broke ground for The Cooper Union for the Advancement of Science and Art, a private college in New York, completing the building in 1859 at the cost of $600,000. The Cooper Union offered open-admission night classes available to men and women alike, and attracted 2,000 responses to its initial offering, although 600 later dropped out. The classes were non-sectarian, and women were treated equally with men, although 95% of the students were male. Cooper started a Women's School of Design, which offered daytime courses in engraving, lithography, painting on china and drawing.

The new institution soon became an important part of the community. The Great Hall was a place where the pressing civic controversies of the day could be debated, and, unusually, radical views were not excluded. In addition, the Union's library, unlike the nearby Astor, Mercantile and New York Society Libraries, was open until 10:00 at night, so that working people could make use of them after work hours.

Today The Cooper Union is recognized as one of the leading American colleges in the fields of architecture, engineering, and art. Carrying on Peter Cooper's belief that college education should be free, The Cooper Union awarded all its students with a full scholarship until fall 2014, when the college began charging tuition, in part, due to the financial impact of construction loans taken before the Great Recession. The college is currently implementing a financial plan to restore full-tuition scholarships for all its undergraduate students by 2029.

As of 2026, the admitting batch of students will have their tuition covered when they are in their 3rd (Junior) and 4th (Senior) years. Current students going into their 4th. (Senior) year also have their tuition covered by Cooper.

== Philanthropy ==
In 1851, Cooper was one of the founders of Children's Village, originally an orphanage called "New York Juvenile Asylum", one of the oldest non-profit organizations in the United States.

== Death and legacy ==
Cooper died on April 4, 1883, at the age of 92 and is buried in Green-Wood Cemetery in Brooklyn, New York. The lot number of his current burial site is 3932 & C.

Aside from Cooper Union, the Peter Cooper Village apartment complex in Manhattan; the Peter Cooper Elementary School in Ringwood, New Jersey; the Cooper School in Superior, Wisconsin, the Peter Cooper Station post office; Cooper Park in Brooklyn, Cooper Square in Manhattan, and Cooper Square in Hempstead, New York, Peter Cooper Village Senior Section 8 Housing in West Long Branch, New Jersey, are named in his honor.

== Bibliography ==
- Mack, Edward C. Peter Cooper, citizen of New York (1949) online
- "Cooper, Peter". Mechanical Engineering Biographies Throughout Time. ASME.
- Raymond, Rossiter W. (1901). Peter Cooper. New York: Houghton, Mifflin. "peter cooper raymond."
- Burrows, Edwin G. and Wallace, Mike (1999). Gotham: A History of New York City to 1898. New York: Oxford University Press. ISBN 0-195-11634-8.

Academic offices
New title	President of Cooper Union; 1859-1882	Succeeded by Edward Cooper

Party political offices
New political party	Greenback nominee for President of the United States; 1876	Succeeded by James B. Weaver
