= Commissioner of Docks and Ferries of the City of New York =

Head of New York City Department of Docks

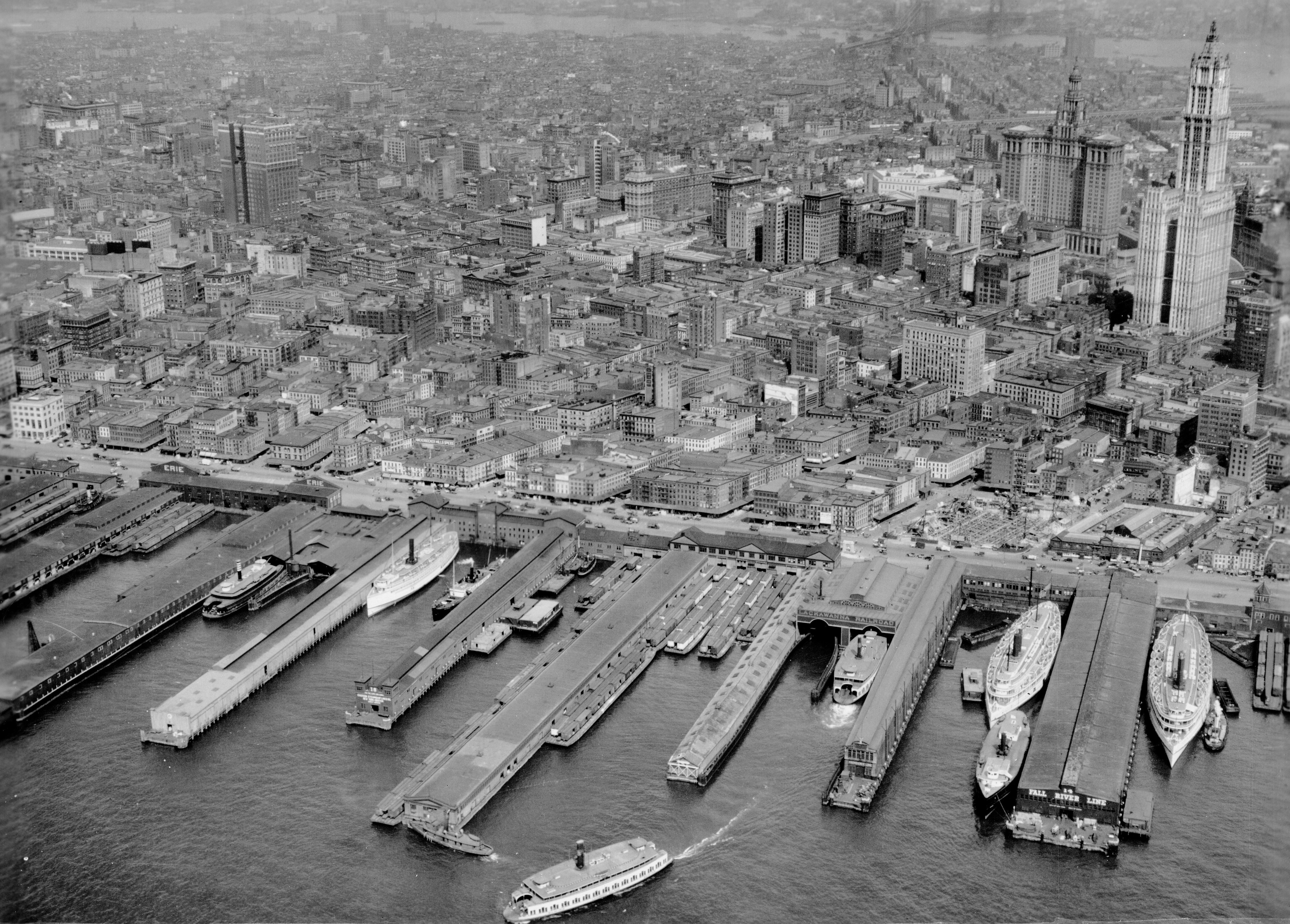
New York Harbor docks in Lower Manhattan, 1947. Many of these piers originated under the Department of Docks and Ferries.

The Commissioner of Docks of New York City was the head of the Department of Docks created by the New York State Legislature's 1870 revision of the New York City Charter, which returned numerous powers to the city government that had previously been taken by the state. This version of the city charter was known as the "Tweed Charter", after its main advocate William M. "Boss" Tweed, who controlled much of local politics via the Tammany Hall political ring. At the time the charter revision passed, he was a state senator representing the Fourth District in Manhattan.

== History ==
The Commissioner of Docks originally consisted of "a board consisting of five persons... appointed by the Mayor... who shall hold office for a term of five years." Their duties were established and defined by the commissioners of the sinking fund, which was responsible for all aspects of the city's borrowing and debt. Money for the repair and construction of wharves, piers, and slips was originally limited by the charter to $350,000, but the loose wording in this section of the charter allowed for many other expenses that quickly opened the commission to accusations of corruption, as was the case with numerous other city agencies that were controlled by Tammany Hall. In 1873, the state legislature passed a charter revision, making the dock board a three-member commission.

Accusations of poor oversight of the docks and piers, and of the department's finances, were made from time to time, but in 1889, a scandal erupted. Two of the Dock Commissioners were charged by Mayor Hugh J. Grant with three counts of corruption – "neglect and malfeasance in office", "failure to observe and enforce provisions of law...", and "failure to acquaint themselves with the duties and necessities of the Department of Docks ..." The accused commissioners countered that they had acted no differently than previous commissioners had done for decades, and that the mayor, who was a Tammany Hall crony, did not charge the third dock commissioner because he was also a Tammany Hall colleague. They were not removed from their jobs, and accusations others not collecting rents from leases of piers continued over the years.

The department was renamed the Department of Docks and Ferries in the city charter revision of 1897. The head of the department was made a one-person commissioner, with a deputy, by the city charter revision of 1901. The department was renamed the Department of Marine and Aviation effective January 1, 1942.

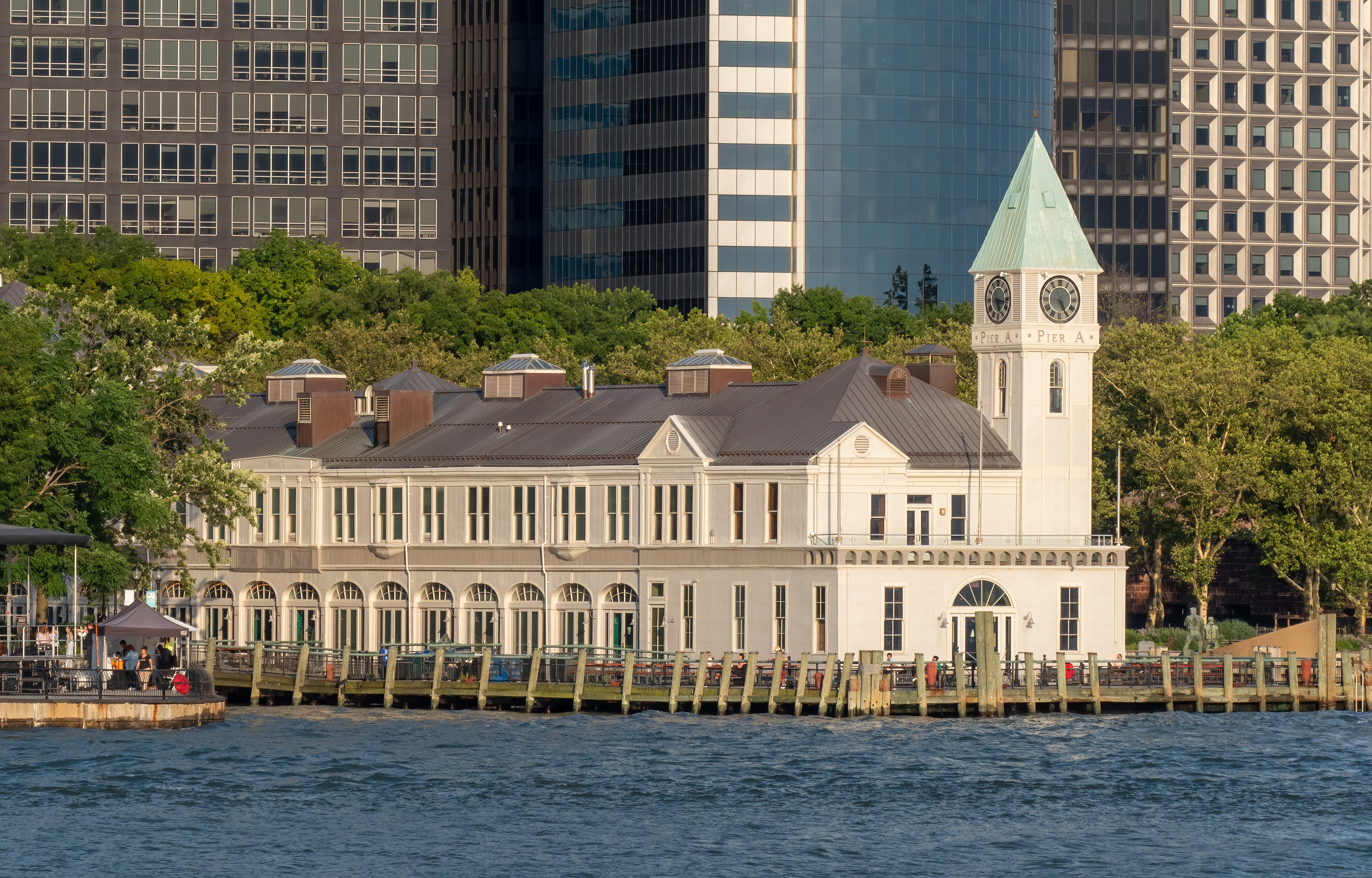
City Pier A in Lower Manhattan, built in 1884–1886 as headquarters of the Commissioner of Docks and Ferries.

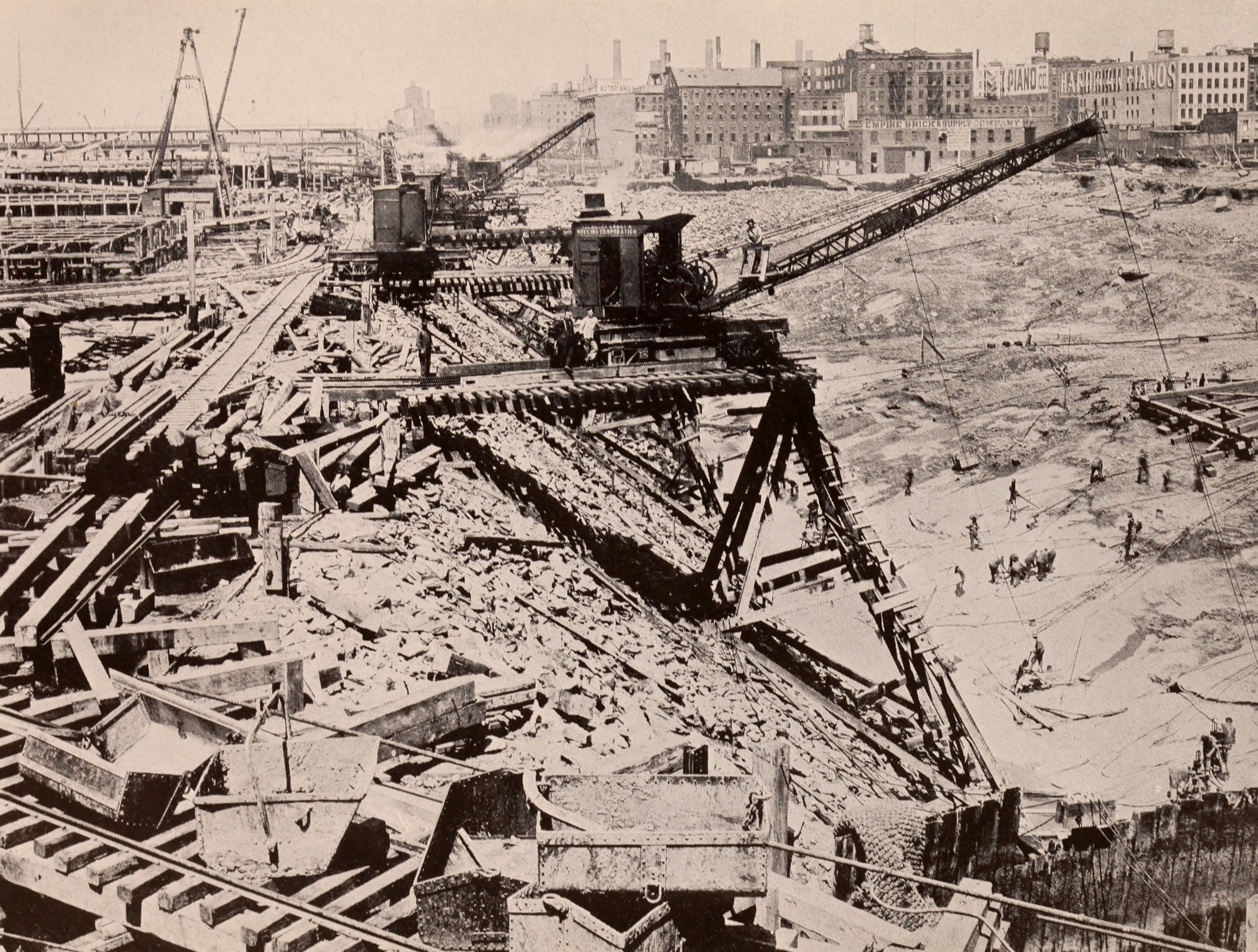
Looking North: West 46th Street Pier in Manhattan on the Hudson (aka the North River) – showing construction in the cofferdam phase (pre-unwatering), building foundations and excavating the slips at the shore ends (Note: In New York City pier construction, "shore ends" generally refers to the landward end of a pier, where it connects with the bulkhead, upland, or street grade.) of the 46th Street Piers (July 9, 1915). Those piers were demolished in 2006 to make way for a new pier, Pier 86, which hosts the Intrepid Museum.

== Commissioners ==
Commissioners	Dates in office	Mayor	Notes
Five-member commission appointed by the mayor
John T. Agnew (President); Hugh Smith (Treasurer); Wilson G. Hunt; William Wood; Richard M. Henry	April 11, 1870 – September 1, 1870	A. Oakey Hall	
John T. Agnew (President); Henry A. Smith (Treasurer); Wilson G. Hunt; William Wood; Richard M. Henry	September 1, 1870 – January 3, 1872	A. Oakey Hall	
John T. Agnew (President); John Grenville Kane (Treasurer); Wilson G. Hunt; William Wood; Richard M. Henry	January 3, 1872 – May 21, 1873	A. Oakey Hall; William F. Havemeyer	
Three-member commission appointed by the mayor
Jacob A. Westervelt (President); William Budd (Treasurer) (Note: Capt. William Budd (1828–1907) was the nominee of John Jay Cisco (1806–1884), Edward Thurlow Weed (1797–1882), James M. Brown, and others. He was for some years an officer in the United States Coast Survey, and subsequently commanded a United States vessel in the blockading service during the late war. The word "contraband," in reference to escaped slaves, was first used by William Budd, acting commander of the USS Resolute — a gunboat of the Union Navy — in a report dated August 10, 1861.); William Gardner	May 22, 1873 – December 4, 1874	William F. Havemeyer; Samuel B. H. Vance	
Jacob A. Westervelt (President); William Budd (Treasurer); Vacant	December 4, 1874 – December 11, 1874	Samuel B. H. Vance	
Jacob A. Westervelt (President); William Budd (Treasurer); Salem Howe Wales	December 11, 1874 – early 1875	William H. Wickham	
Salem Howe Wales (President); William Budd (Treasurer); Jacob A. Westervelt	early 1875 – March 1877	William H. Wickham; Smith Ely Jr.	
Jacob A. Westervelt (President); Jacob Vanderpoel (Treasurer); Henry F. Dimock	July 11, 1877 – February 21, 1879	Smith Ely Jr. Edward Cooper	
Henry F. Dimock (President); Jacob Vanderpoel (Treasurer); Vacant	February 21, 1879 – December 10, 1880	Edward Cooper	
Henry F. Dimock (President); Jacob Vanderpoel (Treasurer); William Laimbeer Jr.	December 10, 1880 – September 13, 1881	Edward Cooper; William R. Grace (1st term)	
John R. Voorhis (President); Jacob Vanderpoel (Treasurer); William Laimbeer Jr.	September 13, 1881 – May 3, 1882	William R. Grace	
William Laimbeer Jr. (President); Jacob Vanderpoel (Treasurer); John R. Voorhis	May 3, 1882 – February 14, 1883	William R. Grace; Franklin Edson	
William Laimbeer Jr. (President); John R. Voorhis (Temporary Treasurer); Vacant	February 14, 1883 – May 9, 1883	Franklin Edson	
Lucius J.N. Stark (President); John R. Voorhis (Treasurer); William Laimbeer Jr.	May 9, 1883 – May 9, 1885	Franklin Edson	
Joseph Koch (President); James Matthews (Treasurer); Lucius J.N. Stark	May 9, 1885 – late 1886 or early 1887	William R. Grace (2nd term)	
Lucius J.N. Stark (President); James Matthews (Treasurer); Joseph Koch	late 1886 or early 1887	Abram Hewitt	
Lucius J.N. Stark (President); James Matthews (Treasurer); Charles H. Marshall	May 9, 1887 – May 22, 1888	Abram Hewitt	
Lucius J.N. Stark (President); James Matthews (Treasurer); Edwin A. Post	May 22, 1888 – November 9, 1888	Abram Hewitt	
Edwin A. Post (President); James Matthews (Treasurer); Vacant	November 9, 1888 – December 21, 1888	Abram Hewitt	
Edwin A. Post (President); James Matthews (Treasurer); Charles A. Silliman	December 21, 1888 – May 22, 1889	Abram Hewitt; Hugh J. Grant	
Edwin A. Post (President); James Matthews (Treasurer); J. Sergeant Cram	May 22, 1889 – May 29, 1891	Hugh J. Grant	
Edwin A. Post (President); James J. Phelan (Treasurer); J. Sergeant Cram	May 29, 1891 – May 1, 1893	Hugh J. Grant	
J. Sergeant Cram (President); James J. Phelan (Treasurer); Andrew J. White	May 1, 1893 – March 21, 1895	Thomas F. Gilroy; William L. Strong	
J. Sergeant Cram (President); James J. Phelan (Treasurer); Edward C. O'Brien	March 21, 1895 – March 23, 1895	William L. Strong	
Edward C. O'Brien (President); James J. Phelan (Treasurer); Edwin Einstein	March 23, 1895 - May 6, 1895	William L. Strong	
Edward C. O'Brien (President); Edwin Einstein (Treasurer); John Monks	May 6, 1895 – December 31, 1897	William L. Strong	
New York, Brooklyn, Queens, The Bronx, and Staten Island consolidated as the City of New York (January 1, 1898)
J. Sergeant Cram (President); Charles F. Murphy (Treasurer); Peter F. Meyer	January 1, 1898 – January 1, 1902	Robert Van Wyck	
Single commissioner appointed by the mayor
McDougall Hawkes	January 1, 1902 – January 1, 1903	Seth Low	
Maurice Featherson	January 1, 1904 – January 1, 1904	George Brinton McClellan, Jr.	
John A. Bensel	January 1, 1904 – January 30, 1908	George Brinton McClellan, Jr.	
Vacant	January 30, 1908 – February 10, 1908		
Allan Newhall Spooner	February 10, 1908 – July 1, 1909	George Brinton McClellan, Jr.	
Calvin Tomkins	January 2, 1910 – April 2, 1913	George Brinton McClellan, Jr., William Jay Gaynor	
Robert A.C. Smith	April 2, 1913 – December 31, 1917	William Jay Gaynor; John Purroy Mitchel	
Murray Hulbert	January 1, 1918 – December 31, 1921	John F. Hylan	
John H. Delaney	January 1, 1922 – June 30, 1924	John F. Hylan	
Michael J. Cosgrove (1864–1931)	July 1, 1924 – April 30, 1931	John F. Hylan; Jimmy Walker	Hylan died in office
Vacant	April 30, 1931 – May 25, 1931	Jimmy Walker	
John McKenzie	May 25, 1931 – December 31, 1941	Jimmy Walker, Joseph V. McKee, John P. O'Brien, Fiorello H. La Guardia	
McKenzie became Commissioner of the Department of Marine and Aviation – newly established January 1, 1942 (or a re-naming of the Department of Docks and Ferries) to reflect expanded responsibilities, including aviation facilities such as the Marine Air Terminal at LaGuardia Airport.

== See also ==
- New York Harbor
- Port of New York and New Jersey
- Waterfront Commission of New York Harbor
- Murphy v. Waterfront Commission
- New York v. New Jersey (2023)
Manhattan
- Asser Levy Recreation Center
- Pier 40
Brooklyn
- Brooklyn Navy Yard
- Barron Island Airport
- Bergen Beach, Brooklyn
- Canarsie Pier
- Floyd Bennett Field
- Mill Basin, Brooklyn
- Murphy Brothers Playground
- North River
- Ruffle Bar
- Site Plan of Waterfront Improvements, Terminals & Railroad Installations at South Brooklyn, Gowanus Bay, and Erie Basin (February 1911).
- Engineer's Drawing of Bulkhead Variations designed by George Sears Greene, Jr's. (1837–1922).
Staten Island
- Staten Island Ferry Whitehall Terminal
- Staten Island Ferry
People
- Robert Baker (1862–1943)
- George Brinton McClellan (1826–1885), father of New York City's future Mayor, was appointed Chief Engineer of the Department of Docks in 1870.
- Eugene de Salignac (1861–1943), photographer who, among other things, took pictures for the Department of Docks.
- Joel Slonim (1884–1944)
- William Osborn Stoddard (1835–1925)
- John Dash Van Buren, Jr. (1838–1918), Assistant Engineer under General George B. McClellan.

== Bibliography ==
=== Secondary references ===
- Laws of the State of New-York, Passed at the Ninety-Third Session of the Legislature, Begun January Fourth, and Ended April Twenty-Sixth, 1870, in the City of Albany. Chapter 137, Article Fourteen, § 99. 93rd Session. Vol. 1. Albany, New York: Weed, Parsons and Company. 1870. p. 390 – via HathiTrust (NYPL). OCLC 1003587140 (all editions).
- Laws of the State Affecting Interests in the City and County of New-York Passed by the Legislature of 1873, Chapter 335, Article XV, § 88. 96th Session. New York, New York: Martin B. Brown. 1873. p. 115 – via HathiTrust (University of Chicago). OCLC 952976720 (all editions).
- Laws of the State of New-York, Passed at the One Hundred Twentieth Session of the Legislature, Begun January First, and Ended April Twenty-Fourth, 1897, in the City of Albany. Chapter XVI, Title 1, § 816. 120th Session. Vol. 3. New York and Albany, N.Y.: Banks and Brothers. 1897. p. 290 – via HathiTrust (NYPL).
- Newsday; Lazo, [Manuel] Alejandro ("Alex") (July 7, 2006). "Intrepid Museum to Set Sail for $55M Facelift". Vol. 66, no. 307 (City ed.). p. 14 (section A). ISSN 2574-5298; ProQuest 280043780 (ProQuest Central database).
1. Via Newspapers.com.
- New York Herald (May 17, 1873). "A 'Chartered' Circus" ... "The Fire Commissioners Confirmed—Dock and Courthouse Commissioners Nominated—Sketches of the Candidates". Vol. 38, no. 137, whole no. 13418. p. 3 (columns 4–5).
1. Via Fultonhistory.com (PDF).
- New York State Senate (1870). Documents of the Senate of the State of New-York. Ninety-Third Session – 1870. Vol. 1, Nos. 1–21 inclusive. Albany, New York: The Argus Company. p. 1 – via HathiTrust (University of Chicago). LCCN 54-45850; OCLC 1695914 (all editions).
- New York Times (The). LCCN sn78-4456, LCCN sn00-61556; ISSN 0362-4331, ISSN 1553-8095 (online); OCLC 1645522 (all editions).
1. Hall, Abraham Oakley (1826–1898) (April 11, 1870) [Dateline: April 10, 1870]. "The City Government — Heads of Departments Appointed by the Mayor – Names of the Incumbents – An Explanation from the Mayor to His Constituents – Why Some Republicans Are on the List — The Power All in the Hands of the Democrats". Vol. 19, whole no. 5788. p. 8 (columns 1–2). Retrieved November 23, 2018.
  1. NYTimes Archives → Blog.
  2. TimesMachine ` Pdf (PDF); Permalink.
  3. Via Internet Archive (SIM Box ID: IA1661925, canister no. 03). IA Collection: SIM Microfilm; Periodicals; Pub: New York Times. (Poor Image Quality).
2. "Our City Wharves — Observation Trip of the Commissioners of Docks – The Condition of the Piers". Vol. 19, whole no. 5833. June 2, 1870. p. 2 (column 3). Retrieved November 23, 2018.
  1. NYTimes Archives → Blog.
  2. TimesMachine → Pdf (PDF); Permalink.
  3. Via Internet Archive (SIM Box ID: IA1661925, canister no. 03). IA Collection: SIM Microfilm; Periodicals; Pub: New York Times. (Poor Image Quality).
3. Hall, Abraham Oakley (1826–1898) (September 3, 1870). "Department of Docks – Resignation of Commissioner Smith – Henry A. Smith, His Successor". Vol. 19, whole no. 5013. p. 8 (column 3, bottom). Retrieved November 23, 2018.
  1. NYTimes Archives → Blog.
  2. TimesMachine → Pdf (PDF); Permalink.
  3. Via Internet Archive (SIM Box ID: IA41661210, canister no. 28). IA Collection: SIM Microfilm; Periodicals; Pub: New York Times.
4. "Action at Last – An Injunction Against the Ring Officials Granted – The Complaint of the Tax-payers Presented to the Supreme Court – Argument of Ex-Judge Barrett Before Judge Barnard – A General Expression of Approval by Honest Citizens – The Executive Committee Settling Down to the Work in Hand". Vol. 20, whole no. 6230. September 8, 1871. pp. 1 & 8 (column 1, top). Retrieved November 25, 2018.
  1. NYTimes Archives → Blog.
  2. TimesMachine → Pdf (PDF); Permalink.
  3. Via Internet Archive (SIM Box ID: IA1661925, canister no. 04). IA Collection: SIM Microfilm; Periodicals; Pub: New York Times. (Poor Image Quality).
5. "The Department of Docks". Vol. 21, whole no. 6306. December 6, 1871. p. 4 (column 4, near top). Retrieved November 25, 2018.
  1. NYTimes Archives → Blog.
  2. TimesMachine → Pdf (PDF); Permalink.
  3. Via Internet Archive (SIM Box ID: IA41661210, canister no. 35). IA Collection: SIM Microfilm; Periodicals; Pub: New York Times.
6. "A New Commissioner of Docks". Vol. 21, whole no. 6331. January 4, 1872. p. 8 (column 3, middle). Retrieved November 25, 2018.
  1. NYTimes Archives → Blog.
  2. TimesMachine → Pdf (PDF); Permalink.
  3. Via Internet Archive (SIM Box ID: IA1661925, canister no. 04). IA Collection: SIM Microfilm; Periodicals; Pub: New York Times. (Poor Image Quality).
7. "Department of Docks – The New Board". Vol. 22, whole no. 6763. May 22, 1873. p. 2 (column 1, near top). Retrieved November 23, 2018.
  1. NYTimes Archives → Blog.
  2. TimesMachine → Pdf (PDF); Permalink.
  3. Via Internet Archive (SIM Box ID: , canister no.). IA Collection: SIM Microfilm; Periodicals; Pub: New York Times.
8. "Death of Dock Commissioner Gardner". Vol. 24, whole no. 7245. December 5, 1874. p. 1 (column 2, bottom). Retrieved November 25, 2018.
  1. NYTimes Archives → Blog.
  2. TimesMachine → Pdf (PDF); Permalink.
  3. Via Internet Archive (SIM Box ID: IA41661210, canister no. 53). IA Collection: SIM Microfilm; Periodicals; Pub: New York Times.
9. "Mr. Salem H. Wales Appointed Dock Commissioner". Vol. 24, whole no. 7251. December 12, 1874. p. 3 (column 3, bottom). Retrieved November 25, 2018.
  1. NYTimes Archives → Blog.
  2. TimesMachine → Pdf (PDF); Permalink.
  3. Via Internet Archive (SIM Box ID: IA41661210, canister no. 53). IA Collection: SIM Microfilm; Periodicals; Pub: New York Times.
10. "The Dock Commissioners – Needless Expenditures Cut Off – Mr. Westervelt Elected President – Inharmony in the Board – The New Commissioner, Mr. Vanderpoel, Determined to Reform the Department – What He Has Already Done, and What His Brother Commissioners Think of It – Railroad Tracks on Piers". Vol. 26, whole no. 8059. July 12, 1877. p. 8 (columns 3–4, top). Retrieved November 25, 2018.
  1. NYTimes Archives → Blog.
  2. TimesMachine → Pdf (PDF); Permalink.
  3. Via Internet Archive (IA Search Query: urn:oclc:60637631). IA Collection → Microfilm.
11. "Death of an Ex-Mayor – Career of Jacob A. Westervelt – A Sketch of His Life – His Early Training – The Ships he Built for the Merchant and Government Service". Vol. 28, whole no. 8565. February 22, 1879. p. 2 (column 2, top). Retrieved November 23, 2018.
  1. NYTimes Archives → Blog.
  2. TimesMachine → Pdf (PDF); Permalink.
  3. Via Internet Archive (SIM Box ID: IA1661925, canister no. 05). IA Collection: SIM Microfilm; Periodicals; Pub: New York Times.
12. "Kelly Finally Ousted – Allan Campbell Chosen in His Stead – A Great Defeat For Tammany – Five Anti-Kelly Democrats and Six Republicans Put in Office – A Gain of Five for the Latter – The Votes". Vol. 30, whole no. 9129. December 11, 1880. p. 1 (column 1, top). Retrieved November 25, 2018.
  1. NYTimes Archives → Blog.
  2. TimesMachine → Pdf (PDF); Permalink.
  3. Via Internet Archive (SIM Box ID: IA1661925, canister no. 05). IA Collection: SIM Microfilm; Periodicals; Pub: New York Times.
13. "How the Work Was Done – The Debate and The Voting in The Board of Aldermen". Vol. 30, whole no. 9129. December 11, 1880. p. 1 (columns 1–4, bottom). Retrieved November 25, 2018.
  1. NYTimes Archives → Blog.
  2. TimesMachine → Pdf (PDF); Permalink.
  3. Via Internet Archive (SIM Box ID: IA1661925, canister no. 05). IA Collection: SIM Microfilm; Periodicals; Pub: New York Times.
14. "Sketches of the Nominees". Vol. 30, whole no. 9129. December 11, 1880. pp. 1–2 (columns 6–7, bottom). Retrieved November 25, 2018.
  1. NYTimes Archives → Blog.
  2. TimesMachine → Pdf (PDF); Permalink.
  3. Via Internet Archive (SIM Box ID: IA1661925, canister no. 05). IA Collection: SIM Microfilm; Periodicals; Pub: New York Times.
15. "Mr. Dimock Makes Reply — A Justification of His Conduct as Dock Commissioner — His Letter to Mayor Grace Declining Reappointment – An Explanation of the Assertions of the Assembly Subcommittee". Vol. 30, whole no. 9255. May 8, 1881. p. 12 (column 1, top). Retrieved November 25, 2018.
  1. NYTimes Archives → Blog.
  2. TimesMachine → Pdf (PDF); Permalink.
  3. Via Internet Archive (SIM Box ID: IA1661901, canister no. 03). IA Collection: SIM Microfilm; Periodicals; Pub: New York Times.
16. "Five of Them Confirmed The Democratic Aldermen Dividing the Spoils – Three Anti-Tammany and Two Tammany Nominees Made Happy – George Caulfield, James Matthews, J. Nelson Tappan, John R. Voorhis, and Henry D. Purroy The Successful Men". Vol. 30, whole no. 9366. September 14, 1881. p. 8 (column 3, top). Retrieved November 25, 2018.
  1. NYTimes Archives → Blog.
  2. TimesMachine → Pdf (PDF); Permalink.
  3. Via Internet Archive (SIM Box ID: IA1661901, canister no. 03). IA Collection: SIM Microfilm; Periodicals; Pub: New York Times.
17. "The Dock Commissioners – Plain Talk About Speculation in Pier Leases". Vol. 31, whole no. 9409. November 3, 1881. p. 3 (column 1, bottom). Retrieved November 25, 2018.
  1. NYTimes Archives → Blog.
  2. TimesMachine → Pdf (PDF); Permalink.
  3. Via Internet Archive (SIM Box ID: IA1661901, canister no. 03). IA Collection: SIM Microfilm; Periodicals; Pub: New York Times.
18. "Dock Department Affairs – Mr. Voorhis's Method of Doing Business Not Approved". Vol. 31, whole no. 9571. May 11, 1882. p. 8 (column 3, near top). Retrieved November 26, 2018.
  1. NYTimes Archives → Blog.
  2. TimesMachine → Pdf (PDF); Permalink.
  3. Via Internet Archive (SIM Box ID: IA1661901, canister no. 03). IA Collection: SIM Microfilm; Periodicals; Pub: New York Times.
19. "Events in the Metropolis – Treasurer Vanderpol Resigns – The Dock Commissioners Consider His Answer Insufficient". Vol. 32, whole no. 9811. February 15, 1883. p. 8 (column 3, top). Retrieved November 25, 2018.
  1. NYTimes Archives → Blog.
  2. TimesMachine → Pdf (PDF); Permalink.
  3. Via Internet Archive (SIM Box ID: IA1661901, canister no. 04). IA Collection: SIM Microfilm; Periodicals; Pub: New York Times.
20. "Dock Board Responsibilities". Vol. 32, whole no. 9877. May 3, 1883. p. 2 (column 4, center). Retrieved November 26, 2018.
  1. NYTimes Archives → Blog.
  2. TimesMachine → Pdf (PDF); Permalink.
  3. Via Internet Archive (SIM Box ID: IA1661901, canister no. 04). IA Collection: SIM Microfilm; Periodicals; Pub: New York Times.
21. "The New Commissioners — Seven Confirmed and Three Rejected by the Aldermen — The Presidency of the Board of Health Alone Left Unfilled – The Votes Upon the Various Nominations". Vol. 32, whole no. 9883. May 10, 1883. p. 8 (columns 1–2, top). Retrieved November 26, 2018.
  1. NYTimes Archives → Blog.
  2. TimesMachine → Pdf (PDF); Permalink.
  3. Via Internet Archive (SIM Box ID: IA1661901, canister no. 04). IA Collection: SIM Microfilm; Periodicals; Pub: New York Times.
22. "Claiming a Water-Front". Vol. 33, whole no. 10087. January 3, 1884. p. 8 (column 2, bottom half). Retrieved May 26, 2018.
  1. NYTimes Archives → Blog.
  2. TimesMachine → Pdf (PDF); Permalink.
  3. Via Internet Archive (SIM Box ID: IA1661901, canister no. 04). IA Collection: SIM Microfilm; Periodicals; Pub: New York Times.
23. "Many New City Officers — The Mayor's Appointments a Surprise – Mr. Coleman to Succeed Mr. Asten – Mr. Voorhis Succeeds Mr. Matthews Who Becomes a Dock Commissioner". Vol. 34, whole no. 10509. May 10, 1885. pp. 1 & 2 (columns 7 & 1). Retrieved November 26, 2018.
  1. NYTimes Archives → Blog.
  2. TimesMachine → Pdf (PDF); Permalink.
  3. Via Internet Archive (SIM Box ID: IA1661901, canister no. 05). IA Collection: SIM Microfilm; Periodicals; Pub: New York Times.
24. "The Mayor's Appointments". Vol. 34, whole no. 10509. May 10, 1885. p. 8 (columns 2–3, bottom, top). Retrieved November 26, 2018.
  1. NYTimes Archives → Blog.
  2. TimesMachine → Pdf (PDF); Permalink.
  3. Via Internet Archive (SIM Box ID: IA1661901, canister no. 05). IA Collection: SIM Microfilm; Periodicals; Pub: New York Times.
25. "Expenses That Seemed Large – Dock Commissioners Trying to Show That They Are Economical". Vol. 35, whole no. 10670. November 13, 1885. p. 8 (column 2, top). Retrieved November 26, 2018.
  1. NYTimes Archives → Blog.
  2. TimesMachine → Pdf (PDF); Permalink.
  3. Via Internet Archive (SIM Box ID: IA1661901, canister no. 05). IA Collection: SIM Microfilm; Periodicals; Pub: New York Times.
  4. Fultonhistory.com (PDF).
26. "Appointed by the Mayor — Filling Six Vacant Seats in Departments — Three New Commissioners – Porter and Voorhis Retained – Croker Reappointed After Resigning". Vol. 36, whole no. 11135. May 10, 1887. p. 1 (column 5, top). Retrieved November 26, 2018.
  1. NYTimes Archives → Blog.
  2. TimesMachine → Pdf (PDF); Permalink.
  3. Via Internet Archive (SIM Box ID: IA1661901, canister no. 05). IA Collection: SIM Microfilm; Periodicals; Pub: New York Times.
27. "The New Dock Commissioner". Vol. 37, whole no. 11460. May 23, 1888. p. 9 (column 6, upper half). Retrieved November 26, 2018.
  1. NYTimes Archives → Blog.
  2. TimesMachine → Pdf (PDF); Permalink.
  3. Via Internet Archive (SIM Box ID: IA1661901, canister no. 06). IA Collection: SIM Microfilm; Periodicals; Pub: New York Times.
28. "Funeral of Lucius J. N. Stark". Vol. 38, whole no. 11606. November 9, 1888. p. 8 (column 1, bottom). Retrieved November 26, 2018.
  1. NYTimes Archives → Blog.
  2. TimesMachine → Pdf (PDF); Permalink.
  3. Via Internet Archive (SIM Box ID: IA1661901, canister no. 07). IA Collection: SIM Microfilm; Periodicals; Pub: New York Times.
29. "New Dock Commissioner". Vol. 38, whole no. 11643. December 22, 1888. p. 4 (column 5, bottom). Retrieved November 26, 2018.
  1. NYTimes Archives → Blog.
  2. TimesMachine → Pdf (PDF); Permalink.
  3. Via Internet Archive (SIM Box ID: IA1661901, canister no. 07). IA Collection: SIM Microfilm; Periodicals; Pub: New York Times.
30. "The Mayor's New Appointments". Vol. 38, whole no. 11773. May 23, 1889. p. 4 (columns 2–3, bottom, top). Retrieved November 26, 2018.
  1. NYTimes Archives → Blog.
  2. TimesMachine → Pdf (PDF); Permalink.
  3. Via Internet Archive (SIM Box ID: IA1661901, canister no. 07). IA Collection: SIM Microfilm; Periodicals; Pub: New York Times.
31. "Investigating in Secret – Commissioners of Accounts Said to be Looking Up Dock Matters". Vol. 39, whole no. 11918. November 8, 1889. p. 2 (column 4, middle). Retrieved November 26, 2018.
  1. NYTimes Archives → Blog.
  2. TimesMachine → Pdf (PDF); Permalink.
  3. Via Internet Archive (SIM Box ID: IA1661901, canister no. 07). IA Collection: SIM Microfilm; Periodicals; Pub: New York Times.
32. "Alleged "Dummy" Leases – The Investigation into the Methods of the Dock Department". Vol. 39, whole no. 11919. November 9, 1889. p. 5 (column 3, top). Retrieved November 26, 2018.
  1. NYTimes Archives → Blog.
  2. TimesMachine → Pdf (PDF); Permalink.
  3. Via Internet Archive (SIM Box ID: IA1661901, canister no. 07). IA Collection: SIM Microfilm; Periodicals; Pub: New York Times.
33. "Mr Post Was the Witness — The Head of the Dock Board Examined — He Said His Department Was 'Slightly Disorganized' – Things of Which He Was Ignorant". Vol. 39, whole no. 11939. December 3, 1889. p. 9 (column 1, top). Retrieved November 26, 2018.
  1. NYTimes Archives → Blog.
  2. TimesMachine → Pdf (PDF); Permalink.
  3. Via Internet Archive (SIM Box ID: IA1661901, canister no. 07). IA Collection: SIM Microfilm; Periodicals; Pub: New York Times.
34. "The Dock Board's Sins – Charges Served on Post and Matthews – The Mayor Summons Those Two Officers to Appear Before Him Tomorrow for Trial". Vol. 39, whole no. 11952. December 18, 1889. p. 8 (column 1, top). Retrieved November 26, 2018.
  1. NYTimes Archives → Blog.
  2. TimesMachine → Pdf (PDF); Permalink.
  3. Via Internet Archive (SIM Box ID: IA1661901, canister no. 07). IA Collection: SIM Microfilm; Periodicals; Pub: New York Times.
35. "Filing Their Answers – Accused Dock Commissioners Plead Custom – And Also Charge Political Favoritism Upon the Mayor, Who Is Ruffled and Makes Denial". Vol. 39, whole no. 11960. December 27, 1889. p. 8 (column 3, top). Retrieved November 26, 2018.
  1. NYTimes Archives → Blog.
  2. TimesMachine → Pdf (PDF); Permalink.
  3. Via Internet Archive (SIM Box ID: IA1661901, canister no. 07). IA Collection: SIM Microfilm; Periodicals; Pub: New York Times.
36. "Scannell Out in the Cold — Mayor Grant Announces His Appointments At Last – Eickhoff Succeeds Himself – Phelan Made Dock Commissioner – The Smith-Welde Deal Carried Out – A Cold Shoulder to Voorhis". Vol. 40, whole no. 12405. May 30, 1891. p. 8 (columns 4–5, top). Retrieved November 26, 2018.
  1. NYTimes Archives → Blog.
  2. TimesMachine → Pdf (PDF); Permalink.
  3. Newspapers.com.
37. "Places Filled by the Mayor — He Makes Fifteen Appointments and Clears His Desk — Bernard F. Martin a Police Justice and John J. Scanuell Reappointed Fire Commissioner – Brennan Not Touched – Many Surprises in the List – Curiosity as to Andrew J. White's Action in Accepting a Smaller Salary and Shorter Term Than He Had – Wanted a Change". Vol. 42, whole no. 13007. May 2, 1893. p. 9 (columns 1–2, top). Retrieved November 26, 2018.
  1. NYTimes Archives → Blog.
  2. TimesMachine → Pdf (PDF); Permalink.
  3. Via Internet Archive (SIM Box ID: IA1661902, canister no. 01). IA Collection: SIM Microfilm; Periodicals; Pub: New York Times.
38. "New Dock Commissioner – Gen. Edward C. O'Brien to Succeed Andrew J. White – Once Commissioner of Navigation – Because of the Good Record He Made, and Not for Political Reasons, He Was Appointed, Says Mayor Strong". Vol. 44, whole no. 13598. March 22, 1895. p. 9 (column 7, top). Retrieved November 26, 2018.
  1. NYTimes Archives → Blog.
  2. TimesMachine → Pdf (PDF); Permalink.
  3. Via Internet Archive (SIM Box ID: IA1661902, canister no. 03). IA Collection: SIM Microfilm; Periodicals; Pub: New York Times.
39. "Dock Board Reorganized — Edwin Einstein Made a Commissioner by Mayor Strong — Other City Officials Appointed — Mr. Einstein Was Surprised, but He Was Prompt – Dr. McSweeney Succeeds School Commissioner Gerard". Vol. 44, whole no. 13599. March 24, 1895. p. 3 (column 1, top). Retrieved November 26, 2018.
  1. NYTimes Archives → Blog.
  2. TimesMachine → Pdf (PDF); Permalink.
  3. Via Internet Archive (SIM Box ID: IA1661902, canister no. 03). IA Collection: SIM Microfilm; Periodicals; Pub: New York Times.
40. "Big Loss in City Rents – Over Half a Million Not Realized from a Single Pier – Lessee Sublet At a Heavy Profit – Dock Commissioner O'Brien's Inquiry Regarding Old Pier 40, Which the New-Jersey Steamboat Company Hired". Vol. 44, whole no. 13616. April 12, 1895. p. 1 (column 1, top). Retrieved November 26, 2018.
  1. NYTimes Archives → Blog.
  2. TimesMachine → Pdf (PDF); Permalink.
  3. Via Internet Archive (SIM Box ID: IA1661902, canister no. 03). IA Collection: SIM Microfilm; Periodicals; Pub: New York Times.
41. "New Men on Police Board — Messrs. Roosevelt, Parker, and Col. Grant Now Commissioners — John Monks For The Dock Board — Ex-Police Commissioners Murray and Kerwin, Who Refused to Resign, Send Letters to the Mayor – Kerwin Filled with Ire". Vol. 44, whole no. 13637. May 7, 1895. p. 8 (columns 1–3). Retrieved November 26, 2018.
  1. NYTimes Archives → Blog.
  2. TimesMachine → Pdf (PDF); Permalink.
  3. Via Internet Archive (SIM Box ID: IA1661902, canister no. 03). IA Collection: SIM Microfilm; Periodicals; Pub: New York Times.
42. "Accuses James J. Phelan – Builder Gillies's Testimony at the Dock Board Investigation – Money Asked For passing a Bill – Sent for by the Former Treasurer, He Says, and Asked How Much He Would Pay if a Penalty Were Not Imposed". Vol. 45, whole no. 13779. October 19, 1895. p. 9 (columns 1–2, top). Retrieved November 26, 2018.
  1. NYTimes Archives → Blog.
  2. TimesMachine → Pdf (PDF); Permalink.
  3. Via Internet Archive (SIM Box ID: IA41661204, canister no. 12). IA Collection: SIM Microfilm; Periodicals; Pub: New York Times Magazine.
43. "The New City Officials — As Announced by Mayor Van Wyck, the Slate Contains Some Surprises — Politicians Are Puzzled — Friends of Hugh J. Grant Seem to be Intentionally Ignored — The List as Given Out Yesterday". … [13] "Commissioners of Docks and Ferries". Vol. 47, whole no. 14469. January 2, 1898. p. 1 (columns 5–6). Retrieved October 9, 2016.
  1. NYTimes Archives → Blog.
  2. TimesMachine → Pdf (PDF); Permalink.
  3. Via Internet Archive (SIM Box ID: IA1661902, canister no. 06). IA Collection: SIM Microfilm; Periodicals; Pub: New York Times.
44. "Seth Low Takes the Mayor's Chair – Ex-Mayor Van Wyck Leaves the City Hall Alone – The New Executive Greeted with Courteous Words by His Predecessor Asks the People's Help in Redeeming His Solemn Pledges". Vol. 51, whole no. 16221. January 2, 1902. pp. 1 & 2 (columns 7 & 1). Retrieved October 9, 2016.
  1. NYTimes Archives → Blog.
  2. TimesMachine → Pdf (PDF); Permalink.
  3. Via Internet Archive (SIM Box ID: IA1661903, canister no. 03). IA Collection: SIM Microfilm; Periodicals; Pub: New York Times.
45. "M'Adoo Police Head — His Appointment Announced by the Mayor-Elect — Maurice Featherson Made Dock Commissioner and John C. Hertle and William Harmon Black Commissioners of Accounts". Vol. 53, whole no. 16839. December 24, 1903. pp. 1 & 2 (columns 7 & 1). Retrieved October 9, 2016.
  1. NYTimes Archives → Blog.
  2. TimesMachine → Pdf (PDF); Permalink.
  3. Via Internet Archive (SIM Box ID: IA1661903, canister no. 05). IA Collection: SIM Microfilm; Periodicals; Pub: New York Times.
46. "Mayor's Slate Out; Drops Murphy Men — Only Two Leaders Recognized in Distribution of Places — Gen. Bingham to Head Police — Delany, Woodbury, Darlington Retained — Featherson, Oakley and Best Out–Tammany Furious". Vol. 55, whole no. 17507. December 30, 1905. p. 1 (column 7). Retrieved October 9, 2016.
  1. NYTimes Archives → Blog.
  2. TimesMachine → Pdf (PDF); Permalink.
  3. Via Internet Archive (SIM Box ID: IA1661903, canister no. 03). IA Collection: SIM Microfilm; Periodicals; Pub: New York Times.
47. "Bensel Named to Succeed Simmons — Dock Commissioner Goes to Water Supply Board, Doubling His $6,000 Salary — Chosen From Among Three — Mr. Simmons Himself Suggested the Appointment–Mr. Bensel's Career". Vol. 57, whole no. 18269. January 31, 1908. p. 14 (column 4, top). Retrieved October 9, 2016.
  1. NYTimes Archives → Blog.
  2. TimesMachine → Pdf (PDF); Permalink.
  3. Via Internet Archive (SIM Box ID: IA1661904, canister no. 08). IA Collection: SIM Microfilm; Periodicals; Pub: New York Times.
48. "Hugh Bonner Heads Fire Department — This and Other Appointments by the Mayor Please Tammany Leader Murphy — Spooner Head of Docks — McClellan, In an Official Statement, Pleads for Democratic Unity Here for the Coming National Fight". Vol. 57, whole no. 18280. February 11, 1908. p. 6 (column 7). Retrieved October 9, 2016.
  1. NYTimes Archives → Blog.
  2. TimesMachine → Pdf (PDF); Permalink.
  3. Via Internet Archive (SIM Box ID: IA1661904, canister no. 08). IA Collection: SIM Microfilm; Periodicals; Pub: New York Times.
49. "Gaynor Names Six; Tiger Not Favored — Announcement Coupled with Praise of Murphy Who, Says the Mayor, Hasn't Horns — Waldo Fire Commissioner — Watson Corporation Counsel, Tomkins Dock Commissioner, and Hyde City Chamberlain". Vol. 59, whole no. 18972. January 3, 1910. p. 1 (column 7). Retrieved October 9, 2016.
  1. NYTimes Archives → Blog.
  2. TimesMachine → Pdf (PDF); Permalink.
  3. Via Internet Archive (SIM Box ID: IA1661924, canister no. 07). IA Collection: SIM Microfilm; Periodicals; Pub: New York Times.
50. "Tomkins Put Out; Smith in His Place — Mayor Makes a Quick Shift of Dock Commissioner to Get 'Full Co-Operation' — Move Had Been Expected — Opposition to Shore Front Plan the Reason – 'I'm Out, But I Didn't Resign,' Says Tomkins". Vol. 62, whole no. 20158. April 3, 1913. p. 1 (column 3, top). Retrieved October 9, 2016.
  1. NYTimes Archives → Blog.
  2. TimesMachine → Pdf (PDF); Permalink.
  3. Via Internet Archive (SIM Box ID: IA1661925, canister no. 03). IA Collection: SIM Microfilm; Periodicals; Pub: New York Times.
51. "Named by Hylan For Big City Posts — Alfred J. Johnson, City Chamberlain, Has Prominent Wall Street Connections — Many Veterans Appointed — Bird S. Coler, W.P. Burr, N.J. Hayes, J.A. Cantor, and Arthur Murphy All on the List". Vol. 67, whole no. 21893. January 2, 1918. p. 3 (columns 5–8, top). Retrieved October 9, 2016.
  1. NYTimes Archives → Blog.
  2. TimesMachine → Pdf (PDF); Permalink.
  3. Via Internet Archive (SIM Box ID: IA1661929, canister no. 07). IA Collection: SIM Microfilm; Periodicals; Pub: New York Times.
52. "Delaney Appointed Dock Commissioner — Former Transit Commissioner Is Named by Mayor to Succeed Murray Hulbert". Vol. 71, whole no. 23325. December 4, 1921. p. 18 (column 1, bottom). Retrieved October 10, 2016.
  1. NYTimes Archives → Blog.
  2. TimesMachine → Pdf (PDF); Permalink.
  3. Via Internet Archive (SIM Box ID: IA1661908, canister no. 04). IA Collection: SIM Microfilm; Periodicals; Pub: New York Times.
53. "Hylan Swears in His Subway Board — Mayor Names J.H. Delaney Chairman, With W.A. De Ford, Hearst's Counsel, a Member — D.L. Ryan is the Third — He Quits $8,000 Finance Job and Says He Will Quit Tammany Secretaryship — Deputy Becomes Dock Commissioner and J.J. O'Brien Director of the Port". Vol. 73, whole no. 24266. July 2, 1924. p. 21 (column 1, top). Retrieved October 10, 2016.
  1. NYTimes Archives → Blog.
  2. TimesMachine → Pdf (PDF); Permalink.
  3. Via Internet Archive (SIM Box ID: IA1661909, canister no. 03). IA Collection: SIM Microfilm; Periodicals; Pub: New York Times.
54. "Michael Cosgrove, City Dock Head, Dies — Tammany Leader of the 16th Assembly District a Victim of Heart Disease — Close Friend of Wagner — Known as Senator's Political Sponsor – Native of Ireland Was Patron of Sports". Vol. 80, whole no. 26760. May 1, 1931. p. 27 (column 1, top). Retrieved October 10, 2016.
  1. NYTimes Archives → Blog.
  2. TimesMachine → Pdf (PDF); Permalink.
  3. Via Internet Archive (SIM Box ID: IA1661929, canister no. 06). IA Collection: SIM Microfilm; Periodicals; Pub: New York Times (limited preview).
55. "M'Kenzie Is Named as City Dock Chief — Walker Interrupts Meeting to Surprise Chief Clerk With $15,000 Appointment — Praises Veteran's Ability — Cosgrove's Successor Has Served the Department for 28 Years – Is Member of Bar". Vol. 80, whole no. 26780. May 21, 1931. p. 29 (column 2, top). Retrieved October 10, 2016.
  1. NYTimes Archives → Blog.
  2. TimesMachine → Pdf (PDF); Permalink.
  3. Via Internet Archive (SIM Box ID: IA1661929, canister no. 06). IA Collection: SIM Microfilm; Periodicals; Pub: New York Times (limited preview).
56. "M'Kenzie Assumes Dock Post Today — He Predicts New Era for Port, Pointing to Pier Construction and Sheepshead Bay Project — Urges Lighterage Peace — Commissioner Also Foresees Benefits for New York in the Building of Several Larger Liners". Vol. 80, whole no. 26784. May 25, 1931. p. 39 (column 1, top). Retrieved October 10, 2016.
  1. NYTimes Archives → Blog.
  2. TimesMachine → Pdf (PDF); Permalink.
  3. Via Internet Archive (SIM Box ID: IA1661929, canister no. 06). IA Collection: SIM Microfilm; Periodicals; Pub: New York Times (limited preview).
57. "Airport Success, Mayor Declares — Rises in Traffic and Revenue at La Guardia Field Cited in Reply to Critics — Road System Is Opened — Site to Supplement Service of Terminal Said to Have Been Chosen in the Bronx". Vol. 91, whole no. 30600. November 4, 1941. p. 25 (column 1, top). Retrieved October 10, 2016.
  1. NYTimes Archives → Blog.
  2. TimesMachine → Pdf (PDF); Permalink.
  3. Via Internet Archive (SIM Box ID: IA1661906, canister no. 01). IA Collection: SIM Microfilm; Periodicals; Pub: New York Times (limited preview).
- Scientific American (June 6, 1896). "The Improvement of the New River Water Front, New York City". Scientific American (Variations of George Sears Greene, Jr.). Vol. 74, no. 23. p. 360 – via Internet Archive.
- Official Records of the Union and Confederate Navies in the War of the Rebellion. Series I. Published Under the Direction of the Hon. Hilary Abner Herbert (1834–1919), Secretary of the Navy, by Lieut. Commander Richard Rush, U. S. Navy, Superintendent Naval War Records, and Robert Harris Woods (1860–1951). LCCN 06-35188; OCLC 5194016 (all editions).
1. Vol. 4: "Operations on the Potomac and Rappahannock Rivers from January 5 to December 7, 1861". 1896. p. 604.
- Thomson, John Crawford (1861–1926) (1901). The Greater New York Charter of 1901, Together With Constitutional Provisions Affecting the City; Provisions of the Charter of 1897, Continued Until Changed by the Board of Aldermen; The Tenement House Law; The Building Code; and The Colonial Charters. With Notes. Chapter XVI, Title 1, § 816. New York, New York: The Lawyers' Co-operative Publishing Company. pp. 454–455. LCCN 01-21801; OCLC 10163954 (all editions).

=== Primary references ===
- Annual Report of the Department of Docks. City of New York. LCCN 06-11077; OCLC 870522779 (all editions), OCLC 18044912 (all editions).
1. Fifth → Report of General Charles K. Graham, Engineer-in-Chief of the Department of Docks, for the Year Terminating April 30, 1875, Together with Addenda Prepared Subsequent to His Resignation of That Position. 1875 – via Internet Archive (Library of Congress).
2. Seventh, for the Year Ending April 30, 1877. Commissioners Salem Howe Wales (1825–1902), Jacob Aaron Westervelt (1800–1879), Henry Farnam Dimock (1842–1911). 1877 – via Google Books (Harvard).
3. Eighth, for the Year Ending April 30, 1878. Commissioners Jacob Aaron Westervelt (1800–1879), Henry Farnam Dimock (1842–1911), Jacob Vanderpoel II (1812–1884). 1878 – via Internet Archive (New York Public Library).
4. Tenth, For the Year Ending April 30, 1880. Commissioners Henry Farnam Dimock (1842–1911), Jacob Vanderpoel II (1812–1884). 1880. p. 587 – via Internet Archive (University of Illinois at Urbana-Champaign).
5. Eleventh, for the Year Ending April 30, 1881. Commissioners Henry Farnam Dimock (1842–1911), Jacob Vanderpoel II (1812–1884), William Laimbeer, Jr. (1821–1886). 1881. p. 587 – via Internet Archive (New York Public Library).
6. Twelfth, for the Year Ending April 30, 1882. Commissioners Jacob Vanderpoel II (1812–1884), William Laimbeer, Jr. (1821–1886), John Richard Voorhis (1829–1932). 1882 – via Internet Archive (New York Public Library).
7. Fifthteenth, for the Year Ending April 30, 1885. Commissioners Lucius J. N. Stark (1816–1888), William Laimbeer, Jr. (1821–1886), John Richard Voorhis (1829–1932). 1885 – via Internet Archive (New York Public Library).
8. Seventeenth, For the Year Ending April 30, 1887. Commissioners Lucius J. N. Stark (1816–1888), James E. Matthews (1827–1891), Joseph Koch (1843–1902). 1887 – via Google Books (Harvard).
9. Eighteenth, for the Year Ending April 30, 1888. Commissioners Lucius J. N. Stark (1816–1888), James E. Matthews (1827–1891), Charles Henry Marshall, Jr. (1838–1912). 1888 – via Internet Archive (New York Public Library).
10. Nineteenth, for the Year Ending April 30, 1889. Commissioners Edwin Augustus Post (1829–1912), James E. Matthews (1827–1891), Charles Augustus Silliman (1830–1906). 1889 – via Internet Archive (New York Public Library).
11. Twentieth, for the Year Ending April 30, 1890. Commissioners Edwin Augustus Post (1829–1912), James E. Matthews (1827–1891), John Sergeant Cram, Sr. (1851–1936). 1890 – via Internet Archive (New York Public Library).
12. Twenty-Second, for the Year Ending April 30, 1892. Commissioners John Sergeant Cram, Sr. (1851–1936), Edwin Augustus Post (1829–1912), James Joseph Phelan (1846–1908). p. 587 – via Internet Archive (New York Public Library).
13. Twenty-Third, for the Year Ending April 30, 1893. Commissioners John Sergeant Cram, Sr. (1851–1936), Edwin Augustus Post (1829–1912), James Joseph Phelan (1846–1908). 1893. p. 587 – via Google Books (Harvard).
14. Twenty-Fourth, for the Year Ending April 30, 1894. Commissioners John Sergeant Cram, Sr. (1851–1936), James Joseph Phelan (1846–1908), Andrew J. White (1845–1900). 1894 – via Internet Archive (New York Public Library).
15. Twenty-Fifth, for the Year Ending April 30, 1995. Commissioners Edward Charles O'Brien (1860–1927), Edwin Einstein (1842–1905), John M. Monks (1832–1917). 1895 – via Internet Archive (New York Public Library).
16. Twenty-Seventh, for the Year Ending April 30, 1897. Commissioners Edward Charles O'Brien (1860–1927), Edwin Einstein (1842–1905), John M. Monks (1832–1917). 1897 – via Internet Archive (New York Public Library).
17. Thirtieth, for the Year Ending December 31, 1900. Commissioners John Sergeant Cram, Sr. (1851–1936), Charles Francis Murphy (1858–1924), Peter F. Meyer (1857–1927). 1901 – via Google Books (Harvard).
18. Forty-Fourth, for the Year Ending December 31, 1915. Commissioner Robert Alexander Conrad Smith (1857–1933). 1915 – via Wikimedia Commons (Avery Library).
19. Forty-Sixth, for the Year Ending December 31, 1917. Commissioner George Murray Hulbert (1881–1950). 1917 – via HathiTrust (Harvard).
20. Forty-Seventh, for the Year Ending December 31, 1918. Commissioner George Murray Hulbert (1881–1950). 1918 – via Google Books (Harvard).
21. Fifty-First, for the Year Ending December 31, 1922. Acting Commissioner Hitch Harrison. 1922 – via HathiTrust (Harvard).
22. ––––––––––––––––––––
23. Vols. 7–45 (1877–1915) – via HathiTrust (some missing).
- Index to Minutes of Department of Docks for the Years 1870 to 1890 (5 Vols). New York: Metropolitan Printing Company. 1897. OCLC 1226738897 (all editions)
1. Vol. 1: "Aarons – Butler (Patrick)".
2. Vol. 3: "Hayden – Pier".
3. Vol. 5: "Poll Clerks – 'Zophar Mills'".
- Index to Minutes of Department of Docks for the Years 1891 to 1893 (1 Vol.). New York: Metropolitan Printing Company. 1906. OCLC 1226739842 (all editions)
- Report of an Examination Made by the Commissioners of Accounts in the Affairs of the Department of Docks, from May, 1870, to April 20, 1881. New York: Martin B. Brown , Printer and Stationer. OCLC 48886924 (all editions)
1. Via Google Books (Columbia University).
