= James Daly (American politician) =

American merchant and politician (1844–1892)

Member of the New York Senate from the 7th district
- In office 1882–1887
- Preceded by: Ferdinand Eidman
- Succeeded by: George F. Langbein

Member of the New York State Assembly from the New York County, 14th district
- In office 1878–1878
- Preceded by: Luke F. Cozans
- Succeeded by: P. Henry Dugro

Member of the New York State Assembly from the New York County, 14th district
- In office 1874–1875
- Preceded by: Charles G. Cornell
- Succeeded by: P. J. Carty

Personal details
- Born: August 15, 1844 County Westmeath, Ireland
- Died: March 20, 1892 (aged 47) New York City, New York, U.S.
- Party: Democratic
- Education: Queen's College, Galway
- Occupation: Merchant, broker, politician

James Daly (August 15, 1844 – March 20, 1892) was an Irish-American merchant, broker, and politician from New York. He served in the New York State Assembly and the New York State Senate.

== Early life and education ==
Daly was born on August 15, 1844, in County Westmeath, Ireland. He attended Queen's College in Galway. He then emigrated to New York City, where he became a merchant and broker.

== Political career ==
Daly entered politics by joining the Democratic Reform movement against the Tweed Ring.

He was a member of the New York State Assembly (New York County, 14th District) in 1874 and 1875, and again in 1878.

He was a member of the New York State Senate (7th District) from 1882 to 1887, sitting in the 105th through 110th legislatures.

== Death ==
Daly died on March 20, 1892, at his home at 174 Second Avenue in New York City, of heart failure following an attack of the grip (influenza). He was 47 years old.

New York State Assembly
Preceded by Charles G. Cornell	New York State Assembly; New York County, 14th District; 1874–1875	Succeeded by P. J. Carty
Preceded by Luke F. Cozans	New York State Assembly; New York County, 14th District; 1878	Succeeded by P. Henry Dugro
New York State Senate
Preceded by Ferdinand Eidman	New York State Senate; 7th District; 1882–1887	Succeeded by George F. Langbein
