= Wilhelm Schirmer =

German landscape painter (1802–1866)

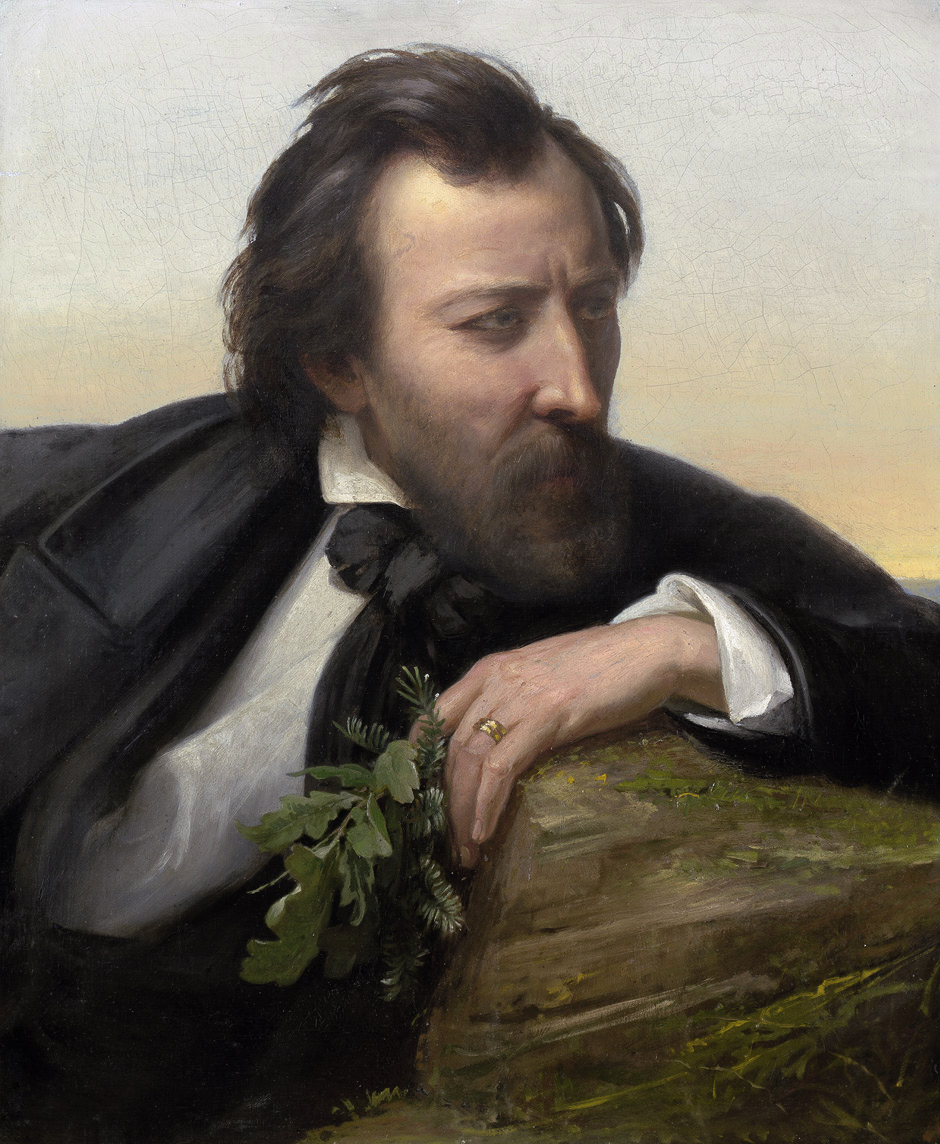

August Wilhelm Ferdinand Schirmer (6 May 1802 – 8 June 1866) was a German landscape artist.

== Biography ==
Schirmer was born in Berlin. As a youth Schirmer painted flowers in the royal porcelain factory; afterwards he became a pupil of Friedrich Wilhelm Schadow in the Berlin Academy, but his art owed most to Italy. In 1827 he went to Italy, where his sojourn extended over three years. He became a disciple of his countryman Joseph Koch, who built historic landscape on the Poussins, and is said to have caught inspiration from J. M. W. Turner. In 1831 Schirmer established himself in Berlin in a studio with scholars. From 1839 to 1865 he was professor of landscape in the academy.

Schirmer's place in the history of art is distinctive. His sketches in Italy were more than transcripts of the spots; he studied nature with the purpose of composing historic and poetic landscapes. On the completion of the Berlin Museum of Antiquities came his opportunity. Upon the walls he painted classic sites and temples, and elucidated the collections by the landscape scenery with which they were historically associated.

Schirmer's goal was to make his art the poetic interpretation of nature and he deemed technique secondary to conception.
