= Senator Lent =

Senator Lent may refer to:

- Abraham Lent (New York politician) (1815–1882), New York State Senate
- Berkeley Lent (1921–2007), Oregon State Senate
- Dave Lent (fl. 1990s–2010s), Idaho State Senate
- Norman F. Lent (1931–2012), New York State Senate
