= R. A. C. Smith =

Robert Alexander Conrad Smith
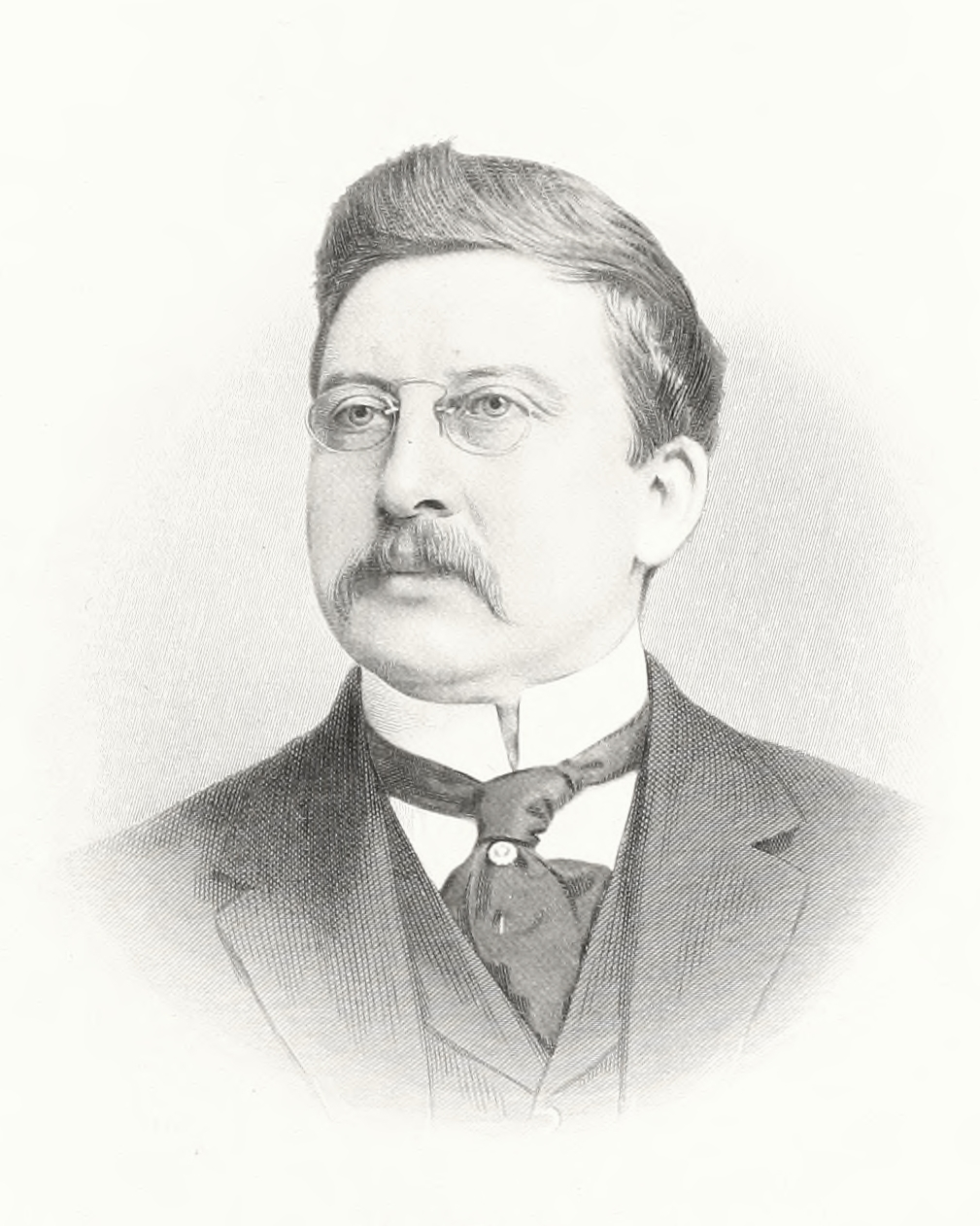

Commissioner of Docks and Ferries
- In office 1913–?
- Appointed by: William Jay Gaynor
- Preceded by: Calvin Tomkins

Personal details
- Born: February 22, 1857 Dover, England
- Died: July 27, 1933 (aged 76) Southampton, England
- Spouse: Alice Williams

Robert Alexander Conrad Smith (February 22, 1857 – July 27, 1933) was the Commissioner of Docks and Ferries in New York City and a member of the Port and Terminal Committee of the New York City Board of Estimate. He was also an entrepreneur in Cuba, where he developed and operated railroads and utilities.

== Biography ==
Robert Alexander Conrad Smith was born in Dover, England, on February 22, 1857 and then his family moved to Spain, where he spent the next twelve years of his life, until 1869. He returned to England for his education. Three years after his return to England, he made trip to the United States.

He began work on construction of railroads in Cuba, prior to the Spanish–American War. He also operated the gas and electric lighting system of Havana. He consolidated smaller companies into a single corporation. He also built the waterworks for Havana.

After moving to the United States he became Commissioner of Docks and Ferries in New York City succeeding Calvin Tomkins.

In 1903, Smith purchased the steamer Anstice and converted her into a yacht at the Harlan and Hollingsworth Company in Wilmington, Delaware. On April 24, 1907, Smith's Anstice name was changed to Privateer. Smith and his friends sailed on the Privateer for the Jamestown Exposition, commemorating the 300th anniversary of the founding of Jamestown in the Virginia Colony. The yacht was renamed the Sandy Hook in 1914.

In 1915 he asked the city to cut his salary by $2,500, with the saved money to go to his assistants in his department. He reduced the departmental budget by $184,000 and wanted to trim the head count.

Smith died in Southampton, England, on July 27, 1933, after cerebrovascular accident while on an ocean voyage.
