= George F. Roesch =

American politician, lawyer, and judge (1855–1917)

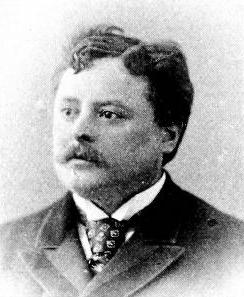
- Roesch in 1893

Assistant New York County District Attorney
- In office 1916–1917

Justice of the Fourth District Municipal Court
- In office 1894–1909

Member of the New York Senate from the 7th district
- In office 1890–1893
- Preceded by: George F. Langbein
- Succeeded by: Martin T. McMahon

Member of the New York State Assembly from the New York County, 10th district
- In office 1888–1889
- Preceded by: George F. Langbein
- Succeeded by: William Sohmer

Member of the New York State Assembly from the New York County, 10th district
- In office 1885–1885
- Preceded by: Charles A. Binder
- Succeeded by: Charles A. Binder

Member of the New York State Assembly from the New York County, 10th district
- In office 1883–1883
- Preceded by: John C. Niglutsch
- Succeeded by: Charles A. Binder

Personal details
- Born: June 19, 1855 New York City, New York, U.S.
- Died: December 21, 1917 (aged 62) The Bronx, New York City, New York, U.S.
- Party: Democratic
- Spouse: Frances Lederle
- Children: 3
- Education: Columbia Law School
- Occupation: Lawyer, politician, judge

George Francis Roesch (June 19, 1855 – December 21, 1917) was an American lawyer, politician, and judge from New York. He served in the New York State Assembly and New York State Senate, and later as a municipal court justice and assistant district attorney.

== Early life and education ==
Roesch was born on June 19, 1855, in New York City. He attended St. Nicholas Parochial School, De La Salle Institute, and Columbia Law School. He was admitted to the bar in 1876 and practiced law in New York City.

He married Frances Lederle, and they had three sons.

== Political career ==
Roesch was a member of the New York State Assembly (New York County, 10th District) in 1883, 1885, 1888, and 1889.

He was a member of the New York State Senate (7th District) from 1890 to 1893, sitting in the 113th, 114th, 115th, and 116th New York State Legislatures.

== Judicial and later career ==
Roesch was elected Justice of the Fourth District Municipal Court in 1894 and served until 1909.

In 1909, he ran for the City Court but was defeated.

In 1910, he was appointed Second Deputy State Fire Marshal, and later that year was promoted to First Deputy.

He served as Assistant New York County District Attorney from 1916 until his death.

== Death ==
Roesch died on December 21, 1917, in St. Francis Hospital in The Bronx, New York City, of a stomach disease. He was 62 years old.

New York State Assembly
Preceded by John C. Niglutsch	New York State Assembly; New York County, 10th District; 1883	Succeeded by Charles A. Binder
Preceded by Charles A. Binder	New York State Assembly; New York County, 10th District; 1885	Succeeded by Charles A. Binder
Preceded by George F. Langbein	New York State Assembly; New York County, 10th District; 1888–1889	Succeeded by William Sohmer
New York State Senate
Preceded by George F. Langbein	New York State Senate; 7th District; 1890–1893	Succeeded by Martin T. McMahon
