= Bernard Kelly (American politician) =

American politician

Bernard Kelly (born c. 1823 New York City) was an American politician from New York.

== Life ==
He married Hannah Ann Doxey (d. 1902). He was for two terms Superintendent of Wharves, Piers and Slips.

As a Democrat, he was a member of the New York State Senate (5th D.) in 1860 and 1861; and an Alderman of New York City (12th D.) in 1864 and 1865.

In 1870, Kelly oversaw the construction of swimming baths for the New York State Department of Public Works.

== Sources ==
- The New York Civil List compiled by Franklin Benjamin Hough, Stephen C. Hutchins and Edgar Albert Werner (1867; pg. 442)
- Biographical Sketches of the State Officers and Members of the Legislature of the State of New York by William D. Murphy (1861; pg. 68ff)
- Manual of the Corporation of New York (1864; pg. 49)
- OBITUARY; KELLY - On Nov. 29, Hannah Ann Doxey... in NYT on December 2, 1902

New York State Senate
Preceded by Smith Ely, Jr.	New York State Senate; 5th District; 1860–1861	Succeeded by Charles G. Cornell
