= William Laimbeer Jr. =

American politician

William Laimbeer Jr. (June 7, 1821 – November 28, 1886) was an English-American builder and politician.

== Life ==
Laimbeer was born on June 7, 1821, in Devon, England. He immigrated to America with his father and brother when he was six, settling in New York City, New York.

Laimbeer served as an apprentice under his father, a builder. After he came of age, he entered the building trade and worked in the business until 1866. He was prominent in the construction of the a number of buildings in New York City. A member of the 7th Regiment Veterans, he served on the building committee of the Seventh Regiment Armory. An active member of the Volunteer Fire Department, he was mustered out as Assistant Foreman of a company and took an active part in organizing the paid department.

In 1859, Laimbeer was a member of the New York City Council. He was originally a Whig. In 1863, he was elected to the New York State Senate as a Republican, representing New York's 6th State Senate district (the 9th, 15th, 16th, and 18th wards of Manhattan). He served in the Senate in 1864 and 1865. He was a delegate to the 1872 Republican National Convention. In 1873, Mayor Havemeyer appointed him a Commissioner of Charities and Corrections, a position he served for 18 months and then resigned from. In 1880, he became a Commissioner of Docks to fill Jacob Aaron Westervelt's unexpired term. He resigned as commissioner for health reasons in 1885.

Laimbeer was a member of the Freemasons and the Mechanics and Tradesmen Society. He was married and had two sons, Richard M. and William E.

Laimbeer died at home of consumption on November 28, 1886. He was buried in Woodlawn Cemetery.

New York State Senate
Preceded by John J. Bradley	New York State Senate; 6th District; 1864–1865	Succeeded by Abraham Lent
