= Charles G. Cornell =

American politician (1827–1906)

Charles Griffen Cornell (February 12, 1827 New York City – April 16, 1906, NYC) was a New York State senator.

== Life ==
He was a butcher. He was a Councilman (5th D.) in 1858 and 1859; President of the Board of Councilmen in 1859; and an Alderman (10th D.) in 1860 and 1861.

Having been a State Militia officer, he joined the Union Army at the beginning of the American Civil War, and fought in the First Battle of Bull Run.

He was a member of the New York State Senate (5th D.) in 1862 and 1863.

On December 3, 1862, Cornell was appointed by Mayor George Opdyke as New York City Street Commissioner. He resigned on November 17, 1866.

He was again a member of the State Senate in 1866 and 1867.

He was a member of the New York State Assembly (New York Co., 14th D.) in 1873.

== Sources ==
- The New York Civil List compiled by Franklin Benjamin Hough, Stephen C. Hutchins and Edgar Albert Werner (1870; pg. 443)
- Biographical Sketches of the State Officers and the Members of the Legislature of the State of New York in 1862 and '63 by William D. Murphy (1863; pg. 62ff)
- Manual of the Corporation of the City of New York by D. T. Valentine (1866; pg. 414)
- Manual of the Corporation of New York by Joseph Shannon (1869; pg. 597)
- CITY CORRUPTION; Charges Against the Street Commissioner, Charles G. Cornell in NYT on October 11, 1866
- RESIGNATION OF STREET COMMISSIONER CORNELL in NYT on November 18, 1866
- Dismissal of the Charges Against Ex-Street Commissioner Cornell in NYT on November 27, 1866
- MAYOR HEWITT SCORES ONE; ...ATTEMPT TO APPOINT CHARLES G. CORNELL BLOCKED... in NYT on July 20, 1887

New York State Senate
Preceded by Bernard Kelly	New York State Senate; 5th District; 1862–1863	Succeeded by Luke F. Cozans
Preceded by Luke F. Cozans	New York State Senate; 5th District; 1866–1867	Succeeded by Michael Norton
New York State Assembly
Preceded by John A. Foley	New York State Assembly; New York County, 14th District; 1873	Succeeded by James Daly
