= Anthony Eickhoff =

American politician (1827–1901)

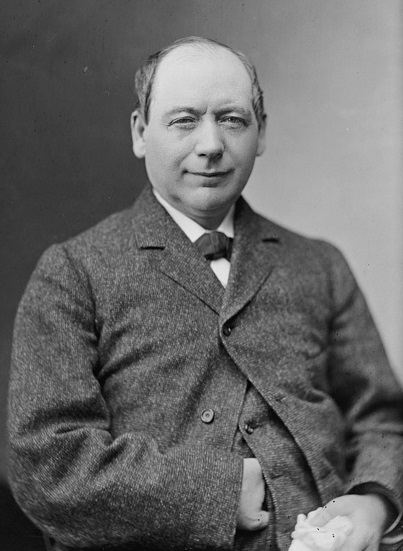

Member of the U.S. House of Representatives from New York's 7th district
- In office March 4, 1877 – March 4, 1879
- Preceded by: David Dudley Field II
- Succeeded by: Edwin Einstein

New York City Fire Commissioner
- In office 1891–1896

Coroner of New York County
- In office 1874–1876

Member of the New York State Assembly from the 10th district
- In office January 1, 1864 – August 1, 1864
- Preceded by: Daniel M. O'Brien
- Succeeded by: Thomas J. Creamer

Personal details
- Born: Gerhard Anton Eickhoff; September 11, 1827 Lippstadt, Benninghausen, Prussia
- Died: November 5, 1901 (aged 74) New York City, New York, U.S.
- Resting place: Green-Wood Cemetery
- Party: Democratic
- Spouse: Louise Elisa Neuenschwander (m. 1855)

Gerhard Anton Eickhoff (September 11, 1827 – November 5, 1901) was a German-American journalist, editor, author, lawyer, Congressman from New York, United States Treasury auditor, and New York City Fire Commissioner.

== Biography ==
He was born in the rural hamlet Kaldewei, part of the village of Benninghausen, Prussia, today suburbanized into Lippstadt, North Rhine-Westphalia, Germany. His parents Caspar Eickhoff (1803–1867) and Maria Catharina Trockel (1803–1863) and their forefathers were peasants in the hamlet Kaldewei, born in serfdom to the Cistercian Cloister of Benninghausen (founded in 1240, secularized in 1804), but ultimately released from serfdom by the Grand Duke in 1809.

After his school education he started to work as a teacher in Lippstadt and publicized radical writings in pre-revolutionary Prussia until 1847. In 1847 he decided to emigrate to the United States and boarded the ship Itzstein & Welcker sailing from Bremen on October 24, 1847, and arrived in New Orleans on January 6, 1848.

He married Louise Elisa Neuenschwander around 1855. She immigrated from Switzerland to the United States. Their children were Henry Eickhoff (January 17, 1856 – October 17, 1933) and two daughters. Anthony Eickhoff's grandson was lawyer Henry Eickhoff, Jr. (February 17, 1898 – August 12, 1954).

=== First profession and journalism (1848–1856) ===
His first employment was as deckhand on a Mississippi steamboat, later he became a teacher in a Jesuit school in St. Louis and studied law. Early he began to work as journalist, founder and editor of several German newspapers. In St. Louis, Missouri, he was founder and editor of St. Louis Zeitung in 1848 and 1849. In Dubuque, Iowa, he edited Der Nordwestliche Demokrat, later named Iowa Staatszeitung, from 1849 to 1850. In Louisville, Kentucky, it was Der Beobachter am Ohio, edited 1850–1852. Finally he settled in New York City: he edited Die Abendpost in 1852 and New Yorker Staats-Zeitung from 1854 to 1856. He became naturalized in 1855 and practiced law.

=== Serving New York State, Congress and Treasury Department (1863 to 1889) ===
During the civil war he served as Commissary General of Subsistence for the State of New York troops, appointed in 1863. In 1864 he was elected to the New York State Legislature. In 1876 he was elected as Democrat to the 45th Congress as a representative of the 7th district of New York (March 4, 1877 – March 3, 1879), but was an unsuccessful candidate in re-election to the 46th Congress in 1878. Later he was Fifth Auditor in the United States Treasury Department from August 1, 1885, to May 17, 1889.

=== Serving as New York City municipality official 1889 to 1901 ===
In 1874 he was elected Coroner of New York City until 1876. He became the Fire Commissioner of New York City in 1889, re-appointed until 1896 and served as an Auditor of the New York City Fire Department from 1898 until his death in 1901.

== Death and burial ==
He died on November 5, 1901, in New York City and is buried in Green-Wood Cemetery.

== Works ==
- In der Neuen Heimath: geschichtliche Mittheilungen über die deutschen Einwanderer in allen Theilen der Union; Steiger & Co., New York City 1st edition 1884, 2nd edition 1885; German
- Mexico. Aus einer Discussion in einem deutschen demokratischen Vereine zu New York; 1865, New York City Library; German

New York State Assembly
Preceded by Daniel M. O'Brien	New York State Assembly; New York County, 10th District; 1864	Succeeded by Thomas J. Creamer
U.S. House of Representatives
Preceded by David Dudley Field II	Member of the U.S. House of Representatives from New York's 7th congressional district 1877 - 1879	Succeeded by Edwin Einstein
