= Hervey C. Calkin =

American politician

Hervey Chittenden Calkin
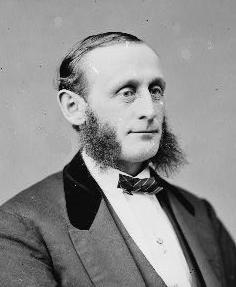
- Calkin circa 1860–1870

Member of the U.S. House of Representatives from New York's 7th congressional district
- In office March 4, 1869 – March 3, 1871
- Preceded by: John Winthrop Chanler
- Succeeded by: Smith Ely, Jr.

Personal details
- Born: March 23, 1828 Malden, New York, US
- Died: April 20, 1913 (aged 85) Bronx, New York City, US
- Resting place: Woodlawn Cemetery
- Party: Democratic

Hervey Chittenden Calkin (March 23, 1828 – April 20, 1913) was an American tradesman and politician who served one term as a U.S. representative from New York from 1869 to 1871,

== Life and career ==
Hervey Calkin was born in Malden, New York on March 23, 1828. He was educated locally, and moved to New York City in 1847.

Calkin was employed in the Morgan Iron Works for five years. In 1852 he commenced business as a plumber and coppersmith in partnership with his brother. He also sold other metalware, including stoves and tinware.

Calkin also became an advocate for the creation of a domestic shipbuilding industry, as opposed to buying ships from England.

=== Tenure in Congress ===
He was elected as a Democrat to the Forty-first Congress and served from (March 4, 1869 – March 3, 1871). He was not a candidate for reelection in 1870.

=== Later career ===
After leaving Congress, Calkin resumed his former business pursuits in New York City until retiring in 1904. In 1871 he received a patent for a life raft made of two cylindrical metal floats with conical ends and a plank deck.

=== Death ===
He died in the Bronx on April 20, 1913, and was interred in Woodlawn Cemetery.

== External resources ==
- United States Congress. "Hervey C. Calkin (id: C000047)". Biographical Directory of the United States Congress.

U.S. House of Representatives
| Preceded by John Winthrop Chanler | Member of the U.S. House of Representatives from New York's 7th congressional district 1869 - 1871 | Succeeded by Smith Ely, Jr. |
