= Thomas J. Creamer =

American politician (1843–1914)

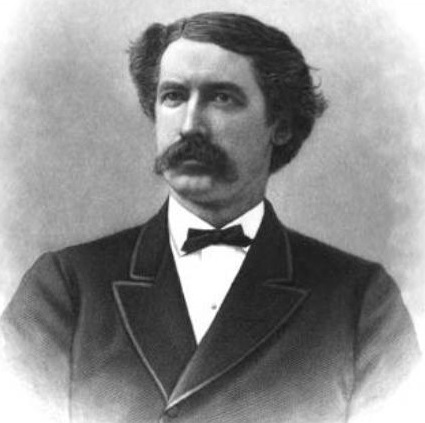

Member of the U.S. House of Representatives from New York
- In office March 4, 1901 – March 3, 1903
- Preceded by: Daniel J. Riordan
- Succeeded by: Timothy Sullivan
- Constituency: 8th district
- In office March 4, 1873 – March 3, 1875
- Preceded by: Smith Ely Jr.
- Succeeded by: Smith Ely Jr.
- Constituency: 7th district

Member of the New York State Assembly
- In office 1889
- Preceded by: Louis P. Rannow
- Succeeded by: William Sulzer
- Constituency: 14th New York
- In office 1865–1867
- Preceded by: Anthony Eickhoff
- Succeeded by: James McKiever
- Constituency: 10th New York (1865–66); 14th New York (1867)

Member of the New York State Senate from the 6th District
- In office 1868–1871
- Preceded by: Abraham Lent
- Succeeded by: Augustus Weismann

Personal details
- Born: May 26, 1843 County Leitrim, Ireland
- Died: August 4, 1914 (aged 71) New York City, New York, U.S.
- Party: Democratic

Thomas James Creamer (May 26, 1843 – August 4, 1914) was an American lawyer and politician from New York who served two non-consecutive terms in the U.S. House of Representatives from 1873 to 1875, and from 1901 to 1903

== Early life ==
Born near Lough Garadice, County Leitrim, Ireland, Creamer immigrated to the United States and took up residence in New York City. He attended the public schools and became a shipping clerk in a dry-goods house in 1860. Then he studied law, was admitted to the bar and practiced.

== Political career ==
Creamer was a member of the New York State Assembly in 1865, 1866 (New York Co., 10th D.), 1867 and 1889 (New York Co., 14th D.)

Creamer was in the New York State Senate from 1868 to 1871, sitting in the 91st, 92nd, 93rd and 94th New York State Legislatures.

Creamer was a New York City Tax Commissioner for five years, and acted as counsel for State commissions to revise the tax laws.

=== Congress ===
Creamer was elected as a Democrat to the 43rd United States Congress, holding office from March 4, 1873, to March 3, 1875. He returned for the 57th United States Congress, from March 4, 1901, to March 3, 1903.

== Law and death ==
Creamer resumed practicing law in New York City, and died there August 4, 1914. He was interred in Green-Wood Cemetery.

New York State Assembly
Preceded by Anthony Eickhoff	New York State Assembly; New York County, 10th District; 1865–1866	Succeeded by Owen Murphy
Preceded by Gideon J. Tucker	New York State Assembly; New York County, 14th District; 1867	Succeeded by James McKiever
Preceded by Louis P. Rannow	New York State Assembly; New York County, 14th District; 1889	Succeeded by William Sulzer
New York State Senate
Preceded by Abraham Lent	New York State Senate; 6th District; 1868–1871	Succeeded by Augustus Weismann
U.S. House of Representatives
Preceded by Smith Ely Jr.	Member of the U.S. House of Representatives from New York's 7th congressional district 1873-1875	Succeeded by Smith Ely Jr.
Preceded by Daniel J. Riordan	Member of the U.S. House of Representatives from New York's 8th congressional district 1901-1903	Succeeded by Timothy Sullivan
