= Ruffle Bar =

Island in Jamaica Bay, Brooklyn, New York

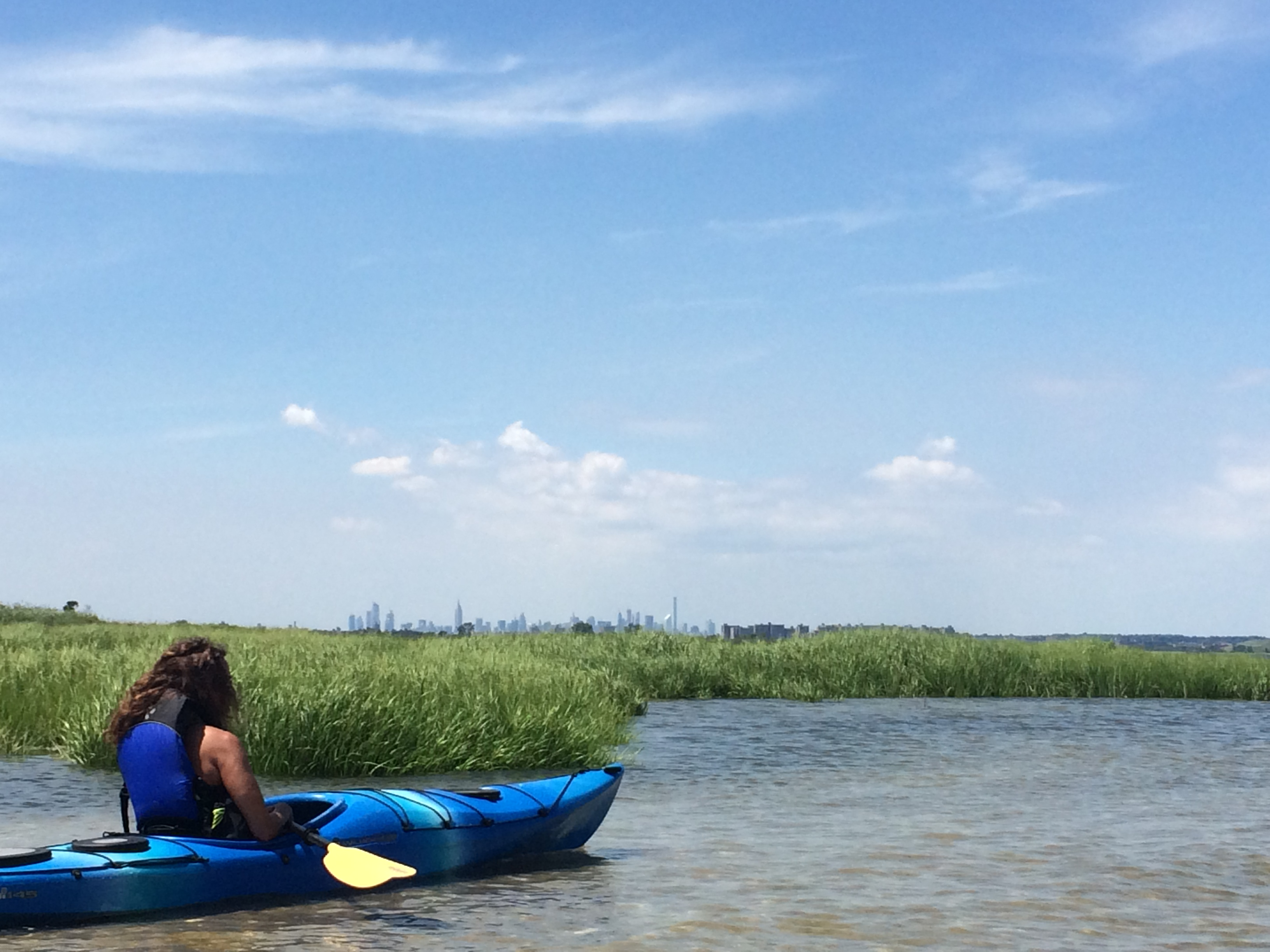
- A kayaker rests during an excursion to Ruffle Bar led by the National Park Service

- Location within New York City

Geography
- Location: Jamaica Bay, Brooklyn, New York City, USA
- Coordinates: 40.599519°N 73.857715°W
- Area: 143 acres (58 ha)

Administration
- United States

Demographics
- Population: 0 (1950)

Additional information
- Time zone: EST (UTC-5:00)
  - Summer (DST): Eastern Daylight Time (UTC-4:00)

Ruffle Bar is a 143-acre (58 ha) island located in Jamaica Bay in the borough of Brooklyn in New York City, off the coast of Canarsie. The island is part of the Jamaica Bay Wildlife Refuge, and lies just east of the former Barren Island, where Floyd Bennett Field is now located.

== History ==
One of the early inhabitants of Ruffle Bar was Jacob Skidmore, who built a house on the island. In 1842, Skidmore moved his house and family to Barren Island. Skidmore had disassembled his house piece-by-piece. According to one story, a storm blew his disassembled ceiling across the bay to Barren Island.

During the Civil War, Ruffle Bar became a stop for ferries traveling between Canarsie and Rockaway. The Windward Club started sponsoring boat racing around Ruffle Bar in the 1880s. By the next decade, a hotel on the island had opened. Ruffle Bar was considered to be part of the public land of the town of Flatbush until the 1890s, when parts of the island were sold to 24 private owners.

Ruffle Bar was so isolated that when Jamaica Bay froze during the winter, the island's few residents were cut off from the rest of civilization for three months. One newspaper article compared the situation to isolated communities in the Arctic. Making reference to an Arctic explorer named Otto Sverdrup, the newspaper wrote, "For all that the city does for Ruffle Bar, it might as well be in Sverdrup Land."

In 1913, the city proposed to build a garbage incinerator on Ruffle Bar. Brooklyn residents strongly opposed building an incinerator at this location because the smell could drift northward into Flatlands, so the incinerator was ultimately not constructed on Ruffle Bar. Pierre Noel's Ruffle Bar Association began constructing structures on Ruffle Bar in 1914, for the purpose of developing it as a resort. The association leased the city-owned portions of Ruffle Bar from the New York City Department of Docks for ten years starting in 1914. Through the 1920s, landfill was added in order to expand Ruffle Bar's area. The island became the center of a successful clam and oyster industry. At one point, there were more than 40 structures on the island that supported the industry, with most of these buildings being located on the south shore.

Fishing activities ceased when the water was deemed by the New York City Department of Health to be too polluted for the breeding of shellfish. The Great Depression caused most of the residents to move elsewhere, but a few squatters remained. By 1940, there were twenty-five structures left on the island. The last resident, a fisherman, was thought to have moved away in 1944. However, The New York Times showed that Census Enumerators visited Ruffle Bar as late as 1950 to collect Census data from the remaining residents. The island is uninhabited and, along with other islands in Jamaica Bay, has been designated as a bird sanctuary. Due to its remoteness, kayakers have sometimes become stranded on the island.
