= George F. Langbein =

American politician and lawyer (1842–1911)

Member of the New York Senate from the 7th district
- In office 1888–1889
- Preceded by: James Daly
- Succeeded by: George F. Roesch

Member of the New York State Assembly from the New York County, 10th district
- In office 1887–1887
- Preceded by: Charles A. Binder
- Succeeded by: George F. Roesch

Personal details
- Born: June 29, 1842 Hirschhorn am Neckar, Grand Duchy of Hesse
- Died: May 27, 1911 (aged 68) Howells, Orange County, New York, U.S.
- Party: Democratic
- Children: George F. Langbein Jr. (son)
- Occupation: Lawyer, politician

George Frederick Langbein (June 29, 1842 – May 27, 1911) was an American lawyer and politician from New York. He served in the New York State Assembly in 1887 and in the New York State Senate from 1888 to 1889.

== Early life and education ==
Langbein was born on June 29, 1842, in Hirschhorn am Neckar, in the Grand Duchy of Hesse. The family emigrated to the United States in 1846 and settled in New York City.

He graduated from Grammar School No. 19 in 1855. He then studied law, was admitted to the bar in 1863, and practiced in New York City in partnership with his brother, Assemblyman J. C. Julius Langbein (1846–1910).

== Political career ==
Langbein was a member of the New York State Assembly (New York County, 10th District) in 1887.

He was a member of the New York State Senate (7th District) in 1888 and 1889.

== Personal life and death ==
On January 23, 1886, his 21-year-old son George F. Langbein Jr. shot himself dead. The authorities believed it was suicide, while the parents believed it was an accident.

Langbein died on May 27, 1911, at his home in Howells, Orange County, New York. He was 68 years old.

New York State Assembly
Preceded by Charles A. Binder	New York State Assembly; New York County, 10th District; 1887	Succeeded by George F. Roesch
New York State Senate
Preceded by James Daly	New York State Senate; 7th District; 1888–1889	Succeeded by George F. Roesch
