= Charles A. Binder =

American politician (1857–1891)

Charles A. Binder (November 2, 1857 New York City – May 16, 1891 Elizabeth, New Jersey) was an American lawyer and politician from New York. He killed himself by shooting two bullets in his own head. Binder had misappropriated about $20,000 from an estate of which he was a co-executor, and he feared being arrested.

== Life ==
He attended Public Schools No. 20 and 40, and Heidenfield's Private Academy. He graduated from Columbia Law School in 1877, was admitted to the bar in 1878, and practiced in New York City.

He was a member of the New York State Assembly (New York Co., 10th D.) in 1884 and 1886.

He killed himself on May 16, 1891, at the Sheridan House, located on the corner of Broad Street and Rahway Avenue, in Elizabeth, New Jersey, by shooting two bullets in his head. Binder had misappropriated about $20,000 from an estate of which he was co-executor, and feared being arrested.

== Sources ==
- The New York Red Book compiled by Edgar L. Murlin (published by James B. Lyon, Albany NY, 1897; pg. 503 and 505)
- First Annual Record of Assemblymen and Senators from the City of New York in the State Legislature published by the City Reform Club (1886; pg. 30f)
- Biographical sketches of the members of the Legislature in The Evening Journal Almanac (1886)
- A DEFAULTER'S SUICIDE in NYT on May 18, 1891

New York State Assembly
Preceded by George F. Roesch	New York State Assembly; New York County, 10th District; 1884	Succeeded by George F. Roesch
Preceded by George F. Roesch	New York State Assembly; New York County, 10th District; 1886	Succeeded by George F. Langbein
