= P. Henry Dugro =

American politician (1855–1920)

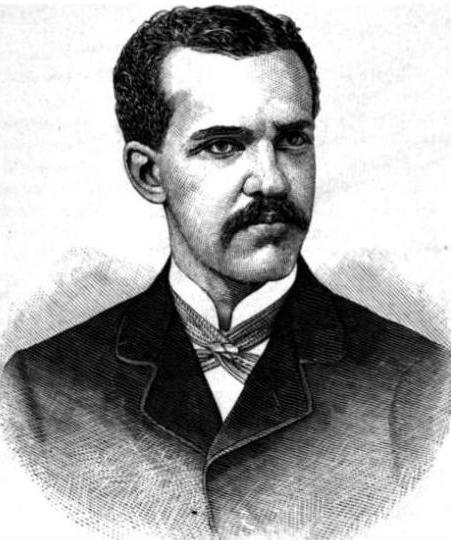

Associate Justice of the New York Supreme Court
- In office 1896–1920

Judge of the Superior Court of New York County
- In office 1887–1896

Member of the U.S. House of Representatives from New York's 7th district
- In office March 4, 1881 – March 3, 1883
- Preceded by: Edwin Einstein
- Succeeded by: William Dorsheimer

New York State Assembly (New York Co., 14th D.)
- In office 1879

Personal details
- Born: October 3, 1855 New York City, New York
- Died: March 1, 1920 (aged 64) New York City, New York
- Resting place: Woodlawn Cemetery, Bronx, New York
- Party: Democratic
- Education: Columbia College

Philip Henry Dugro (October 3, 1855 – March 1, 1920) was an American lawyer, judge, and U.S. Representative from New York, serving from 1881 to 1883. He is best known for a 1909 ruling in which he argued that the reputations of African Americans had less legal value than those of whites.

== Biography ==
Born in New York City, Dugro attended the public schools and was graduated from the school of arts of Columbia College, New York City, in 1876 and from the law department of the same institution in 1878. He was admitted to the bar in the latter year and commenced practice in New York City.

=== State legislature ===
He was a member of the New York State Assembly (New York Co., 14th D.) in 1879.

=== Congress and judicial office ===
Dugro was elected as a Democrat to the Forty-seventh Congress (March 4, 1881 – March 3, 1883). He was not a candidate for reelection.

He resumed the practice of law in New York City and also entered the real estate business. He declined the office of state commissioner of immigration in 1885. He served as judge of the Superior Court of New York County from 1887 to 1896, when the Superior Court was merged with and into the state Supreme Court. He was elected to the New York Supreme Court in 1896.

== Racist ruling in Griffin v. Brady ==
In 1909, Dugro gained national attention for his decision in a case involving George W. Griffin, an African-American Pullman porter. On a train headed to Montreal, a railroad executive named Daniel N. Brady (a brother of Diamond Jim Brady) accused Griffin of stealing his wallet. Griffin was pulled off the train and detained for hours before being released for lack of evidence.

Griffin then sued Brady in Dugro's New York court for false arrest and imprisonment. A jury found in Griffin's favor and awarded him $2,500 in damages (equivalent to $89,583 in 2025). Dugro said that the amount was excessive and ordered it reduced to $300 because of Griffin's race — that a black man's reputation was not as harmed by a false accusation as a white man's:

He would not be hurt just as much if put in prison as every other man would be. That depends on a man's standing, what his circumstances are, and if he is a colored man, the fact that he is a colored man is to be considered. You cannot say he is just the same as a white man when you come to say how much shame he will suffer. Is it likely that when a colored man is arrested and imprisoned he feels just as much shame as a white man might? In this sort of community, I dare say the amount of evil that would flow to the colored man from a charge like this would not be as great as it probably would be to a white man.

The ruling spurred outrage among African Americans nationwide, who called it "perhaps the most infamous opinion in a Northern court of law during the present generation" and Dugro a "20th century Judge Taney," after Roger Taney, author of the notorious Dred Scott decision.

Griffin appealed the ruling three times, seeking restoration of the $2,500 judgment, but he was denied each time; however, the final appeal, in an opinion written by Edward Everett McCall, resulted in the damages being raised to $1,000. Two later legal scholars called the case "perhaps the most celebrated instance of racial devaluation in early-20th-century tort litigation." The writer and activist James Weldon Johnson wrote of Dugro:

He has been on the bench for a great many years. He is, without doubt, learned in the law and versed in judiciary proceedings; but I, as a Negro, would vote for a candidate who didn't know the difference between a law book and a telephone directory before I would vote for any man holding such opinions as those expressed by Judge Dugro.

== Death ==
Dugro remained on the New York Supreme Court bench until his death in New York City on March 1, 1920. He was interred in Woodlawn Cemetery.

U.S. House of Representatives
Preceded by Edwin Einstein	Member of the U.S. House of Representatives from New York's 7th congressional district 1881 - 1883	Succeeded by William Dorsheimer
