= Edwin Einstein =

American politician (1842–1905)

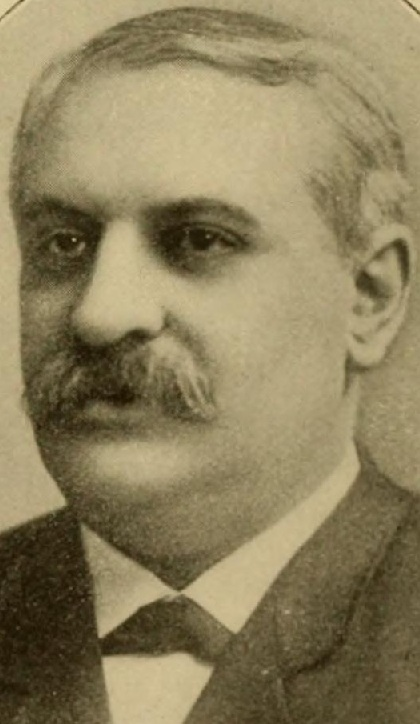

Member of the U.S. House of Representatives from New York's 7th district
- In office March 4, 1879 – March 3, 1881
- Preceded by: Anthony Eickhoff
- Succeeded by: P. Henry Dugro

Personal details
- Born: November 18, 1842 Cincinnati, Ohio, US
- Died: January 24, 1905 (aged 62) New York City, US
- Party: Republican
- Spouse: Fanny Hendricks Einstein
- Education: College of the City of New York
- Profession: Merchant, banker; politician

Edwin Einstein (November 18, 1842 – January 24, 1905) was an American politician and a U.S. Representative from New York.

== Biography ==
Born in Cincinnati, Ohio, Einstein was son of Lamle 'Lewis' and Judith Einstein. He moved with his parents to New York City in 1846, worked as clerk in a store, and received a collegiate training in the College of the City of New York. He entered Union College, but did not graduate, and continued in mercantile pursuits. He married Fanny Hendricks. He went into a partnership with Louis Hirschhorn founding a cigar manufacturing business named Hirschhorn & Einstein.

== Career ==
Einstein was elected as a Republican to the Forty-sixth Congress, and served from March 4, 1879, to March 3, 1881. Not a candidate for renomination in 1880, he was an unsuccessful Republican candidate for mayor of New York City in 1892.

President of New River Mineral Company, Einstein was also director of Alabama Mineral Land Company, director of Raritan Woolen Mills, and trustee of Texas Pacific Land Trust. He was also Dock Commissioner of New York City in 1895.

== Death ==
Einstein died of heart trouble, in Manhattan, New York County, New York, on January 24, 1905 (age 62 years, 67 days). He is interred at Beth Olom Cemetery, Glendale, Queens, New York.

== See also ==
- List of Jewish members of the United States Congress

U.S. House of Representatives
Preceded by Anthony Eickhoff	Member of the U.S. House of Representatives from New York's 7th congressional district 1879 - 1881	Succeeded by P. Henry Dugro
