= Abraham Lent (New York politician) =

American politician (1815–1882)

Abraham Lent (February 12, 1815 New York City – November 23, 1882) was an American politician from New York.

== Life ==
He was the son of Peter Waldron Lent (born 1786) and Catherine S. (Forbes) Lent. He studied law for a time, but abandoned this, and became a merchant instead. On July 11, 1836, he married Susan Cooper (1816–1881), and they had two children. In 1850, he became a partner in a clothing manufacturing company.

He was a member of the Board of Councilmen (6th D.) in 1859, 1860, 1861, 1862 and 1865.

He was a member of the New York State Senate (6th D.) in 1866 and 1867.

== Sources ==
- The New York Civil List compiled by Franklin Benjamin Hough, Stephen C. Hutchins and Edgar Albert Werner (1870; pg. 444)
- Life Sketches of the State Officers, Senators, and Members of the Assembly of the State of New York, in 1867 by S. R. Harlow & H. H. Boone (pg. 112ff)
- History of the Lent (van Lent) Family in the United States, Genealogical and Biographical by Nelson Burt Lent (1903)
- Manual of the Corporation of the City of New York by D. T. Valentine (1865; pg. 479)
- OBITUARY; ABRAHAM LENT in NYT on November 24, 1882

New York State Senate
| Preceded by William Laimbeer Jr. | New York State Senate; 6th District; 1866–1867 | Succeeded by Thomas J. Creamer |
