= Luke F. Cozans =

American politician

Luke F. Cozans (March 15, 1836 in Prince Edward Island, Canada – April 7, 1903 in Manhattan, New York City) was an American lawyer and politician from New York.

== Life ==
He was the son of John Cozans and Mary (Comerford) Cozans (c.1796–1860). The family removed to New York City in 1839. He studied law with Ogden Hoffman, was admitted to the bar in 1857, and practiced in New York City.

He was a member of the New York State Assembly (New York Co., 10th D.) in 1861; of the New York State Senate (5th D.) in 1864 and 1865; and again of the State Assembly (14th D.) in 1877. He was the Democratic candidate for Speaker in 1877, but was defeated by Republican George B. Sloan.

He died of "kidney trouble" at his home at 2016 Fifth Avenue, in Manhattan, and was buried in White Plains.

== Sources ==
- The New York Civil List compiled by Franklin Benjamin Hough, Stephen C. Hutchins and Edgar Albert Werner (1870; pg. 443 and 494)
- Biographical Sketches of the State Officers and Members of the Legislature of the State of New York in 1861 by William D. Murphy (pg. 179f)
- The Legislature in The Madison Observer on January 10, 1877
- DEATH LIST OF A DAY; Luke F. Cozans in NYT on April 8, 1903

New York State Assembly
Preceded by Joseph P. Cooper	New York State Assembly; New York County, 10th District; 1861	Succeeded by Daniel M. O'Brien
Preceded by Patrick J. Carty	New York State Assembly; New York County, 14th District; 1877	Succeeded by James Daly
New York State Senate
Preceded by Charles G. Cornell	New York State Senate; 5th District; 1864–1865	Succeeded by Charles G. Cornell
