= Smith Ely Jr. =

American politician (1825–1911)

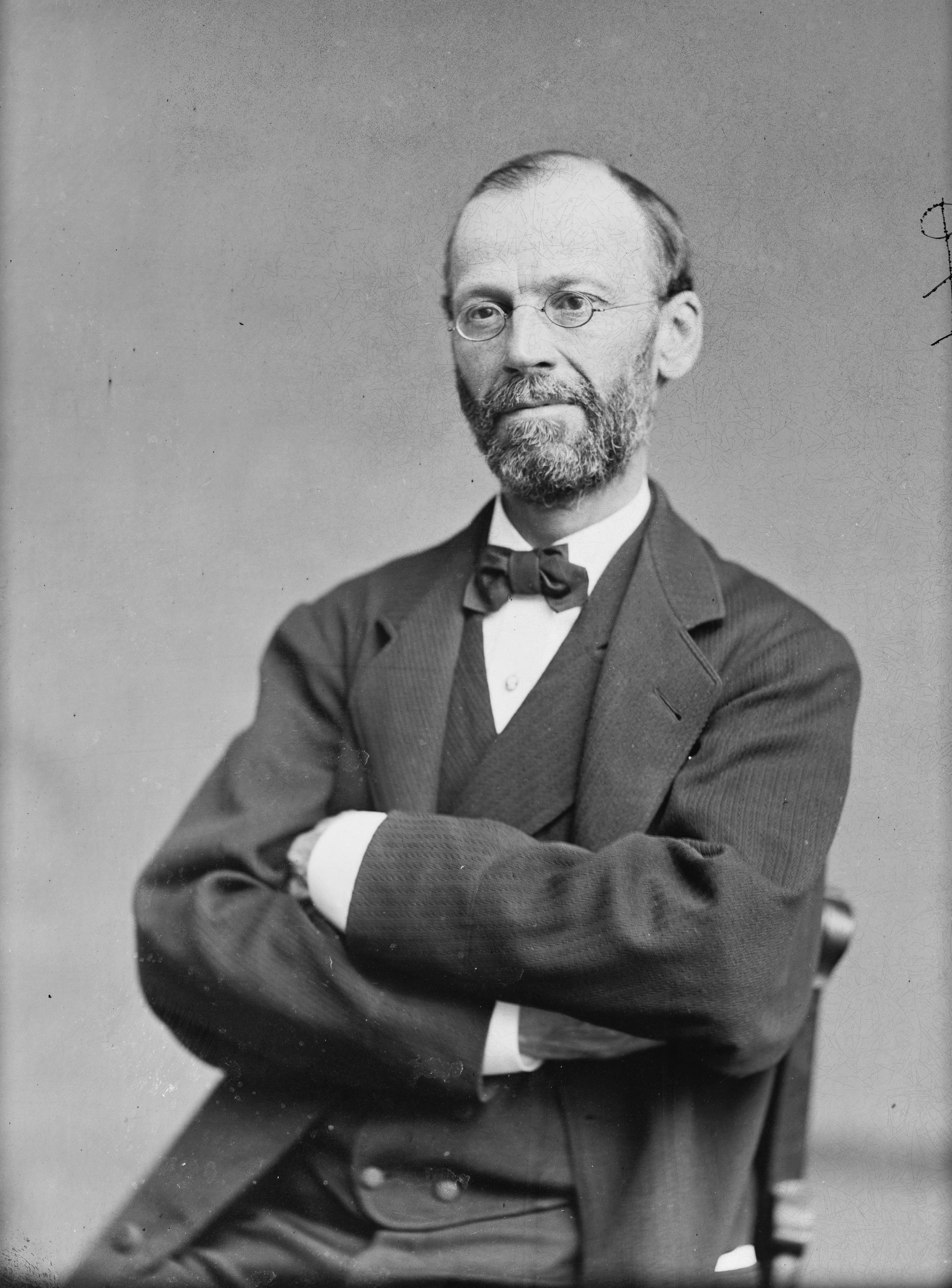

83rd Mayor of New York City
- In office 1877–1878
- Preceded by: William H. Wickham
- Succeeded by: Edward Cooper

Member of the U.S. House of Representatives from New York's 7th district
- In office March 4, 1875 – December 11, 1876
- Preceded by: Thomas J. Creamer
- Succeeded by: David Dudley Field II
- In office March 4, 1871 – March 3, 1873
- Preceded by: Hervey C. Calkin
- Succeeded by: Thomas J. Creamer

Member of the New York State Senate from the 5th District
- In office 1858–1859
- Preceded by: Mark Spencer
- Succeeded by: Bernard Kelly

Personal details
- Born: April 17, 1825 Hanover Township, New Jersey, US
- Died: July 1, 1911 (aged 86) Livingston, New Jersey, US
- Party: Democratic

Smith Ely Jr. (April 17, 1825 – July 1, 1911) was an American politician, the 83rd Mayor of New York City, and a member of the United States House of Representatives from New York in the 19th century.

== Early life ==
He was born in Hanover Township, New Jersey on April 17, 1825. His father, Smith Ely Sr., was a leather merchant who had been a soldier in the War of 1812 and his paternal grandfather was Moses Ely, who fought under George Washington in the American Revolutionary War. His maternal grandfather was Ambrose Kitchell. His siblings lived together in their adulthood, including elder brother, Ambrose Kitchell Ely, William Henry Ely and his wife, Maria Josephine Rogers, Edwin Augustus Ely, and Maria Louise Ely, who married George Burritt Vanderpoel.

He completed preparatory studies and was graduated from the University of the City of New York (now New York University) and, in 1845, from New York University School of Law.

== Career ==
He studied in the law office of Frederic de Peyster, and was admitted to the bar in 1845, but never practiced law. Instead, he engaged in mercantile pursuits in New York with Ely, Vanderpoel & Kitchell which was founded in 1868. Like his father, he was a leather merchant in the Swamp district until the Leather Trust bought him out and he retired to his farm in New Jersey.

=== Early political career ===
He was active in various public offices including, School Commissioner for the 17th Ward from 1856 until 1860; a New York State Senator from 1858 and 1859; the New York County Supervisor from 1860 to 1870; and the Commissioner of Public Instruction in 1867.

=== Congress ===
From March 4, 1871 until March 3, 1873 he served as a Democratic Representative to the Forty-second Congress. He was not a candidate for renomination in 1872, however he was again elected as a Representative to the Forty-fourth Congress serving from March 4, 1875, until the date of his resignation on December 11, 1876. While in Congress, he served as chairman of Committee on Expenditures in the Department of the Treasury. While in office, he gave a speech on July 29, 1876, regarding the method of manufacturing the circulating notes and securities of the Government.

=== New York City mayor ===
Following his resignation from Congress, Ely served as the Mayor of New York City from 1877 to 1878, beating former New York Governor Gen. John Adams Dix by 55,000 votes. In 1895, he was appointed commissioner of parks and served until 1897, when he retired from public life.

== Death and burial ==
Ely, who never married, died at the age of 86 on July 1, 1911, in Livingston, Essex County, New Jersey. He was interred in a private cemetery called "Ely Cemetery" on his farm in Livingston.

== Legacy ==
His estate, valued in excess of $1,000,000, was almost entirely left to charity, including $50,000 to a fund for juveniles to "help offending youths get a better start in the world," $100,000 to the American Sunday School, $100,000 to United Charities, as well as funds to Orange and Morristown Memorial Hospitals. His bequests were in addition to the millions he gave away to charities during his lifetime. His siblings also gave generously to charity upon their deaths.

Ely Avenue in the Bronx is named in honor of Ely.

New York State Senate
Preceded by Mark Spencer	New York State Senate; 5th District; 1858–1859	Succeeded by Bernard Kelly
U.S. House of Representatives
Preceded by Hervey C. Calkin	Member of the U.S. House of Representatives from New York's 7th congressional district 1871–1873	Succeeded by Thomas J. Creamer
Preceded by Thomas J. Creamer	Member of the U.S. House of Representatives from New York's 7th congressional district 1875—1876	Succeeded by David Dudley Field II
Political offices
Preceded by William H. Wickham	Mayor of New York City; 1877–1878	Succeeded by Edward Cooper
