= Eugene de Salignac =

Eugene de Salignac (1861–1943) was an American photographer who worked for the Department of Bridges/Plant and Structures in New York City.

Born in Boston in 1861 into an eccentric family of exiled French nobility, de Salignac had no formal training in photography. In 1903, at the age of 42, his brother-in-law found him a job as an assistant to the photographer for the Department of Bridges, Joseph Palmer. After 3 years of apprenticeship, Palmer suddenly died, and in October 1906, de Salignac assumed his duties.

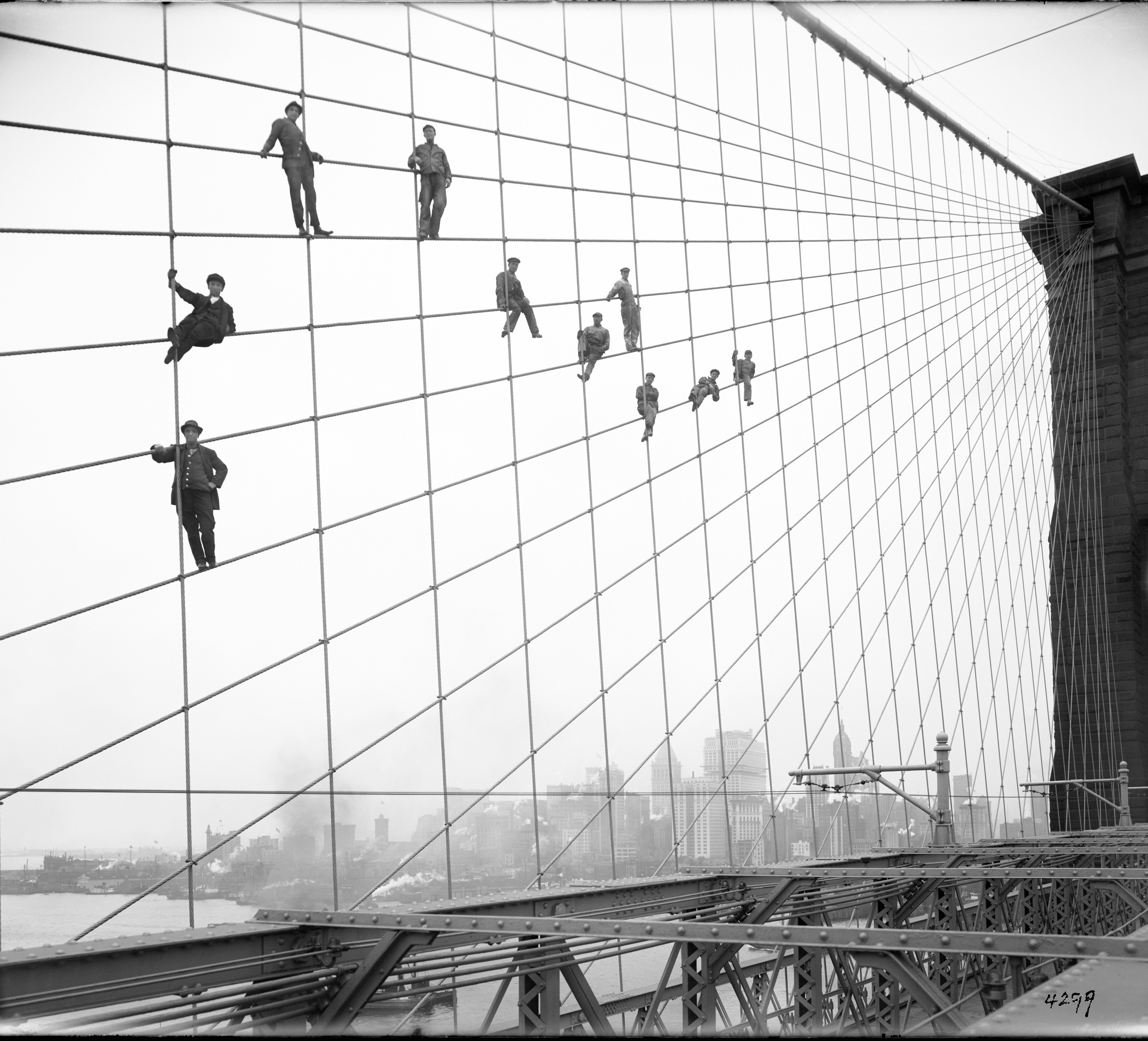
De Salignac's iconic print: "Brooklyn Bridge showing painters on suspenders"

As the sole photographer for the department from 1906 to 1934 (in 1916 it changed its name to the Department of Plant & Structures), he documented the creation of the city's modern infrastructure—including bridges, major municipal buildings, roads and subways. Most notably, he documented the construction of the Manhattan Bridge and the Queensboro Bridge, and the Manhattan Municipal Building but his most famous image is that of painters posing nonchalantly on the cables of the Brooklyn Bridge. Using a large-format camera and 8x10 inch glass-plate negatives, he shot over 20,000 images in his career. Most of these negatives and over 15,000 vintage prints are held by the New York City Municipal Archives. Into his 70s de Salignac was still climbing bridges and actively working, but he was forced to retire in 1934 despite a petition to Mayor La Guardia.

In his lifetime de Salignac's work was little seen outside of New York City government, and his name was forgotten after his death in 1943. His images were rediscovered in the 1980s, but it was not until 1999 that an archivist realized the collection was mostly the work of one man. In 2007, Aperture published New York Rises, the first monograph of his work, which became a traveling exhibition that opened at the Museum of the City of New York. Since then, his photographs have been widely reproduced and are part of a growing interest in industrial photography that has been left out of the traditional photography canon.
