= Joseph Koch =

American lawyer and politician (1843–1902)

Joseph Koch (September 28, 1843 – August 28, 1902) was a Jewish-American lawyer, judge, and politician from New York.

== Life ==
Koch was born on September 28, 1843, in New York City, New York, the son of German immigrants Samuel Koch and Theresa Engelhard.

Koch graduated from the College of the City of New York in 1862. During the American Civil War, he served in the Judge Advocate General's Department of the Army with the rank of major from August 1862 until his honorable discharge in May 1863. He then worked as an assistant teacher at Grammar School No. 36 in New York City, attended law lectures with Professor Theodore William Dwight at Columbia University, and studied law with Richard H. Huntley and Abram J. Dittenhoefer. He graduated from Columbia Law School with an LL.B. in 1865. He was admitted to the bar later that year, after which he sailed to Europe and spent a year at Heidelberg University. He returned to New York City in 1867 and began practicing law there. He was offered the Democratic nomination for the New York State Assembly that year. He declined, and was instead appointed Law Clerk of the New York Supreme Court, followed by Deputy County Clerk under County Clerk Charles E. Loew.

Koch retired as Deputy County Clerk in 1869, when he was elected Civil Justice in the Fifth District. In 1877, he was nominated by anti-Tammany organizations for Justice of the Marine Court, losing the election by a small majority and allegedly due to fraud. In 1879, he ran for the New York State Assembly as a Democrat in New York County's 21st District. He lost the election to Republican Edward Mitchell. He served as trustee of the common schools from 1870 to 1874. In 1881, he was elected to the New York State Senate, representing New York's 10th State Senate district (the 12th, 19th, 20th, 21st, and 22nd wards of New York City). He served in the Senate in 1882 and 1883. He was elected as a Democrat, even though the district was strongly Republican. An active member of Senate, he was chairman of important senate committees. In 1883, he called attention to the devastation of the Adirondack Forest and wrote an elaborate report on the subject. He returned to his private law practice after his senate term ended. According to The Jewish Encyclopedia, he was the first Jewish state senator in New York.

In 1884, Mayor William Russell Grace appointed him a Dock Commissioner. He was then elected Chairman of the Commission. In 1889, Mayor Hugh J. Grant appointed him an Excise Commissioner. In 1892, Grant reappointed him Excise Commissioner and he became president of the Excise Board. In 1893, Mayor Thomas Francis Gilroy appointed him Police Justice to succeed James T. Kilbreth, whose term as Police Justice expired. He was a school trustee for the 19th Ward from 1877 to 1882 and a delegate to the 1894 New York State Constitutional Convention.

An active member of B'nai B'rith, Koch was president of the District Grand Lodge No. 1 and chairman of the 1874 national convention in Chicago. He was also an active member of the Freemasons, serving as grand marshal and grand steward as well as a commissioner of appeals of the Grand Lodge of New York in 1874. He was a captain in the 71st New York Infantry Regiment as well as Major and Judge Advocate of the Second Brigade in the New York National Guard. He was also a member of the Harmonie-Liederkranz, the Arion Society, the Manhattan Club, the Democratic Club, and the Lotos Club. In 1874, he married Hennie Bendit. Their children were Spencer B. and Roland J.

Koch died in Mount Sinai Hospital from a long illness on August 28, 1902.

New York State Senate
Preceded by William Waldorf Astor	New York State Senate; 10th District; 1882–1883	Succeeded by J. Hampden Robb
