= William J. Brennan Award =

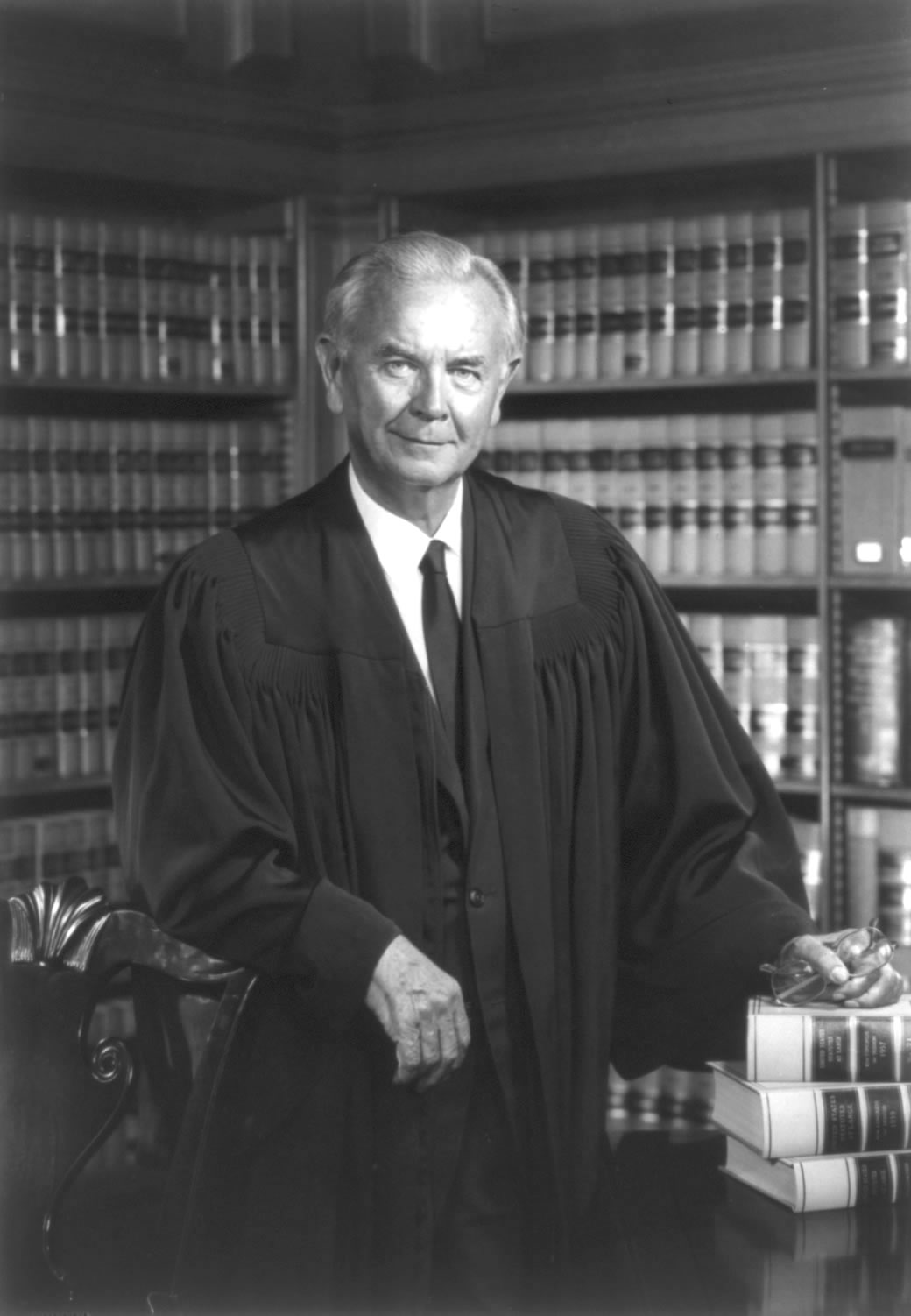
William J. Brennan, Jr.

William J. Brennan, Jr., who authored the opinion in New York Times Co. v. Sullivan, has several awards named in his honor, which are presented to individuals for dedication to public interest and free expression. Awards named after William J. Brennan, Jr. are presented by the following organizations.

== Thomas Jefferson Center for the Protection of Free Expression ==
The William J. Brennan, Jr. Award honors the legacy of U. S. Supreme Court Justice Brennan's extraordinary devotion to the principles of free expression. The award recognizes an individual or group whose commitment to free expression is consistent with Justice Brennan's abiding devotion. Such commitment might be shown by a single act or through a lifetime of activity to enhance the liberties of free speech and press.

The award is given not more than once a year or less than once in five years. Honorees receive $5000.00 at a ceremony held in Washington, D.C. and have their name inscribed on a plaque on display in Justice Brennan's chambers in the United States Supreme Court. Nominees from all professions and backgrounds are considered and nominations from the general public are invited.

Recipients:

- 1993: Anthony P. Griffin
- 1996: Joyce Meskis
- 2001: Sean A. Fanelli
- 2004: David D. Cole
- 2009: Judith Krug

== District of Columbia Bar ==
The honor is presented biannually to a DC Bar member in recognition of "outstanding work toward furthering the public interest and equal justice."

Recipients:

- 1992–93: Elaine R. Jones
- 1993–94: Marcia D. Greenberger and Nancy Duff Campbell
- 1994–95: Alan B. Morrison
- 1995–96: Hon. William B. Bryant
- 1996–97: Antonia Hernández
- 1997–98: John H. Pickering
- 1998–99: Hon. John M. Ferren
- 1999–00: James M. Nabrit III
- 2000–01: Charles T. Duncan
- 2001–02: Wade J. Henderson
- 2002–03: Hon. Ruth Bader Ginsburg
- 2004–05: Peter B. Edelman
- 2006–07: James W. Klein
- 2008–09: Patricia "Patty" Mullahy Fugere
- 2010–11: Maureen Thornton Syracuse
- 2012–13: Walter A. Smith Jr.
- 2014–15: James J. Sandman
- 2016–17: Jonathan M. Smith
- 2018–19: Michele Zavos
- 2020–21: David Reiser
- 2022–23: Jon S. Bouker

== International Commission of Jurists ==
The Brennan Award, made possible by a generous grant from the Paul D. Schurgot Foundation, is presented to a non-American lawyer or judge who has made a notable contribution toward establishing or defending human rights and the rule of law.

- 2006: Bertrand Ramcharan

== Association of the Federal Bar of the State of New Jersey ==
William J. Brennan, Jr., Award. The Award, which is given annually by the Association of the Federal Bar of the State of New Jersey, honors those whose actions have advanced the principles of free expression. Judge Becker spent many years as a member of the ALI-ABA Committee and is a member of the Institute's Special Committee on Federal Judicial Code Revision.

Recipients:

- 1977 – Hon. Joseph Weintraub, Chief Justice of the New Jersey Supreme Court
- 1978 – Hon. Worrall F. Mountain, Associate Justice of the New Jersey Supreme Court
- 1979 – Hon. Richard J. Hughes, Governor of New Jersey and Chief Justice of the New Jersey Supreme Court
- 1979 – Clifford P. Case, United States Senator
- 1980 – Hon. William H. Webster, Director of the Federal Bureau of Investigation; Former Judge of the United States Court of Appeals for the Eighth Circuit
- 1981 – Hon. Albert B. Maris, Judge of the United States Court of Appeals for the Third Circuit
- 1982 – Hon. Nicolas deB. Katzenbach, Attorney General of the United States
- 1983 – Hon. Robert N. Wilentz, Chief Justice of the New Jersey Supreme Court
- 1984 – Hon. Morris Pashman, Associate Justice of the New Jersey Supreme Court
- 1985 – Hon. Collins J. Seitz, Chief Judge of the United States Court of Appeals for the Third Circuit
- 1986 – Hon. Frederick B. Lacey, United States Attorney and Judge of the United States District Court for the District of New Jersey
- 1987 – Hon. Herbert J. Stern, United States Attorney and Judge of the United States District Court for the District of New Jersey
- 1988 – Hon. Mitchell H. Cohen, Senior Judge of the United States District Court for the District of New Jersey
- 1988 – Hon. Leonard I. Garth, Senior Judge of the United States Court of Appeals for the Third Circuit
- 1988 – Hon. James Hunter, III, Senior Judge of the United States Court of Appeals for the Third Circuit
- 1989 – Hon. Clarkson S. Fisher, Senior Judge of the United States District Court for the District of New Jersey
- 1989 – William J. Brennan, III, Esq.
- 1990 – Hon. John J. Gibbons, Chief Judge of the United States Court of Appeals for the Third Circuit
- 1991 – Hon. John F. Gerry, Chief Judge of the United States District Court for the District of New Jersey
- 1992 – Thomas F. Campion, Esq.
- 1993 – Hon. A. Leon Higginbotham, Former Chief Judge of the United States Court of Appeals for the Third Circuit
- 1994 – Hon. David H. Souter, Associate Justice of the United States Supreme Court
- 1995 – Hon. Harold A. Ackerman, Senior Judge of the United States District Court for the District of New Jersey
- 1995 – Hon. Stanley S. Brotman, Senior Judge of the United States District Court for the District of New Jersey
- 1995 – Hon. Dickinson R. Debevoise, Senior Judge of the United States District Court for the District of New Jersey
- 1996 – Hon. Robert L. Clifford, Retired Associate Justice of the New Jersey Supreme Court
- 1997 – Hon. Sidney M. Schreiber, Retired Associate Justice of the New Jersey Supreme Court
- 1997 – William B. McGuire, Esq.
- 1998 – Rev. Daniel A. Degnan, S.J., Former Dean of the Seton Hall University School of Law
- 1998 – Hon. Herman D. Michels, Retired New Jersey Superior Court Judge
- 1999 – Hon. Robert E. Cowen, Judge of the United States Court of Appeals for the Third Circuit
- 1999 – Hon. Joseph H. Rodriguez, Judge of the United States District Court for the District of New Jersey
- 2000 – Hon. Maryanne Trump Barry, Judge of the United States Court of Appeals for the Third Circuit
- 2000 – John J. Barry, Esq.
- 2001 – Hon. Anne E. Thompson, Senior Judge of the United States District Court for the District of New Jersey
- 2001 – Hon. Morton I. Greenberg, Senior Judge of the United States Court of Appeals for the Third Circuit
- 2001 – Hon. Alfred M. Wolin, Senior Judge of the United States District Court for the District of New Jersey
- 2002 – Hon. John C. Lifland, Senior Judge of the United States District Court for the District of New Jersey
- 2002 – Hon. Nicholas H. Politan, Retired Judge of the United States District Court for the District of New Jersey
- 2002 – Raymond A. Brown, Esq.
- 2003 – Donald A. Robinson, Esq.
- 2003 – Justin P. Walder, Esq.
- 2004 – Hon. Edward R. Becker, Senior Judge of the United States Court of Appeals for the Third Circuit
- 2004 – Frederic K. Becker, Esq.
- 2005 – Hon. John W. Bissell, Chief Judge of the United States District Court for the District of New Jersey
- 2005 – Hon. Joseph E. Irenas, Senior Judge of the United States District Court for the District of New Jersey
- 2006 – Hon. William G. Bassler, United States District Court for the District of New Jersey
- 2006 – Hon. William H. Walls, United States District Court for the District of New Jersey
- 2007 – Hon. Marie L. Garibaldi, Retired Justice of the New Jersey Supreme Court
- 2007 – Hon. Daniel J. O’Hern, Retired Justice of the New Jersey Supreme Court
- 2008 – Hon. James R. Zazzali, Retired Chief Justice of the New Jersey Supreme Court
- 2008 – Jonathan L. Goldstein, Esq.
- 2009 – Hon. John J. Hughes, Retired Magistrate Judge for the District Court for the District of New Jersey
- 2009 – Bruce I. Goldstein, Esq.
- 2010 – Hon. Garrett E. Brown, Jr., Chief Judge of the United States District Court for the District of New Jersey
- 2010 – Michael R. Griffinger, Esq.
- 2011 – Thomas R. Curtin, Esq.
- 2011 – Hon. Katharine S. Hayden, Senior Judge of the United States District Court for the District of New Jersey
- 2012 – John J. Farmer, Jr., Esq.
- 2012 – Carl D. Poplar, Esq.
- 2013 – Hon. Rosemary Gambardella, United States District Court for the District of New Jersey
- 2013 – Theodore V. Wells, Jr., Esq.
- 2014 – Hon. Dennis M. Cavanaugh, Retired Judge of the United States District Court for the District of New Jersey
- 2014 – Joseph A. Hayden, Jr., Esq.
- 2015 – Hon. Joseph A. Greenaway, Jr., Judge of the United States Court of Appeals for the Third Circuit
- 2015 – Lawrence S. Lustberg, Esq.
- 2016 – Hon. Jerome B. Simandle, Chief Judge of the United States District Court for the District of New Jersey
- 2016 – Hon. Stuart Rabner, Chief Justice of the Supreme Court of New Jersey
- 2017 – Hon. Paul J. Fishman, United States Attorney for the District of New Jersey
- 2018 – Hon. Michael A. Chagares, Judge of the United States Court of Appeals for the Third Circuit
- 2019 – Hon. Stanley R. Chesler, United States District Judge for the District of New Jersey
- 2019 – Joseph P. LaSala, Esq.
- 2021 – Hon. Patty Shwartz, United States Court of Appeals for the Third Circuit
- 2022 – Peter C. Harvey, Esq.
- 2022 – Hon. John Michael Vazquez, United States District Court for the District of New Jersey
- 2023 – Hon. Esther Salas, United States District Court for the District of New Jersey

== National Trial Advocacy College at the University of Virginia School of Law ==
With Justice Brennan's agreement and participation, the National Trial Advocacy College at the University of Virginia School of Law established the William J. Brennan, Jr. Award in 1987. The Brennan Award honors Justice Brennan's unsurpassed contributions to the United States legal system and, in particular, to the enhancement of trial advocacy skills. The honorees--judges, public officials, and private practitioners--are selected on the basis of 1) their outstanding skills as trial lawyers and members of the judiciary, and 2) their outstanding contributions to advocacy education and to the legal profession. An engraved pewter bowl is given to each recipient.

These persons have received the Brennan Award:

- 1987: Judah Best, Hon. Robert R. Merhige, Jr., Hon. Herbert J. Stern
- 1988: Hon. Charles L. Becton, James D. St. Clair, Stephen A. Saltzburg
- 1989: William J. Brennan III, Terence F. MacCarthy
- 1990: John J. Curtin, Bruce I. Goldstein
- 1991: Hon. Frederic N. Smalkin, Gregory P. Joseph, Peter J. Kenny
- 1992: Thomas F. Campion, Stephen M. Duncan
- 1993: Hon. James T. Turner, John C. Lowe
- 1994: James M. Brown, Barry I. Fredericks, Charles B. Gorham
- 1995: Hon. Ralph Adam Fine, Colin J.S. Thomas, Jr.
- 1996: Raymond M. Tierney, Mary Lynn Tate, Edward R. Slaughter, Jr.
- 1997: Stephen B. Farmer, Hon. Norman K. Moon
- 1998: Hon. Stephen H. Helvin, Gerald A. Messerman
- 1999: Hon. Helen S. Balick, Hon. Bernard Balick, Robert M. Taylor
- 2000: Michael R. Fontham, Hon. B. Waugh Crigler
- 2001: Brian J. Donato, Arthur J. Schwab
- 2002: David Boies, Gerald F. Ivey
- 2003: James J. Brosnahan, Hon. David G. Lowe, Hon. Clifford R. Weckstein
- 2004: Hon. Antonin Scalia
- 2005: Hon. Peter Hill Beer, Hon. Adrian G. Duplantier
- 2006: Benjamin R. Civiletti, Peter J. Neufeld
- 2007: Hon. Leonie M. Brinkema, Robert A. Clifford, Jo-Ellan Dimitrius
- 2008: Hon. Barbara J. Rothstein, Theodore V. Wells, Jr., Kenneth R. Feinberg
- 2009: Hon. Mortimer M. Caplin, Hon. Julian Abele Cook, Jr.
- 2010: Otto F. Feil III, Kathy L. Nusslock
- 2011: Hon. Liam O'Grady
- 2012: Hon. Russell E. Carparelli, Hon. Ricardo M. Urbina
- 2013: Hon. Gerald B. Lee
- 2014: Hon. Bernice B. Donald
- 2015: Hon. Robert J. Conrad, Jr., Kenneth W. Curtis
- 2016: Hon. Henry Coke Morgan, R. Craig Wood
- 2017: Hon. Karen A. Henenberg, Brenda Rodriguez-Howdershell
- 2018: R. Hewitt Pate
- 2019: Hon. Paul F. Sheridan, Hon. Michael F. Urbanski, John T. Battaglia
- 2020: W. David Harless, Roscoe C. Howard, Jr., J. Brian Jackson
- 2023: Hon. Anthony J. Trenga, Sally Q. Yates

== See also ==
- William O. Douglas Prize
