= Judge McCarthy =

Judge McCarthy may refer to:

- James William McCarthy (1872–1939), judge of the United States District Court for the District of New Jersey
- William T. McCarthy (1885–1964), judge of the United States District Court for the District of Massachusetts
