= Noel Lawrence Hillman =

American judge (born 1956)

Senior Judge of the United States District Court for the District of New Jersey
- In office April 4, 2022 – February 29, 2024

Judge of the United States District Court for the District of New Jersey
- In office June 12, 2006 – April 4, 2022
- Appointed by: George W. Bush
- Preceded by: William G. Bassler
- Succeeded by: Michael E. Farbiarz

Personal details
- Born: December 22, 1956 (age 69) Red Bank, New Jersey, U.S.
- Education: Monmouth University (BA); Seton Hall University (JD); New York University (LLM)

Noel Lawrence Hillman (born December 22, 1956) is a former United States district judge of the United States District Court for the District of New Jersey.

== Education and career ==
Born in Red Bank, New Jersey, Hillman received a Bachelor of Arts degree from Monmouth University in 1981 and a Juris Doctor from Seton Hall University School of Law in 1985. He entered private practice in New Jersey in 1986, and was a law clerk for Judge Maryanne Trump Barry of the United States District Court for the District of New Jersey from 1986 to 1988, thereafter returning to private practice until 1992. He was an Assistant United States Attorney of the U.S. Attorney's Office, District of New Jersey from 1992 to 2001, and during this time he received a Master of Laws from the New York University School of Law in 1998. He was a Deputy Chief, Criminal Division, U.S. Attorney's Office, District of New Jersey from 2000 to 2001, then served in the Public Integrity Section, Criminal Division, U.S. Department of Justice, as principal deputy chief from 2001 to 2002, then as an acting chief from 2002 to 2003, and as chief from 2003 to 2006. In 2020, Hillman graduated from Duke Law School with a Master of Laws in judicial studies.

== Federal judicial service ==
On January 25, 2006, Hillman was nominated by President George W. Bush to a seat on the United States District Court for the District of New Jersey vacated by William G. Bassler. Hillman was confirmed by the United States Senate on June 8, 2006, and received his commission on June 12, 2006. He assumed senior status on April 4, 2022. He retired from active service on February 29, 2024. Since his retirement, he joined a law firm, Gibbons P.C.

== Sources ==
Legal offices
Preceded by William G. Bassler	Judge of the United States District Court for the District of New Jersey; 2006–2022	Succeeded by Michael E. Farbiarz
