= Susan D. Wigenton =

American judge (born 1962)

Susan Davis Wigenton

Judge of the United States District Court for the District of New Jersey
- Incumbent
- Assumed office June 12, 2006
- Appointed by: George W. Bush
- Preceded by: John Winslow Bissell

Magistrate Judge of the United States District Court for the District of New Jersey
- In office 2000 – June 12, 2006

Personal details
- Born: 1962 (age 63–64) Neptune Township, New Jersey, U.S.
- Education: Norfolk State University (BA); College of William & Mary (JD)

Susan Davis Wigenton (born 1962) is a United States district judge of the United States District Court for the District of New Jersey.

== Early life and education ==
Born in Neptune Township, New Jersey, Wigenton grew up with three brothers in a sports-oriented family headed by her pastor father. She graduated from Norfolk State University with her Bachelor of Arts degree in 1984 and later from The College of William & Mary Law School with a Juris Doctor in 1987.

== Career ==
Wigenton was a law clerk for Judge Lawrence Lawson of the New Jersey Superior Court from 1987 to 1988 before serving in private practice in the State of New Jersey from 1988 to 2000 at Giordano, Halleran & Ciesla, P.C., Middletown, New Jersey, where she was a Partner/Shareholder. She also served as the Public Defender for the City of Asbury Park, from 1989 until 1993

=== Federal judicial service ===
Wigenton was a United States magistrate judge of the United States District Court for the District of New Jersey from 2000 to 2006. She was nominated to be a United States district judge of the United States District Court for the District of New Jersey by President George W. Bush on January 25, 2006, to a seat vacated by Judge John Winslow Bissell, who retired from the bench. Wigenton was confirmed by the Senate on May 26, 2006, by a voice vote. She received her commission on June 12, 2006.

=== Notable cases ===
Wigenton presided over the trial of Andrew Auernheimer for alleged cybercrimes. The trial resulted in Auernheimer's conviction on two counts, but on April 11, 2014, the United States Court of Appeals for the Third Circuit reversed the conviction for improper venue under the Sixth Amendment, holding that the online conduct of Auernheimer, a resident of Arkansas, did not have a sufficient nexus to New Jersey, where the trial was held.

Wigenton was the presiding judge for the trial concerning the Fort Lee lane closure scandal known as Bridgegate.

== Personal life ==
Wigenton is married to Kevin Wigenton, an attorney in private practice in Red Bank, New Jersey.

== See also ==
- List of African-American federal judges
- List of African-American jurists
- List of people involved in the Fort Lee lane closure scandal

== Sources ==
Legal offices
Preceded by John Winslow Bissell	Judge of the United States District Court for the District of New Jersey; 2006–present	Incumbent
