= Karen M. Williams =

American judge (born 1963)

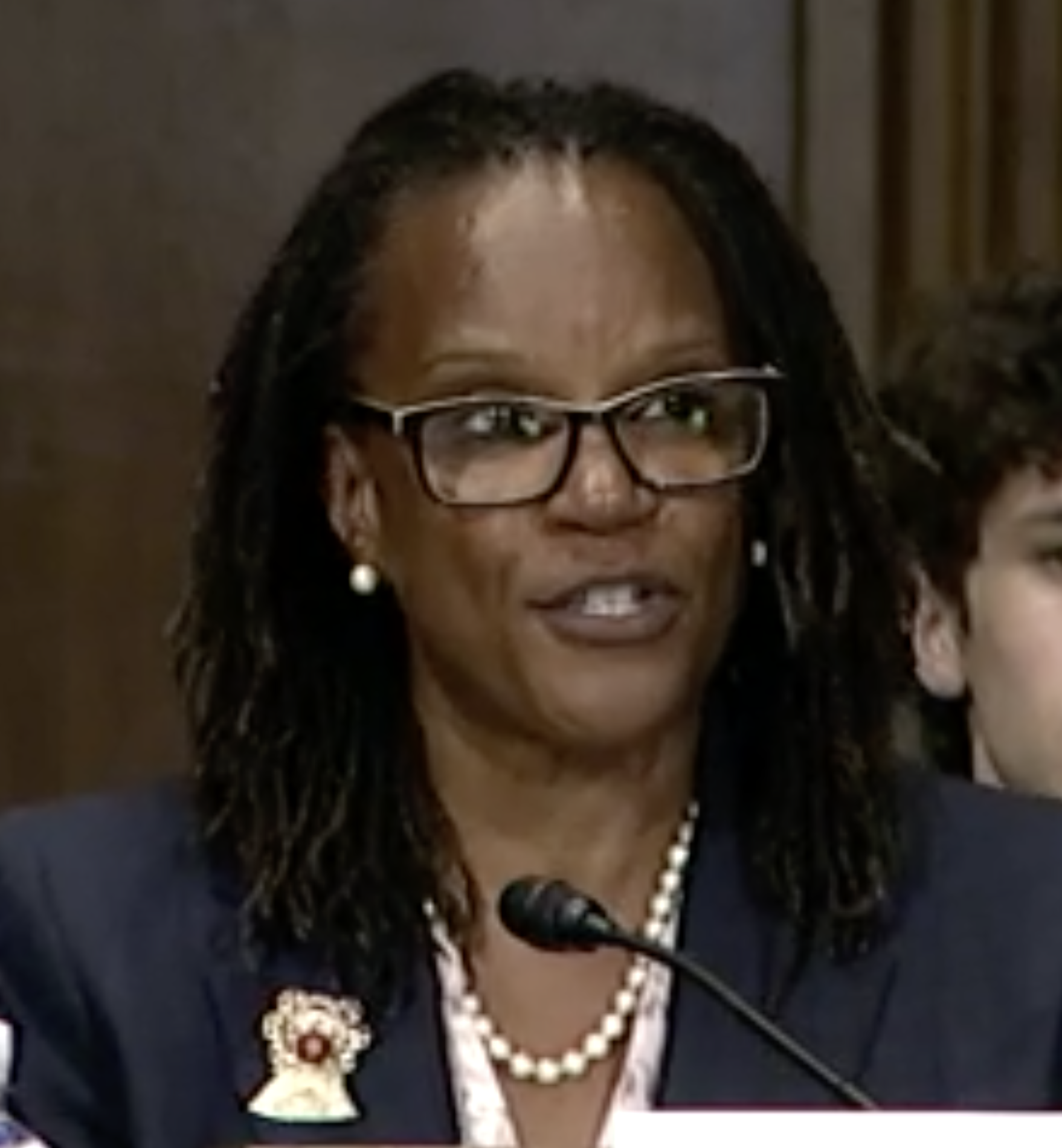

Judge of the United States District Court for the District of New Jersey
- Incumbent
- Assumed office November 1, 2021
- Appointed by: Joe Biden
- Preceded by: Jerome B. Simandle

Magistrate Judge of the United States District Court for the District of New Jersey
- In office 2009–2021

Personal details
- Born: Karen Louise McGlashan; 1963 (age 62–63) Syosset, New York, U.S.
- Education: Pennsylvania State University (BS); Temple University (JD)

Karen McGlashan Williams (née Karen Louise McGlashan, born 1963) is a United States district judge of the United States District Court for the District of New Jersey and a former United States magistrate judge of the same court.

== Early life and education ==
Williams was born Karen Louise McGlashan in 1963, in Syosset, New York. She is the oldest of five siblings. Williams grew up in Freeport, New York, and graduated from Baldwin Senior High School. She received her Bachelor of Science from the Pennsylvania State University in 1985 and her Juris Doctor from the Temple University Beasley School of Law in 1992.

== Career ==
Williams spent 17 years in private practice at Jasinski & Williams, P.C. in Atlantic City, New Jersey.

Williams represented Atlantic City in an appeal of a decision finding that the city had violated a firefighter's First Amendment rights. The city disciplined him for using a racial slur against an African-American police officer. From 2010 to 2014, she served as an adjunct professor at Rutgers Law School-Camden. Since 2020, she has served as an adjunct instructor for undergraduate students at Rowan University.

In 2002, Williams defended Atlantic City against accusations by a former city employee alleged to have been a victim of gender discrimination, sexual harassment, and retaliation. In 2005, Williams defended Atlantic City in a case where a former city employee alleged violations of the Americans With Disabilities Act. Williams argued multiple management-side cases before the National Labor Relations Board.

== Federal judicial service ==
Williams was appointed a United States magistrate judge on May 1, 2009.

On March 30, 2021, President Joe Biden nominated Williams to serve as a United States district judge for the United States District Court for the District of New Jersey to the seat vacated by Judge Jerome B. Simandle, who assumed senior status on May 31, 2017. Williams was recommended by Senator Cory Booker. Progressive magazine The American Prospect criticized Williams' nomination, saying "Williams spent many years as a management-side labor and employment attorney, even arguing cases against workplace sexual harassment claims, a troubling background to those hoping for judicial appointments that might defend workers." On July 14, 2021, a hearing on her nomination was held before the Senate Judiciary Committee. On August 5, 2021, her nomination was reported out of committee by a 16–6 vote. On October 26, 2021, the United States Senate invoked cloture on her nomination by a 58–40 vote. Her nomination was confirmed later that day by a 56–38 vote. She received her judicial commission on November 1, 2021. She is the first Black judge to sit in the Camden courthouse.

== See also ==
- Joe Biden judicial appointment controversies
- List of African-American federal judges
- List of African-American jurists

Legal offices
Preceded by Jerome B. Simandle	Judge of the United States District Court for the District of New Jersey; 2021–present	Incumbent
