= Phillip Forman =

American judge (1895-1978)

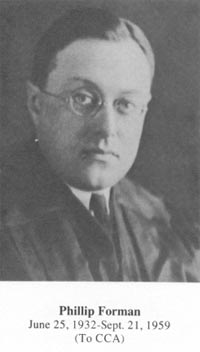

Senior Judge of the United States Court of Appeals for the Third Circuit
- In office March 31, 1961 – August 17, 1978

Judge of the United States Court of Appeals for the Third Circuit
- In office September 10, 1959 – March 31, 1961
- Appointed by: Dwight D. Eisenhower
- Preceded by: Albert Branson Maris
- Succeeded by: William Francis Smith

Chief Judge of the United States District Court for the District of New Jersey
- In office 1951–1959
- Preceded by: Guy Leverne Fake
- Succeeded by: William Francis Smith

Judge of the United States District Court for the District of New Jersey
- In office June 25, 1932 – September 20, 1959
- Appointed by: Herbert Hoover
- Preceded by: William Nelson Runyon
- Succeeded by: Arthur Stephen Lane

United States Attorney for the District of New Jersey
- In office 1928–1932
- Appointed by: Calvin Coolidge
- Preceded by: Walter G. Winne
- Succeeded by: Harlan Besson

Personal details
- Born: Phillip Forman; November 30, 1895 New York City, New York, U.S.
- Died: August 17, 1978 (aged 82) Trenton, New Jersey, U.S.
- Spouse: Pearl Karlberg

Phillip Forman (November 30, 1895 – August 17, 1978) was a United States circuit judge of the United States Court of Appeals for the Third Circuit and previously was a United States district judge of the United States District Court for the District of New Jersey.

== Education and career ==
Born in New York City on November 30, 1895, Forman grew up in Trenton, New Jersey. He received a Bachelor of Laws in 1919 from the Temple University Beasley School of Law. He served in the United States Navy from 1917 to 1919 during World War I era. He entered private practice in Trenton, New Jersey from 1919 to 1932. He was an Assistant United States Attorney for the District of New Jersey from 1923 to 1928 and was the United States Attorney for the District of New Jersey from 1928 to 1932.

== Federal judicial service ==
Forman was nominated by President Herbert Hoover on June 11, 1932, to a seat on the United States District Court for the District of New Jersey vacated by Judge William Nelson Runyon. He was confirmed by the United States Senate on June 23, 1932, and received his commission on June 25, 1932. He served as Chief Judge from 1951 to 1959 and as a member of the Judicial Conference of the United States from 1957 to 1959. His service terminated on September 20, 1959, due to his elevation to the Third Circuit.

Forman was nominated by President Dwight D. Eisenhower on February 9, 1959, to a seat on the United States Court of Appeals for the Third Circuit vacated by Judge Albert Branson Maris. He was confirmed by the Senate on September 9, 1959, and received his commission the next day. He assumed senior status on March 31, 1961.

=== Notable grants of citizenship ===
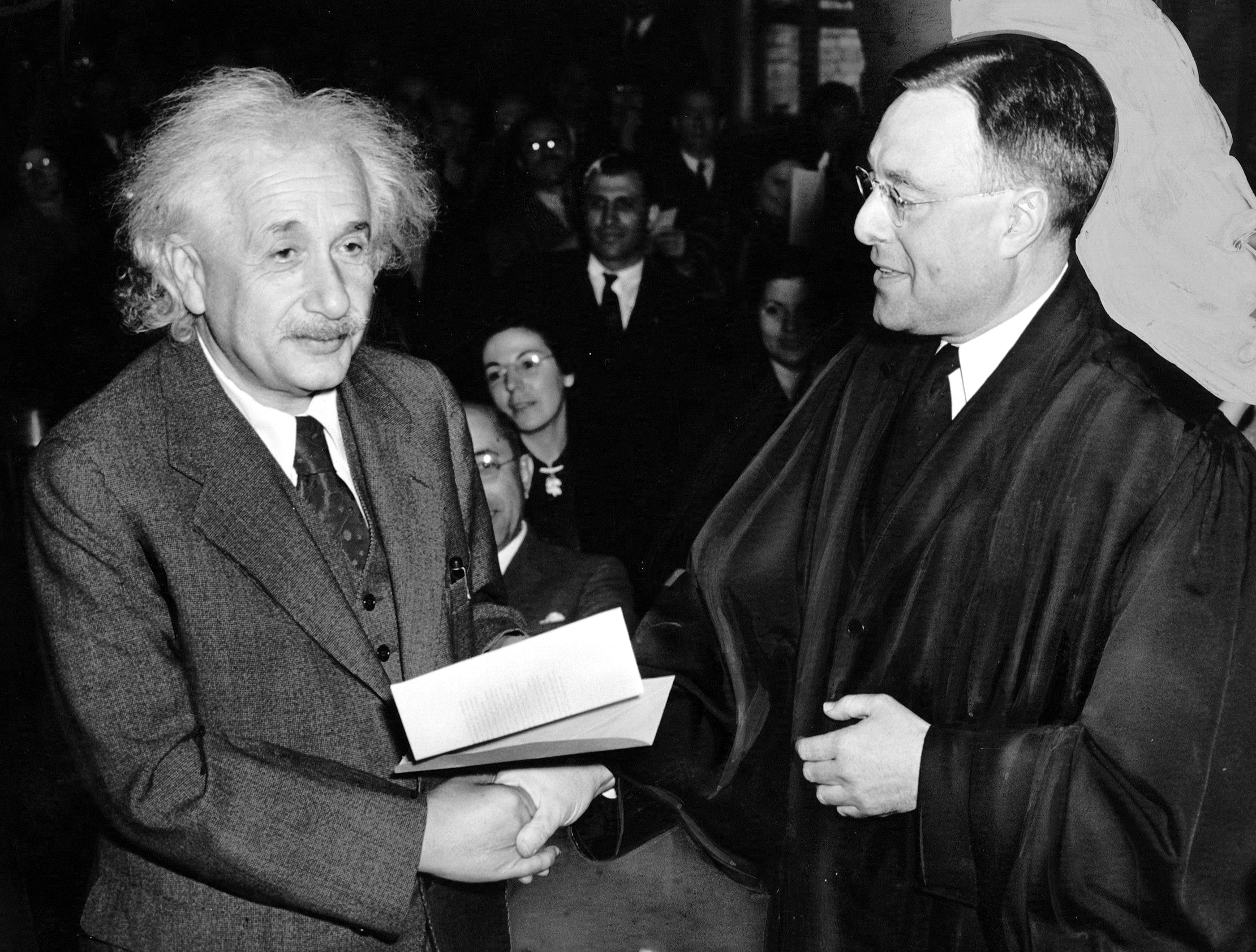
Judge Forman (r) awards Albert Einstein his certificate of the American citizenship on October 1, 1940.

In 1940, Forman gave the German physicist Albert Einstein his United States Citizenship. He served the same role for the mathematician Kurt Gödel.

== Personal life and death ==
Forman was married to the former Pearl Karlberg. He died at a hospital in Trenton, New Jersey, on August 17, 1978, at the age of 82.

== See also ==
- List of Jewish American jurists
- List of United States federal judges by longevity of service

== Sources ==
Legal offices
Preceded by Walter G. Winne	United States Attorney for the District of New Jersey; 1928–1932	Succeeded by Harlan Besson
Preceded by William Nelson Runyon	Judge of the United States District Court for the District of New Jersey; 1932–1959	Succeeded by Arthur Stephen Lane
Preceded by Guy Leverne Fake	Chief Judge of the United States District Court for the District of New Jersey; 1951–1959	Succeeded by William Francis Smith
Preceded by Albert Branson Maris	Judge of the United States Court of Appeals for the Third Circuit; 1959–1961	Succeeded by William Francis Smith
