= List of federal judges appointed by John F. Kennedy =

Following is a list of all Article III United States federal judges appointed by President John F. Kennedy during his presidency. In total Kennedy appointed 126 Article III federal judges, including 2 Justices to the Supreme Court of the United States, 20 judges to the United States Courts of Appeals, 102 judges to the United States district courts, 1 judge to the United States Court of Customs and Patent Appeals and 1 judge to the United States Court of Claims. Two of Kennedy's District Judge appointees, Andrew Augustine Caffrey and Cyrus Nils Tavares, were recess appointed and nominated by President Dwight D. Eisenhower, before being confirmed by the United States Senate and receiving their commissions from President Kennedy.

Additionally, 1 Article I judicial appointment is listed, namely to the United States Tax Court.

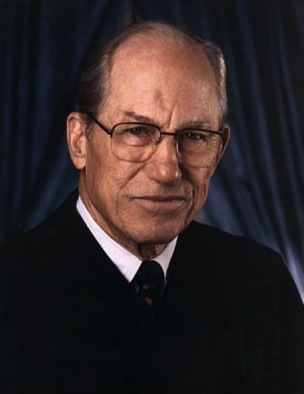
Byron White, one of Kennedy's two appointments to the Supreme Court.

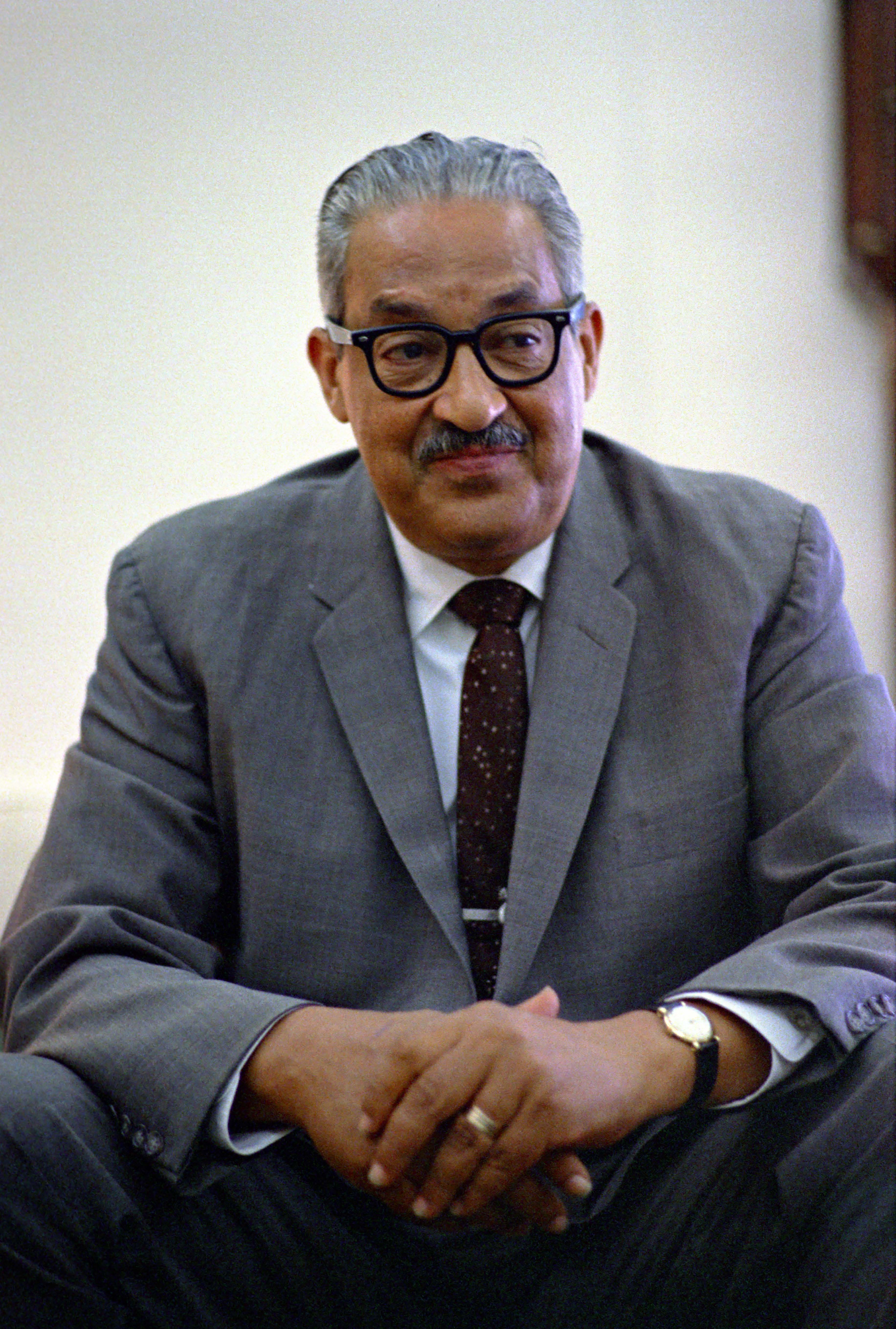
Thurgood Marshall, appointed by Kennedy to the United States Court of Appeals for the Second Circuit before being elevated to the Supreme Court.

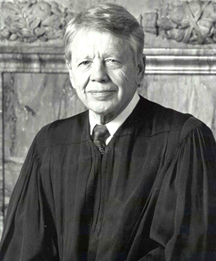
James R. Browning formerly of the Ninth Circuit, deceased in 2012, was the longest serving Court of Appeals judge appointed by Kennedy.

== United States Supreme Court justices ==
#	Justice	Seat	State	Former justice	Nomination date	Confirmation date	Began active service	Ended active service	Ended retired service
1	Byron White	6	Colorado	Charles Evans Whittaker	April 3, 1962	April 11, 1962	April 12, 1962	June 28, 1993	April 15, 2002
2	Arthur Goldberg	2	Illinois	Felix Frankfurter	August 31, 1962	September 25, 1962	September 28, 1962	July 25, 1965	–

== Courts of appeals ==
#	Judge	Circuit	Nomination date	Confirmation date	Began active service	Ended active service	Ended senior status
1	Albert Alphonso Ridge	Eighth	May 23, 1961	June 14, 1961	June 15, 1961	April 16, 1965	March 2, 1967
2	Roger Kiley	Seventh	June 20, 1961	June 27, 1961	June 30, 1961	January 1, 1974	September 6, 1974
3	Albert Vickers Bryan	Fourth	August 2, 1961	August 15, 1961	August 15, 1961	May 3, 1972	March 13, 1984
4	James Cullen Ganey	Third	August 3, 1961	August 15, 1961	August 15, 1961	August 15, 1966	February 7, 1972
5	William Francis Smith	Third	August 15, 1961	August 30, 1961	August 30, 1961	February 26, 1968	–
6	James R. Browning	Ninth	September 6, 1961	September 14, 1961	September 18, 1961	September 1, 2000	May 6, 2012
7	Ben C. Duniway	Ninth	September 14, 1961	September 21, 1961	September 22, 1961	October 5, 1976	August 23, 1986
8	Delmas Carl Hill	Tenth	September 14, 1961	September 21, 1961	September 22, 1961	April 1, 1977	December 2, 1989
9	Irving Kaufman	Second	September 14, 1961	September 21, 1961	September 22, 1961	July 1, 1987	February 1, 1992
10	J. Spencer Bell	Fourth	September 14, 1961	September 23, 1961	September 27, 1961	March 19, 1967	–
11	Luther Merritt Swygert	Seventh	September 18, 1961	September 23, 1961	September 29, 1961	July 1, 1981	March 16, 1988
12	Griffin Bell	Fifth	September 20, 1961 (Note: Renominated on January 15, 1962.)	February 5, 1962	October 5, 1961	March 1, 1976	–
13	Walter Pettus Gewin	Fifth	September 20, 1961	February 5, 1962	October 5, 1961	November 1, 1976	May 15, 1981
14	Paul R. Hays	Second	September 23, 1961	March 16, 1962	October 5, 1961	September 11, 1974	February 13, 1980
15	Thurgood Marshall	Second	September 23, 1961	September 11, 1962	October 5, 1961	August 23, 1965	–
16	J. Skelly Wright	D.C.	February 2, 1962	March 28, 1962	March 30, 1962	June 1, 1986	August 6, 1988
17	Oliver Seth	Tenth	May 24, 1962	June 11, 1962	June 20, 1962	December 25, 1984	March 27, 1996
18	Carl E. McGowan	D.C.	August 16, 1962 (Note: Renominated on January 15, 1963.)	March 15, 1963	March 27, 1963	August 31, 1981	December 21, 1987
19	Harry Phillips	Sixth	June 4, 1963	June 28, 1963	July 3, 1963	January 15, 1979	August 3, 1985
20	Pat Mehaffy	Eighth	June 24, 1963	July 15, 1963	July 16, 1963	August 31, 1974	January 31, 1981

== District courts ==
#	Judge	Court (Note: See List of United States district and territorial courts)	Nomination date	Confirmation date	Began active service	Ended active service	Ended senior status
1	Cyrus Nils Tavares (Note: Recess appointed and nominated by Dwight D. Eisenhower but received commission from John F. Kennedy.)	D. Haw.	January 10, 1961 (Note: Previously nominated by President Eisenhower on January 14, 1960. That nomination expired at the end of the term. Renominated by President Eisenhower on January 10, 1961.)	September 21, 1961	October 13, 1960	April 12, 1972	August 3, 1976
2	Andrew A. Caffrey	D. Mass.	January 10, 1961 (Note: Previously nominated by President Eisenhower on July 1, 1960. That nomination expired at the end of the term. Renominated by President Eisenhower on January 10, 1961.)	August 9, 1961	October 13, 1960	October 17, 1986	October 6, 1993
3	William McRae	S.D. Fla. / M.D. Fla.	February 20, 1961	March 3, 1961	March 8, 1961	January 27, 1973	–
4	Reynaldo Guerra Garza	S.D. Tex.	March 24, 1961	April 13, 1961	April 14, 1961	August 1, 1979	Elevated
5	Frank Wiley Wilson	E.D. Tenn.	May 24, 1961	June 14, 1961	June 15, 1961	September 29, 1982	–
6	William Harold Cox	S.D. Miss.	June 20, 1961	June 27, 1961	June 30, 1961	October 4, 1982	February 25, 1988
7	Thomas J. Michie	W.D. Va.	May 11, 1961	June 27, 1961	June 30, 1961	April 9, 1973	–
8	Edward Dumbauld	W.D. Pa.	August 2, 1961	August 2, 1961	August 3, 1961	December 31, 1976	September 6, 1997
9	James Braxton Craven Jr.	W.D.N.C.	July 24, 1961	August 9, 1961	August 10, 1961	July 5, 1966	Elevated
10	Earl R. Larson	D. Minn.	July 24, 1961	August 9, 1961	August 10, 1961	June 30, 1977	October 31, 2001
11	Lewis Render Morgan	N.D. Ga.	July 24, 1961	August 9, 1961	August 10, 1961	October 2, 1968	Elevated
12	Richard B. Austin	N.D. Ill.	August 7, 1961	August 15, 1961	August 15, 1961	October 10, 1975	February 7, 1977
13	William T. Beeks	W.D. Wash.	August 4, 1961	August 15, 1961	August 15, 1961	May 31, 1973	December 30, 1988
14	Mosher Joseph Blumenfeld	D. Conn.	August 7, 1961	August 15, 1961	August 15, 1961	January 20, 1977	November 5, 1988
15	Bailey Brown	W.D. Tenn.	August 7, 1961	August 21, 1961	August 21, 1961	September 26, 1979	Elevated
16	Arthur Marshall Davis	D. Ariz.	August 8, 1961	August 21, 1961	August 21, 1961	July 11, 1963	–
17	John Davis Larkins Jr.	E.D.N.C.	August 8, 1961	August 21, 1961	August 21, 1961	June 8, 1979	February 16, 1990
18	Luther L. Bohanon	E.D. Okla. N.D. Okla. W.D. Okla.	August 18, 1961	August 30, 1961	August 30, 1961	August 2, 1974	July 18, 2003
19	Floyd Robert Gibson	W.D. Mo.	August 17, 1961	August 30, 1961	August 30, 1961	June 20, 1965	Elevated
20	James Benton Parsons	N.D. Ill.	August 10, 1961	August 30, 1961	August 30, 1961	August 30, 1981	June 19, 1993
21	Michael Henry Sheridan	M.D. Pa.	August 15, 1961	August 30, 1961	August 30, 1961	August 23, 1976	–
22	Edward Skottowe Northrop	D. Md.	August 23, 1961	September 1, 1961	September 5, 1961	June 12, 1981	August 12, 2003
23	Thaddeus M. Machrowicz	E.D. Mich.	August 25, 1961	September 1, 1961	September 7, 1961	February 17, 1970	–
24	Joseph Simon Lord III	E.D. Pa.	August 31, 1961	September 14, 1961	September 15, 1961	July 1, 1982	April 23, 1991
25	Elmer Gordon West	E.D. La. / M.D. La.	September 5, 1961	September 14, 1961	September 15, 1961	November 27, 1979	November 2, 1992
26	William H. Becker	W.D. Mo.	August 21, 1961	September 8, 1961	September 18, 1961	February 8, 1977	February 2, 1992
27	T. Emmet Clarie	D. Conn.	September 5, 1961	September 14, 1961	September 18, 1961	January 1, 1983	September 24, 1997
28	David W. Dyer	S.D. Fla.	September 1, 1961	September 8, 1961	September 18, 1961	September 22, 1966	Elevated
29	James Robert Martin Jr.	E.D.S.C. W.D.S.C. / D.S.C.	August 30, 1961	September 8, 1961	September 18, 1961	November 20, 1979	November 14, 1984
30	Raymond Eugene Plummer	D. Alaska	August 28, 1961	September 8, 1961	September 18, 1961	June 1, 1973	December 26, 1987
31	Richard Johnson Putnam	W.D. La.	September 5, 1961	September 14, 1961	September 18, 1961	December 19, 1975	December 16, 2002
32	Albert Lee Stephens Jr.	S.D. Cal. / C.D. Cal.	August 28, 1961	September 8, 1961	September 18, 1961	June 1, 1979	September 6, 2001
33	George C. Young	N.D. Fla. S.D. Fla. / M.D. Fla.	September 5, 1961	September 14, 1961	September 18, 1961	October 19, 1981	April 24, 2015
34	Robert A. Ainsworth Jr.	E.D. La.	September 14, 1961	September 21, 1961	September 22, 1961	August 31, 1966	Elevated
35	Anthony T. Augelli	D.N.J.	September 14, 1961	September 21, 1961	September 22, 1961	April 1, 1972	August 31, 1974
36	Frank J. Battisti	N.D. Ohio	August 23, 1961	September 21, 1961	September 22, 1961	April 1, 1994	October 19, 1994
37	Thomas Francis Croake	S.D.N.Y.	September 14, 1961	September 21, 1961	September 22, 1961	January 31, 1972	July 21, 1978
38	Samuel Hugh Dillin	S.D. Ind.	September 14, 1961	September 21, 1961	September 22, 1961	March 31, 1993	March 13, 2006
39	John Francis Dooling Jr.	E.D.N.Y.	September 14, 1961	September 21, 1961	September 22, 1961	November 30, 1976	January 12, 1981
40	William Edward Doyle	D. Colo.	September 14, 1961	September 21, 1961	September 22, 1961	May 17, 1971	Elevated
41	Abraham Lincoln Freedman	E.D. Pa.	September 1, 1961	September 14, 1961	September 22, 1961	July 6, 1964	Elevated
42	Alfred Leopold Luongo	E.D. Pa.	September 14, 1961	September 21, 1961	September 22, 1961	July 19, 1986	–
43	Thomas Jamison MacBride	N.D. Cal. / E.D. Cal.	September 14, 1961	September 21, 1961	September 22, 1961	March 25, 1979	January 6, 2000
44	Martin Pence	D. Haw.	September 14, 1961	September 21, 1961	September 22, 1961	November 18, 1974	January 31, 2000
45	Hubert Louis Will	N.D. Ill.	September 14, 1961	September 21, 1961	September 22, 1961	April 23, 1979	December 9, 1995
46	Alfonso Zirpoli	N.D. Cal.	September 14, 1961	September 21, 1961	September 22, 1961	September 30, 1975	July 10, 1995
47	Wade H. McCree	E.D. Mich.	September 18, 1961	September 23, 1961	September 29, 1961	September 13, 1966	Elevated
48	Ben Charles Green	N.D. Ohio	September 23, 1961	June 29, 1962	October 5, 1961	January 5, 1976	January 12, 1983
49	John Weld Peck II	S.D. Ohio	September 23, 1961	April 11, 1962	October 5, 1961	August 4, 1966	Elevated
50	Clarence W. Allgood	N.D. Ala.	September 23, 1961	February 5, 1962	October 5, 1961	January 9, 1973	November 30, 1991
51	Talbot Smith	E.D. Mich.	September 23, 1961	February 5, 1962	October 5, 1961	October 31, 1971	December 21, 1978
52	Dudley Baldwin Bonsal	S.D.N.Y.	September 23, 1961	March 16, 1962	October 5, 1961	December 6, 1976	July 22, 1995
53	Leo Brewster	N.D. Tex.	September 25, 1961	March 16, 1962	October 5, 1961	November 1, 1973	November 27, 1979
54	Wilfred Feinberg	S.D.N.Y.	September 23, 1961	March 16, 1962	October 5, 1961	March 7, 1966	Elevated
55	Sarah T. Hughes	N.D. Tex.	September 25, 1961	March 16, 1962	October 5, 1961	August 4, 1975	April 23, 1985
56	James Latane Noel Jr.	S.D. Tex.	September 25, 1961	March 16, 1962	October 5, 1961	December 15, 1976	August 29, 1997
57	George Rosling	E.D.N.Y.	September 21, 1961	March 16, 1962	October 5, 1961	April 16, 1973	–
58	Adrian Anthony Spears	W.D. Tex.	September 25, 1961	March 16, 1962	October 5, 1961	October 10, 1979	December 31, 1982
59	Irving Ben Cooper	S.D.N.Y.	September 23, 1961	September 20, 1962	October 5, 1961	February 7, 1972	September 17, 1996
60	Frederick Alvin Daugherty	E.D. Okla. N.D. Okla. W.D. Okla.	September 23, 1961	February 7, 1962	October 5, 1961	January 12, 1982	April 7, 2006
61	L. Richardson Preyer	M.D.N.C.	January 15, 1962	February 7, 1962	October 7, 1961	October 9, 1963	–
62	Harrison Lee Winter	D. Md.	January 15, 1962	February 7, 1962	November 9, 1961	June 27, 1966	Elevated
63	Louis Rosenberg	W.D. Pa.	January 15, 1962	July 10, 1962	November 20, 1961	January 5, 1976	July 2, 1999
64	Frank Gray Jr.	M.D. Tenn.	January 15, 1962	February 7, 1962	November 20, 1961	July 15, 1977	September 6, 1978
65	Charles Gelbert Neese	E.D. Tenn.	January 15, 1962	February 7, 1962	November 20, 1961	August 31, 1982	October 22, 1989
66	J. Robert Elliott	M.D. Ga.	January 23, 1962	February 7, 1962	February 17, 1962	December 31, 2000	–
67	James Hargrove Meredith	E.D. Mo.	March 5, 1962	March 16, 1962	March 17, 1962	August 31, 1979	December 8, 1988
68	John Watkins Oliver	W.D. Mo.	March 5, 1962	April 2, 1962	April 3, 1962	November 3, 1980	April 25, 1990
69	John Keating Regan	E.D. Mo.	March 5, 1962	April 2, 1962	April 3, 1962	April 7, 1977	March 9, 1987
70	Ralph C. Body	E.D. Pa.	March 5, 1962	April 2, 1962	April 4, 1962	May 30, 1972	June 2, 1973
71	Wesley E. Brown	D. Kan.	March 8, 1962	April 2, 1962	April 4, 1962	September 1, 1979	January 23, 2012
72	James Aloysius Coolahan	D.N.J.	February 19, 1962	April 2, 1962	April 7, 1962	June 1, 1974	July 16, 1986
73	George N. Beamer	N.D. Ind.	March 8, 1962	April 11, 1962	April 12, 1962	October 21, 1974	–
74	Frank Burton Ellis	E.D. La.	February 2, 1962	April 3, 1962	April 12, 1962	November 16, 1965	November 3, 1969
75	William Blakely Jones	D.D.C.	March 19, 1962	April 11, 1962	April 12, 1962	March 20, 1977	July 31, 1979
76	Robert Shaw	D.N.J.	March 19, 1962	April 11, 1962	April 12, 1962	July 9, 1972	–
77	Henry George Templar	D. Kan.	March 21, 1962	April 11, 1962	April 12, 1962	November 1, 1974	August 5, 1988
78	Jesse E. Eschbach	N.D. Ind.	March 12, 1962	April 2, 1962	April 13, 1962	December 11, 1981	Elevated
79	Stephen John Roth	E.D. Mich.	April 19, 1962	May 1, 1962	May 7, 1962	July 11, 1974	–
80	John D. Butzner Jr.	E.D. Va.	May 15, 1962	June 15, 1962	June 20, 1962	August 1, 1967	Elevated
81	Roger D. Foley	D. Nev.	June 12, 1962	June 29, 1962	July 2, 1962	October 29, 1982	January 7, 1996
82	Edward J. McManus	N.D. Iowa	June 23, 1962	July 13, 1962	July 16, 1962	February 9, 1985	March 20, 2017
83	William Cook Hanson	N.D. Iowa; S.D. Iowa	June 23, 1962	July 13, 1962	July 23, 1962	August 15, 1977	June 6, 1995
84	Noel Peter Fox	W.D. Mich.	July 12, 1962	July 25, 1962	July 31, 1962	December 31, 1979	June 3, 1987
85	Allen E. Barrow	N.D. Okla.	July 18, 1962	August 1, 1962	August 2, 1962	February 26, 1979	–
86	Mitchell Harry Cohen	D.N.J.	July 6, 1962	August 1, 1962	August 2, 1962	September 11, 1974	January 7, 1991
87	Harold R. Tyler Jr.	S.D.N.Y.	May 17, 1962	August 1, 1962	August 2, 1962	April 6, 1975	–
88	Charles Hardy Carr	S.D. Cal. / C.D. Cal.	July 12, 1962	August 9, 1962	August 14, 1962	August 18, 1973	March 13, 1976
89	Stanley Alexander Weigel	N.D. Cal.	July 6, 1962	August 9, 1962	August 15, 1962	October 9, 1982	September 30, 1997
90	Edward Cochrane McLean	S.D.N.Y.	April 3, 1962	July 13, 1962	August 24, 1962	October 12, 1972	–
91	Jesse William Curtis Jr.	S.D. Cal. / C.D. Cal.	August 3, 1962	August 25, 1962	August 27, 1962	December 31, 1975	February 5, 1990
92	Elisha Avery Crary	S.D. Cal. / C.D. Cal.	July 31, 1962	August 25, 1962	August 28, 1962	June 24, 1975	April 28, 1978
93	Inzer Bass Wyatt	S.D.N.Y.	July 5, 1962	September 20, 1962	September 28, 1962	March 29, 1977	January 17, 1990
94	Bernard Martin Decker	N.D. Ill.	January 15, 1963	March 28, 1963	December 12, 1962	April 2, 1980	November 3, 1993
95	William Joseph Nealon Jr.	M.D. Pa.	January 15, 1963	March 15, 1963	December 13, 1962	January 1, 1989	August 30, 2018
96	Harry Vearle Payne	D.N.M.	February 18, 1963	March 19, 1963	March 27, 1963	April 6, 1978	July 20, 1983
97	Charles B. Fulton	S.D. Fla.	April 4, 1963	April 24, 1963	April 26, 1963	June 30, 1978	May 15, 1996
98	John M. Cannella	S.D.N.Y.	April 4, 1963	June 28, 1963	July 3, 1963	December 31, 1977	October 30, 1996
99	Bruce Rutherford Thompson	D. Nev.	July 9, 1963	August 6, 1963	August 16, 1963	August 31, 1978	February 10, 1992
100	Walter Early Craig	D. Ariz.	August 26, 1963	September 25, 1963	October 2, 1963	October 1, 1979	June 29, 1986
101	Abraham Lincoln Marovitz	N.D. Ill.	July 16, 1963	September 25, 1963	October 2, 1963	August 10, 1975	March 17, 2001
102	Bernard Thomas Moynahan Jr.	E.D. Ky.	September 16, 1963	November 4, 1963	November 8, 1963	September 30, 1984	September 30, 1999

== Specialty courts (Article III) ==
=== United States Court of Customs and Patent Appeals ===
#	Judge	Nomination date	Confirmation date	Began active service	Ended active service	Ended senior status
1	J. Lindsay Almond	April 16, 1962	June 28, 1963	October 23, 1962	March 1, 1973	April 14, 1986

=== United States Court of Claims ===
#	Judge	Nomination date	Confirmation date	Began active service	Ended active service	Ended senior status
1	Oscar Hirsh Davis	January 31, 1962	April 11, 1962	April 12, 1962	June 19, 1988	–

== Specialty court (Article I) ==
=== United States Tax Court ===
#	Judge	Nomination date	Confirmation date	Began active service	Ended active service	Ended senior status
1	Howard Dawson	–	–	August 21, 1962	June 2, 1985	July 15, 2016

== Sources ==
- Federal Judicial Center
