= Guy Leverne Fake =

American judge

Guy Leverne

Senior Judge of the United States District Court for the District of New Jersey
- In office February 21, 1951 – September 23, 1957

Chief Judge of the United States District Court for the District of New Jersey
- In office 1948–1951
- Preceded by: Office established
- Succeeded by: Phillip Forman

Judge of the United States District Court for the District of New Jersey
- In office February 12, 1929 – February 21, 1951
- Appointed by: Calvin Coolidge
- Preceded by: James William McCarthy
- Succeeded by: Richard Hartshorne

Personal details
- Born: Guy Leverne; November 15, 1879 Cobleskill, New York, U.S.
- Died: September 23, 1957 (aged 77) Rutherford, New Jersey, U.S.
- Education: New York University School of Law (LL.B.)

Guy Leverne Fake (November 15, 1879 – September 23, 1957) was a United States district judge of the United States District Court for the District of New Jersey.

== Education and career ==
Born in Cobleskill, New York, Fake lived in Rutherford, New Jersey from the age of one. He served in the United States Army during the Spanish–American War in 1898. He received a Bachelor of Laws from New York University School of Law in 1904, and held a private practice in Rutherford from 1904 to 1907. He was a member of the New Jersey General Assembly from 1907 to 1908, and a district court judge of the Second Judicial District of Bergen County, New Jersey from 1909 to 1924. He was a New Jersey Supreme Court Commissioner in 1926.

== Federal judicial service ==
On February 4, 1929, Fake was nominated by President Calvin Coolidge to a seat on the United States District Court for the District of New Jersey vacated by Judge James William McCarthy. Fake was confirmed by the United States Senate on February 12, 1929, and received his commission the same day. He served as Chief Judge from 1948 to 1951, and assumed senior status on February 21, 1951. He served in that capacity until his death of a heart attack on September 23, 1957, in his home in Rutherford.

== Sources ==
- Guy Laverne [sic] Fake at The Historical Society of the US District Court
- Guy Leverne Fake entry at The Political Graveyard

Legal offices
| Preceded by James William McCarthy | Judge of the United States District Court for the District of New Jersey; 1929–1951 | Succeeded by Richard Hartshorne |
| Preceded by Office established | Chief Judge of the United States District Court for the District of New Jersey; 1948–1951 | Succeeded by Phillip Forman |
