= James Sandman =

American lawyer and academic

James J. Sandman
- Occupations: Lawyer and academic
- Awards: American Lawyer Lifetime Achievement Award (2022); Elected Fellow, American Academy of Arts & Sciences (2021)

Academic background
- Education: B.A. J.D.
- Alma mater: Boston College; University of Pennsylvania Law School

Academic work
- Institutions: University of Pennsylvania Carey Law School

James J. Sandman is an American lawyer and an academic. He is Distinguished Professor of Practice and Public Service at the University of South Carolina Joseph F. Rice School of Law. Additionally, he holds the position of President Emeritus at the Legal Services Corporation.

Sandman is most known for his work to improve access to the American justice system for people who cannot afford lawyers. He is Chair of the District of Columbia Access to Justice Commission and a past President of the District of Columbia Bar. As President of the Legal Services Corporation, the United States’ largest funder of civil legal aid for low-income people, he advocated for the use of technology to provide access to legal information and increased bipartisan support for congressional funding of the Legal Services Corporation. He is also known for his work on professional responsibility, ethics, social justice, equity, and inclusion. He served at Arnold and Porter for 30 years and was the firm's Managing Partner for a decade (1995–2005). He is a recipient of American Lawyer's Lifetime Achievement Award, the District of Columbia Bar's Justice William J. Brennan Award, and the 2016 Cornelius Alexander Humanitarian Award from the District of Columbia Commission on Human Rights

Sandman is a fellow of the American Academy of Arts and Sciences. He is a member of the American Law Institute.

== Education ==
Sandman completed his Bachelor of Arts in History, summa cum laude, at Boston College in 1973. Later in 1976, he earned a J.D. degree, cum laude, from the University of Pennsylvania Law School.

== Career ==
Sandman served as a law clerk to Judge Max Rosenn of the United States Court of Appeals for the Third Circuit from 1976 to 1977. From 1977 until 2007, he practiced law with Arnold & Porter LLP, where he undertook various roles, including associate, partner, and managing partner. From 2007 to 2011, he served as the General Counsel of the District of Columbia Public Schools. In 2011, he assumed the position of president at the Legal Services Corporation, where he served until 2020 and a member of the District of Columbia Public Charter School Board. From 2020 until 2026, he was Distinguished Lecturer at the University of Pennsylvania Carey Law School.

== Research ==
Sandman has written on the challenges faced by women in the legal profession, the barriers low-income households face in obtaining representation in civil cases, and the importance of funding civil legal aid for low-income individuals in the United States.

== Awards and honors ==
- 2015 – Justice William J. Brennan Jr. Award, District of Columbia Bar
- 2016 – Cornelius Alexander Humanitarian Award, District of Columbia Commission on Human Rights
- 2017 – Louis Stokes Paragon Award, Legal Aid Society of Cleveland
- 2021 – Distinguished Life Fellow Award, Fellows of the American Bar Foundation
- 2021 – Honorary Doctor of Laws Recipient, Albany Law School
- 2022 – Access to Justice Award, Fayette County (Kentucky) Bar Association
- 2022 – Lifetime Achievement Award, The American Lawyer
- 2023 – Honorary Doctor of Laws Recipient, Wilkes University

== Selected articles ==
- Sandman, J. J. (2002). The Business Case for Effective Part-Time Programs. Women Law. J., 88, 16.
- Sandman, J. J. (2005). The Character of Max Rosenn. U. Pa. L. Rev., 154, 1049.
- Sandman, J. J. (2014). The Current State of Access to Justice in the United States. Geo. J. on Poverty L. & Pol'y, 22, 453.
- Sandman, J. J. (2019). The role of the Legal Services Corporation in improving access to justice. Daedalus, 148(1), 113–119.
- Sandman, J. J. (2021). Introduction: Meeting the Legal Needs of Disaster Survivors. The Urban Lawyer, 51(3), 457–458.
