= Jerome B. Simandle =

American judge (1949–2019)

Senior Judge of the United States District Court for the District of New Jersey
- In office May 31, 2017 – July 19, 2019

Chief Judge of the United States District Court for the District of New Jersey
- In office January 2, 2012 – May 31, 2017
- Preceded by: Garrett Brown Jr.
- Succeeded by: Jose L. Linares

Judge of the United States District Court for the District of New Jersey
- In office May 26, 1992 – May 31, 2017
- Appointed by: George H. W. Bush
- Preceded by: Seat established by 104 Stat. 5089
- Succeeded by: Karen M. Williams

Magistrate Judge of the United States District Court for the District of New Jersey
- In office 1983–1992

Personal details
- Born: April 29, 1949 Binghamton, New York, U.S.
- Died: July 19, 2019 (aged 70)
- Education: Princeton University (BSE); Stockholm University (Dip); University of Pennsylvania (JD)

Jerome B. Simandle (April 29, 1949 – July 19, 2019) was a United States district judge of the United States District Court for the District of New Jersey.

== Education and career ==
Born in Binghamton, New York. Simandle received a Bachelor of Science in Engineering in 1971 from Princeton University. He received a Diploma in Social Science in 1975 from the Stockholm University in Sweden. He received a Juris Doctor in 1976 from the University of Pennsylvania Law School. After graduating from law school, Simandle served as a law clerk to Judge John F. Gerry of the United States District Court for the District of New Jersey for two years, and then as an Assistant United States Attorney at the U.S. Attorney's Office for the District of New Jersey from 1978 to 1983. From 1982 to 1983, he was the attorney in charge of the Trenton office. He was then a United States Magistrate in the same district for nine years.

== Federal judicial service ==
Simandle was nominated by President George H. W. Bush on April 1, 1992, to a seat on the United States District Court for the District of New Jersey created by 104 Stat. 5089. He was confirmed by the United States Senate on May 21, 1992, and received his commission on May 26, 1992. He served as Chief Judge from January 2, 2012, until he assumed senior status on May 31, 2017. He died on July 19, 2019, from liver cancer.

== Sources ==
Legal offices
Preceded by Seat established by 104 Stat. 5089	Judge of the United States District Court for the District of New Jersey; 1992–2017	Succeeded by Karen M. Williams
Preceded by Garrett Brown Jr.	Chief Judge of the United States District Court for the District of New Jersey; 2012–2017	Succeeded by Jose L. Linares
