= James Aloysius Coolahan =

American judge

Senior Judge of the United States District Court for the District of New Jersey
- In office June 1, 1974 – July 16, 1986

Chief Judge of the United States District Court for the District of New Jersey
- In office 1972–1973
- Preceded by: Anthony T. Augelli
- Succeeded by: Mitchell Harry Cohen

Judge of the United States District Court for the District of New Jersey
- In office April 7, 1962 – June 1, 1974
- Appointed by: John F. Kennedy
- Preceded by: Mendon Morrill
- Succeeded by: John F. Gerry

Personal details
- Born: James Aloysius Coolahan; April 26, 1903 Hoboken, New Jersey, U.S.
- Died: July 16, 1986 (aged 83) Spring Lake, New Jersey, U.S.
- Education: Rutgers Law School (LL.B.)

James Aloysius Coolahan (April 26, 1903 – July 16, 1986) was a United States district judge of the United States District Court for the District of New Jersey.

== Education and career ==
Born in Hoboken, New Jersey, Coolahan received a Bachelor of Laws from Rutgers Law School in 1925. He was a law clerk from 1925 to 1927, and was in private practice in Jersey City, New Jersey from 1927 to 1949, including service as a first assistant corporation counsel to the City of Hoboken from 1932 to 1943. He was a judge of the Hudson County Court in New Jersey from 1949 to 1956, and of the Superior Court of New Jersey from 1956 to 1962.

== Federal judicial service ==
On February 19, 1962, Coolahan was nominated by President John F. Kennedy to a seat on the United States District Court for the District of New Jersey vacated by Judge Mendon Morrill. Coolahan was confirmed by the United States Senate on April 2, 1962, and received his commission on April 7, 1962. He served as Chief Judge from 1972 to 1973, assumed senior status on June 1, 1974, and serving in that capacity until his death on July 16, 1986, in Spring Lake, New Jersey.

== Sources ==
Legal offices
Preceded by Mendon Morrill	Judge of the United States District Court for the District of New Jersey; 1962–1974	Succeeded by John F. Gerry
Preceded by Anthony T. Augelli	Chief Judge of the United States District Court for the District of New Jersey; 1972–1973	Succeeded by Mitchell Harry Cohen
