= Brian R. Martinotti =

American judge (born 1961)

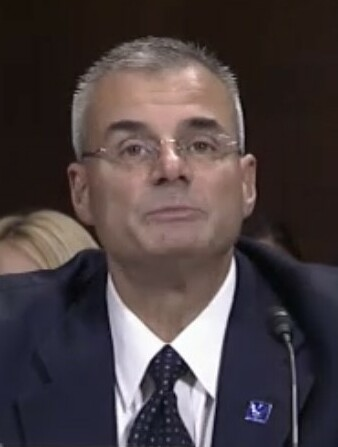
- Martinotti in 2015

Judge of the United States District Court for the District of New Jersey
- Incumbent
- Assumed office July 11, 2016
- Appointed by: Barack Obama
- Preceded by: Stanley R. Chesler

Personal details
- Born: February 2, 1961 (age 65) Englewood, New Jersey, U.S.
- Education: Fordham University (BS); Seton Hall University (JD)

Brian R. Martinotti (born February 2, 1961) is a United States district judge of the United States District Court for the District of New Jersey and a former New Jersey state judge.

== Biography ==
Martinotti was born in 1961. His mother was a librarian and his father, Raymond, was a construction worker.

He received a Bachelor of Science degree in 1983 from Fordham University. He received a Juris Doctor, cum laude, in 1986 from Seton Hall University School of Law. He began his legal career by serving as a law clerk to Judge Roger M. Kahn of the New Jersey Tax Court. From 1987 to 2002, he served at the law firm of Beattie Padovano, LLC., and was elevated to partner in 1994. Concurrently with his private practice, he served as a council member for the Borough of Cliffside Park and also served other towns in various roles as municipal public defender, prosecutor and tax attorney. From 2002–2016, he served as a Judge of the Superior Court of New Jersey, where he served in the civil division and was one of the state's three multi-county litigation judges handling mass torts. During his tenure on the state bench, he was assigned to preside over the special environmental, affordable housing and family law dockets.

=== Federal judicial service ===
On June 11, 2015, President Barack Obama nominated Martinotti to serve as a United States District Judge of the United States District Court for the District of New Jersey, to the seat being vacated by Judge Stanley R. Chesler, who assumed senior status on June 15, 2015. He received a hearing before the Judiciary Committee on September 30, 2015. On October 29, 2015, his nomination was reported out of committee by voice vote. On July 6, 2016, the United States Senate confirmed his nomination by a 92–5 vote. He received his judicial commission on July 11, 2016.

=== Personal ===
Martinotti married the former Dana M. Licameli, a grade school teacher, on March 23, 1991 in a Roman Catholic ceremony.

Legal offices
Preceded by Stanley R. Chesler	Judge of the United States District Court for the District of New Jersey; 2016–present	Incumbent
