= Mendon Morrill =

American judge

Judge of the United States District Court for the District of New Jersey
- In office April 23, 1958 – March 12, 1961
- Appointed by: Dwight D. Eisenhower
- Preceded by: Alfred Egidio Modarelli
- Succeeded by: James Aloysius Coolahan

Personal details
- Born: Mendon Morrill; September 18, 1902 Worcester, Massachusetts, U.S.
- Died: March 12, 1961 (aged 58)
- Education: Harvard College; Harvard Law School (LL.B.)

Mendon Morrill (September 18, 1902 – March 12, 1961) was a United States district judge of the United States District Court for the District of New Jersey.

== Education and career ==
Born in Worcester, Massachusetts, Morrill graduated from Harvard College in 1923 and received a Bachelor of Laws from Harvard Law School in 1926. He was in private practice in Massachusetts and in Paterson, New Jersey. In 1942, he became a first lieutenant in the United States Army.

== Federal judicial service ==
On March 25, 1958, Morrill was nominated by President Dwight D. Eisenhower to a seat on the United States District Court for the District of New Jersey vacated by Judge Alfred E. Modarelli. Morrill was confirmed by the United States Senate on April 22, 1958, and received his commission on April 23, 1958. Morrill served in that capacity until his death on March 12, 1961.

== See also ==
- List of Jewish American jurists

== Sources ==
Legal offices
Preceded by Alfred Egidio Modarelli	Judge of the United States District Court for the District of New Jersey; 1958–1961	Succeeded by James Aloysius Coolahan
