= John Rellstab =

American judge

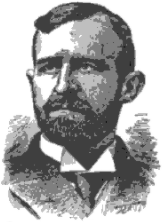

Senior Judge of the United States District Court for the District of New Jersey
- In office October 10, 1928 – September 22, 1930

Judge of the United States District Court for the District of New Jersey
- In office May 18, 1909 – October 10, 1928
- Appointed by: William Howard Taft
- Preceded by: William M. Lanning
- Succeeded by: James William McCarthy

Personal details
- Born: John Rellstab; September 19, 1858 Trenton, New Jersey, U.S.
- Died: September 22, 1930 (aged 72) Lake Placid, New York, U.S.
- Education: read law

John Rellstab (September 19, 1858 – September 22, 1930) was a United States district judge of the United States District Court for the District of New Jersey.

== Education and career ==
Born in Trenton, New Jersey, Rellstab read law to enter the bar in 1882. He was in private practice in Trenton from 1882 to 1896, and was a borough attorney for Chambersburg, New Jersey from 1884 to 1888, and city counsel for Trenton from 1889 to 1892 and from 1894 to 1896. He was a Judge of the District Court of Trenton from 1896 to 1900, and of the Mercer County, New Jersey Court of Common Pleas from 1900 to 1909.

== Federal judicial service ==
On May 6, 1909, Rellstab was nominated by President William Howard Taft to a seat on the United States District Court for the District of New Jersey vacated by Judge William M. Lanning. Rellstab was confirmed by the United States Senate on May 18, 1909, and received his commission the same day. He assumed senior status on October 10, 1928, and served in that capacity until his death on September 22, 1930, in Lake Placid, New York.

== Sources ==
Legal offices
Preceded by William M. Lanning	Judge of the United States District Court for the District of New Jersey; 1909–1928	Succeeded by James William McCarthy
