= Anthony T. Augelli =

American judge (1902–1985)

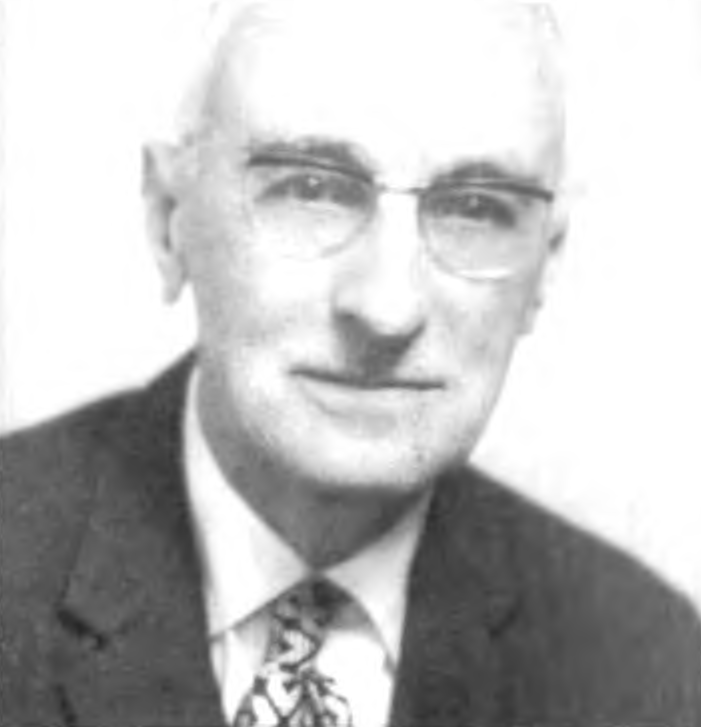

Senior Judge of the United States District Court for the District of New Jersey
- In office April 1, 1972 – August 31, 1974

Chief Judge of the United States District Court for the District of New Jersey
- In office 1968–1972
- Preceded by: Thomas M. Madden
- Succeeded by: James Aloysius Coolahan

Judge of the United States District Court for the District of New Jersey
- In office September 22, 1961 – April 1, 1972
- Appointed by: John F. Kennedy
- Preceded by: Seat established by 75 Stat. 80
- Succeeded by: Seat abolished

Personal details
- Born: Anthony Thomas Augelli; March 27, 1902 Orsara di Puglia, Italy
- Died: October 22, 1985 (aged 83) Spring Lake Heights, New Jersey, U.S.
- Education: Rutgers Law School (LLB, LLM)

Anthony Thomas Augelli (March 27, 1902 – October 22, 1985) was a United States district judge of the United States District Court for the District of New Jersey.

== Education and career ==
Born in Orsara di Puglia, Italy, Augelli received a Bachelor of Laws from New Jersey Law School (now Rutgers Law School) in 1929. He received a Master of Laws from Mercer Beasley School of Law (now Rutgers Law School) in 1934. He was in private practice of law in Jersey City, New Jersey from 1930 to 1961.

== Federal judicial service ==
Augelli was nominated by President John F. Kennedy on September 14, 1961, to the United States District Court for the District of New Jersey, to a new seat created by 75 Stat. 80. He was confirmed by the United States Senate on September 21, 1961, and received his commission on September 22, 1961. He served as Chief Judge from 1968 to 1972. He assumed senior status on April 1, 1972. His service was terminated on August 31, 1974, due to resignation. His resignation was prompted by Congress's refusal to raise judicial salaries.

== Post judicial service and death ==
Following his resignation from the federal bench, Augelli was an umpire of the dealer relations plan for General Motors in Newark, New Jersey from 1974 to 1985. A resident of Spring Lake Heights, New Jersey since moving from Jersey City in 1973, Augelli died at the age of 83 at his home on October 22, 1985.

== Sources ==
Legal offices
Preceded by Seat established by 75 Stat. 80	Judge of the United States District Court for the District of New Jersey; 1961–1972	Succeeded by Seat abolished
Preceded by Thomas M. Madden	Chief Judge of the United States District Court for the District of New Jersey; 1968–1972	Succeeded by James Aloysius Coolahan
