= William O. Douglas Prize =

- Awarded for: Recognizes distinguished contribution by authors to freedom of speech
- Sponsored by: Commission on Freedom of Expression of the Speech Communication Association
- Country: United States

The William O. Douglas Prize (also known as the William O. Douglas Award) is given by the Commission on Freedom of Expression of the Speech Communication Association to honor those who contribute to writing about freedom of speech. The Award is named after William O. Douglas, who served as an Associate Justice of the Supreme Court of the United States from 1939 to 1975.

== Recognition ==
The William O. Douglas Prize is given by the Commission on Freedom of Expression of the Speech Communication Association to authors. The prize recognizes distinguished work in the field of writing about the subject of freedom of speech.

== Honorees ==
- 1986 Gloria Steinem
- 1992 Rodney A. Smolla, Free Speech in an Open Society

== See also ==
- Free speech fights
- Freedom of information
- Perilous Times: Free Speech in Wartime from the Sedition Act of 1798 to the War on Terrorism
- The Freedom Paradox: Towards a Post-Secular Ethics
- William J. Brennan Award
