= Thomas M. Madden =

American judge (1907–1976)

Senior Judge of the United States District Court for the District of New Jersey
- In office January 1, 1968 – March 29, 1976

Chief Judge of the United States District Court for the District of New Jersey
- In office 1961–1968
- Preceded by: William Francis Smith
- Succeeded by: Anthony T. Augelli

Judge of the United States District Court for the District of New Jersey
- In office October 25, 1945 – January 1, 1968
- Appointed by: Harry S. Truman
- Preceded by: John Boyd Avis
- Succeeded by: Leonard I. Garth

Personal details
- Born: Thomas Michael Madden; March 28, 1907 Philadelphia, Pennsylvania, U.S.
- Died: March 29, 1976 (aged 69) Collingswood, New Jersey, U.S.
- Education: Rutgers University (LLB)

Thomas M. Madden (March 28, 1907 – March 29, 1976) was a United States district judge of the United States District Court for the District of New Jersey.

== Early life and career ==
Born in Philadelphia, Pennsylvania, Madden received a Bachelor of Laws from Rutgers Law School in 1930. He then entered private practice in Camden, New Jersey, where he was also the municipal solicitor for Bellmawr, Clementon and Voorhees Township, New Jersey. He was an Assistant United States Attorney of the District of New Jersey from 1943 to 1945.

== Federal judicial service ==
On October 9, 1945, Madden was nominated by President Harry S. Truman to a seat on the United States District Court for the District of New Jersey vacated by Judge John Boyd Avis. Madden was confirmed by the United States Senate on October 23, 1945, and received his commission on October 25, 1945. He served as Chief Judge from 1961 to 1968 and as a member of the Judicial Conference of the United States from 1961 to 1966, assuming senior status due to a certified disability on January 1, 1968. Madden served in that capacity until his death on March 29, 1976, at his home in Collingswood, New Jersey.

== Sources ==
Legal offices
Preceded by John Boyd Avis	Judge of the United States District Court for the District of New Jersey; 1945–1968	Succeeded by Leonard I. Garth
Preceded by William Francis Smith	Chief Judge of the United States District Court for the District of New Jersey; 1961–1968	Succeeded by Anthony T. Augelli
