= Walter G. Winne =

American politician

U.S. Attorney for the District of New Jersey
- In office 1922–1928
- Preceded by: Elmer H. Geran
- Succeeded by: Phillip Forman

Personal details
- Born: February 18, 1889 Brooklyn, New York
- Died: October 15, 1972 (aged 83)
- Education: Rutgers College; New York Law School

Walter Griffen Winne (February 18, 1889 – October 15, 1972) was an American lawyer and politician who served as a member of the New Jersey General Assembly and U.S. Attorney for the District of New Jersey. As Prosecutor for Bergen County, New Jersey, he was indicted on misconduct charges in 1951 but was subsequently acquitted.

He was born in Brooklyn, New York to George T. and Agnes T. (Goff) Winne. He grew up in Hackensack, New Jersey and graduated from Hackensack High School in 1906. He attended Rutgers College, graduating in 1910 with a Bachelor of Literature degree. He attended New York Law School and received a Bachelor of Laws degree in 1912.

Winne was first elected to the New Jersey General Assembly in 1916 and served for four terms. In 1922 President Warren G. Harding appointed him U.S. Attorney for the District of New Jersey. His tenure was marked by many controversies over the enforcement of Prohibition in the state. He held the post until 1928, when he returned to private practice.

He was appointed Bergen County Counsel in 1934 and Prosecutor in 1944. In 1950, he was removed from office as Bergen County Prosecutor by Deputy Attorney General of New Jersey Nelson Stamler, who was conducting an investigation into gambling in the county. He was indicted on 19 counts of misconduct in 1951, with the charges alleging that he had failed to crack down on illegal gambling in Bergen County. U.S. Senator Estes Kefauver, who was holding Senate hearings on organized crime, called law enforcement in Bergen County under Winne "a sorry spectacle."

One of Winne's attorneys in the trial was Joseph Weintraub, who would later serve as Chief Justice of the New Jersey Supreme Court. Richard J. Hughes, later Governor of New Jersey, presided as New Jersey Superior Court judge, and ruled in the pretrial phase that there was insufficient evidence to bring Winne to trial. The decision was reversed by the State Supreme Court and Winne was ultimately tried.

In 1954, Winne was found not guilty on 16 counts of the indictment, and the state dropped the remaining counts. He attempted to recoup $34,000 in lost salary for the three years that he was removed from office, but he lost his case in a 5-2 decision by the State Supreme Court.

Winne continued in private legal practice until his retirement in 1963. He died at the age of 83 at the Van Dyke Nursing Home in Montclair, New Jersey and was to be interred at Hackensack Cemetery.

Legal offices
Preceded by Elmer H. Geran	United States Attorney for the District of New Jersey; 1922 – 1928	Succeeded by Phillip Forman
