= Alfred Egidio Modarelli =

American judge (1898–1957)

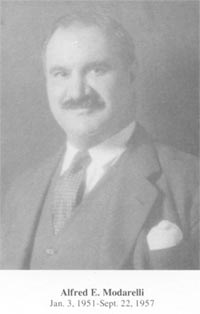

Judge of the United States District Court for the District of New Jersey
- In office January 3, 1951 – September 22, 1957
- Appointed by: Harry S. Truman
- Preceded by: Seat established by 63 Stat. 493
- Succeeded by: Mendon Morrill

Personal details
- Born: Alfred Egidio Modarelli; November 27, 1898 Union City, New Jersey
- Died: September 22, 1957 (aged 58)
- Education: Columbia University (A.B., A.M.); Columbia Law School (LL.M.)

Alfred Egidio Modarelli (November 27, 1898 – September 22, 1957) was a United States district judge of the United States District Court for the District of New Jersey.

== Education and career ==
Born in Union City, New Jersey, Modarelli received an Artium Baccalaureus degree from Columbia University in 1920, an Artium Magister degree from the same institution in 1922, and a Master of Laws from Columbia Law School in 1922. He was in private practice in Union City from 1922 to 1948. He was a Judge of the Municipal Court of Union City from 1925 to 1934, an assistant prosecutor for Hudson County, New Jersey from 1934 to 1944, and a special assistant corporation counsel for Union City from 1944 to 1948. From 1948 to 1951, he served as United States Attorney for the District of New Jersey.

== Federal judicial service ==
On November 29, 1950, Modarelli was nominated by President Harry S. Truman to a new seat on the United States District Court for the District of New Jersey created by 63 Stat. 493. He was confirmed by the United States Senate on January 2, 1951, and received his commission the following day, serving thereafter until his death on September 22, 1957.

== Sources ==
Legal offices
Preceded by Seat established by 63 Stat. 493	Judge of the United States District Court for the District of New Jersey; 1951–1957	Succeeded by Mendon Morrill
