= United States District Court for the District of New Jersey =

United States federal district court of New Jersey

- (D.N.J.)
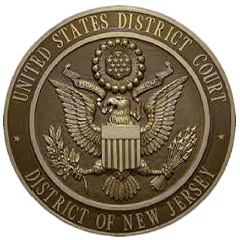
- Location: Martin Luther King Building & U.S. Courthouse (Newark) More locations: Mitchell H. Cohen U.S. Courthouse (Camden); Clarkson S. Fisher Federal Building and U.S. Courthouse (Trenton)
- Appeals to: Third Circuit
- Established: September 24, 1789
- Judges: 17
- Chief Judge: Renée Marie Bumb

Officers of the court
- U.S. Attorney: Robert Frazer
- U.S. Marshal: Juan Mattos Jr.
- www.njd.uscourts.gov

The United States District Court for the District of New Jersey (in case citations, D.N.J.) is a federal court in the Third Circuit (except for patent claims and claims against the U.S. government under the Tucker Act, which are appealed to the Federal Circuit).

The Judiciary Act of 1789 established New Jersey as a single District on September 24, 1789. On February 13, 1801 the Judiciary Act of 1801 reorganized the federal court system, resulting in the state being divided into Eastern and Western districts. The Judiciary Act of 1801 was repealed on March 8, 1802 and New Jersey was re-established as a single district court.

The United States Attorney's Office for the District of New Jersey represents the United States in civil and criminal litigation in the court. Since March 2026, the United States attorney for the District of New Jersey is Robert Frazer.

== Organization of the court ==
The United States District Court for the District of New Jersey holds court at Mitchell H. Cohen Building & U.S. Courthouse in Camden, at Martin Luther King Building & U.S. Courthouse and Frank R. Lautenberg Post Office and Courthouse in Newark, and Clarkson S. Fisher Building & U.S. Courthouse in Trenton.

- Camden Vicinage comprises Atlantic, Burlington, Camden, Cape May, Cumberland, Gloucester, and Salem counties.
- Newark Vicinage comprises Bergen, Essex, Hudson, Morris, Passaic, Sussex, and Union counties, and the northern part of Middlesex County.
- Trenton Vicinage comprises Hunterdon, Mercer, Monmouth, Ocean, Somerset, and Warren counties, and the southern part of Middlesex County.

== Current judges ==
As of May 31, 2024:

#	Title	Judge	Duty station	Born	Term of service			Appointed by
#	Title	Judge	Duty station	Born	Active	Chief	Senior	Appointed by
77	Chief Judge	Renée Marie Bumb	Camden	1960	2006–present	2023–present	—	G.W. Bush
80	District Judge	Susan D. Wigenton	Newark	1962	2006–present	—	—	G.W. Bush
81	District Judge	Claire C. Cecchi	Newark	1964	2011–present	—	—	Obama
82	District Judge	Esther Salas	Newark	1968	2011–present	—	—	Obama
84	District Judge	Michael A. Shipp	Trenton	1965	2012–present	—	—	Obama
85	District Judge	Madeline Cox Arleo	Newark	1963	2014–present	—	—	Obama
87	District Judge	Brian R. Martinotti	Newark	1961	2016–present	—	—	Obama
88	District Judge	Julien Neals	Newark	1965	2021–present	—	—	Biden
89	District Judge	Zahid Quraishi	Trenton	1975	2021–present	—	—	Biden
90	District Judge	Christine O'Hearn	Camden	1969	2021–present	—	—	Biden
91	District Judge	Karen M. Williams	Camden	1963	2021–present	—	—	Biden
92	District Judge	Georgette Castner	Trenton	1979	2022–present	—	—	Biden
93	District Judge	Evelyn Padin	Newark	1960	2022–present	—	—	Biden
94	District Judge	Michael E. Farbiarz	Newark	1973	2023–present	—	—	Biden
95	District Judge	Robert Kirsch	Trenton	1966	2023–present	—	—	Biden
96	District Judge	Jamel K. Semper	Newark	1981	2023–present	—	—	Biden
97	District Judge	Edward S. Kiel	Camden	1965	2024–present	—	—	Biden
51	Senior Judge	Anne Elise Thompson	inactive	1934	1979–2001	1994–2001	2001–present	Carter
54	Senior Judge	Joseph H. Rodriguez	inactive	1930	1985–1998	—	1998–present	Reagan
62	Senior Judge	Mary Little Cooper	inactive	1946	1992–2011	—	2011–present	G.H.W. Bush
68	Senior Judge	Katharine Hayden	Newark	1942	1997–2010	—	2010–present	Clinton
72	Senior Judge	Bill Martini	Newark	1947	2002–2015	—	2015–present	G.W. Bush
74	Senior Judge	Stanley R. Chesler	Newark	1947	2002–2015	—	2015–present	G.W. Bush
79	Senior Judge	Peter G. Sheridan	inactive	1950	2006–2018	—	2018–present	G.W. Bush
83	Senior Judge	Kevin McNulty	inactive	1954	2012–2023	—	2023–present	Obama

== Former judges ==
#	Judge	Born–died	Active service	Chief Judge	Senior status	Appointed by	Reason for termination
1	David Brearley	1745–1790	1789–1790	—	—	Washington	death
2	Robert Morris	1745–1815	1790–1801 (Note: Recess appointment; formally nominated on December 17, 1790, confirmed by the United States Senate on December 20, 1790, and received commission the same day); 1802–1815 (Note: Reassigned from the E.D.N.J. / W.D.N.J.)	—	—	Washington; Operation of law	reassignment death
3	William Pennington	1757–1826	1815–1826 (Note: Recess appointment; formally nominated on January 8, 1816, confirmed by the Senate on January 9, 1816, and received commission on January 16, 1816)	—	—	Madison	death
4	William Rossell	1760–1840	1826–1840 (Note: Recess appointment; formally nominated on December 13, 1826, confirmed by the Senate on December 19, 1826, and received commission the same day)	—	—	J.Q. Adams	death
5	Mahlon Dickerson	1770–1853	1840–1841	—	—	Van Buren	resignation
6	Philemon Dickerson	1788–1862	1841–1862	—	—	Van Buren	death
7	Richard Stockton Field	1803–1870	1863–1870	—	—	Lincoln	resignation
8	John T. Nixon	1820–1889	1870–1889	—	—	Grant	death
9	Edward T. Green	1837–1896	1889–1896 (Note: Recess appointment; formally nominated on December 16, 1889, confirmed by the Senate on January 27, 1890, and received commission the same day)	—	—	B. Harrison	death
10	Andrew Kirkpatrick	1844–1904	1896–1904 (Note: Recess appointment; formally nominated on December 8, 1896, confirmed by the Senate on December 15, 1896, and received commission the same day)	—	—	Cleveland	death
11	William M. Lanning	1849–1912	1904–1909 (Note: Recess appointment; formally nominated on December 6, 1904, confirmed by the Senate on December 13, 1904, and received commission the same day)	—	—	T. Roosevelt	elevation
12	Joseph Cross	1843–1913	1905–1913	—	—	T. Roosevelt	death
13	John Rellstab	1858–1930	1909–1928	—	1928–1930	Taft	death
14	Thomas Griffith Haight	1879–1942	1914–1919	—	—	Wilson	elevation
15	John Warren Davis	1867–1945	1916–1920	—	—	Wilson	elevation
16	Charles Francis Lynch	1884–1942	1919–1925	—	—	Wilson	resignation
17	Joseph Lamb Bodine	1883–1950	1920–1929	—	—	Wilson	resignation
18	William Nelson Runyon	1871–1931	1923–1931	—	—	Harding	death
19	William Clark	1891–1957	1925–1938 (Note: Recess appointment; formally nominated on December 8, 1925, confirmed by the Senate on December 17, 1925, and received commission the same day)	—	—	Coolidge	elevation
20	James William McCarthy	1872–1939	1928–1929 (Note: Recess appointment; formally nominated on December 6, 1928, confirmed by the Senate on January 8, 1929, and received commission the same day)	—	—	Coolidge	resignation
21	Guy Leverne Fake	1879–1957	1929–1951	1948–1951	1951–1957	Coolidge	death
22	John Boyd Avis	1875–1944	1929–1944	—	—	Hoover	death
23	Phillip Forman	1895–1978	1932–1959	1951–1959	—	Hoover	elevation
24	Thomas Glynn Walker	1899–1993	1939–1941 (Note: Recess appointment; formally nominated on January 16, 1940, confirmed by the Senate on March 5, 1940, and received commission on March 13, 1940)	—	—	F. Roosevelt	resignation
25	William Francis Smith	1903–1968	1941–1961	1959–1961	—	F. Roosevelt	elevation
26	Thomas Francis Meaney	1888–1968	1942–1966	—	1966–1968	F. Roosevelt	death
27	Thomas M. Madden	1907–1976	1945–1968	1961–1968	1968–1976	Truman	death
28	Alfred Egidio Modarelli	1898–1957	1951–1957	—	—	Truman	death
29	Richard Hartshorne	1888–1975	1951–1961	—	1961–1975	Truman	death
30	Reynier Wortendyke Jr.	1895–1975	1955–1970	—	1970–1975	Eisenhower	death
31	Mendon Morrill	1902–1961	1958–1961	—	—	Eisenhower	death
32	Arthur Stephen Lane	1910–1997	1960–1967	—	—	Eisenhower	resignation
33	Anthony Thomas Augelli	1902–1985	1961–1972	1968–1972	1972–1974	Kennedy	resignation
34	James Aloysius Coolahan	1903–1986	1962–1974	1972–1973	1974–1986	Kennedy	death
35	Robert Shaw	1907–1972	1962–1972	—	—	Kennedy	death
36	Mitchell Harry Cohen	1904–1991	1962–1974	1973–1974	1974–1991	Kennedy	death
37	Lawrence Whipple	1910–1983	1967–1978	1974–1978	1978–1983	L. Johnson	death
38	George Herbert Barlow	1921–1979	1969–1979	1978–1979	—	Nixon	death
39	Leonard I. Garth	1921–2016	1969–1973	—	—	Nixon	elevation
40	Clarkson Sherman Fisher	1921–1997	1970–1987	1979–1987	1987–1997	Nixon	death
41	John Joseph Kitchen	1911–1973	1970–1973	—	—	Nixon	death
42	Frederick Bernard Lacey	1920–2017	1971–1986	—	—	Nixon	retirement
43	Vincent P. Biunno	1916–1991	1973–1982	—	1982–1991	Nixon	death
44	Herbert Jay Stern	1936–present	1973–1987	—	—	Nixon	resignation
45	Henry Curtis Meanor	1929–2008	1974–1983	—	—	Nixon	resignation
46	John F. Gerry	1925–1995	1974–1994	1987–1994	1994–1995	Ford	death
47	Stanley Brotman	1924–2014	1975–1990	—	1990–2014	Ford	death
48	Harold Arnold Ackerman	1928–2009	1979–1994	—	1994–2009	Carter	death
49	Dickinson Debevoise	1924–2015	1979–1994	—	1994–2015	Carter	death
50	H. Lee Sarokin	1928–2023	1979–1994	—	—	Carter	elevation
52	John Winslow Bissell	1940–present	1982–2005	2001–2005	—	Reagan	retirement
53	Maryanne Trump Barry	1937–2023	1983–1999	—	—	Reagan	elevation
55	Robert Cowen	1930–present	1985–1987	—	—	Reagan	elevation
56	Garrett Brown Jr.	1943–present	1985–2012	2005–2012	2012	Reagan	retirement
57	Alfred James Lechner Jr.	1948–present	1986–2001	—	—	Reagan	resignation
58	Nicholas H. Politan	1935–2012	1987–2002	—	—	Reagan	retirement
59	Alfred M. Wolin	1932–present	1987–2000	—	2000–2004	Reagan	retirement
60	John C. Lifland	1933–present	1988–2001	—	2001–2007	Reagan	retirement
61	William G. Bassler	1938–present	1991–2005	—	2005–2006	G.H.W. Bush	retirement
63	Joseph Eron Irenas	1940–2015	1992–2002	—	2002–2015	G.H.W. Bush	death
64	Jerome B. Simandle	1949–2019	1992–2017	2012–2017	2017–2019	G.H.W. Bush	death
65	William H. Walls	1932–2019	1994–2005	—	2005–2019	Clinton	death
66	Stephen Orlofsky	1944–present	1995–2003	—	—	Clinton	resignation
67	Joseph A. Greenaway Jr.	1957–present	1996–2010	—	—	Clinton	elevation
69	Faith S. Hochberg	1950–present	1999–2015	—	—	Clinton	retirement
70	Joel A. Pisano	1949–2021	2000–2015	—	—	Clinton	retirement
71	Dennis M. Cavanaugh	1947–present	2000–2014	—	—	Clinton	retirement
73	Jose L. Linares	1953–present	2002–2019	2017–2019	—	G.W. Bush	retirement
75	Robert B. Kugler	1950–present	2002–2018	—	2018–2024	G.W. Bush	retirement
76	Freda L. Wolfson	1954–present	2002–2023	2019–2023	—	G.W. Bush	retirement
78	Noel Lawrence Hillman	1956–present	2006–2022	—	2022–2024	G.W. Bush	retirement
86	John Michael Vazquez	1970–present	2016–2023	—	—	Obama	resignation

== Chief judges ==
Chief judges have administrative responsibilities with respect to their district court. Unlike the Supreme Court, where one justice is specifically nominated to be chief, the office of chief judge rotates among the district court judges. To be chief, a judge must have been in active service on the court for at least one year, be under the age of 65, and have not previously served as chief judge.

A vacancy is filled by the judge highest in seniority among the group of qualified judges. The chief judge serves for a term of seven years, or until age 70, whichever occurs first. The age restrictions are waived if no members of the court would otherwise be qualified for the position.

When the office was created in 1948, the chief judge was the longest-serving judge who had not elected to retire, on what has since 1958 been known as senior status, or declined to serve as chief judge. After August 6, 1959, judges could not become or remain chief after turning 70 years old. The current rules have been in operation since October 1, 1982.

== Succession of seats ==
Seat 1
Seat established on September 24, 1789 by 1 Stat. 73
Brearley	1789–1790
Morris	1790–1801
Seat abolished on February 13, 1801 by 2 Stat. 89
Seat reestablished on March 8, 1802 by 2 Stat. 132
Morris	1802–1815
Pennington	1816–1826
Rossell	1826–1840
M. Dickerson	1840–1841
P. Dickerson	1841–1862
Field	1863–1870
Nixon	1870–1889
Green	1890–1896
Kirkpatrick	1896–1904
Lanning	1904–1909
Rellstab	1909–1928
McCarthy	1928–1929
Fake	1929–1951
Hartshorne	1951–1961
Cohen	1962–1974
Brotman	1975–1990
Bassler	1991–2005
Hillman	2006–2022
Farbiarz	2023–present

Seat 2
Seat established on March 3, 1905 by 33 Stat. 987
Cross	1905–1913
Haight	1914–1919
Lynch	1919–1925
Clark	1925–1938
Walker	1939–1941
Meaney	1942–1966
Whipple	1967–1978
Sarokin	1979–1994
Hayden	1997–2010
Salas	2011–present

Seat 3
Seat established on April 11, 1916 by 39 Stat. 48
Davis	1916–1920
Bodine	1920–1929
Avis	1929–1944
Madden	1945–1968
Garth	1969–1973
Stern	1973–1987
Politan	1987–2002
Wolfson	2002–2023
Kirsch	2023–present

Seat 4
Seat established on September 14, 1922 by 42 Stat. 837 (temporary)
Runyon	1923–1931
Seat made permanent on May 10, 1932 by 47 Stat. 161
Forman	1932–1959
Lane	1960–1967
Barlow	1969–1979
Ackerman	1979–1994
Walls	1994–2005
Bumb	2006–present

Seat 5
Seat established on March 24, 1940 by 54 Stat. 219 (temporary)
Seat made permanent on December 22, 1944 by 58 Stat. 887
Smith	1941–1961
Shaw	1962–1972
Biunno	1973–1982
Bissell	1982–2005
Wigenton	2006–present

Seat 6
Seat established on August 3, 1949 by 63 Stat. 493
Modarelli	1951–1957
Morrill	1958–1961
Coolahan	1962–1974
Gerry	1974–1994
Greenaway, Jr.	1996–2010
Cecchi	2011–present

Seat 7
Seat established on February 10, 1954 by 68 Stat. 8
Wortendyke, Jr.	1955–1970
Fisher	1970–1987
Lifland	1988–2001
Martini	2002–2015
Neals	2021–present

Seat 8
Seat established on May 19, 1961 by 75 Stat. 80
Augelli	1961–1972
Seat abolished on April 1, 1972 (temporary judgeship expired)

Seat 9
Seat established on June 2, 1970 by 84 Stat. 294
Kitchen	1970–1973
Meanor	1974–1983
Barry	1983–1999
Pisano	2000–2015
Vazquez	2016–2023
Semper	2023–present

Seat 10
Seat established on June 2, 1970 by 84 Stat. 294 (temporary)
Seat became permanent upon the abolition of Seat 8 on April 1, 1972
Lacey	1971–1986
Lechner, Jr.	1986–2001
Linares	2002–2019
Castner	2022–present

Seat 11
Seat established on October 20, 1978 by 92 Stat. 1629
Debevoise	1979–1994
Orlofsky	1995–2003
Sheridan	2006–2018
Quraishi	2021–present

Seat 12
Seat established on October 20, 1978 by 92 Stat. 1629
Thompson	1979–2001
Chesler	2002–2015
Martinotti	2016–present

Seat 13
Seat established on July 10, 1984 by 98 Stat. 333
Rodriguez	1985–1998
Hochberg	1999–2015
Padin	2022–present

Seat 14
Seat established on July 10, 1984 by 98 Stat. 333
Cowen	1985–1987
Wolin	1987–2000
Cavanaugh	2000–2014
Arleo	2014–present

Seat 15
Seat established on July 10, 1984 by 98 Stat. 333
Brown, Jr.	1985–2012
McNulty	2012–2023
Kiel	2024–present

Seat 16
Seat established on December 1, 1990 by 104 Stat. 5089
Cooper	1992–2011
Shipp	2012–present

Seat 17
Seat established on December 1, 1990 by 104 Stat. 5089
Irenas	1992–2002
Kugler	2002–2018
O'Hearn	2021–present

Seat 18
Seat established on December 1, 1990 by 104 Stat. 5089
Simandle	1992–2017
Williams	2021–present

== See also ==
- Courts of New Jersey
- List of current United States district judges
- List of United States federal courthouses in New Jersey
