= Joseph Lamb Bodine =

American judge (1883–1950)

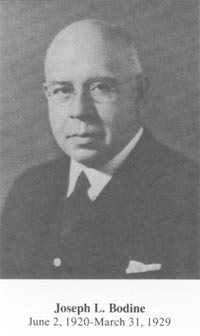

Judge of the United States District Court for the District of New Jersey
- In office June 2, 1920 – March 31, 1929
- Appointed by: Woodrow Wilson
- Preceded by: John Warren Davis
- Succeeded by: John Boyd Avis

Personal details
- Born: Joseph Lamb Bodine; November 6, 1883 Trenton, New Jersey
- Died: June 10, 1950 (aged 66) Trenton, New Jersey
- Education: Princeton University (A.B.); Harvard Law School (LL.B.)

Joseph Lamb Bodine (November 6, 1883 – June 10, 1950) was a United States district judge of the United States District Court for the District of New Jersey.

== Education and career ==
Born in Trenton, New Jersey, Bodine received an Artium Baccalaureus degree from Princeton University in 1905 and a Bachelor of Laws from Harvard Law School in 1908. He was in private practice in Trenton from 1908 to 1919. He was United States Attorney for the District of New Jersey from 1919 to 1920.

== Federal judicial service ==
On May 28, 1920, Bodine was nominated by President Woodrow Wilson to a seat on the United States District Court for the District of New Jersey vacated by Judge John Warren Davis. Bodine was confirmed by the United States Senate on June 2, 1920, and received his commission the same day. Bodine served in that capacity until his resignation on March 31, 1929.

== Later career and death ==
Following his resignation from the federal bench, Bodine took a seat as an associate justice of the New Jersey Supreme Court from 1929 to 1948. He died in Trenton on June 10, 1950.

== Sources ==
Legal offices
| Preceded by Charles Francis Lynch | United States Attorney for the District of New Jersey; 1919–1920 | Succeeded by Elmer H. Geran |
| Preceded by John Warren Davis | Judge of the United States District Court for the District of New Jersey; 1920–1929 | Succeeded by John Boyd Avis |
