= Richard Hartshorne (judge) =

American judge (1888–1975)

Senior Judge of the United States District Court for the District of New Jersey
- In office October 29, 1961 – September 14, 1975

Judge of the United States District Court for the District of New Jersey
- In office October 20, 1951 – October 29, 1961
- Appointed by: Harry S. Truman
- Preceded by: Guy Leverne Fake
- Succeeded by: Mitchell Harry Cohen

Personal details
- Born: Richard Hartshorne; February 29, 1888 Newark, New Jersey, U.S.
- Died: September 14, 1975 (aged 87)
- Education: Princeton University (Litt. B.); Columbia Law School (LL.B.)

Richard Hartshorne (February 29, 1888 – September 14, 1975) was a United States district judge of the United States District Court for the District of New Jersey.

== Education and career ==
Born in Newark, New Jersey, Hartshorne received a Bachelor of Letters from Princeton University in 1909 and a Bachelor of Laws from Columbia Law School in 1912. He was in private practice in New Jersey from 1912 to 1931, also serving in the United States Naval Reserve as a Lieutenant, J.G., during World War I, and as a Special Assistant to the United States Attorney for the District of New Jersey in 1925. He was a Judge of the County Court in Newark from 1931 to 1951, and during that time was President of the New Jersey Interstate Commission on Crime from 1935 to 1943.

== Federal judicial service ==
On October 17, 1951, Hartshorne was nominated by President Harry S. Truman to a seat on the United States District Court for the District of New Jersey vacated by Judge Guy Leverne Fake. Hartshorne was confirmed by the United States Senate on October 19, 1951, and received his commission on October 20, 1951. He assumed senior status on October 29, 1961. Hartshorne served in that capacity until his death on September 14, 1975.

== Sources ==
Legal offices
Preceded by Guy Leverne Fake	Judge of the United States District Court for the District of New Jersey; 1951–1961	Succeeded by Mitchell Harry Cohen
