= John Boyd Avis =

American judge

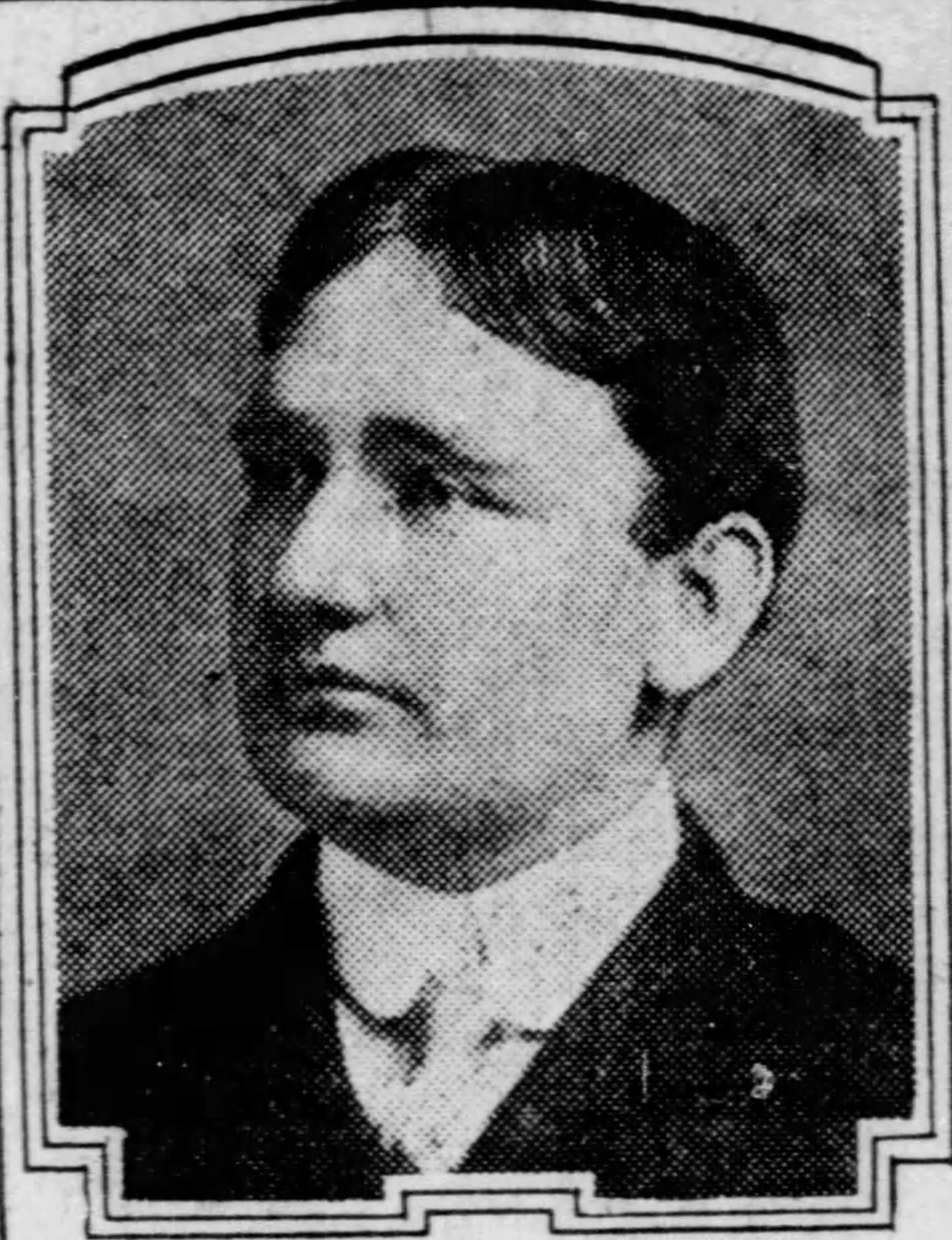

Judge of the United States District Court for the District of New Jersey
- In office October 2, 1929 – January 21, 1944
- Appointed by: Herbert Hoover
- Preceded by: Joseph Lamb Bodine
- Succeeded by: Thomas M. Madden

Member of the New Jersey Senate from Gloucester County
- In office 1906–1909
- Preceded by: Thomas M. Ferrell
- Succeeded by: George W. F. Gaunt

Personal details
- Born: John Boyd Avis; July 11, 1875 Deerfield, New Jersey, U.S.
- Died: January 21, 1944 (aged 68)
- Party: Republican
- Education: read law

John Boyd Avis (July 11, 1875 – January 21, 1944) was an American attorney, jurist, and Republican Party politician who represented Gloucester County, New Jersey in both houses of the New Jersey legislature and served as a United States district judge of the United States District Court for the District of New Jersey. He was a leading figure in South Jersey politics before his fifteen-year federal judicial service.

== Early life and education ==
John Boyd Avis was born in Deerfield, New Jersey on July 11, 1875, to John H. and Sarah (née Barker) Davis. His father was a member of the New Jersey General Assembly in 1881, the state game warden for Gloucester County from 1903 to 1924, and the great-grandson of Joseph Avis, a revolutionary who had survived the winter at Valley Forge. John Boyd Avis attended public schools in Deerfield.

== Legal career ==
After moving to Gloucester County, Avis read law from 1890 to 1894 with John S. Mitchell and from 1897 to 1898 with David Ogden Watkins, the former acting governor of New Jersey, in Woodbury. He was admitted to the bar in February 1898 and opened an office in Woodbury. In 1900, he and Watkins became partners. The partnership lasted until its dissolution in 1907, after which Avis practiced alone until his appointment to the bench in 1929. He served as municipal attorney to a number of Gloucester County towns and townships.

== Political career ==
Avis became a member of the Gloucester County Republican Committee soon after his admission to the bar and served one year as county chair.

In 1901, Avis was elected to the New Jersey General Assembly. He was re-elected in 1902, 1903, and 1904, a relatively long tenure for the time. In 1904, he was elected speaker of the Assembly; he was elected to a second term as speaker in 1905, which was also rare for his time.

He was elected to the New Jersey Senate in 1905, serving one term from 1906 to 1908. As senator, he was a member of the leading committees and driving force behind the act establishing county tax equalization boards. The act empowered the governor to appoint non-partisan boards throughout the state to equalize tax rates.

In 1912, he was chosen as a delegate to the 1912 Republican National Convention in Chicago, representing New Jersey's 1st congressional district. He supported Theodore Roosevelt.

== Federal judicial service ==
Avis was nominated by President Herbert Hoover on September 9, 1929, to a seat on the United States District Court for the District of New Jersey vacated by Judge Joseph Lamb Bodine, who had joined the New Jersey Supreme Court. He was confirmed by the United States Senate on October 2, 1929, and received his commission the same day. His chambers were located in Camden, New Jersey.

=== Notable cases ===
Among Avis's most notable cases was the sentencing of Skinny D'Amato's guilty plea, and ruling on the authorship of the Old 97 ballad, a decision eventually reversed by the United States Court of Appeals for the Third Circuit.

In 1934, Avis ruled in favor of the Furniture Workers' Industrial Union, denying a motion for preliminary restraint against their picketing of the Miller Parlor Furniture Company plant in Jersey City. Avis ruled that the Norris–LaGuardia Act was applicable to the situation, holding that "a labor dispute may arise by reason of the desire of a labor organization to unionize any factor in its line of business" and that a federal court could not interfere with the union's efforts to publicize any unionization drive not involving fraud or violence, which were not indicated in the record. The ruling was considered a landmark victory by labor lawyers.

In 1939, he oversaw and approved the terms of the bankruptcy of film producer William Fox.

== Personal life and death ==
Avis married Minnie Genung Anderson on September 27, 1899, in Asbury Park, New Jersey. He died on January 21, 1944, after an illness of two months.

He was a member of the local YMCA and various fraternal organizations, including the Junior Order of United American Mechanics, the Freemasons, the Loyal Order of Moose, the Improved Order of Red Men, the Grange, the Odd Fellows, and the Foresters of America.

== Sources ==
Legal offices
| Preceded by Joseph Lamb Bodine | Judge of the United States District Court for the District of New Jersey; 1929–1944 | Succeeded by Thomas M. Madden |
