= Michael E. Farbiarz =

American judge (born 1973)

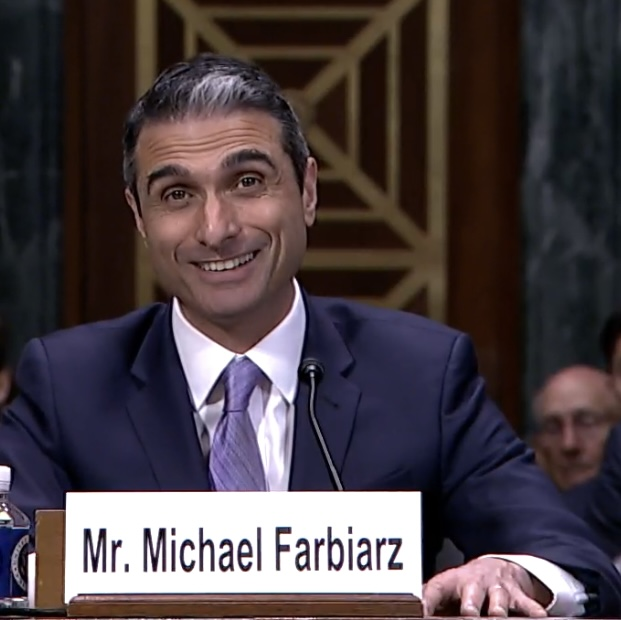
- Farbiarz in January 2023

Judge of the United States District Court for the District of New Jersey
- Incumbent
- Assumed office May 5, 2023
- Appointed by: Joe Biden
- Preceded by: Noel Lawrence Hillman

Personal details
- Born: Michael Etan Farbiarz; 1973 (age 52–53) New York City, New York, U.S.
- Education: Harvard University (BA); Yale University (JD)

Michael Etan Farbiarz (born 1973) is an American lawyer from New Jersey who is a United States district judge of the United States District Court for the District of New Jersey.

== Education ==
Farbiarz received a Bachelor of Arts from Harvard University in 1995 and a Juris Doctor from Yale Law School in 1999.

== Career ==
After graduating from law school, he served as a law clerk for then-Chief Judge Michael Mukasey of the United States District Court for the Southern District of New York from 1999 to 2000 and for Judge José A. Cabranes of the United States Court of Appeals for the Second Circuit from 2000 to 2001. From 2001 to 2004, Farbiarz was an associate at Davis Polk & Wardwell in New York City. From 2004 to 2014, he served as an assistant United States attorney in the U.S. Attorney's Office for the Southern District of New York, including as co-chief of the terrorism and international narcotics unit from 2010 to 2014. From 2014 to 2016, Farbiarz was a senior fellow at the New York University School of Law. From 2016 to 2023, he served as general counsel of the Port Authority of New York and New Jersey. He has taught courses at Columbia Law School and New York University School of Law.

=== Notable cases as a federal prosecutor ===
In 2001, Farbiarz prosecuted Mokhtar Haouari, who was convicted of conspiracy in a plot to bomb Los Angeles International Airport shortly before New Year's Day 2000.

In 2009, Farbiarz prosecuted Somali pirates, including Abduwali Muse, who had seized the American container ship Maersk Alabama in the Indian Ocean. The incident was portrayed in the 2013 film Captain Phillips.

In 2010, Farbiarz was the lead prosecutor of eleven deep-cover Russian agents. Anna Chapman, a Russian living in New York, was one of the eleven prosecuted and was charged as a spy.

=== Federal judicial service ===
Farbiarz was recommended by Senator Cory Booker. On December 22, 2022, during Joe Biden's presidency, Biden announced his intention to nominate Farbiarz as a United States district judge for the United States District Court for the District of New Jersey. On January 3, 2023, his nomination was sent to the Senate. Farbiarz was nominated to fill the seat vacated by Judge Noel Lawrence Hillman, who assumed senior status on April 4, 2022. A hearing on his nomination was held before the Senate Judiciary Committee on January 25, 2023. On April 20, 2023, the committee reported his nomination favorably by a 17–4 vote. On May 2, 2023, the United States Senate invoked cloture on his nomination by a 65–34 vote, and was confirmed later that day by the same margin. He received his judicial commission on May 5, 2023.

==== Notable cases as a judge ====
On March 19, 2025, Farbiarz was assigned to preside over the habeas corpus case of Columbia University student Mahmoud Khalil, whom the United States government is seeking to deport on the grounds that the Secretary of State Marco Rubio deems him a serious threat to American foreign policy.

Legal offices
Preceded by Noel Lawrence Hillman	Judge of the United States District Court for the District of New Jersey; 2023–present	Incumbent
