= Stanley Brotman =

American judge (1924–2014)

Stanley Seymour Brotman
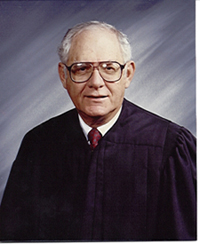

Judge of the United States Foreign Intelligence Surveillance Court
- In office July 17, 1997 – May 18, 2004
- Appointed by: William Rehnquist
- Preceded by: Ralph Gordon Thompson
- Succeeded by: Frederick Scullin

Senior Judge of the United States District Court for the District of New Jersey
- In office April 23, 1990 – February 21, 2014

Judge of the United States District Court for the District of New Jersey
- In office March 14, 1975 – April 23, 1990
- Appointed by: Gerald Ford
- Preceded by: Mitchell Harry Cohen
- Succeeded by: William G. Bassler

Personal details
- Born: Stanley Seymour Brotman; July 27, 1924 Vineland, New Jersey, U.S.
- Died: February 21, 2014 (aged 89) Stratford, New Jersey, U.S.
- Education: Yale University (BA); Harvard University (LLB)

Stanley Seymour Brotman (July 27, 1924 – February 21, 2014) was a United States district judge of the United States District Court for the District of New Jersey.

== Education and career ==
Brotman was born in Vineland, New Jersey. He grew up in the nearby community of Brotmanville, which had been established by his grandfather, a Russian immigrant, in Pittsgrove Township. Brotman left Yale University to serve in the United States Army during World War II, from 1942 to 1945. He returned to Yale and received a Bachelor of Arts degree in Eastern Studies in 1947. He received a Bachelor of Laws from Harvard Law School in 1951. He served again during the Korean War from 1951 to 1952 as a first lieutenant in the Armed Forces Security Agency. He was in private practice in Vineland from 1952 to 1975.

== Federal judicial service ==
On January 27, 1975, Brotman was nominated by President Gerald Ford to a seat on the United States District Court for the District of New Jersey vacated by Judge Mitchell Harry Cohen. Brotman was confirmed by the United States Senate on March 13, 1975, and received his commission on March 14, 1975. He assumed senior status on April 23, 1990 and was succeeded by Judge William G. Bassler. Brotman served on the United States Foreign Intelligence Surveillance Court from May 1998 to May 2005. In addition to his duties in the District of New Jersey, Brotman served on temporary assignments to the United States District Court for the Virgin Islands for over twenty years and was designated by the United States Court of Appeals for the Third Circuit as the Acting Chief Judge of that court from December 22, 1989 to August 14, 1992. Brotman stopped hearing cases in September 2013, but remained a federal judge until his death.

== Death ==
A resident of Voorhees Township, New Jersey, Brotman died on February 21, 2014, at the age of 89, at a hospital in Stratford, New Jersey.

== See also ==
- List of Jewish American jurists

== Sources ==
Legal offices
Preceded by Mitchell Harry Cohen	Judge of the United States District Court for the District of New Jersey; 1975–1990	Succeeded by William G. Bassler
Preceded by Ralph Gordon Thompson	Judge of the United States Foreign Intelligence Surveillance Court; 1997–2004	Succeeded by Frederick Scullin
