= John Winslow Bissell =

American judge (born 1940)

John W. Bissell
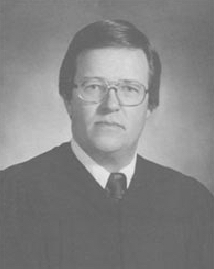

Chief Judge of the United States District Court for the District of New Jersey
- In office 2001–2005
- Preceded by: Anne Elise Thompson
- Succeeded by: Garrett Brown Jr.

Judge of the United States District Court for the District of New Jersey
- In office December 10, 1982 – September 1, 2005
- Appointed by: Ronald Reagan
- Preceded by: Vincent P. Biunno
- Succeeded by: Susan D. Wigenton

Personal details
- Born: John Winslow Bissell; June 7, 1940 (age 85) Exeter, New Hampshire, U.S.
- Education: Princeton University (AB); University of Virginia (LLB)

John Winslow Bissell (born June 7, 1940) is a former United States district judge of the United States District Court for the District of New Jersey.

== Education and career ==
Born in Exeter, New Hampshire, Bissell graduated from Phillips Exeter Academy in 1958 and received his Artium Baccalaureus degree in history from Princeton University in 1962. He then went on to earn a Bachelor of Laws from the University of Virginia School of Law in 1965. Following graduation from law school, Bissell served as law clerk to Judge Arthur Stephen Lane of the United States District Court for the District of New Jersey from 1965 to 1966.

After his clerkship, Bissell entered private practice in Morristown, New Jersey from 1966 to 1969 before serving as an Assistant United States Attorney of the United States Attorney's Office for the District of New Jersey from 1969 to 1971. He then returned to private practice from 1972 to 1978 before serving as Judge in the Essex County, New Jersey District Court from 1978 to 1981, and of the Superior Court of New Jersey from 1981 to 1982.

== Federal judicial service ==
On November 23, 1982, President Ronald Reagan nominated Bissell to serve on the United States District Court for the District of New Jersey, to a seat vacated by Judge Vincent P. Biunno. He was confirmed by the United States Senate on December 10, 1982 and received his commission the same day. He served as Chief Judge from 2001 to 2005. He retired on September 1, 2005, and returned to private practice, joining Connell Foley.

== Sources ==
Legal offices
Preceded by Vincent P. Biunno	Judge of the United States District Court for the District of New Jersey; 1982–2005	Succeeded by Susan D. Wigenton
Preceded by Anne Elise Thompson	Chief Judge of the United States District Court for the District of New Jersey; 2001–2005	Succeeded by Garrett Brown Jr.
