= William G. Bassler =

American judge (born 1938)

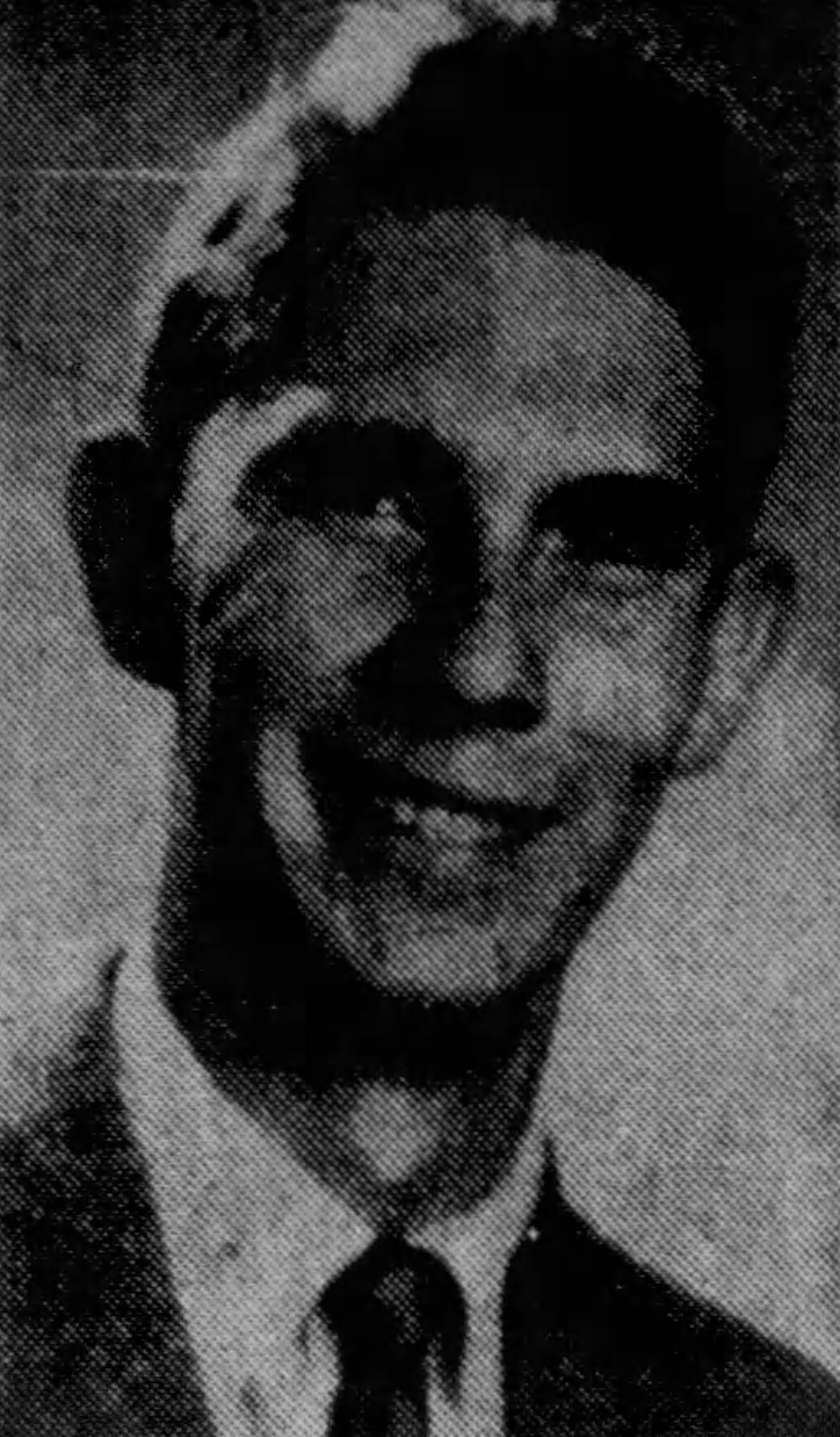

Senior Judge of the United States District Court for the District of New Jersey
- In office March 6, 2005 – August 31, 2006

Judge of the United States District Court for the District of New Jersey
- In office September 16, 1991 – March 6, 2005
- Appointed by: George H. W. Bush
- Preceded by: Stanley Brotman
- Succeeded by: Noel Lawrence Hillman

Personal details
- Born: William G. Bassler; March 6, 1938 (age 88) Butler, Pennsylvania
- Education: Fordham University (BA); Georgetown University Law Center (JD); New York University School of Law (LLM); University of Virginia School of Law (LLM)

William G. Bassler (born March 6, 1938) is a former United States district judge of the United States District Court for the District of New Jersey, serving from 1991 until 2006. He is currently an adjunct professor at Fordham Law School in New York City and works as an arbitrator and mediator in New Jersey and New York City.

== Early life and career ==
Bassler was born in Butler, Pennsylvania. He attended Fordham University (Bachelor of Arts 1960), Georgetown University Law Center (Juris Doctor 1963), New York University School of Law (Master of Laws 1969), and University of Virginia Law School (Judicial Process Master of Laws 1995). After finishing law school, Bassler clerked for Judge Mark Sullivan of the Appellate Division of the New Jersey Superior Court.

Since 1964 and until his first judicial appointment in 1988 he was an attorney in private practice at a succession of small New Jersey firms. He was initially an associate and then a partner in the law firm of Parsons, Canzona, Blair & Warren. He then became a name partner in Labrecque, Parsons & Bassler. In 1983, he joined Evans, Koelzer, Osborne, Kreizman & Bassler, and from 1984 until his ascension to the bench he was a partner in Carton, Nary, Witt & Arvanitis. Bassler's practice was primarily civil and confined to New Jersey state courts.

== Judicial service ==
Bassler was appointed to the New Jersey Superior Court in 1988 by then-governor Thomas Kean (Republican). Shortly thereafter he was nominated to be a United States District Judge of the United States District Court for the District of New Jersey by then-president George H. W. Bush on June 14, 1991. He received a "qualified" recommendation from the American Bar Association. Bassler was confirmed by the Senate on September 12, 1991, and took his commission on September 16, 1991, replacing Judge Stanley Brotman. Bassler assumed senior status on March 6, 2005, and retired shortly after on August 31, 2006.

Besides penning several hundred judicial opinions from the bench, Bassler also authored published articles on legal topics, including some as a federal judge in the 1990s.

== Sources ==
- Judge Bassler's Website
- Speech by Sen. Lautenberg (D-NJ) in support of the nomination in the U.S. Senate, September 12, 1991.

Legal offices
Preceded by Stanley Brotman	Judge of the United States District Court for the District of New Jersey; 1991–2005	Succeeded by Noel Lawrence Hillman
