= Garrett Brown Jr. =

American judge (born 1943)

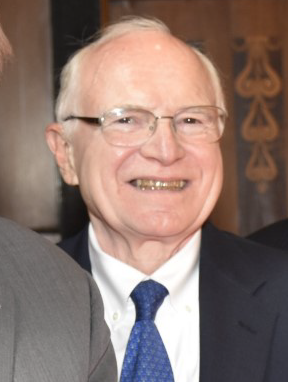

Senior Judge of the United States District Court for the District of New Jersey
- In office January 2, 2012 – January 26, 2012

Chief Judge of the United States District Court for the District of New Jersey
- In office 2005–2012
- Preceded by: John Winslow Bissell
- Succeeded by: Jerome B. Simandle

Judge of the United States District Court for the District of New Jersey
- In office December 17, 1985 – January 2, 2012
- Appointed by: Ronald Reagan
- Preceded by: Seat established by 98 Stat. 333
- Succeeded by: Kevin McNulty

Personal details
- Born: Garrett E. Brown Jr. March 20, 1943 (age 83) Orange, New Jersey
- Education: Lafayette College (A.B.); Duke University School of Law (J.D.)

Garrett E. Brown Jr. (born March 20, 1943) is a former United States District Judge and later the Chief Judge of the United States District Court for the District of New Jersey.

== Education and career ==
Born in Orange, New Jersey, Brown received a Bachelor of Arts degree from Lafayette College in 1965 and a Juris Doctor from Duke University School of Law in 1968. He was a law clerk to Vincent S. Haneman of the Supreme Court of New Jersey from 1968 to 1969. After clerking, Brown became an Assistant United States Attorney at the United States Attorney's Office for the District of New Jersey (1969–1973) before leaving to work in private practice. He worked in private practice in Newark, New Jersey from 1973 to 1981. He left private practice in 1981 to be Chief Counsel for the United States Government Printing Office. He served in that role until 1983, when he became the Chief Counsel for the United States Maritime Administration for the next two years. From 1985 to 1986, Brown served as the Acting Deputy Maritime Administrator in the United States Maritime Administration.

== Federal judicial service ==
On October 23, 1985, President Ronald Reagan nominated Brown to a new seat on the United States District Court for the District of New Jersey created by 98 Stat. 333. Brown was confirmed by the United States Senate on December 16, 1985, and received his commission on December 17, 1985. He was a member of the Judicial Conference of the United States from 2005 to 2008. He became Chief Judge in 2005 and served in that capacity until he assumed senior status on January 2, 2012. He retired on January 26, 2012.

== Sources ==
Legal offices
Preceded by Seat established by 98 Stat. 333	Judge of the United States District Court for the District of New Jersey; 1985–2012	Succeeded by Kevin McNulty
Preceded by John Winslow Bissell	Chief Judge of the United States District Court for the District of New Jersey; 2005–2012	Succeeded by Jerome B. Simandle
