= James William McCarthy =

American judge

Judge of the United States District Court for the District of New Jersey
- In office October 6, 1928 – January 31, 1929
- Appointed by: Calvin Coolidge
- Preceded by: John Rellstab
- Succeeded by: Guy Leverne Fake

Personal details
- Born: James William McCarthy; September 8, 1872 Jersey City, New Jersey, U.S.
- Died: June 28, 1939 (aged 66)
- Education: New York Law School (LL.B.)

James William McCarthy (September 8, 1872 – June 28, 1939) was a United States district judge of the United States District Court for the District of New Jersey.

== Education and career ==
Born in Jersey City, New Jersey, McCarthy received a Bachelor of Laws from New York Law School in 1898. He was in private practice in New York City, New York from 1898 to 1900, and in Jersey City beginning in 1900. He was an Alderman for Jersey City from 1905 to 1908. He was a member of the New Jersey State Board of Finance from 1906 to 1907. He was a Judge of the Jersey City Second Criminal Court from 1907 to 1908. He was an assistant county prosecutor for Hudson County, New Jersey from 1908 to 1918. He was a Judge of the New Jersey Court for Hudson County from 1918 to 1923. He was Counsel for the New Jersey Bridge and Tunnel Commission (now the Port Authority of New York and New Jersey) from 1924 to 1928. He was the United States Attorney for the District of New Jersey from 1928 to 1928.

== Federal judicial service ==
McCarthy was nominated to the United States District Court for the District of New Jersey by President Coolidge on March 18, 1925. He was confirmed by the United States Senate on March 18, 1925, but declined the appointment.

McCarthy received a recess appointment from President Calvin Coolidge on October 6, 1928, to a seat on the United States District Court for the District of New Jersey vacated by Judge John Rellstab. He was nominated to the same position by President Coolidge on December 6, 1928. He was confirmed by the United States Senate on January 8, 1929, and received his commission the same day. His service terminated on January 31, 1929, due to his resignation due to poor health.

== Sources ==
Legal offices
Preceded by John Rellstab	Judge of the United States District Court for the District of New Jersey; 1928–1929	Succeeded by Guy Leverne Fake
