= Anne Elise Thompson =

American judge (born 1934)

Senior Judge of the United States District Court for the District of New Jersey
- Incumbent
- Assumed office June 1, 2001

Chief Judge of the United States District Court for the District of New Jersey
- In office 1994–2001
- Preceded by: John F. Gerry
- Succeeded by: John Winslow Bissell

Judge of the United States District Court for the District of New Jersey
- In office November 2, 1979 – June 1, 2001
- Appointed by: Jimmy Carter
- Preceded by: Seat established by 92 Stat. 1629
- Succeeded by: Stanley R. Chesler

County Prosecutor of Mercer County, New Jersey
- In office 1975–1979

Judge of the Trenton Municipal Court
- In office 1972–1975

Municipal Prosecutor of the Lawrence Township
- In office 1970–1972

Personal details
- Born: Anne Elise Jenkins; July 8, 1934 (age 92) Philadelphia, Pennsylvania, U.S.
- Spouse: William H. Thompson
- Education: Howard University (BA, LLB); Temple University (MA)

Anne Elise Thompson (née Jenkins; born July 8, 1934) is an inactive senior United States district judge of the United States District Court for the District of New Jersey. She was the first female and first African American federal judge in New Jersey.

== Early life ==
Anne is the daughter of Leroy H. Jenkins and Mary E. Jackson. Her father was a dentist and her mother was originally from Wilson, North Carolina, which was a town of strict segregation, but also was said to be "the bright leaf tobacco market for the East".

== Education and career ==
Thompson was born in Philadelphia. She received a Bachelor of Arts degree from Howard University in 1955, a Master of Arts from Temple University in 1957, and a Bachelor of Laws from Howard University School of Law in 1964. She was an attorney in the Office of the Solicitor of the United States Department of Labor in Chicago from 1964 to 1965. She was a grant writer for United Progress, Inc. from 1966 to 1967. She became an assistant deputy public defender for the New Jersey Office of the Public Defender in the Mercer-Somerset-Hunterdon Region of Trenton, New Jersey from 1967 to 1970. She was the Municipal Prosecutor for Lawrence Township in Lawrenceville, New Jersey from 1970 to 1972. She was a municipal court judge for the City of Trenton, New Jersey from 1972 to 1975. She was a prosecutor for Mercer County, New Jersey from 1975 to 1979.

=== Federal judicial service ===
On September 28, 1979, Thompson was nominated by President Jimmy Carter to a new seat on the United States District Court for the District of New Jersey created by 92 Stat. 1629. She was confirmed by the United States Senate on October 31, 1979, and received her commission on November 2, 1979. Judge Thompson was the first woman to serve as a federal district court judge in the state of New Jersey. She was also the first African American federal judge to serve in the state of New Jersey. She served as Chief Judge from 1994 to 2001, and assumed senior status on June 1, 2001. She took inactive senior status on May 20, 2022.

== See also ==
- List of African-American federal judges
- List of African-American jurists
- List of first women lawyers and judges in New Jersey
- List of United States federal judges by longevity of service

== Sources ==
Legal offices
Preceded by Seat established by 92 Stat. 1629	Judge of the United States District Court for the District of New Jersey; 1979–2001	Succeeded by Stanley R. Chesler
Preceded by John F. Gerry	Chief Judge of the United States District Court for the District of New Jersey; 1994–2001	Succeeded by John Winslow Bissell
