= Stanley R. Chesler =

American judge (born 1947)

Stanley Richard Chesler

Senior Judge of the United States District Court for the District of New Jersey
- Incumbent
- Assumed office June 15, 2015

Judge of the United States District Court for the District of New Jersey
- In office December 4, 2002 – June 15, 2015
- Appointed by: George W. Bush
- Preceded by: Anne Elise Thompson
- Succeeded by: Brian R. Martinotti

Magistrate Judge of the United States District Court for the District of New Jersey
- In office 1987–2002

Personal details
- Born: Stanley Richard Chesler; June 15, 1947 (age 79) Brooklyn, New York, U.S.
- Education: Binghamton University (BA); St. John's University (JD)

Stanley Richard Chesler (born June 15, 1947) is a senior United States district judge of the United States District Court for the District of New Jersey.

== Education and career ==
Chesler graduated from Harpur College, now Binghamton University, in 1968, with a Bachelor of Arts degree, and St. John's University School of Law in 1974 with a Juris Doctor. He was an assistant district attorney in The Bronx from 1974–80, a federal prosecutor at the U.S. Attorney's Office for the District of New Jersey from 1980 to 1987, and a United States magistrate judge in New Jersey from 1987 until his appointment as a district judge.

=== Federal judicial service ===
Chelser was nominated by President George W. Bush on January 23, 2002, to a seat vacated by Judge Anne Elise Thompson and was confirmed by the United States Senate on November 14, 2002. Chesler received his commission on December 4, 2002 and was sworn in thereafter. He assumed senior status on June 15, 2015.

Magistrate Stanley R. Chesler's federal bench was being filled not long after in July 2016 by Judge Brian Martinotti.

=== Notable case ===
The class action lawsuit settlement SULLIVAN, vs. DB Investments is being administered in Chesler's court, and as of April 8, 2013, payout of the $107 million settlement to some 500,000 claimants is pending Chesler's signature.

== Sources ==
Legal offices
Preceded by Anne Elise Thompson	Judge of the United States District Court for the District of New Jersey; 2002–2015	Succeeded by Brian R. Martinotti
