= Mitchell Harry Cohen =

United States district judge

Senior Judge of the United States District Court for the District of New Jersey
- In office September 11, 1974 – January 7, 1991

Chief Judge of the United States District Court for the District of New Jersey
- In office 1973–1974
- Preceded by: James Aloysius Coolahan
- Succeeded by: Lawrence Aloysius Whipple

Judge of the United States District Court for the District of New Jersey
- In office August 2, 1962 – September 11, 1974
- Appointed by: John F. Kennedy
- Preceded by: Richard Hartshorne
- Succeeded by: Stanley Brotman

Personal details
- Born: Mitchell Harry Cohen; September 11, 1904 Philadelphia, Pennsylvania, U.S.
- Died: January 7, 1991 (aged 86) Philadelphia, Pennsylvania, U.S.
- Education: Dickinson School of Law (LL.B.)

Mitchell Harry Cohen (September 11, 1904 – January 7, 1991) was a United States district judge of the United States District Court for the District of New Jersey.

== Education and career ==
Born in Philadelphia, Pennsylvania, Cohen received a Bachelor of Laws from Dickinson School of Law (now Penn State Dickinson Law) in 1928. He was in private practice in Camden, New Jersey from 1930 to 1958. He was also an annual solicitor for the Camden City Welfare Board in 1936, a Camden city prosecutor from 1936 to 1942, a member of the Camden County Board of Chosen Freeholders in 1940, and a Judge of the Camden City Municipal Court from 1942 to 1947. He served in the United States Army during World War II, and was thereafter prosecutor for Camden County, New Jersey from 1948 to 1958. Cohen was a Judge of the Camden County Court from 1958 to 1961, and of the New Jersey Superior Court from 1961 to 1962.

== Federal judicial service ==
On July 6, 1962, Cohen was nominated by President John F. Kennedy to a seat on the United States District Court for the District of New Jersey vacated by Judge Richard Hartshorne. Cohen was confirmed by the United States Senate on August 1, 1962, and received his commission on August 2, 1962. He served as Chief Judge from 1973 to 1974, assuming senior status on September 11, 1974. Cohen served in that capacity until his death, on January 7, 1991, in Philadelphia.

== Honor ==
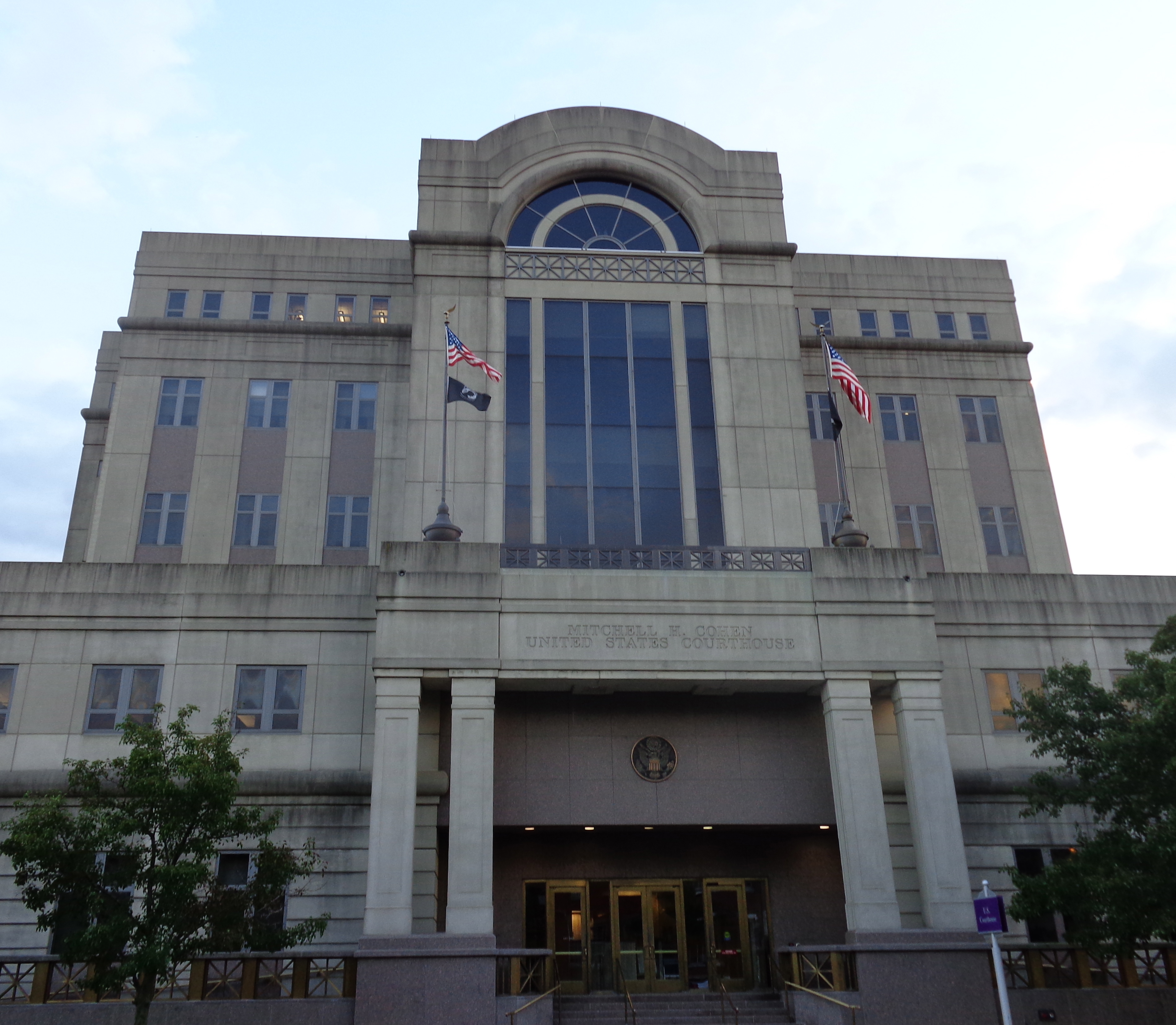
Mitchell H. Cohen United States Courthouse

The Mitchell H. Cohen United States Courthouse in Camden was dedicated in 1994.

== Sources ==
Legal offices
| Preceded by Richard Hartshorne | Judge of the United States District Court for the District of New Jersey; 1962–1974 | Succeeded by Stanley Brotman |
| Preceded by James Aloysius Coolahan | Chief Judge of the United States District Court for the District of New Jersey; 1973–1974 | Succeeded by Lawrence Aloysius Whipple |
