= John F. Gerry =

American judge (1925–1995)

John Francis Gerry

Senior Judge of the United States District Court for the District of New Jersey
- In office October 1, 1994 – March 10, 1995

Chief Judge of the United States District Court for the District of New Jersey
- In office 1987–1994
- Preceded by: Clarkson Sherman Fisher
- Succeeded by: Anne Elise Thompson

Judge of the United States District Court for the District of New Jersey
- In office December 20, 1974 – October 1, 1994
- Appointed by: Gerald Ford
- Preceded by: James Aloysius Coolahan
- Succeeded by: Joseph A. Greenaway Jr.

Personal details
- Born: John Francis Gerry; November 17, 1925 Camden, New Jersey, U.S.
- Died: March 10, 1995 (aged 69) Moorestown Township, New Jersey, U.S.
- Education: Princeton University (A.B.); Harvard Law School (LL.B.)

John Francis Gerry (November 17, 1925 – March 10, 1995) was a United States district judge of the United States District Court for the District of New Jersey.

== Education and career ==
Born in Camden, New Jersey, Gerry received an Artium Baccalaureus degree, magna cum laude, from Princeton University in 1950. He received a Bachelor of Laws, magna cum laude, from Harvard Law School in 1953. He was in the United States Army Air Corps from 1944 to 1946. He was in private practice of law with the firm of Wallace, Douglass & Gerry in Camden from 1953 to 1972. He was a judge of the Camden County Court from 1972 to 1973. He was a judge to the Superior Court of New Jersey from 1973 to 1975.

== Federal judicial service ==
Gerry was nominated by President Gerald Ford on November 18, 1974, to a seat on the United States District Court for the District of New Jersey vacated by Judge James Aloysius Coolahan. He was confirmed by the United States Senate on December 18, 1974, and received his commission on December 20, 1974. He served as Chief Judge from 1987 to 1994. He was a member of the Judicial Conference of the United States from 1990 to 1994 and chairman of the executive committee of the conference from 1992 to 1994. He assumed senior status on October 1, 1994. His service was terminated on March 10, 1995, due to his death of liver cancer in his home in Moorestown Township, New Jersey.

Legal offices
Preceded by James Aloysius Coolahan	Judge of the United States District Court for the District of New Jersey; 1974–1994	Succeeded by Joseph A. Greenaway Jr.
Preceded by Clarkson Sherman Fisher	Chief Judge of the United States District Court for the District of New Jersey; 1987–1994	Succeeded by Anne Elise Thompson
