= Jennifer Mascott =

American judge (born 1976)

Jenn Mascott
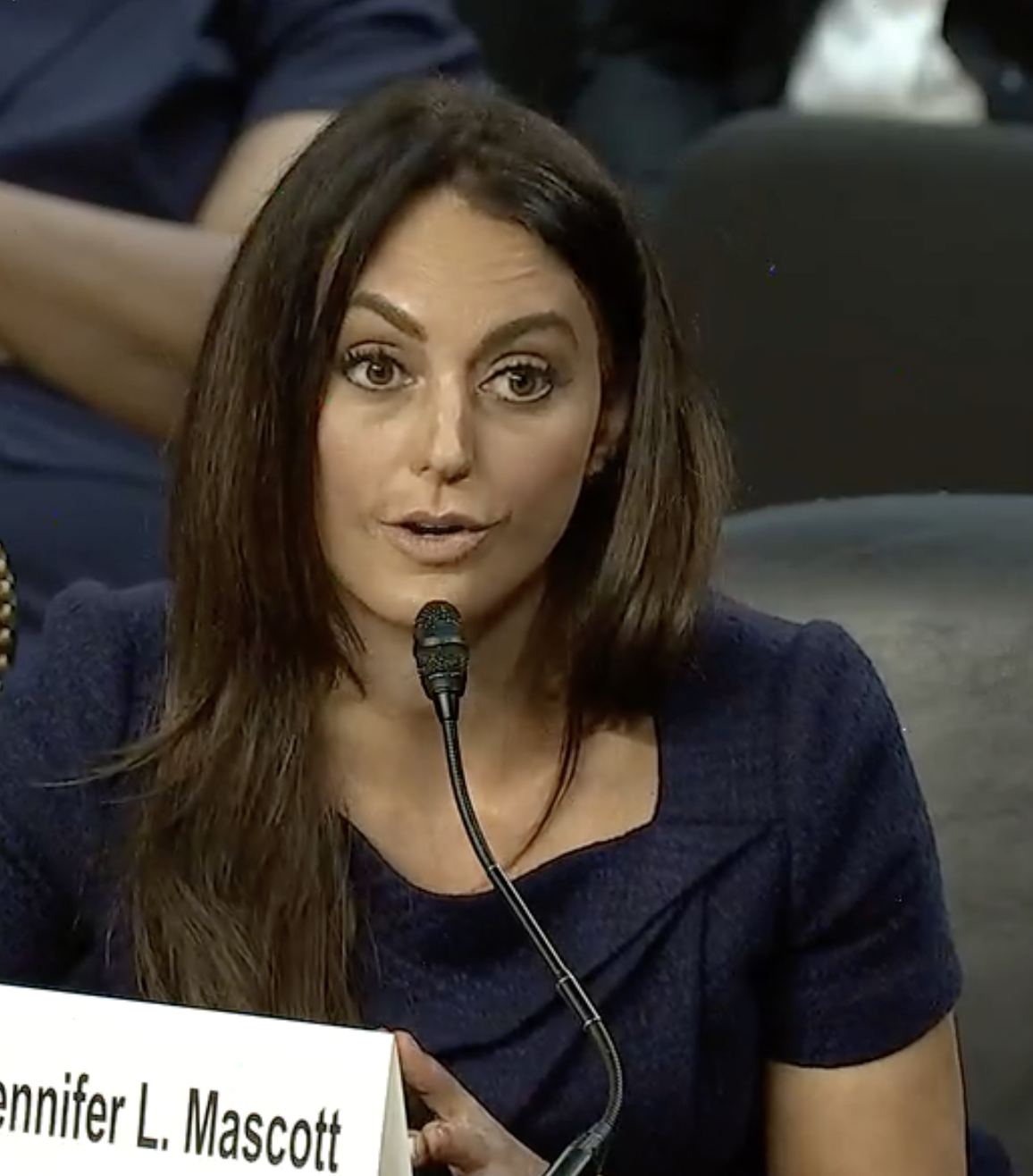

Judge of the United States Court of Appeals for the Third Circuit
- Incumbent
- Assumed office October 10, 2025
- Appointed by: Donald Trump
- Preceded by: Kent A. Jordan

Personal details
- Born: Jennifer Lee Miller; 1976 (age 49–50) Westminster, Maryland, U.S.
- Education: University of Maryland, College Park (BS); George Washington University (JD)

Jennifer Lee "Jenn" Mascott (née Miller; born 1976) is an American lawyer and jurist serving as a United States circuit judge of the United States Court of Appeals for the Third Circuit. Prior to her judicial appointment, Mascott was a law professor whose research focused on separation of powers and litigation. She taught at the Columbus School of Law of Catholic University of America (2025), the Antonin Scalia Law School of George Mason University (2017–2024), and the George Washington University Law School (2011–2017).

== Early life and education ==
Mascott was born Jennifer Lee Miller in 1976 in Westminster, Maryland. She graduated from the University of Maryland, College Park with a Bachelor of Science.

Prior to entering law school she worked in communications and legislative roles for Representative Eric Cantor of Virginia and to Representative Anne Northup of Kentucky. She graduated from the George Washington University Law School in 2006, where she was a senior editor of the George Washington Law Review.

== Career ==
After law school, Mascott was a law clerk to Brett Kavanaugh of the United States Court of Appeals for the District of Columbia Circuit from 2006 to 2007 and Justice Clarence Thomas of the United States Supreme Court from 2008 to 2009. From 2011 to 2013 and 2015 to 2017, she was a lecturer at George Washington University Law School and from 2015 to 2017 was an Olin/Searle Fellow at Georgetown University Law Center. From 2017 to 2024, she was an assistant professor of law at the Antonin Scalia Law School of George Mason University. From 2017 to 2019, Mascott worked in private practice.

During the first presidency of Donald Trump, Mascott served as deputy assistant attorney general in the Office of Legal Counsel and later as associate deputy attorney general in the United States Department of Justice. In 2021, Mascott returned to work as an assistant professor of law at the Antonin Scalia Law School at George Mason University, where she worked until 2024. Mascott inherited ownership of Adfero, a public relations firm, in 2023 following her husband's death.

She served in the White House Counsel's Office in the second Trump presidency. She served as an associate professor of law at the Catholic Law School from 2024 to 2025.

=== Federal judicial service ===
On July 16, 2025, President Donald Trump announced his intention to nominate Mascott to a seat on the United States Court of Appeals for the Third Circuit vacated by Kent A. Jordan. On September 3, 2025, she testified before the United States Senate Judiciary Committee. On October 1, 2025, her nomination was reported from the Senate Judiciary Committee by a 12–10 party-line vote. On October 9, 2025, Mascott's nomination was confirmed by a 50–47 vote.

Following her judicial appointment, Mascott continued to work in the leadership of public relations firm Adfero until it went out of business in June 2026.

== Personal life ==
Mascott was married to Jeff Mascott, who died of pancreatic cancer in February 2023 at the age of 48.

== Selected scholarly works ==
- Mascott, Jennifer L. (2018). "Who Are 'Officers of the United States'?" (PDF). Stanford Law Review. 70 (3): 443–564.
- — (2018). "Gundy v. United States: Reflections on the Court and the State of the Nondelegation Doctrine". George Mason Law Review. 26 (1): 1–25.
- — (2019). "Early Customs Laws and Delegations" (PDF). George Washington Law Review. 87 (6): 1388–1450.

== See also ==
- List of law clerks for the tenth seat of the Supreme Court of the United States

Legal offices
Preceded by Kent A. Jordan	Judge of the United States Court of Appeals for the Third Circuit; 2025–present	Incumbent
