= Theodore McKee =

American judge (born 1947)

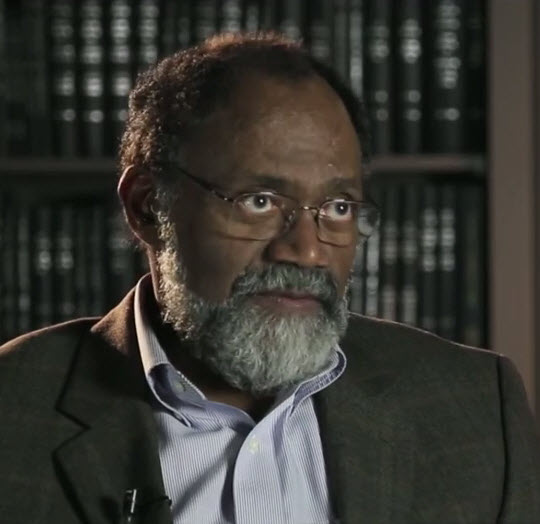

Senior Judge of the United States Court of Appeals for the Third Circuit
- Incumbent
- Assumed office October 20, 2022

Chief Judge of the United States Court of Appeals for the Third Circuit
- In office May 6, 2010 – October 1, 2016
- Preceded by: Anthony Joseph Scirica
- Succeeded by: D. Brooks Smith

Judge of the United States Court of Appeals for the Third Circuit
- In office June 9, 1994 – October 20, 2022
- Appointed by: Bill Clinton
- Preceded by: A. Leon Higginbotham Jr.
- Succeeded by: Arianna J. Freeman

Personal details
- Born: Theodore Alexander McKee; June 5, 1947 (age 78); Rochester, New York, U.S.
- Education: State University of New York, Cortland (BA); Syracuse University (JD)

Theodore Alexander McKee (born June 5, 1947, in Rochester, New York) is a Senior United States circuit judge of the United States Court of Appeals for the Third Circuit. He previously served on the Philadelphia Court of Common Pleas in the First Judicial District of Pennsylvania.

== Education ==
McKee received a Bachelor of Arts degree from the State University of New York at Cortland in 1969 and earned his Juris Doctor from Syracuse University College of Law where he was an honor student graduating in 1975 magna cum laude and as a member of the Order of the Coif and the Justinian Honor Society.

== Legal career ==
McKee was in private practice in Philadelphia, Pennsylvania from 1975 to 1977. From 1977 to 1980 he served as an Assistant United States Attorney in the Eastern District of Pennsylvania. He began in the General Crimes Unit, moved to the Narcotics and Firearms Unit, and finally worked in the Political Corruption Unit. In his first year as an AUSA, McKee investigated allegations of police brutality before a special grand jury, as part of a nationwide probe into police brutality by the United States Civil Rights Commission.

In 1980, McKee became a Deputy City Solicitor in the Philadelphia City Solicitor's office, where he remained until 1983 when he became General Counsel for the Philadelphia Parking Authority.

From 1980 to 1991, McKee was a lecturer at Rutgers Law School.

== Judicial career ==
=== State court judicial career ===
In 1984, McKee was elected as a Judge on the Philadelphia Court of Common Pleas, where he served until 1994.

=== Federal judicial service ===
President Bill Clinton nominated Judge McKee to the United States Court of Appeals for the Third Circuit on March 22, 1994, to a seat vacated by Judge A. Leon Higginbotham Jr. McKee was confirmed by the United States Senate on June 8, 1994, and received his commission on June 9, 1994. He served as Chief Judge from May 6, 2010 to October 1, 2016.

In July 2018, McKee wrote for a unanimous panel when it upheld a Boyertown Area School District policy guaranteeing transgender students use of their preferred locker room.

In 2021, he announced that he is going to assume senior status after being on the federal bench for 27 years. He assumed senior status on October 20, 2022 when his successor received commission.

== Law reform work ==
McKee is an elected member of the American Law Institute and serves as an Adviser on ALI's project to revise the Sentencing provisions of the Model Penal Code.

== See also ==
- List of African-American federal judges
- List of African-American jurists

Legal offices
| Preceded by A. Leon Higginbotham, Jr. | Judge of the United States Court of Appeals for the Third Circuit; 1994–2022 | Succeeded by Arianna J. Freeman |
| Preceded by Anthony Joseph Scirica | Chief Judge of the United States Court of Appeals for the Third Circuit; 2010–2016 | Succeeded by D. Brooks Smith |
