= United States Court of Appeals for the Third Circuit =

Current United States federal appellate court

- (3d Cir.)

- Location: James A. Byrne U.S. Courthouse (Philadelphia, Pennsylvania)
- Appeals from: District of Delaware; District of New Jersey; Eastern District of Pennsylvania; Middle District of Pennsylvania; Western District of Pennsylvania; District of the Virgin Islands
- Established: June 16, 1891
- Judges: 14
- Circuit Justice: Samuel Alito
- Chief Judge: Michael Chagares
- www.ca3.uscourts.gov

The United States Court of Appeals for the Third Circuit (in case citations, 3d Cir.) is a federal court with appellate jurisdiction over the district courts for the following districts:

- District of Delaware
- District of New Jersey
- Eastern District of Pennsylvania
- Middle District of Pennsylvania
- Western District of Pennsylvania

This circuit also hears appeals from the District Court of the Virgin Islands, which is an Article IV territorial court and not a district court under Article III of the Constitution.

The court is composed of 14 active judges and is based at the James A. Byrne United States Courthouse in Philadelphia, Pennsylvania. The court also conducts sittings in other venues, including the United States Virgin Islands. It is one of 13 United States courts of appeals. Due to the court's appellate jurisdiction over Delaware, where more than half of publicly traded companies in the United States incorporate, the court handles a significant number of influential commercial cases in the United States.

== Current composition of the court ==
As of October 9, 2025:

#	Title	Judge	Duty station	Born	Term of service			Appointed by
#	Title	Judge	Duty station	Born	Active	Chief	Senior	Appointed by
61	Chief Judge	Michael Chagares	Newark, NJ	1962	2006–present	2021–present	—	G.W. Bush
63	Circuit Judge	Thomas Hardiman	Pittsburgh, PA	1965	2007–present	—	—	G.W. Bush
66	Circuit Judge	Patty Shwartz	Newark, NJ	1961	2013–present	—	—	Obama
67	Circuit Judge	Cheryl Ann Krause	Philadelphia, PA	1968	2014–present	—	—	Obama
68	Circuit Judge	L. Felipe Restrepo	Philadelphia, PA	1959	2016–present	—	—	Obama
69	Circuit Judge	Stephanos Bibas	Philadelphia, PA	1969	2017–present	—	—	Trump
70	Circuit Judge	David J. Porter	Pittsburgh, PA	1966	2018–present	—	—	Trump
71	Circuit Judge	Paul Matey	Newark, NJ	1971	2019–present	—	—	Trump
72	Circuit Judge	Peter J. Phipps	Pittsburgh, PA	1973	2019–present	—	—	Trump
73	Circuit Judge	Arianna J. Freeman	Philadelphia, PA	1978	2022–present	—	—	Biden
74	Circuit Judge	T. Montgomery-Reeves	Wilmington, DE	1981	2023–present	—	—	Biden
75	Circuit Judge	Cindy K. Chung	Pittsburgh, PA	1975	2023–present	—	—	Biden
76	Circuit Judge	Emil Bove	Newark, NJ	1981	2025–present	—	—	Trump
77	Circuit Judge	Jennifer Mascott	Wilmington, DE	1976	2025–present	—	—	Trump
45	Senior Judge	Anthony Joseph Scirica	Philadelphia, PA	1940	1987–2013	2003–2010	2013–present	Reagan
46	Senior Judge	Robert Cowen	inactive	1930	1987–1998	—	1998–present	Reagan
47	Senior Judge	Richard Lowell Nygaard	Erie, PA	1940	1988–2005	—	2005–present	Reagan
49	Senior Judge	Jane Richards Roth	Wilmington, DE	1935	1991–2006	—	2006–present	G.H.W. Bush
51	Senior Judge	Theodore McKee	Philadelphia, PA	1947	1994–2022	2010–2016	2022–present	Clinton
53	Senior Judge	Marjorie Rendell	Philadelphia, PA	1947	1997–2015	—	2015–present	Clinton
55	Senior Judge	Thomas L. Ambro	Wilmington, DE	1949	2000–2023	—	2023–present	Clinton
56	Senior Judge	Julio M. Fuentes	inactive	1946	2000–2016	—	2016–present	Clinton
57	Senior Judge	D. Brooks Smith	Duncansville, PA	1951	2002–2021	2016–2021	2021–present	G.W. Bush
59	Senior Judge	D. Michael Fisher	Pittsburgh, PA	1944	2003–2017	—	2017–present	G.W. Bush

== List of former judges ==
#	Judge	State	Born–died	Active service	Chief Judge	Senior status	Appointed by	Reason for termination
1	Marcus Wilson Acheson	PA	1828–1906	1891–1906 (Note: Acheson was appointed as a circuit judge for the Third Circuit in 1891 by Benjamin Harrison. The Judiciary Act of 1891 reassigned his seat to what is now the U.S. Court of Appeals for the Third Circuit.)	—	—	B. Harrison / Operation of law	death
2	George M. Dallas	PA	1839–1917	1892–1909	—	—	B. Harrison	retirement
3	George Gray	DE	1840–1925	1899–1914	—	—	McKinley	retirement
4	Joseph Buffington	PA	1855–1947	1906–1938	—	1938–1947	T. Roosevelt	death
5	William M. Lanning	NJ	1849–1912	1909–1912	—	—	Taft	death
6	Robert W. Archbald	PA	1848–1926	1911–1913	—	—		removal
7	John Bayard McPherson	PA	1846–1919	1912–1919	—	—	Taft	death
8	Victor Baynard Woolley	DE	1867–1945	1914–1938	—	1938–1945	Wilson	death
9	Thomas Griffith Haight	NJ	1879–1942	1919–1920	—	—	Wilson	resignation
10	John Warren Davis	NJ	1867–1945	1920–1939	—	1939–1941	Wilson	resignation
11	Joseph Whitaker Thompson	PA	1861–1946	1931–1938	—	1938–1946	Hoover	death
12	John Biggs Jr.	DE	1895–1979	1937–1965	1948–1965	1965–1979	F. Roosevelt	death
13	Albert Branson Maris	PA	1893–1989	1938–1958	—	1958–1989	F. Roosevelt	death
14	William Clark	NJ	1891–1957	1938–1943	—	—	F. Roosevelt	resignation
15	Francis Biddle	PA	1886–1968	1939–1940	—	—	F. Roosevelt	resignation
16	Charles Alvin Jones	PA	1887–1966	1939–1944	—	—	F. Roosevelt	resignation
17	Herbert Funk Goodrich	PA	1889–1962	1940–1962	—	—	F. Roosevelt	death
18	Gerald McLaughlin	NJ	1893–1977	1943–1968	—	1968–1977	F. Roosevelt	death
19	John Joseph O'Connell	PA	1894–1949	1945–1949	—	—	Truman	death
20	Harry Ellis Kalodner	PA	1896–1977	1946–1969	1965–1966	1969–1977	Truman	death
21	William H. Hastie	VI	1904–1976	1949–1971	1968–1971	1971–1976	Truman	death
22	Austin Leander Staley	PA	1902–1978	1950–1967	1966–1967	1967–1978	Truman	death
23	Phillip Forman	NJ	1895–1978	1959–1961	—	1961–1978	Eisenhower	death
24	James Cullen Ganey	PA	1899–1972	1961–1966	—	1966–1972	Kennedy	death
25	William Francis Smith	NJ	1903–1968	1961–1968	—	—	Kennedy	death
26	Abraham Lincoln Freedman	PA	1904–1971	1964–1971	—	—	L. Johnson	death
27	Collins J. Seitz	DE	1914–1998	1966–1989	1971–1984	1989–1998	L. Johnson	death
28	Francis Lund Van Dusen	PA	1912–1993	1967–1977	—	1977–1993	L. Johnson	death
29	Ruggero J. Aldisert	PA	1919–2014	1968–1986	1984–1986	1986–2014	L. Johnson	death
30	David Henry Stahl	PA	1920–1970	1968–1970	—	—	L. Johnson	death
31	Arlin M. Adams	PA	1921–2015	1969–1987	—	—	Nixon	retirement
32	John Joseph Gibbons	NJ	1924–2018	1969–1990	1987–1990	—	Nixon	retirement
33	Max Rosenn	PA	1910–2006	1970–1981	—	1981–2006	Nixon	death
34	James Rosen	NJ	1909–1972	1971–1972	—	—	Nixon	death
35	James Hunter III	NJ	1916–1989	1971–1986	—	1986–1989	Nixon	death
36	Joseph F. Weis Jr.	PA	1923–2014	1973–1988	—	1988–2014	Nixon	death
37	Leonard I. Garth	NJ	1921–2016	1973–1986	—	1986–2016	Nixon	death
38	A. Leon Higginbotham Jr.	PA	1928–1998	1977–1991	1990–1991	1991–1993	Carter	retirement
39	Dolores Sloviter	PA	1932–2022	1979–2013	1991–1998	2013–2022	Carter	death
40	Edward R. Becker	PA	1933–2006	1981–2003	1998–2003	2003–2006	Reagan	death
41	Carol Los Mansmann	PA	1942–2002	1985–2002	—	—	Reagan	death
42	Walter King Stapleton	DE	1934–2024	1985–1999	—	1999–2024	Reagan	death
43	Morton Ira Greenberg	NJ	1933–2021	1987–2000	—	2000–2021	Reagan	death
44	William D. Hutchinson	PA	1932–1995	1987–1995	—	—	Reagan	death
48	Samuel Alito	NJ	1950–present	1990–2006	—	—	G.H.W. Bush	elevation
50	Timothy K. Lewis	PA	1954–present	1992–1999	—	—	G.H.W. Bush	resignation
52	H. Lee Sarokin	NJ	1928–2023	1994–1996	—	—	Clinton	retirement
54	Maryanne Trump Barry	NJ	1937–2023	1999–2011	—	2011–2019	Clinton	retirement
58	Michael Chertoff	NJ	1953–present	2003–2005	—	—	G.W. Bush	resignation
60	Franklin Van Antwerpen	PA	1941–2016	2004–2006	—	2006–2016	G.W. Bush	death
62	Kent A. Jordan	DE	1957–present	2006–2025	—	—	G.W. Bush	retirement
64	Joseph A. Greenaway Jr.	NJ	1957–present	2010–2023	—	—	Obama	retirement
65	Thomas I. Vanaskie	PA	1953–present	2010–2018	—	2018–2019	Obama	retirement

== Chief judges ==
Chief judges
Biggs Jr.	1948–1965
Kalodner	1965–1966
Staley	1966–1967
Hastie	1968–1971
Seitz	1971–1984
Aldisert	1984–1986
Gibbons	1987–1990
Higginbotham	1990–1991
Sloviter	1991–1998
Becker	1998–2003
Scirica	2003–2010
McKee	2010–2016
D. Smith	2016–2021
Chagares	2021–present

Chief judges have administrative responsibilities with respect to their circuits, and preside over any panel on which they serve, unless the circuit justice (the Supreme Court justice responsible for the circuit) is also on the panel. Unlike the Supreme Court, where one justice is specifically nominated to be chief, the office of chief judge rotates among the circuit judges.

To be chief, a judge must have been in active service on the court for at least one year, be under the age of 65, and have not previously served as chief judge. A vacancy is filled by the judge highest in seniority among the group of qualified judges, with seniority determined first by commission date, then by age. The chief judge serves for a term of seven years, or until age 70, whichever occurs first. If no judge qualifies to be chief, the youngest judge over the age of 65 who has served on the court for at least one year shall act as chief until another judge qualifies. If no judge has served on the court for more than a year, the most senior judge shall act as chief. Judges can forfeit or resign their chief judgeship or acting chief judgeship while retaining their active status as a circuit judge.

When the office was created in 1948, the chief judge was the longest-serving judge who had not elected to retire, on what has since 1958 been known as senior status, or declined to serve as chief judge. After August 6, 1959, judges could not become or remain chief after turning 70 years old. The current rules have been in operation since October 1, 1982.

== Succession of seats ==
The court has fourteen seats for active judges, numbered in the order in which they were initially filled. Judges who assume senior status enter a kind of retirement in which they remain on the bench but vacate their seats, thus allowing the U.S. President to appoint new judges to fill their seats.

Seat 1
Established on December 10, 1869 by the Judiciary Act of 1869 as a circuit judgeship for the Third Circuit
Reassigned on June 16, 1891 to the newly formed United States Circuit Court of Appeals for the Third Circuit by the Judiciary Act of 1891
Acheson	PA	1892–1906
Buffington	PA	1906–1938
Biddle	PA	1939–1940
Goodrich	PA	1940–1962
Freedman	PA	1964–1971
Weis, Jr.	PA	1973–1988
Nygaard	PA	1988–2005
Hardiman	PA	2007–present

Seat 2
Established on June 16, 1891 by the Judiciary Act of 1891
Dallas	PA	1892–1909
Lanning	NJ	1909–1912
McPherson	PA	1912–1919
Haight	NJ	1919–1920
Davis	NJ	1920–1939
Jones	PA	1939–1944
Kalodner	PA	1946–1969
Adams	PA	1969–1987
Hutchinson	PA	1987–1995
Rendell	PA	1997–2015
Bibas	PA	2017–present

Seat 3
Established on February 23, 1899 by 30 Stat. 846
Gray	DE	1899–1914
Woolley	DE	1914–1938
Maris	PA	1938–1958
Forman	NJ	1959–1961
W. Smith	NJ	1961–1968
Hunter III	NJ	1971–1986
Cowen	NJ	1987–1998
Fuentes	NJ	2000–2016
Matey	NJ	2019–present

Seat 4
Established on June 10, 1930 by 46 Stat. 538
Thompson	PA	1931–1938
Clark	NJ	1938–1943
McLaughlin	NJ	1943–1968
Gibbons	NJ	1969–1990
Alito	NJ	1990–2006
Greenaway, Jr.	NJ	2010–2023
Bove III	NJ	2025–present

Seat 5
Established as a temporary judgeship on June 24, 1936 by 49 Stat. 1903
Made permanent on May 31, 1938, by 52 Stat. 584
Biggs, Jr.	DE	1937–1965
Seitz	DE	1966–1989
Roth	DE	1991–2006
Jordan	DE	2006–2025
Mascott	DE	2025–present

Seat 6
Established on December 7, 1944, by 58 Stat. 796
O'Connell	PA	1945–1949
Staley	PA	1950–1967
Aldisert	PA	1968–1986
Scirica	PA	1987–2013
Restrepo	PA	2016–present

Seat 7
Established on August 3, 1949 by 63 Stat. 493
Hastie	VI	1950–1971
Rosen	NJ	1971–1972
Garth	NJ	1973–1986
Greenberg	NJ	1987–2000
Chertoff	NJ	2003–2005
Chagares	NJ	2006–present

Seat 8
Established on May 19, 1961 by 75 Stat. 80
Ganey	PA	1961–1966
Van Dusen	PA	1967–1977
Higginbotham, Jr.	PA	1977–1991
McKee	PA	1994–2022
Freeman	PA	2022–present

Seat 9
Established on June 18, 1968 by 82 Stat. 184
Stahl	PA	1968–1970
Rosenn	PA	1970–1981
Becker	PA	1981–2003
Van Antwerpen	PA	2004–2006
Vanaskie	PA	2010–2018
Phipps	PA	2019–present

Seat 10
Established on October 20, 1978 by 92 Stat. 1629
Sloviter	PA	1979–2013
Krause	PA	2014–present

Seat 11
Established on July 10, 1984 by 98 Stat. 333
Mansmann	PA	1985–2002
Fisher	PA	2003–2017
Porter	PA	2018–present

Seat 12
Established on July 10, 1984 by 98 Stat. 333
Stapleton	DE	1985–1999
Ambro	DE	2000–2023
Montgomery-Reeves	DE	2023–present

Seat 13
Established on December 1, 1990 by 104 Stat. 5089
Lewis	PA	1992–1999
D. Smith	PA	2002–2021
Chung	PA	2023–present

Seat 14
Established on December 1, 1990 by 104 Stat. 5089
Sarokin	NJ	1994–1996
Barry	NJ	1999–2011
Shwartz	NJ	2013–present

== See also ==
- Judicial appointment history for United States federal courts#Third Circuit
- List of current United States circuit judges
