= Robert Shaw (judge) =

American judge

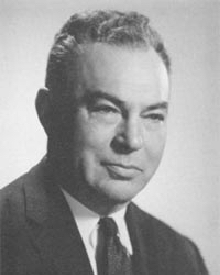

Judge of the United States District Court for the District of New Jersey
- In office April 12, 1962 – July 9, 1972
- Appointed by: John F. Kennedy
- Preceded by: William Francis Smith
- Succeeded by: Vincent P. Biunno

Personal details
- Born: Robert Shaw; May 22, 1907 Jersey City, New Jersey
- Died: July 9, 1972 (aged 65)
- Education: Rutgers Law School (LL.B.)

Robert Shaw (May 22, 1907 – July 9, 1972) was a United States district judge of the United States District Court for the District of New Jersey.

== Education and career ==
He was born in Jersey City, New Jersey and attended high school in Paterson. He received a Bachelor of Laws from the New Jersey Law School (now Rutgers Law School) in 1932. He was in private practice in Newark, New Jersey from 1935 to 1962. He was a member of the New Jersey General Assembly from 1937 to 1938. He was in the United States Army during World War II from 1943 to 1945 and was a private serving in the South Pacific. While in the army, he did his initial training as a medic at the Medical Replacement Training Center, Fort Pickett, Virginia. He was Mayor of Caldwell Township (now Fairfield Township), New Jersey from 1955 to 1961.

== Federal judicial service ==
On March 19, 1962, Shaw was nominated by President John F. Kennedy to a seat on the United States District Court for the District of New Jersey vacated by Judge William Francis Smith. Shaw was confirmed by the United States Senate on April 11, 1962, and received his commission on April 12, 1962. Shaw served in that capacity until his death on July 9, 1972.

== Sources ==
Legal offices
Preceded by William Francis Smith	Judge of the United States District Court for the District of New Jersey; 1962–1972	Succeeded by Vincent P. Biunno
