= John Biggs Jr. =

American judge (1895–1979)

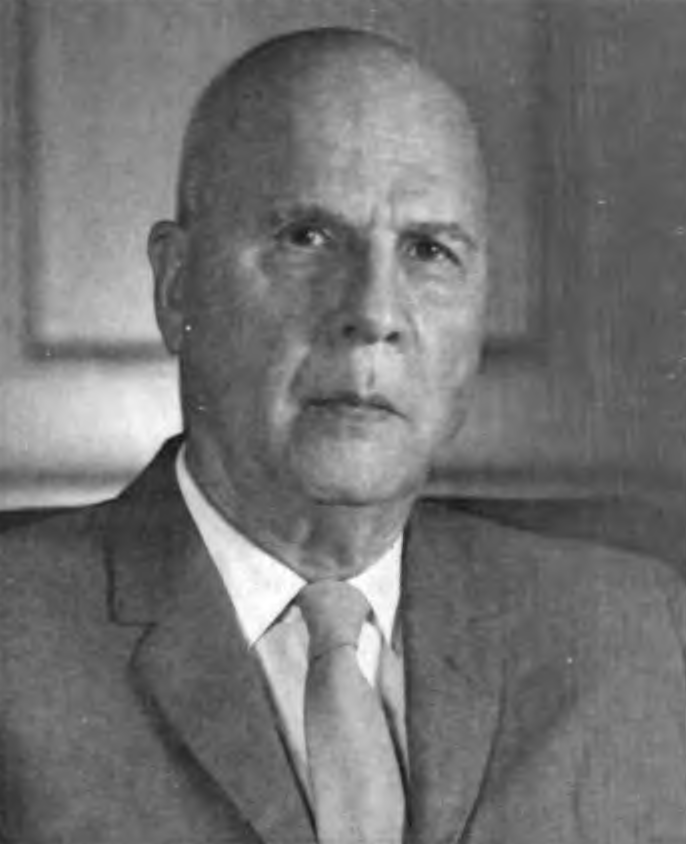

Senior Judge of the United States Court of Appeals for the Third Circuit
- In office October 30, 1965 – April 15, 1979

Chief Judge of the United States Court of Appeals for the Third Circuit
- In office 1948–1965
- Preceded by: Office established
- Succeeded by: Harry Ellis Kalodner

Judge of the United States Court of Appeals for the Third Circuit
- In office February 16, 1937 – October 30, 1965
- Appointed by: Franklin D. Roosevelt
- Preceded by: Seat established by 49 Stat. 1903
- Succeeded by: Collins J. Seitz

Personal details
- Born: John Biggs Jr. October 6, 1895 Wilmington, Delaware, U.S.
- Died: April 15, 1979 (aged 83) Wilmington, Delaware, U.S.
- Party: Democratic
- Children: John Biggs III, Charles R. Biggs, and Anna B. Pierce
- Education: Princeton University (LittB); Harvard University (LLB)

John Biggs Jr. (October 6, 1895 – April 15, 1979) was a United States circuit judge of the United States Court of Appeals for the Third Circuit.

== Early life and education ==
Biggs was born in Wilmington, Delaware, on October 6, 1895, to John and Rachel Valentine (Massey) Biggs. His father was the Attorney General of Delaware, since April 4, 1887, and the Chairman of the Constitutional Convention which framed the 1897 Constitution of Delaware, Biggs was also the grandson of Benjamin T. Biggs who served two terms in Congress. Biggs was a private in the United States Army Ordnance and Tank Corps during World War I from 1917 to 1918. He received a Bachelor of Letters from Princeton University in 1918, and a Bachelor of Laws from Harvard Law School in 1922. At Princeton Biggs was an editor of the Princeton Tiger and a Triangle Club collaborator.

While at Princeton, Biggs shared a room and became friends with writer F. Scott Fitzgerald, and later helped the author find a home in Delaware. It is reported that Biggs often retrieved Fitzgerald from jail, after Fitzgerald had bouts of drinking and fighting in Wilmington, Delaware. After Fitzgerald died in 1940, he was a mourner at his funeral and was the executor of the estate and the guardian of Fitzgerald's daughter Scottie, for whom he negotiated the contract rights of The Great Gatsby.

== Career ==
Biggs was in private practice in Wilmington from 1922 to 1937, serving as a civilian aide to the Secretary of War in Wilmington from 1923 to 1937, and as a Referee in Bankruptcy for the United States District Court for the District of Delaware from 1924 to 1932. He was the chairman of the Democratic State Convention in 1928, and he gave the nominating speech for President Roosevelt in 1932. He was narrowly defeated to become the Democratic candidate for the Attorney General of Delaware in the 1932 and 1936 elections.

Biggs had been a member of the bar since 1928, and was also a member of the Delaware State Bar Association, the Association of the Bar of the City of New York, the Society of Colonial Wars, the Sons of the American Revolution, and the American Legion.

== Federal judicial service ==
On February 3, 1937, Biggs was nominated by President Franklin D. Roosevelt to a new seat on the United States Court of Appeals for the Third Circuit created by 49 Stat. 1903. He was confirmed by the United States Senate on February 10, 1937, and received his commission on February 16, 1937. He served a member of the Conference of Senior Circuit Judges (now the Judicial Conference of the United States) from 1939 to 1948. He served as Chief Judge and as a member of the Judicial Conference of the United States from 1948 to 1965, assuming senior status on October 30, 1965, and serving in that capacity until his death on April 15, 1979, in Wooddale, Delaware.

During his time on the bench Biggs handled more than 4,000 cases, and wrote about 1,500 opinions which were rarely reversed by the Supreme Court. Important cases he was known for were he maintained that public schools were discriminatory and ordered the complete desegregation of Delaware's public schools and that the reading of the Bible in the schools were contrary to the Constitution.

== Recognition ==
Biggs was commended by Chief Justice Burger who stated that: "If there were some judicial counterpart of the Congressional Medal of Honor, you would lead my list for one of the first to be given." This belief was echoed by Chief Justice Warren who called him a, "...one-man Ministry of Justice."

During his lifetime, Biggs was elected to both the American Philosophical Society and the American Academy of Arts and Sciences.

== Published works ==
Biggs Jr Written Works
Published Date	Title	ISBN	Notes
1926	Demigods		
1928	Seven Days Whipping		
1933	Delaware Laws Affecting Business Corporations		Co-Authored by Stewart Lynch
1955	The Guilty Mind: Psychiatry and the Law of Homicide	9780608040776	Earned Biggs an honorary membership in the American College of Psychiatrists
	His Corkran on the Clam Stretch		Published in anthologies

== See also ==
- List of United States federal judges by longevity of service

== Sources ==
Legal offices
Preceded by Seat established by 49 Stat. 1903	Judge of the United States Court of Appeals for the Third Circuit; 1937–1965	Succeeded by Collins J. Seitz
Preceded by Office established	Chief Judge of the United States Court of Appeals for the Third Circuit; 1948–1965	Succeeded by Harry Ellis Kalodner
