= Madeline Cox Arleo =

American judge (born 1963)

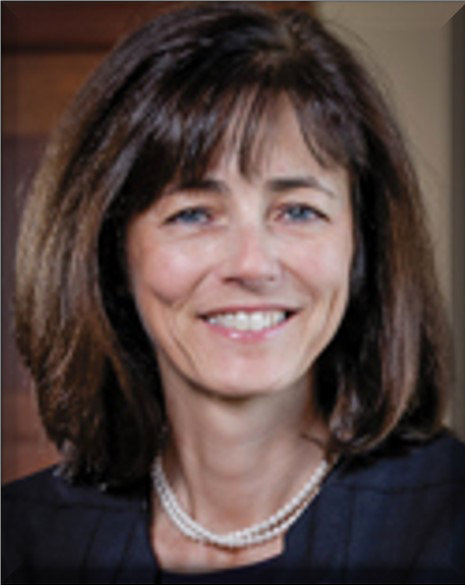

Judge of the United States District Court for the District of New Jersey
- Incumbent
- Assumed office November 21, 2014
- Appointed by: Barack Obama
- Preceded by: Dennis M. Cavanaugh

Magistrate Judge of the United States District Court for the District of New Jersey
- In office 2000 – November 21, 2014

Personal details
- Born: Madeline Elizabeth Cox; 1963 Jersey City, New Jersey, U.S.
- Education: Rutgers University (BA, MA); Seton Hall University (JD)

Madeline Elizabeth Cox Arleo (born 1963) is a United States district judge of the United States District Court for the District of New Jersey and a former United States magistrate judge of the same court.

== Biography ==
Arleo was born in 1963 in Jersey City, New Jersey. She received a Bachelor of Arts degree in 1985 from Rutgers College and a Master of Arts degree in 1986 from Rutgers University. She received a Juris Doctor, summa cum laude, in 1989 from Seton Hall University School of Law, where she was Editor in Chief of the Law Review. She began her legal career as a law clerk to Judge Marie L. Garibaldi of the New Jersey Supreme Court, from 1989 to 1990. She worked at the law firm of Clapp & Eisenberg from 1990 to 1994 and at the law firm of Barry & McMoran from 1994 to 1998. From 1998 to 2000, she was a partner at the law firm of Tompkins, McGuire, Wachenfeld & Barry, LLP, where her practice focused on civil litigation in Federal and State courts.

=== Federal judicial service ===
From 2000 to 2014, she served as a United States magistrate judge in the District of New Jersey.

On June 26, 2014, President Barack Obama nominated Arleo to serve as a United States district judge of the United States District Court for the District of New Jersey, to the seat vacated by Judge Dennis M. Cavanaugh, who retired on January 31, 2014. On July 29, 2014, a hearing before the United States Senate Committee on the Judiciary was held on her nomination. On September 18, 2014, her nomination was reported out of committee by a voice vote. On November 18, 2014, Senate Majority Leader Harry Reid filed for cloture on her nomination. On November 19, 2014, the United States Senate invoked cloture on her nomination by a 56–40 vote. On November 20, 2014, her nomination was confirmed by a voice vote. She received her judicial commission on November 21, 2014.

Legal offices
| Preceded by Dennis M. Cavanaugh | Judge of the United States District Court for the District of New Jersey; 2014–present | Incumbent |
