= Robert Cowen =

American judge (born 1930)

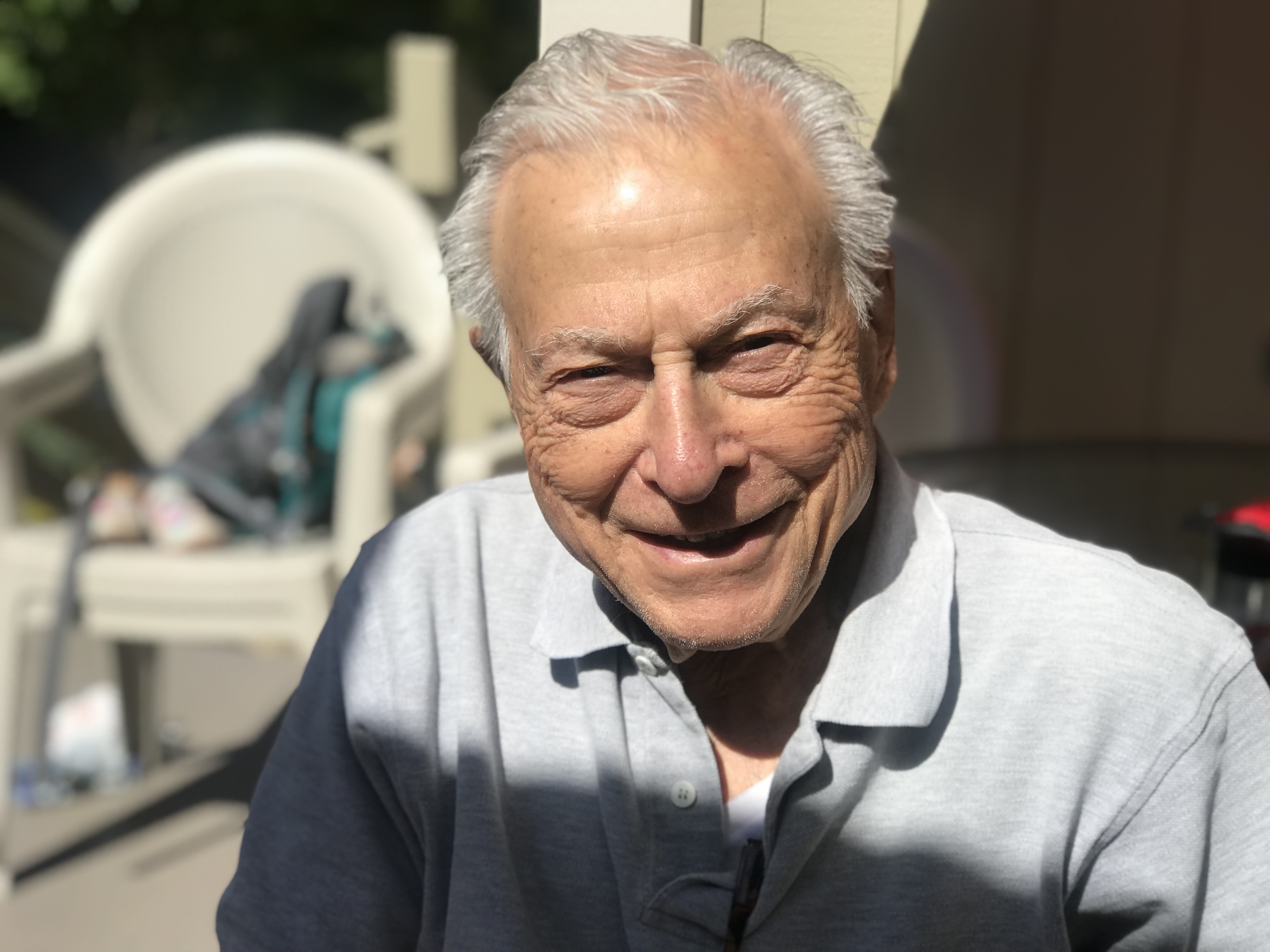
- Cowen in 2020

Senior Judge of the United States Court of Appeals for the Third Circuit
- Incumbent
- Assumed office September 4, 1998

Judge of the United States Court of Appeals for the Third Circuit
- In office November 9, 1987 – September 4, 1998
- Appointed by: Ronald Reagan
- Preceded by: James Hunter III
- Succeeded by: Julio M. Fuentes

Judge for the United States District Court for the District of New Jersey
- In office November 4, 1985 – November 16, 1987
- Appointed by: Ronald Reagan
- Preceded by: Seat established
- Succeeded by: Alfred M. Wolin

Personal details
- Born: September 4, 1930 (age 96) Newark, New Jersey, U.S.
- Education: Drake University (BS); Rutgers University, Newark (LLB)

Robert E. Cowen (born September 4, 1930) is a Senior United States circuit judge of the United States Court of Appeals for the Third Circuit based in Philadelphia. He joined the court in 1987 after being nominated by President Ronald Reagan. Cowen has served in the federal judiciary since 1978.

== Early life and education ==
A native of New Jersey, Cowen graduated from Drake University in 1952 with a Bachelor of Science degree. In 1958, Cowen graduated from Rutgers School of Law–Newark with a Bachelor of Laws. Cowen attended Columbia Law School before leaving to join the Army, where he earned the G.I. Bill, which he needed in order to pay for his education.

== Career ==
Cowen began his legal career as a law clerk for Judge Walter Conklin of the New Jersey Superior Court from 1958 to 1959 before becoming a private practice attorney licensed in the State of New Jersey from 1959 to 1969. Cowen also served as an Assistant county prosecutor for the Essex County, New Jersey Prosecutor's Office from 1969 to 1970 before joining the New Jersey Attorney General's Office as a deputy state attorney general from 1970 to 1973 before becoming the director of Ethics and Professional Services in the Administrative Office of the United States Courts for New Jersey from 1973 to 1978.

=== Federal judicial service ===
From 1978 to 1985, Cowen was a United States magistrate judge of the United States District Court for the District of New Jersey. Cowen was nominated by President Ronald Reagan on October 7, 1985 to the United States District Court for the District of New Jersey, to a new seat created by 98 Stat. 333 which was approved by Congress. Cowen was confirmed by the United States Senate on November 1, 1985 on a Senate vote and received commission on November 4, 1985. Cowen left the District of New Jersey on November 16, 1987, due to his elevation to the court of appeals.

Less than two years later, Cowen was nominated by President Reagan on August 7, 1987, to a seat on the United States Court of Appeals for the Third Circuit vacated by Judge James Hunter III who assumed senior status. Cowen was confirmed by the Senate on November 6, 1987 by unanimous consent and received his commission on November 9, 1987. Cowen served 11 years before assuming senior status on September 4, 1998. Cowen assumed inactive status on April 1, 2022. He resumed active status briefly in July 2022 for the purpose of resolving J. M. v. Summit City Board of Education.

Legal offices
New seat	Judge of the United States District Court for the District of New Jersey; 1985–1987	Succeeded by Alfred M. Wolin
Preceded by James Hunter III	Judge of the United States Court of Appeals for the Third Circuit; 1987–1998	Succeeded by Julio M. Fuentes
