= James Hunter III =

American judge (1916-1989)

Senior Judge of the United States Court of Appeals for the Third Circuit
- In office June 30, 1986 – February 10, 1989

Judge of the United States Court of Appeals for the Third Circuit
- In office September 23, 1971 – June 30, 1986
- Appointed by: Richard Nixon
- Preceded by: William Francis Smith
- Succeeded by: Robert Cowen

Personal details
- Born: James Hunter III; December 26, 1916 Westville, New Jersey
- Died: February 10, 1989 (aged 72) Mount Holly, New Jersey
- Education: Temple University (BA); University of Pennsylvania Law School (LLB)

James Hunter III (December 26, 1916 – February 10, 1989) was a United States circuit judge of the United States Court of Appeals for the Third Circuit.

== Education and career ==
Born in Westville, New Jersey, Hunter received a Bachelor of Arts degree from Temple University in 1936. He received a Bachelor of Laws from the University of Pennsylvania Law School in 1939. He was in private practice of law in New Jersey from 1939 to 1971. He served in the United States Marine Corps from 1942 to 1946.

== Federal judicial service ==
Hunter was nominated by President Richard Nixon on July 19, 1971, to a seat on the United States Court of Appeals for the Third Circuit vacated by Judge William Francis Smith. He was confirmed by the United States Senate on September 21, 1971, and received his commission on September 23, 1971. He assumed senior status on June 30, 1986. His service was terminated on February 10, 1989, due to his death.

== Death ==
A resident of Medford, New Jersey, Hunter died of heart failure at the age of 72 on February 10, 1989, in a hospital in Mount Holly.

== Sources ==
Legal offices
Preceded by William Francis Smith	Judge of the United States Court of Appeals for the Third Circuit; 1971–1986	Succeeded by Robert Cowen
