= William Francis Smith =

American judge (1903–1968)

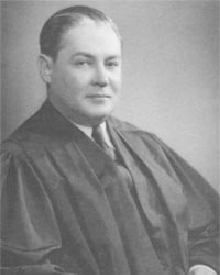

Judge of the United States Court of Appeals for the Third Circuit
- In office August 30, 1961 – February 26, 1968
- Appointed by: John F. Kennedy
- Preceded by: Phillip Forman
- Succeeded by: James Hunter III

Chief Judge of the United States District Court for the District of New Jersey
- In office 1959–1961
- Preceded by: Phillip Forman
- Succeeded by: Thomas M. Madden

Judge of the United States District Court for the District of New Jersey
- In office February 15, 1941 – September 12, 1961
- Appointed by: Franklin D. Roosevelt
- Preceded by: Seat established by 54 Stat. 219
- Succeeded by: Robert Shaw

Personal details
- Born: William Francis Smith; February 4, 1903 Perth Amboy, New Jersey, U.S.
- Died: February 26, 1968 (aged 65) New Brunswick, New Jersey, U.S.
- Education: Columbia University (PhG); New Jersey Law School (LLB)

William Francis Smith (February 24, 1903 – February 26, 1968) was a United States circuit judge of the United States Court of Appeals for the Third Circuit and previously was a United States district judge of the United States District Court for the District of New Jersey.

== Education and career ==
Born in Perth Amboy, New Jersey, the son of John Stephan Smith and Ann Elizabeth Owens, Smith received a Graduate of Pharmacy degree from Columbia University in 1922. He received a Bachelor of Laws from New Jersey Law School (now Rutgers Law School) in 1929. He became deputy mayor of Perth Amboy in 1926. Smith was in private practice of law in New Jersey from 1930 to 1931 and was an instructor at New Jersey Law School from 1930 to 1935. He served as an Assistant United States Attorney of the District of New Jersey from 1934 to 1940. He was the United States Attorney for the District of New Jersey from 1940 to 1941.

== Federal judicial service ==
Smith was nominated by President Franklin D. Roosevelt on January 23, 1941, to the United States District Court for the District of New Jersey, to a new seat created by 54 Stat. 219. He was confirmed by the United States Senate on February 13, 1941, and received his commission on February 15, 1941. He served as Chief Judge from 1959 to 1961. His service was terminated on September 12, 1961, due to elevation to the Third Circuit.

Smith was nominated by President John F. Kennedy on August 15, 1961, to a seat on the United States Court of Appeals for the Third Circuit vacated by Judge Phillip Forman. He was confirmed by the Senate on August 30, 1961, and received his commission the same day. His service was terminated on February 26, 1968, due to his death at Saint Peter's University Hospital in New Brunswick, New Jersey.

=== Federal court service ===
Smith was believed to have been the youngest federal court judge at the time of his appointment. In 1959 he was called upon by Chief Justice Earl Warren to clear up a logjam that had developed at the Brooklyn Federal Court of the Eastern District of New York, and he brought the court's docket up to date in six months.

== Personal life ==
On August 29, 1935, he married Marie Cathers.

Legal offices
Preceded by Seat established by 54 Stat. 219	Judge of the United States District Court for the District of New Jersey; 1941–1961	Succeeded by Robert Shaw
Preceded by Phillip Forman	Chief Judge of the United States District Court for the District of New Jersey; 1959–1961	Succeeded by Thomas M. Madden
Preceded by Phillip Forman	Judge of the United States Court of Appeals for the Third Circuit; 1961–1968	Succeeded by James Hunter III
