= Austin Leander Staley =

American judge (1902–1978)

Senior Judge of the United States Court of Appeals for the Third Circuit
- In office December 31, 1967 – August 3, 1978

Chief Judge of the United States Court of Appeals for the Third Circuit
- In office 1966–1967
- Preceded by: Harry Ellis Kalodner
- Succeeded by: William H. Hastie

Judge of the United States Court of Appeals for the Third Circuit
- In office July 5, 1950 – December 31, 1967
- Appointed by: Harry S. Truman
- Preceded by: John Joseph O'Connell
- Succeeded by: Ruggero J. Aldisert

Personal details
- Born: Austin Leander Staley; December 30, 1902 Pittsburgh, Pennsylvania
- Died: August 3, 1978 (aged 75)
- Education: Duquesne University School of Law (LLB)

Austin Leander Staley (December 30, 1902 – August 3, 1978) was a United States circuit judge of the United States Court of Appeals for the Third Circuit.

== Education and career ==
Born in Pittsburgh, Pennsylvania, Staley received a Bachelor of Laws from Duquesne University School of Law in 1928. He was in private practice in Pittsburgh from 1928 to 1950. He was an assistant city solicitor in Pittsburgh in 1934. He was a deputy attorney general of Commonwealth of Pennsylvania from 1934 to 1935. He was Director of the State Workmen's Compensation Bureau from 1935 to 1936. He was a deputy secretary of the Pennsylvania Department of Labor and Industry from 1936 to 1939.

== Federal judicial service ==
Staley was nominated by President Harry S. Truman on April 27, 1950, to a seat on the United States Court of Appeals for the Third Circuit vacated by Judge John Joseph O'Connell. He was confirmed by the United States Senate on June 27, 1950, and received his commission on July 5, 1950. He served as Chief Judge and as a member of the Judicial Conference of the United States from 1966 to 1967. He assumed senior status on December 31, 1967. His service terminated on August 3, 1978, due to his death.

== Sources ==
Legal offices
| Preceded by John Joseph O'Connell | Judge of the United States Court of Appeals for the Third Circuit; 1950–1967 | Succeeded by Ruggero J. Aldisert |
| Preceded by Harry Ellis Kalodner | Chief Judge of the United States Court of Appeals for the Third Circuit; 1966–1967 | Succeeded by William H. Hastie |
