= George Philip Jones =

American judge (1877–1954)

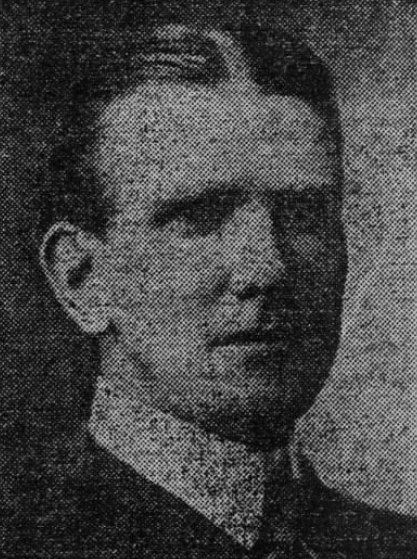
Photograph of George P. Jones from The Saint Paul Globe, 1902.

George Philip Jones (September 22, 1877 – December 9, 1954) was a judge of the United States District Court of the Virgin Islands from 1936 to 1937.

Born in a log house on a farm about a mile from Luverne, Minnesota, his father was a Welsh farmer who came to America in 1868. Jones was raised on the Minnesota frontier, attending school in Luverne in the winters and working on the farm in the summers. A year before completing high school work he became a schoolteacher, which he continued until the Spanish–American War broke out. He was then "instrumental in raising a company for the Thirteenth Minnesota; became quartermaster of the company and served with the regiment until it was mustered out". The following winter he enrolled at Hamline University and at once "became a leader in athletics and played on the football team".

A candidate for clerk of the supreme court at age 24, he was one of the youngest candidates ever nominated for a statewide office by a major party in the state. Jones "leaped into political prominence" at the Democratic state convention of 1900, with one account stating:

After Governor Lind had been nominated by Senator John A. Johnson, a tall, boyish appearing young man at the side of the convention hall secured recognition and began speaking. His speech was interrupted with calls of "What's your name and country?" "Jones, of Rock" answered the strange young man and a few minutes later Jones, of Rock, was famous. His speech easily eclipsed every other oratorical effort of the day and so moved the big convention that it was generally admitted that he might have asked for the nomination to any other office on the ticket and secured it by acclamation.

After the convention he stumped the state for Lind. In January 1901, he travelled to the Philippines at his own expense "to study the much mooted Philippine question". He served for some period as county attorney for Clearwater, Beltrami and Stearns counties.

Appointed by Franklin D. Roosevelt to the United States District Court of the Virgin Islands in 1936, his service ended due to the expiration of his recess appointment. Jones later served as hearing commissioner for the National Production Authority (NPA) in the Los Angeles, California, area.

Jones died at his home in Santa Ana, California, at the age of 76. He was thought to have been "the last living delegate to the 1904 convention of the Democratic party".

Political offices
Preceded by Newly established seat	Judge; 1936–1937	Succeeded by William H. Hastie
