= Alfred M. Wolin =

American judge (born 1932)

Senior Judge of the United States District Court for the District of New Jersey
- In office September 18, 2000 – June 30, 2004

Judge of the United States District Court for the District of New Jersey
- In office December 9, 1987 – September 18, 2000
- Appointed by: Ronald Reagan
- Preceded by: Robert Cowen
- Succeeded by: Dennis M. Cavanaugh

Personal details
- Born: Alfred M. Wolin; September 17, 1932 (age 94) Orange, New Jersey
- Education: University of Michigan (B.A.); Rutgers Law School (J.D.)

Alfred M. Wolin (born September 17, 1932) is a former United States district judge of the United States District Court for the District of New Jersey.

== Early life and education ==
Wolin was born in Orange, New Jersey and graduated from Thomas Jefferson High School. He received a Bachelor of Arts degree from the University of Michigan in 1954. He was in the United States Army 1954 to 1956 and became a specialist 2nd class stationed in Germany. He received a Juris Doctor from the Newark campus of Rutgers Law School in 1959.

== Career ==
Wolin was in private practice in Elizabeth, New Jersey from 1960 to 1980. From 1965 to 1974, he was a chief staff attorney of the Union County Legal Aid Society, and an attorney for the Roselle Board of Adjustment. He was a special assistant prosecutor for Union County, New Jersey in 1970, and was a legislative aide to United States Representative Matthew John Rinaldo from 1970 to 1972. He was a congressional field representative for New Jersey's 12th congressional district from 1972 to 1979. He was a municipal prosecutor for the Town of Westfield, New Jersey from 1973 to 1974. He was a judge of the Union County District Court from 1980 to 1985, then on the Superior Court of New Jersey from 1980 to 1987, on the Juvenile and Domestic Relations Court from 1980 to 1982, the Civil Part from 1982 to 1983, and finally as presiding judge of the Criminal Part from 1983 to 1987.

== Federal judicial service ==
On September 14, 1987, Wolin was nominated by President Ronald Reagan to a seat on the United States District Court for the District of New Jersey vacated by Robert Cowen. Wolin was confirmed by the United States Senate on December 8, 1987, and received his commission the following day. He assumed senior status on September 18, 2000, serving in that capacity until his retirement on June 30, 2004. He served as a Judge of the United States Alien Terrorist Removal Court from 1996 to 2004.

== Sources ==
Legal offices
Preceded by Robert Cowen	Judge of the United States District Court for the District of New Jersey; 1987–2000	Succeeded by Dennis M. Cavanaugh
