= Dennis M. Cavanaugh =

American judge (born 1947)

Dennis Michael Cavanaugh
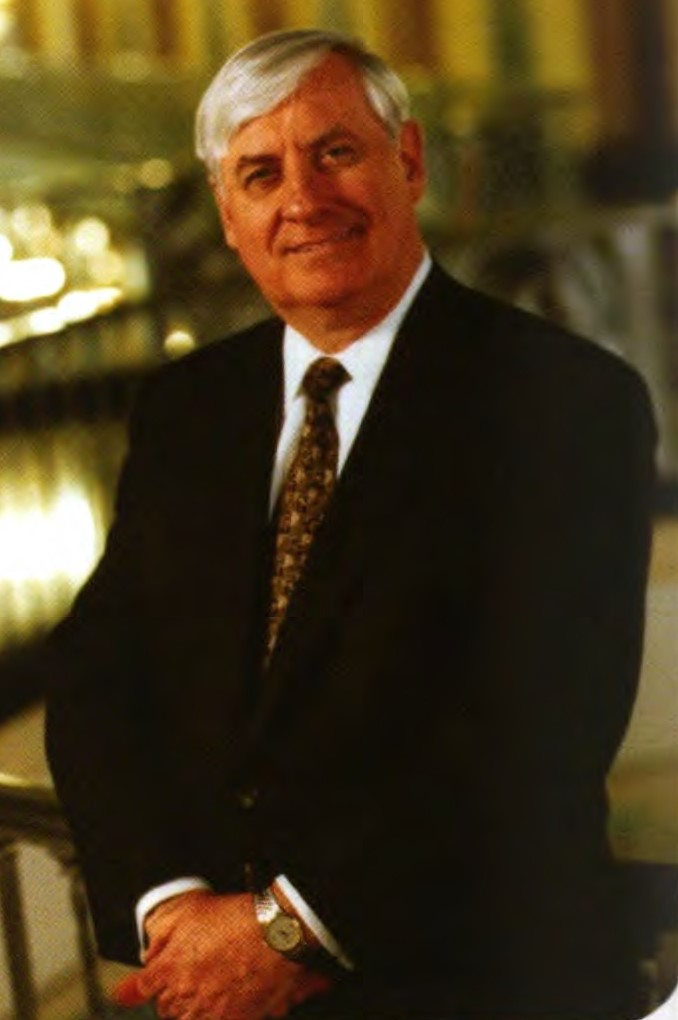

Judge of the United States District Court for the District of New Jersey
- In office September 20, 2000 – January 31, 2014
- Appointed by: Bill Clinton
- Preceded by: Alfred M. Wolin
- Succeeded by: Madeline Cox Arleo

Magistrate Judge of the United States District Court for the District of New Jersey
- In office 1993–2000

Personal details
- Born: Dennis Michael Cavanaugh; January 28, 1947 (age 79) Orange, New Jersey
- Education: Morehead State University (BA); Seton Hall University School of Law (JD)

Dennis Michael Cavanaugh (born January 28, 1947) is a retired United States district judge of the United States District Court for the District of New Jersey.

== Early life and education ==
Cavanaugh was born on January 28, 1947, in Orange, New Jersey. He was raised as an Irish Catholic. Cavanaugh was educated at Morehead State University (Bachelor of Arts, 1969) and Seton Hall University School of Law (Juris Doctor, 1972). Cavanaugh teaches at Seton Hall as a member of the law school's adjunct faculty.

== Career ==
Cavanaugh began his legal career as a law clerk to Judge Francis W. Hayden in the New Jersey Superior Court (1972–73). He was then an Assistant Deputy Public Defender for the New Jersey Office of the Public Defender (1973–77) before entering private practice in various law firms in New Jersey (1977–92). Cavanaugh's private practice includes his partnership at the law firms of McCormack Petrolle & Matthews (1992), Whipple Ross & Hirsh (1987–92) and Tompkins McGuire & Wachenfeld (1984–87). He also served as a partner (1980–84) and associate (1977–80) at Lum Biunno & Tompkins. Cavanaugh was the Borough Prosecutor for the Borough of Caldwell (1988–89).

== Federal judicial service ==
On May 3, 2000, Cavanaugh was nominated by President Bill Clinton, to a seat on the United States District Court for the District of New Jersey, which had been vacated by Judge Alfred M. Wolin. Cavanaugh was confirmed by the United States Senate on July 21, 2000, and received commission on September 20, 2000. Cavanaugh was formerly a United States magistrate judge of the same district (1993–2000). His service terminated on January 31, 2014, due to retirement.

== Sources ==
Legal offices
Preceded by Alfred M. Wolin	Judge on the United States District Court for the District of New Jersey; 2000–2014	Succeeded by Madeline Cox Arleo
