= Arianna J. Freeman =

American judge (born 1978)

Arianna Freeman
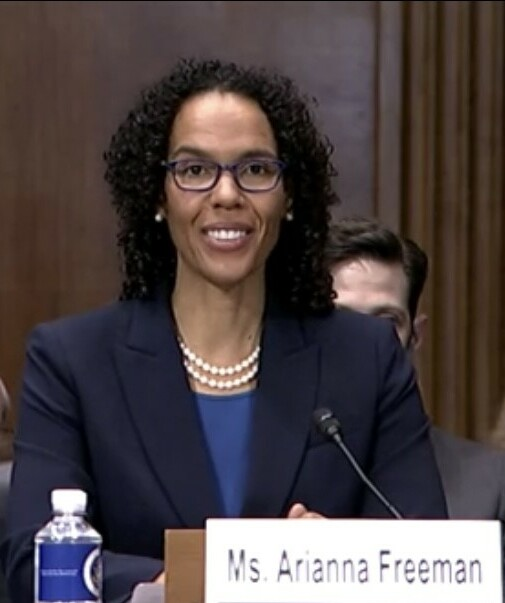

Judge of the United States Court of Appeals for the Third Circuit
- Incumbent
- Assumed office October 20, 2022
- Appointed by: Joe Biden
- Preceded by: Theodore McKee

Personal details
- Born: Arianna Julia Freeman; 1978 (age 47–48) Boston, Massachusetts, U.S.
- Education: Swarthmore College (BA); Yale University (JD)

Arianna Julia Freeman (born 1978) is an American lawyer from Pennsylvania who serves as a United States circuit judge of the United States Court of Appeals for the Third Circuit.

== Early life and education ==
Freeman was born in 1978 in Boston. She received her Bachelor of Arts with honors from Swarthmore College in 2001 and earned her Juris Doctor (J.D.) in 2007 from Yale Law School, where she was an editor of The Yale Journal of International Law.

== Career ==
Freeman served as a law clerk for Judge James T. Giles from 2007 to 2008 and Judge C. Darnell Jones II from 2008 to 2009, both on the United States District Court for the Eastern District of Pennsylvania. From 2009 to 2022, she worked at the Federal Community Defender Office including as an assistant federal defender as a research and writing specialist from 2009 to 2014 and in the Non-Capital Habeas Unit from 2014 to 2016. From 2016 to 2022, she was a managing attorney with the Federal Community Defender office for the Eastern District of Pennsylvania in Philadelphia.

Freeman was part of the legal team handling the federal habeas corpus challenge of the death sentence of Terrance Williams; the appeal prevailed at the United States Supreme Court.

=== Federal judicial service ===
On January 19, 2022, President Joe Biden announced his intent to nominate Freeman to serve as a United States circuit judge for the United States Court of Appeals for the Third Circuit. President Biden nominated Freeman to the seat vacated by Judge Theodore McKee, who on July 29, 2021, notified the White House that he intended to assume senior status upon confirmation of his successor. On January 28, 2022, following Justice Stephen Breyer's announcement of his intention to retire as an Associate Justice of the Supreme Court of the United States, Freeman was mentioned as one of the potential nominees for a Supreme Court appointment by President Joe Biden. On March 2, 2022, a hearing on her nomination was held before the Senate Judiciary Committee. During her confirmation hearing, Republican senators criticized her work as a public defender. On April 4, 2022, the committee failed to report her nomination by an 11–11 vote. On June 22, 2022, the United States Senate discharged the committee from further consideration of her nomination by a 50–48 vote. On September 6, 2022, Majority Leader Chuck Schumer filed cloture on her nomination. On September 12, 2022, the Senate invoked cloture on her nomination by a 45–44 vote. On September 13, 2022, the Senate rejected her nomination by a 47–50 vote. Freeman was the first Biden judicial nominee to be rejected by the Senate. On September 29, 2022, upon reconsideration, her nomination was confirmed by a 50–47 vote. She received her judicial commission on October 20, 2022. She is the first African-American woman to serve on the Third Circuit.

==== Notable rulings ====
On July 17, 2026, Freeman authored the majority opinion in Association of New Jersey Rifle and Pistol Clubs Inc. v. Davenport, which held that New Jersey's bans on semi-automatic rifles and large capacity magazines violated the Second Amendment to the United States Constitution.

== See also ==
- List of African American federal judges
- List of African American jurists
- Joe Biden judicial appointment controversies
- Joe Biden Supreme Court candidates

Legal offices
| Preceded by Theodore McKee | Judge of the United States Court of Appeals for the Third Circuit; 2022–present | Incumbent |
