= Ruggero J. Aldisert =

American judge (1919–2014)

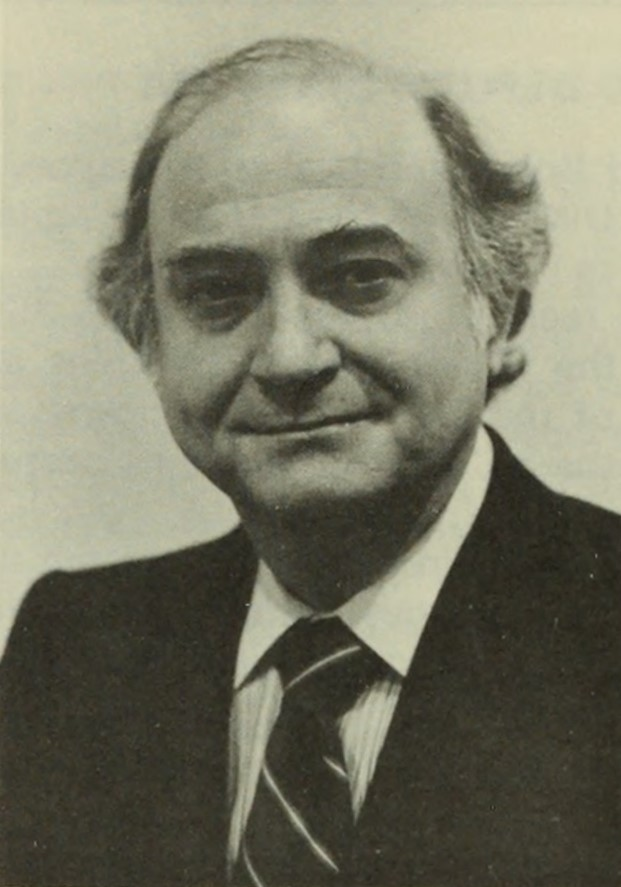
- Aldisert in 1972

Senior Judge of the United States Court of Appeals for the Third Circuit
- In office December 31, 1986 – December 28, 2014

Chief Judge of the United States Court of Appeals for the Third Circuit
- In office June 20, 1984 – December 31, 1986
- Preceded by: Collins J. Seitz
- Succeeded by: John Joseph Gibbons

Judge of the United States Court of Appeals for the Third Circuit
- In office July 29, 1968 – December 31, 1986
- Appointed by: Lyndon B. Johnson
- Preceded by: Austin Leander Staley
- Succeeded by: Anthony Joseph Scirica

Personal details
- Born: Ruggero John Aldisert; November 10, 1919 Carnegie, Pennsylvania, U.S.
- Died: December 28, 2014 (aged 95) Santa Barbara, California, U.S.
- Education: University of Pittsburgh (BA, JD)

Ruggero John Aldisert (November 10, 1919 – December 28, 2014) was a United States circuit judge of the United States Court of Appeals for the Third Circuit.

== Early life and education ==
Born November 10, 1919, in Carnegie, Pennsylvania, to Italian emigrant parents, Aldisert attended the local public schools. He graduated from Carnegie High School in 1937, then earned a Bachelor of Arts degree in 1941 from the University of Pittsburgh. However, World War II interrupted his legal studies. He volunteered and joined the United States Marine Corps, serving as battery commander in the Pacific Theater (1942 to 1946), attaining the rank of Major. He then finished his legal studies using the GI Bill, and received his Juris Doctor in 1947 from the University of Pittsburgh School of Law. He married and raised a family, and also became active in the Italian Sons and Daughters of America, becoming the national president from 1954 to 1968.

== Early career ==
Aldisert had a private legal practice in Pittsburgh, Pennsylvania from 1947 to 1961, handling trials in civil and criminal matters. He re-entered government service by becoming a Judge of the Pennsylvania Court of Common Pleas of Allegheny County (from 1961 to 1968). From 1963 until 1986, Aldisert also taught law as an adjunct professor at his alma mater.

== Federal judicial service ==
President Lyndon B. Johnson nominated Aldisert to a seat on the United States Court of Appeals for the Third Circuit vacated by Judge Austin Leander Staley. The United States Senate confirmed him on July 29, 1968, and Judge Aldisert received his commission that same day. In addition to his Third Circuit duties, Judge Aldisert served on the board of the Federal Judicial Center from 1972 to 1979. He served as Chief Judge of the Third Circuit, and as a member of the Judicial Conference of the United States from June 20, 1984 to December 31, 1986.

Judge Aldisert assumed senior status on December 31, 1986, but remained active for nearly two more decades. His book on Opinion Writing was distributed to American judges at judicial conferences, and reached a second edition. In addition to sitting on many appellate panels after taking senior status, Judge Aldisert also traveled to England, Germany, Italy, the former Czechoslovakia, and to Poland in 1980 (when that nation began to rebel against communist rule) to lecture on American legal principles.

== Death and legacy ==
Judge Aldisert stopped hearing cases in August 2014 after 46 years on the bench. He died following a heart attack on December 28, 2014, aged 95, in Santa Barbara, California, and was survived by his widow, children and grandchildren. He is buried at Arlington National Cemetery.

== Writings ==
Aldisert wrote a memoir and several books on jurisprudence and law practice, including The Judicial Process (West 2nd. ed. 1996), Logic for Lawyers: A Guide to Clear Legal Thinking (NITA 3rd ed. 1997), Winning on Appeal (NITA 2nd ed. 2003), Opinion Writing (West 2nd. ed. 2009) and A Judge's Advice: 50 Years on the Bench (CAP Press 2011). He also published a novel, Almost the Truth (about the OSS and buried treasure). Aldisert has written about what life as a senior judge is like.

== Notable cases ==
Judge Aldisert dissented in an ABSCAM sting case, in which a Philadelphia jury had convicted city councilmen of corruption, claiming that the FBI tactics resembled those in totalitarian Nazi Germany or Italy.

Aldisert wrote a dissenting opinion in FAIR v. Rumsfeld, a high-profile case challenging the Solomon Amendment, a federal law denying federal funding to colleges and universities which prohibited on-campus recruiting by the military. The majority opinion enjoined enforcement of the law on First Amendment grounds (campuses had barred military recruiters based on the military's then "don't ask, don't tell" policy concerning sexual orientation). The United States Supreme Court ultimately vindicated Judge Aldisert's dissenting view which found the measures constitutional; Chief Justice John Roberts wrote the unanimous opinion in Rumsfeld v. Forum for Academic & Institutional Rights, Inc.

== Honors ==
In 2005, Judge Aldisert became the first recipient of the "Distinguished Appellate Jurist Award", bestowed by the American Bar Association's Council of Appellate Lawyers. In 2008 Aldisert received the Legal Writing Institute's "Golden Pen Award."

== See also ==
- List of United States federal judges by longevity of service

== Sources ==
Legal offices
Preceded by Austin Leander Staley	Judge of the United States Court of Appeals for the Third Circuit; 1968–1986	Succeeded by Anthony Joseph Scirica
Preceded by Collins J. Seitz	Chief Judge of the United States Court of Appeals for the Third Circuit; 1984–1986	Succeeded by John Joseph Gibbons
