= Carol Los Mansmann =

American judge (1942–2002)

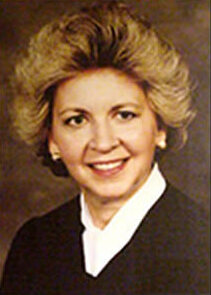

Judge of the United States Court of Appeals for the Third Circuit
- In office April 4, 1985 – March 9, 2002
- Appointed by: Ronald Reagan
- Preceded by: Seat established by 98 Stat. 333
- Succeeded by: D. Michael Fisher

Judge of the United States District Court for the Western District of Pennsylvania
- In office March 19, 1982 – April 22, 1985
- Appointed by: Ronald Reagan
- Preceded by: William W. Knox
- Succeeded by: D. Brooks Smith

Personal details
- Born: Carol Los; August 7, 1942 Pittsburgh, Pennsylvania, U.S.
- Died: March 9, 2002 (aged 59) Pittsburgh, Pennsylvania, U.S.
- Party: Republican
- Spouse: Jerry Mansmann
- Children: 4
- Education: Duquesne University (BA, JD)

Carol Los Mansmann (née Los; August 7, 1942 – March 9, 2002) was a United States circuit judge of the United States Court of Appeals for the Third Circuit and a United States district judge of the United States District Court for the Western District of Pennsylvania.

== Education and career ==
Born in Pittsburgh, Pennsylvania, of Polish descent, the daughter of Walter Joseph and Regina Mary (Pilarska) Los. Mansmann received a Bachelor of Arts degree from Duquesne University in 1964 and a Juris Doctor from Duquesne University School of Law in 1967, one of only two women to graduate that law school in 1967.

She was a law clerk to Ralph H. Smith, Jr. of the Allegheny County Court of Common Pleas from 1967 to 1968, and then an assistant district attorney of Allegheny County, Pennsylvania from 1968 to 1972. In this capacity, she successfully argued the Fourth Amendment case of Chambers v. Maroney before the U.S. Supreme Court. She was in private practice in Pittsburgh from 1973 to 1979, and was also a special assistant to the Attorney General of Pennsylvania from 1974 to 1979. In this role, she argued the Supreme Court case of Colautti v. Franklin, unsuccessfully defending portions of Pennsylvania's Abortion Control Act. Mansmann was on the faculty of the Duquesne University School of Law as an associate professor of law from 1974 to 1983, and later as an adjunct professor of law from 1987 to 1994.

== Federal judicial service ==
Mansmann was nominated by President Ronald Reagan on February 23, 1982, to a seat on the United States District Court for the Western District of Pennsylvania vacated by Judge William W. Knox. She was confirmed by the United States Senate on March 18, 1982, and received commission on March 19, 1982. Her service terminated on April 22, 1985, due to elevation to the court of appeals.

Mansmann was nominated by President Reagan on March 7, 1985, to the United States Court of Appeals for the Third Circuit, to a new seat authorized by 98 Stat. 333. She was confirmed by the Senate on April 3, 1985, and received commission on April 4, 1985. Her service terminated on March 9, 2002, due to death.

== Death ==
Mansmann died of breast cancer (with which she had initially been diagnosed in 1989) at UPMC Montefiore, Pittsburgh, on March 9, 2002, aged 59.

== Sources ==
Legal offices
Preceded by William W. Knox	Judge of the United States District Court for the Western District of Pennsylvania; 1982–1985	Succeeded by D. Brooks Smith
Preceded by Seat established by 98 Stat. 333	Judge of the United States Court of Appeals for the Third Circuit; 1985–2002	Succeeded by D. Michael Fisher
