= John Joseph O'Connell =

American judge (1894–1949)

Judge of the United States Court of Appeals for the Third Circuit
- In office October 11, 1945 – December 16, 1949
- Appointed by: Harry S. Truman
- Preceded by: Seat established by 58 Stat. 796
- Succeeded by: Austin Leander Staley

Personal details
- Born: John Joseph O'Connell; September 8, 1894 Pittsburgh, Pennsylvania
- Died: December 16, 1949 (aged 55)
- Education: Duquesne University (BS); Duquesne University School of Law (LLB)

John Joseph O'Connell (September 8, 1894 – December 16, 1949) was a United States circuit judge of the United States Court of Appeals for the Third Circuit.

== Education and career ==
Born in Pittsburgh, Pennsylvania, O'Connell received a Bachelor of Science degree from Duquesne University in 1928, and a Bachelor of Laws from Duquesne University School of Law in 1931. He served in the United States Navy during World War I from 1918 to 1919. He entered private practice in Pittsburgh from 1931 to 1936. He was an assistant solicitor for Allegheny County, Pennsylvania from 1936 to 1943. He was solicitor for Allegheny County from 1944 to 1945.

== Federal judicial service ==
O'Connell was nominated by President Harry S. Truman on September 12, 1945, to the United States Court of Appeals for the Third Circuit, to a new seat authorized by 58 Stat. 796. He was confirmed by the United States Senate on October 3, 1945, and received his commission on October 11, 1945. His service terminated on December 16, 1949, due to his death.

== Sources ==
Legal offices
Preceded by Seat established by 58 Stat. 796	Judge of the United States Court of Appeals for the Third Circuit; 1945–1949	Succeeded by Austin Leander Staley
