= Collins J. Seitz =

American judge (1914–1998)

Senior Judge of the United States Court of Appeals for the Third Circuit
- In office June 1, 1989 – October 16, 1998

Presiding Judge of the United States Foreign Intelligence Surveillance Court of Review
- In office March 19, 1987 – March 18, 1994
- Appointed by: William Rehnquist
- Preceded by: A. Leon Higginbotham Jr.
- Succeeded by: Paul Hitch Roney

Chief Judge of the United States Court of Appeals for the Third Circuit
- In office May 31, 1971 – June 20, 1984
- Preceded by: William H. Hastie
- Succeeded by: Ruggero J. Aldisert

Judge of the United States Court of Appeals for the Third Circuit
- In office June 9, 1966 – June 1, 1989
- Appointed by: Lyndon B. Johnson
- Preceded by: John Biggs Jr.
- Succeeded by: Jane Richards Roth

Chancellor of the Delaware Court of Chancery
- In office June 1951 – June 17, 1966
- Appointed by: Elbert N. Carvel
- Preceded by: Daniel F. Wolcott
- Succeeded by: William Duffy

Vice Chancellor of the Delaware Court of Chancery
- In office February 1, 1946 – June 1951
- Appointed by: William W. Harrington
- Preceded by: George B. Pearson Jr.
- Succeeded by: Howard W. Bramhall

Personal details
- Born: Collins Jacques Seitz; June 20, 1914 Wilmington, Delaware, U.S.
- Died: October 16, 1998 (aged 84) Wilmington, Delaware, U.S.
- Spouse: Virginia Day (m. 1955)
- Relations: John F. R. Seitz (brother)
- Children: 4, including Virginia and Collins Jr.
- Education: University of Delaware (AB); University of Virginia School of Law (LLB)
- Awards: Presidential Citizens Medal (2025)

Collins Jacques Seitz (June 20, 1914 – October 16, 1998) was an American judge and lawyer from Wilmington, Delaware. He was a United States circuit judge of the United States Court of Appeals for the Third Circuit from 1966 to 1998, and was its chief judge from 1971 to 1984. He also served as the presiding judge of the United States Foreign Intelligence Surveillance Court of Review from 1987 to 1994.

Seitz had previously served on the Delaware Court of Chancery, where he presided over the 1952 case Gebhart v. Belton, and ruled that the racial segregation of Delaware's public schools was unconstitutional. The case was one of several that led to the U.S. Supreme Court's landmark decision in Brown v. Board of Education two years later.

== Background ==
Born on June 20, 1914, in Wilmington, Delaware, Seitz received an Artium Baccalaureus degree in 1937 from the University of Delaware and a Bachelor of Laws in 1940 from the University of Virginia School of Law.

== Career ==
He entered private practice in Wilmington from 1940 to 1946. He served as a Vice Chancellor of the Delaware Court of Chancery from 1946 to 1951, as a justice of the Delaware Supreme Court from 1949 to 1951, and as the Chancellor of the Delaware Court of Chancery from 1951 to 1966.

=== Gephart v. Belton ===
During his term as Chancellor, Seitz ruled on the Gebhart v. Belton case, which was later combined with several other cases into the Supreme Court of the United States decision in Brown v. Board of Education. Seitz determined that segregation was intrinsically discriminatory but that the Supreme Court forbade a ruling on such a basis in Plessy v. Ferguson and Gong Lum v. Rice: "[W]hile State-imposed segregation in lower education provides Negroes with inferior educational opportunities, such inferiority has not yet been recognized by the United States Supreme Court as violating the Fourteenth Amendment. On the contrary, it has been by implication excluded as a Constitutional factor.". Despite this limitation, Chancellor Seitz ruled that conditions were unequal, and that the only remedy that could suffice was integration. The Delaware Supreme Court affirmed his ruling. Thus, when the consolidated Brown litigation came before the Court, Delaware was the lone jurisdiction whose courts had ordered integration, and so was affirmed rather than reversed by the Brown decision.

=== Federal judicial service ===
Seitz was nominated by President Lyndon B. Johnson on February 28, 1966, to a seat on the United States Court of Appeals for the Third Circuit vacated by Judge John Biggs Jr. He was confirmed by the United States Senate on June 9, 1966, and received his commission on the same day. He served as Chief Judge from 1971 to 1984. He was a member of the Judicial Conference of the United States from 1971 to 1984. He assumed senior status on June 1, 1989.

== Personal ==
Seitz and his wife, Virginia Day, were married for 43 years. They had four children, two of whom went on to noted legal careers of their own: a daughter, Virginia A. Seitz, is a well-known attorney, formerly at the Office of Legal Counsel of the United States Department of Justice, and now at Sidley Austin. A son, Collins J. Seitz Jr., is the Chief Justice of the Delaware Supreme Court. C.J. Seitz Jr. was a founding partner at the Delaware law firm of Seitz Ross Aronstam & Moritz. A brother, John F. R. Seitz, was a career United States Army officer who served as a colonel in World War II and retired at the grade of major general.

Seitz died at a retirement home in Wilmington on October 16, 1998, aged 84.

== Recognition ==
In January 2025, President Joe Biden posthumously awarded Seitz the Presidential Citizens Medal, for the significance of his ruling in the Gebhart case.

== Sources ==
Legal offices
Preceded by John Biggs Jr.	Judge of the United States Court of Appeals for the Third Circuit; 1966–1989	Succeeded by Jane Richards Roth
Preceded by William H. Hastie	Chief Judge of the United States Court of Appeals for the Third Circuit; 1971–1984	Succeeded by Ruggero J. Aldisert
Preceded by A. Leon Higginbotham Jr.	Presiding Judge of the United States Foreign Intelligence Surveillance Court of Review; 1987–1994	Succeeded by Paul Hitch Roney
