= Gerald McLaughlin =

American judge (1893–1977)

Senior Judge of the United States Court of Appeals for the Third Circuit
- In office July 15, 1968 – December 6, 1977

Judge of the United States Court of Appeals for the Third Circuit
- In office June 14, 1943 – July 15, 1968
- Appointed by: Franklin D. Roosevelt
- Preceded by: William Clark
- Succeeded by: John Joseph Gibbons

Personal details
- Born: Gerald McLaughlin; May 11, 1893 Newark, New Jersey, U.S.
- Died: December 6, 1977 (aged 84)
- Education: Fordham University (AB, LLB)

Gerald McLaughlin (May 11, 1893 – December 6, 1977) was a United States circuit judge of the United States Court of Appeals for the Third Circuit.

== Education and career ==
Born in Newark, New Jersey, McLaughlin received an Artium Baccalaureus degree from Fordham University in 1914, and a Bachelor of Laws from Fordham University School of Law in 1917. He served in the United States Army during World War I and thereafter was in private practice in Newark from 1919 to 1943.

== Federal judicial service ==
McLaughlin was nominated by President Franklin D. Roosevelt on May 24, 1943, to a seat on the United States Court of Appeals for the Third Circuit vacated by Judge William Clark. He was confirmed by the United States Senate on June 8, 1943, and received his commission on June 14, 1943. He assumed senior status on July 15, 1968, serving in that status until his death on December 6, 1977.

== Sources ==
Legal offices
Preceded by William Clark	Judge of the United States Court of Appeals for the Third Circuit; 1943–1968	Succeeded by John Joseph Gibbons
