= Vincent P. Biunno =

American judge (1916–1991)

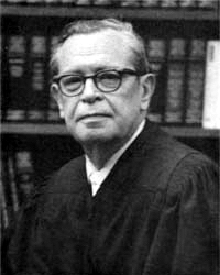

Senior Judge of the United States District Court for the District of New Jersey
- In office March 23, 1982 – July 30, 1991

Judge of the United States District Court for the District of New Jersey
- In office April 17, 1973 – March 23, 1982
- Appointed by: Richard Nixon
- Preceded by: Robert Shaw
- Succeeded by: John Winslow Bissell

Personal details
- Born: Vincent Pasquale Biunno; January 2, 1916 Newark, New Jersey
- Died: July 30, 1991 (aged 75) Passaic, New Jersey
- Party: Republican
- Education: Rutgers Law School (LL.B.)

Vincent Pasquale Biunno (February 2, 1916 – July 30, 1991) was a United States district judge of the United States District Court for the District of New Jersey.

== Education and career ==
Born in Newark, New Jersey, Biunno received a Bachelor of Laws from Rutgers Law School in 1937. He was in private practice in Newark from 1937 to 1958, also serving as a private in the United States Army during World War II, from 1942 to 1943, and as a counselor and lecturer at the Rutgers Law School from 1954 to 1957. He was chosen to be chief counsel to New Jersey Governor Robert B. Meyner in 1958, despite being a registered Republican. He served in this capacity until 1960, reportedly turning down a Superior Court appointment and instead returning to private practice. From 1960 to 1973, he was a Director of the Prudential Insurance Company in Newark.

== Federal judicial service ==
On February 21, 1973, Biunno was nominated by President Richard Nixon to a seat on the United States District Court for the District of New Jersey vacated by Judge Robert Shaw. Biunno was confirmed by the United States Senate on April 10, 1973, and received his commission on April 17, 1973. He assumed senior status due to a certified disability on March 23, 1982, serving in that capacity until his death on July 30, 1991, in Passaic, New Jersey.

== Sources ==
Legal offices
Preceded by Robert Shaw	Judge of the United States District Court for the District of New Jersey; 1973–1982	Succeeded by John Winslow Bissell
