= William H. Hastie =

American judge (1904–1976)

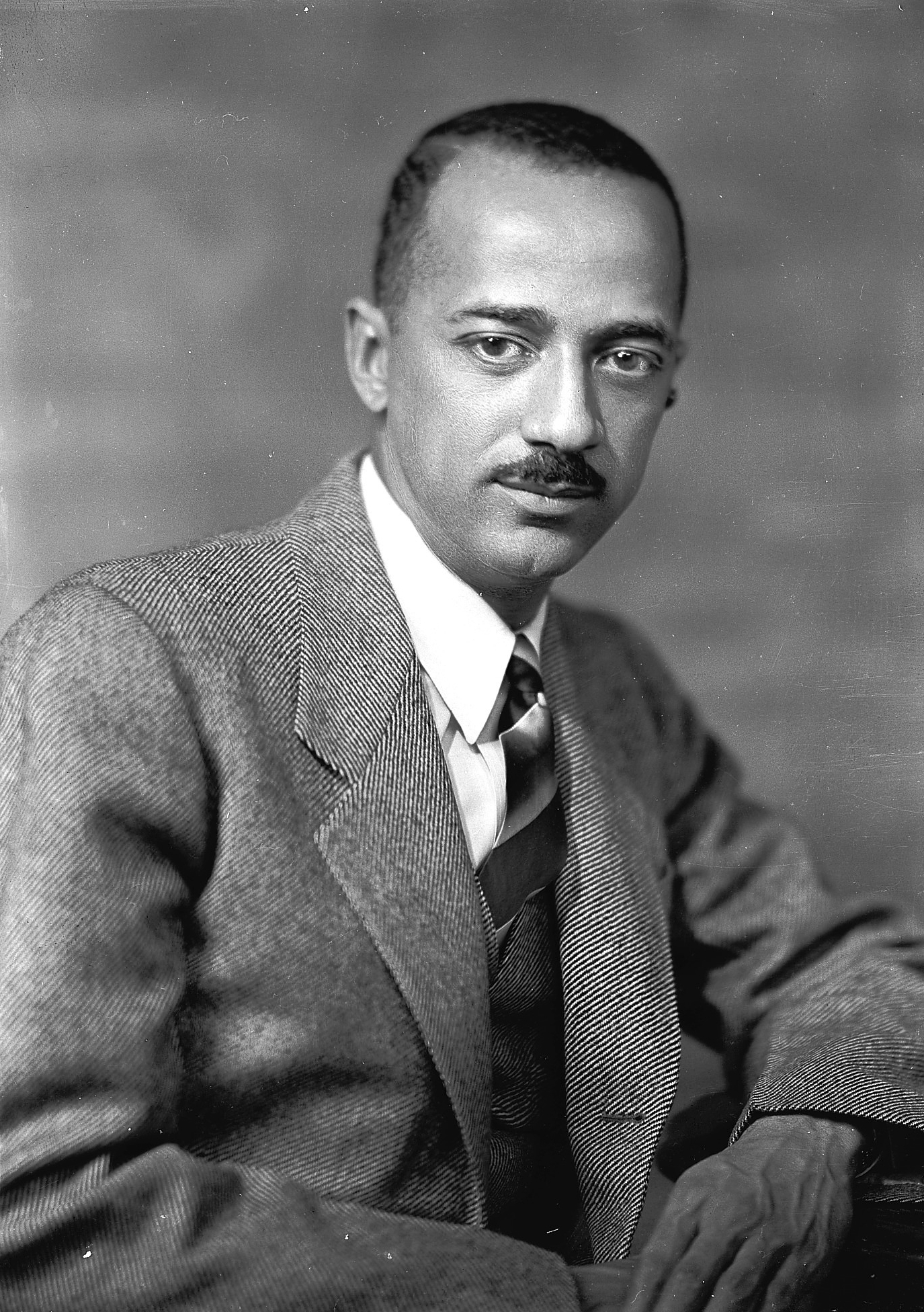
- Portrait by Addison N. Scurlock c. 1949

Senior Judge of the United States Court of Appeals for the Third Circuit
- In office May 31, 1971 – April 14, 1976

Judge of the United States Court of Appeals for the Third Circuit
- In office October 21, 1949 – May 31, 1971
- Appointed by: Harry S. Truman
- Preceded by: Seat established
- Succeeded by: James Rosen

Governor of the United States Virgin Islands
- In office May 17, 1946 – October 21, 1949
- Preceded by: Charles Harwood
- Succeeded by: Morris Fidanque de Castro

Judge of the United States District Court of the Virgin Islands
- In office March 26, 1937 – July 1, 1939
- Appointed by: Franklin D. Roosevelt
- Preceded by: George Philip Jones
- Succeeded by: Herman Moore

Personal details
- Born: William Henry Hastie Jr. November 17, 1904 Knoxville, Tennessee, U.S.
- Died: April 14, 1976 (aged 71) East Norriton Township, Pennsylvania, U.S.
- Party: Democratic
- Relations: Charles Hamilton Houston (cousin)
- Education: Amherst College (BA); Harvard University (LLB, SJD)

William Henry Hastie Jr. (November 17, 1904 – April 14, 1976) was an American lawyer, judge, educator, public official, and civil rights advocate. He was the first African American to serve as Governor of the United States Virgin Islands, as a federal judge, and as a federal appellate judge. He served as a United States circuit judge of the United States Court of Appeals for the Third Circuit and previously served as District Judge of the District Court of the Virgin Islands.

== Early life and education ==
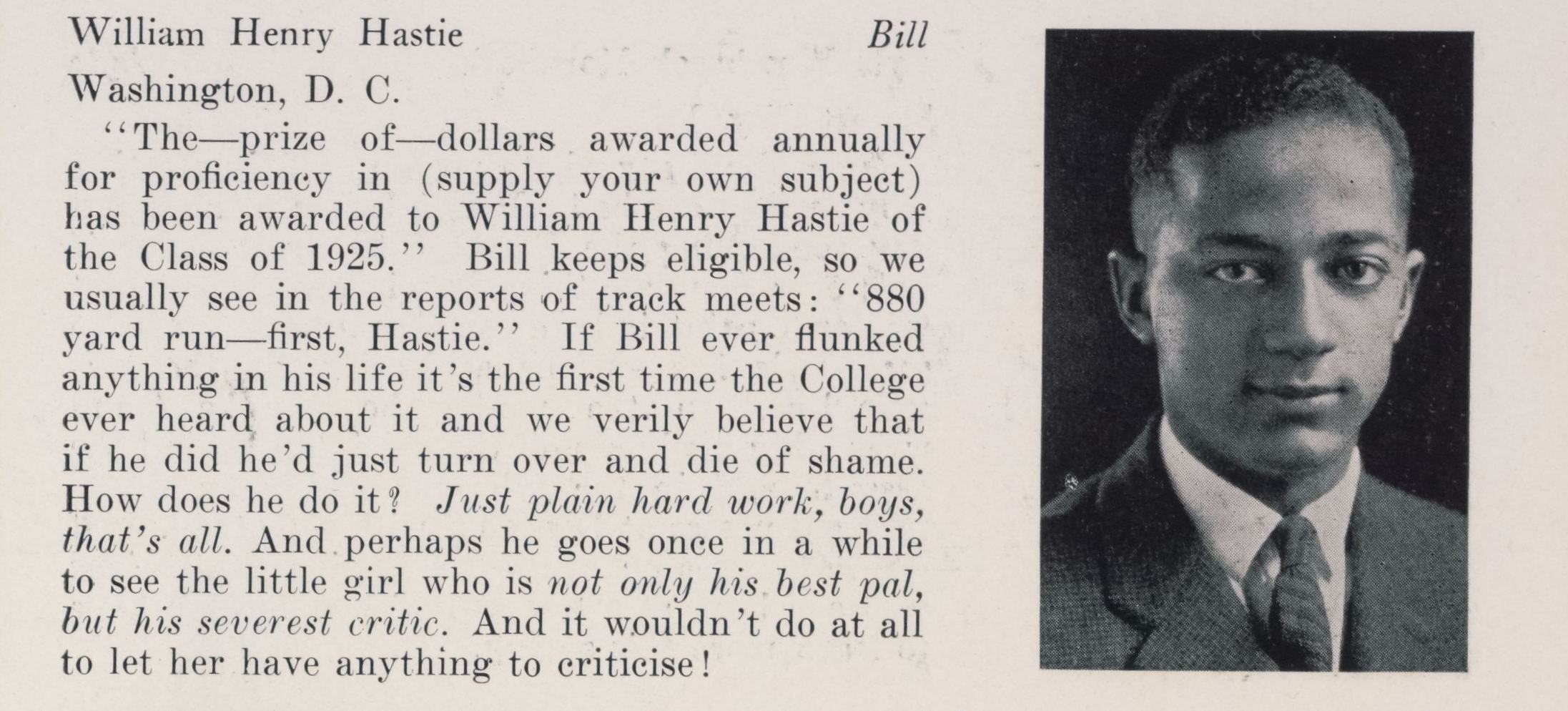
Hastie in the Amherst College yearbook, 1925

Hastie was born in Knoxville, Tennessee, the son of William Henry Hastie, Sr. and Roberta Childs. His ancestors were African American. Family tradition held that one female ancestor was a Malagasy princess. He graduated from Dunbar High School, a top academic school for black students.

Hastie attended Amherst College, Massachusetts in 1925, where he graduated first in his class, magna cum laude, and Phi Beta Kappa, receiving a Bachelor of Arts degree. While in college, Hastie was initiated into Omega Psi Phi fraternity. He received a Bachelor of Laws from Harvard Law School in 1930, followed by a Doctor of Juridical Science from the same institution in 1933.

== Career ==
=== Legal work ===
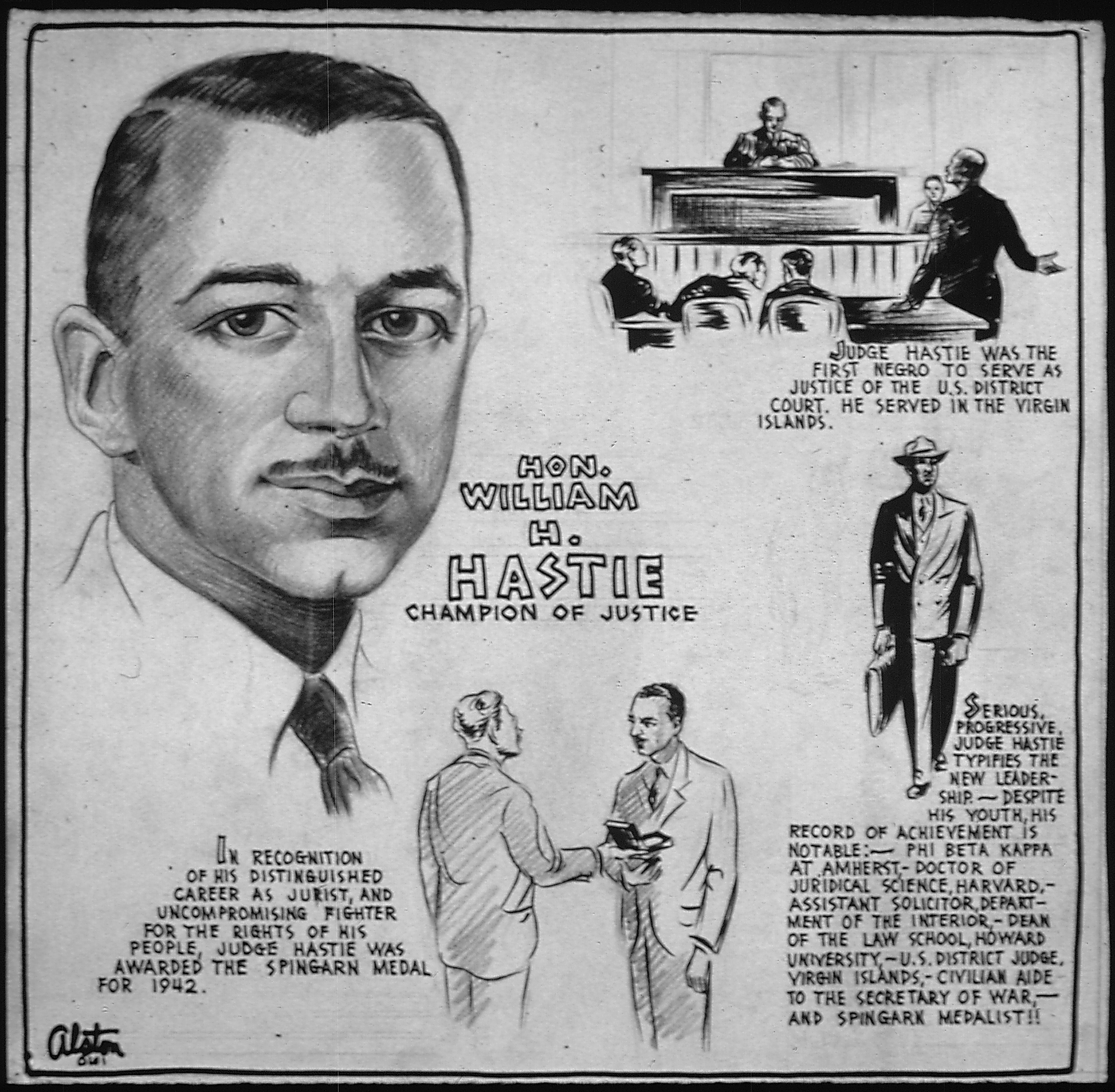
Poster of Hastie from the United States Office of War Information, Domestic Operations Branch, News Bureau, in 1943

Hastie entered the private practice of law in Washington, D.C. from 1930 to 1933. From 1933 to 1937 he served as assistant solicitor for the United States Department of the Interior, advising the agency on racial issues. He had worked with his second cousin, Charles Hamilton Houston, to establish a joint law practice. Hastie served as a member of the informal "Black Cabinet" of President Franklin D. Roosevelt from 1933 to 1937.

In 1937, Roosevelt appointed Hastie to the District Court of the Virgin Islands, making Hastie the first African-American federal judge. This was a controversial action; Democratic United States Senator William H. King of Utah, the Chairman of the United States Senate Committee on the Judiciary called Hastie's appointment a "blunder." King opposed any nominee who supported Black equality.

In 1939, Hastie resigned from the court to become the Dean of the Howard University School of Law, where he had previously taught. One of his students was Thurgood Marshall, who led the Legal Defense Fund for the NAACP and was appointed as a United States Supreme Court Justice.

Hastie served as a co-lead lawyer with Thurgood Marshall in the voting rights case of Smith v. Allwright, 321 U.S. 649 (1944) in which the Supreme Court ruled against white primaries. One of Houston's sons became a name partner at the law firm.

=== World War II ===
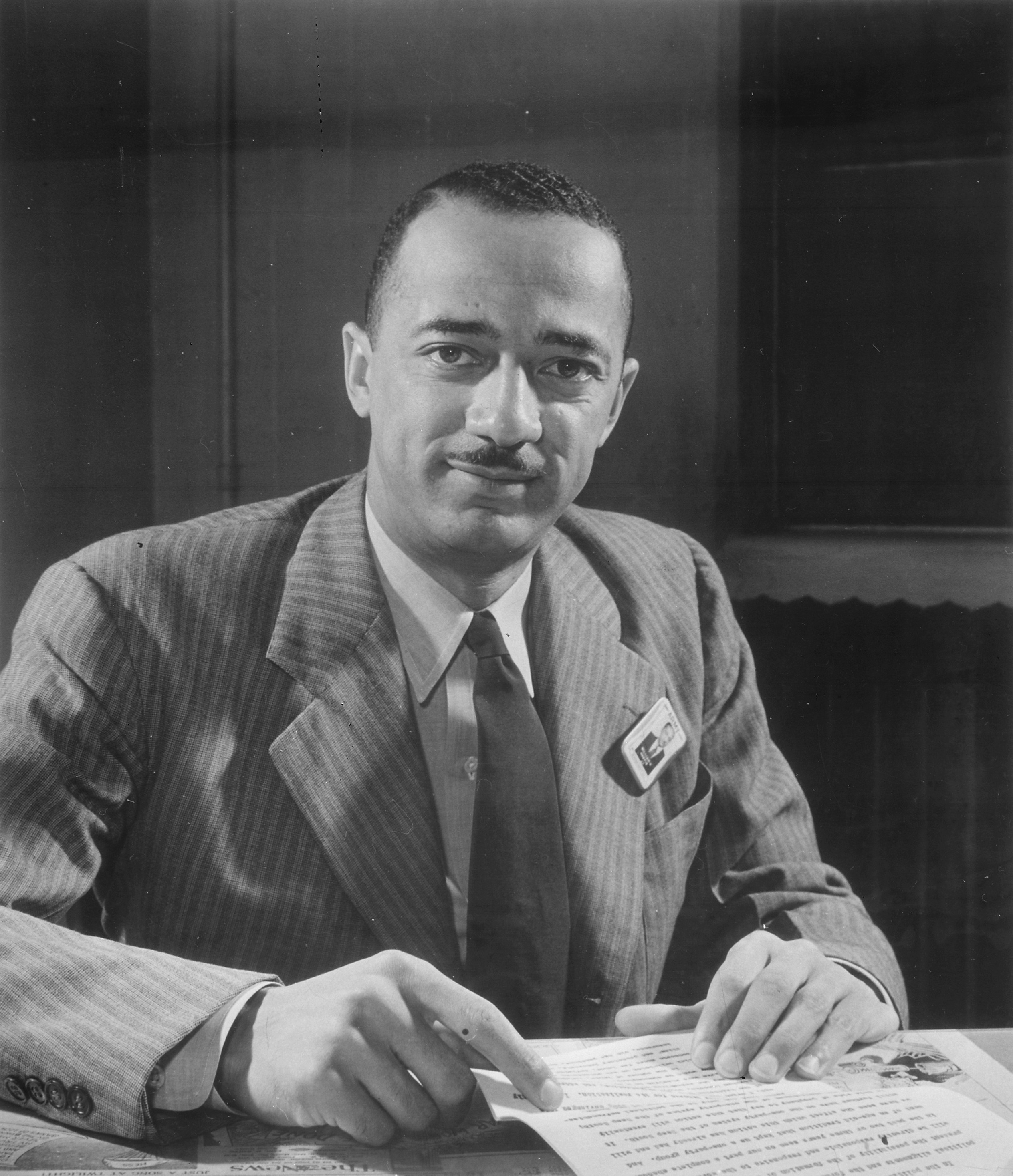
Hastie as dean of the Howard University Law School and civilian aide to the Secretary of War c. 1941

During World War II, Hastie worked as a civilian aide to the United States Secretary of War Henry Stimson from 1940 to 1942. He vigorously advocated the equal treatment of African Americans in the United States Army and their unrestricted use in the war effort.

On January 15, 1943, Hastie resigned his position in protest against racially segregated training facilities in the United States Army Air Forces, inadequate training for African-American pilots, and the unequal distribution of assignments between whites and non-whites. That same year, he received the Spingarn Medal from the NAACP, both for his lifetime achievements and in recognition of this protest action.

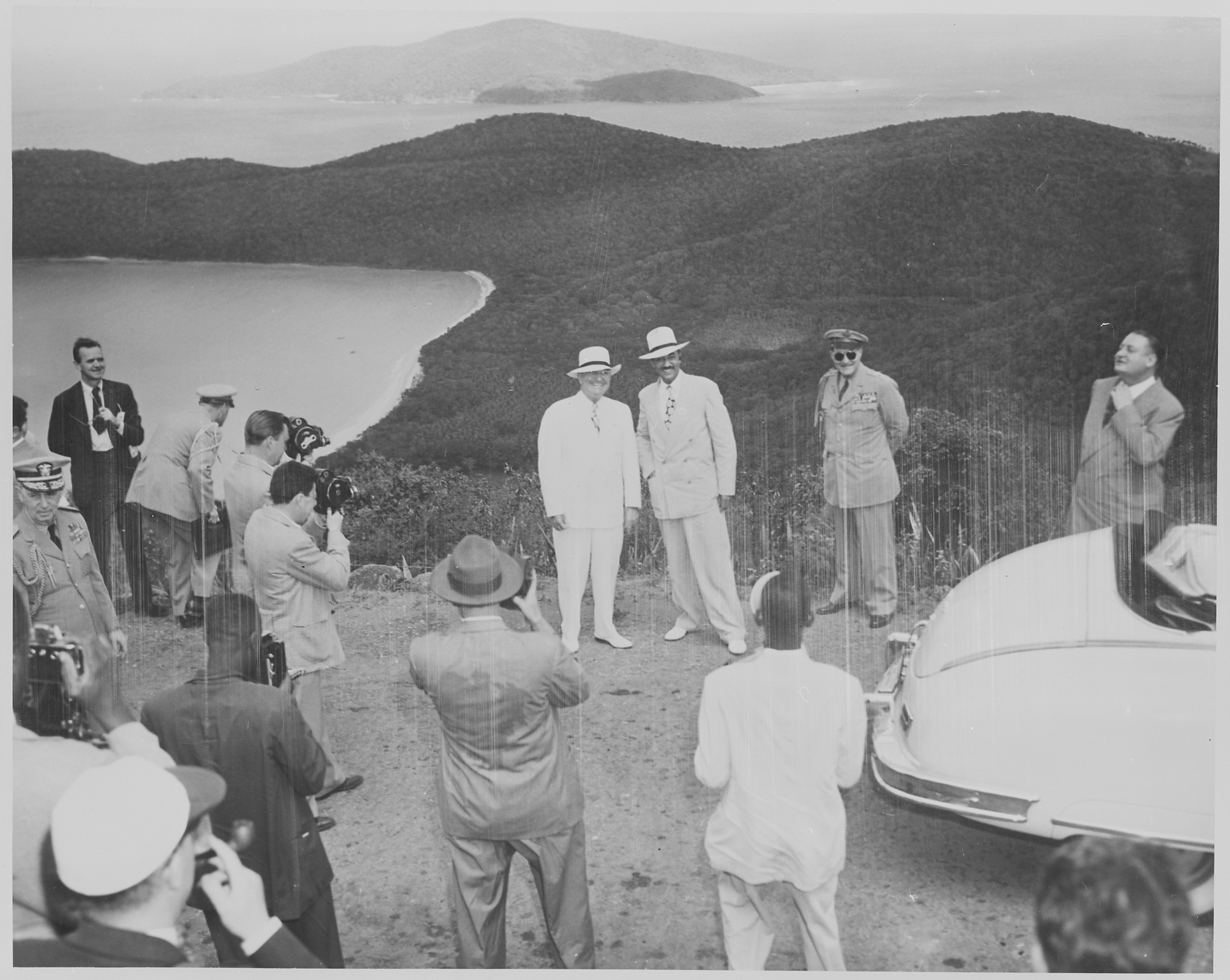
Hastie with President Harry S. Truman at Drake's Seat, on the island of Saint Thomas in the Virgin Islands, February 22, 1948

In 1946, President Harry S. Truman appointed Hastie as Territorial Governor of the United States Virgin Islands. He was the first African American to hold this position. Hastie served as governor from 1946 to 1949.

=== Federal judicial service ===
Hastie received a recess appointment from President Harry S. Truman on October 21, 1949, to the United States Court of Appeals for the Third Circuit, to a new seat authorized by 63 Stat. 493, becoming the first African-American federal appellate judge. He was nominated to the same position by President Truman on January 5, 1950. He was confirmed by the United States Senate on July 19, 1950, and received his commission on July 22, 1950. He served as Chief officer as a member of the Judicial Conference of the United States from 1968 to 1971. He assumed senior status on May 31, 1971. He was a Judge of the Temporary Emergency Court of Appeals from 1972 to 1976. His service terminated on April 14, 1976, when he died of a heart attack in Philadelphia while he was playing golf. He was 71 years old.

=== Supreme Court consideration ===
As the first African American on the Federal bench, Hastie was considered as a possible candidate to be the first African-American Justice of the Supreme Court. In an interview with Robert Penn Warren for the book Who Speaks for the Negro?, Hastie commented that as a judge, he had not been able to be "out in the hustings, and to personally sample grassroots reaction" but that for the Civil Rights Movement to succeed, both class and race must be considered.

In 1962, President John F. Kennedy considered appointing Hastie to succeed retiring Justice Charles Whittaker. But due to political calculations he did not do so, as he believed that an African-American appointee would have faced fierce opposition in the United States Senate from Southerners such as James Eastland (D-Mississippi), the chairman of the Judiciary Committee. Conversely, on issues other than civil rights, Hastie was considered relatively moderate, and Chief Justice Earl Warren was reportedly "violently opposed" to Hastie, as he would be too conservative as a justice. Justice William O. Douglas reportedly told Robert F. Kennedy that Hastie would be "just one more vote for Frankfurter." Kennedy appointed Byron White instead.

Kennedy noted that he expected to make several more appointments to the Supreme Court in his presidency and that he intended to appoint Hastie to the Court at a later date.

== Legacy ==
Hastie was an elected member of both the American Academy of Arts and Sciences and the American Philosophical Society. The Third Circuit Library in Philadelphia is named in Hastie's honor. A permanent memorial room in his honor is hosted by The Beck Cultural Exchange Center in Knoxville, Tennessee, which also houses his personal papers. In addition, an urban natural area in South Knoxville is named in his honor.

In terms of African-American history, Hastie developed from a youthful radical to a scholarly, calm, almost aloof jurist. He said the judge always ought to be in the middle, for his basic responsibility "is to maintain neutrality while giving the best objective judgment of the contest between adversaries." He served as major influence for many lawyers and jurists, Judge Solomon Oliver Jr. was among those who clerked for him, and cites Hastie as his greatest influence. As a scion of an elite black family, he reflected its integrationist viewpoint. He said, "The Negro lawyer has played and continues to play, a very important role in the American Negro's struggle for equality." When he resigned as the top aide on racial matters to the War Department in 1943, he said it was caused by "reactionary policies and discriminatory practices in the Army and Air Forces."

Hastie's daughter, Karen Hastie Williams, was a prominent lawyer, and the first woman of colour appointed clerk to a U.S. Supreme Court Justice.

== Amherst Olio gallery ==
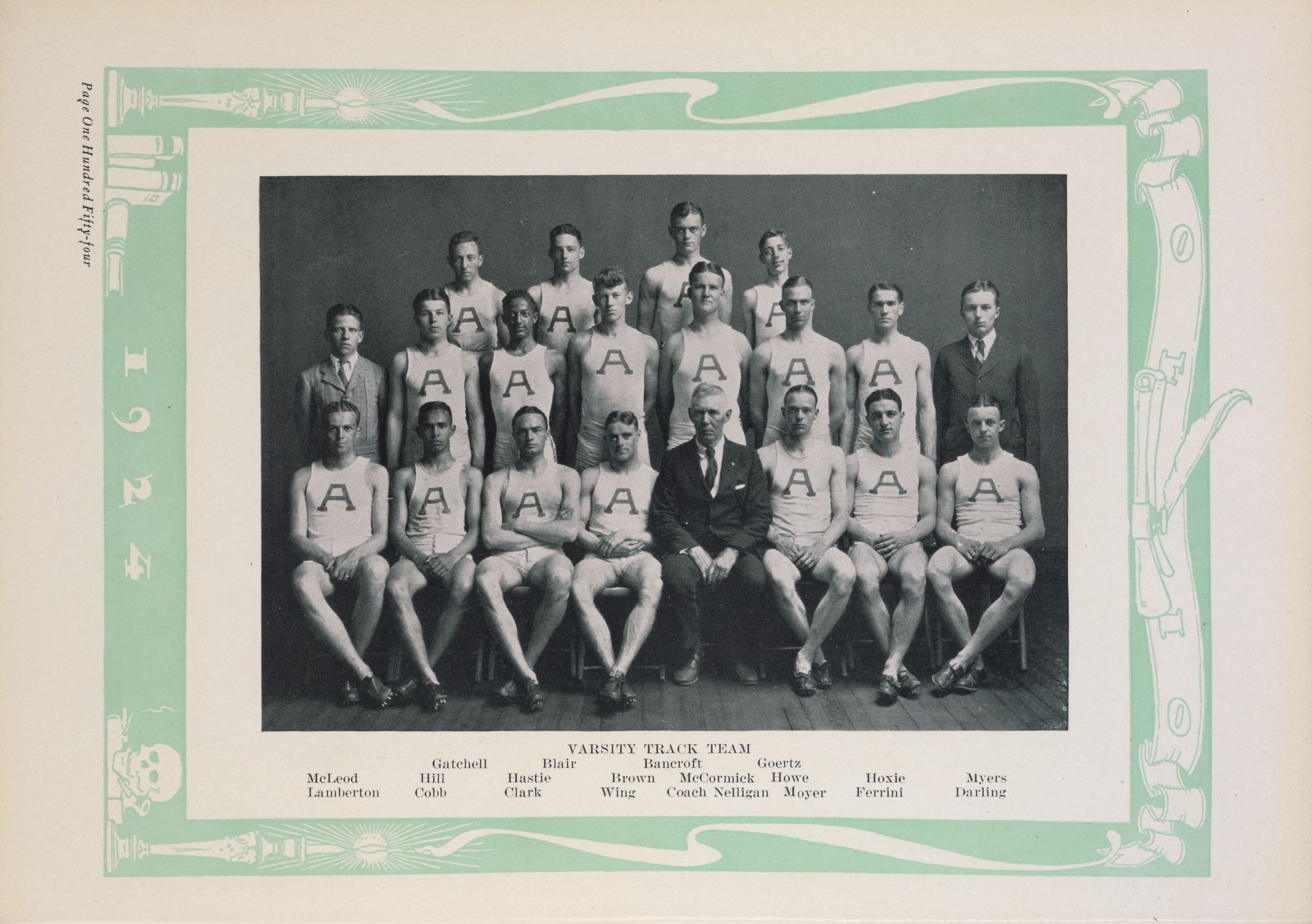
Varsity Track Team, 1922

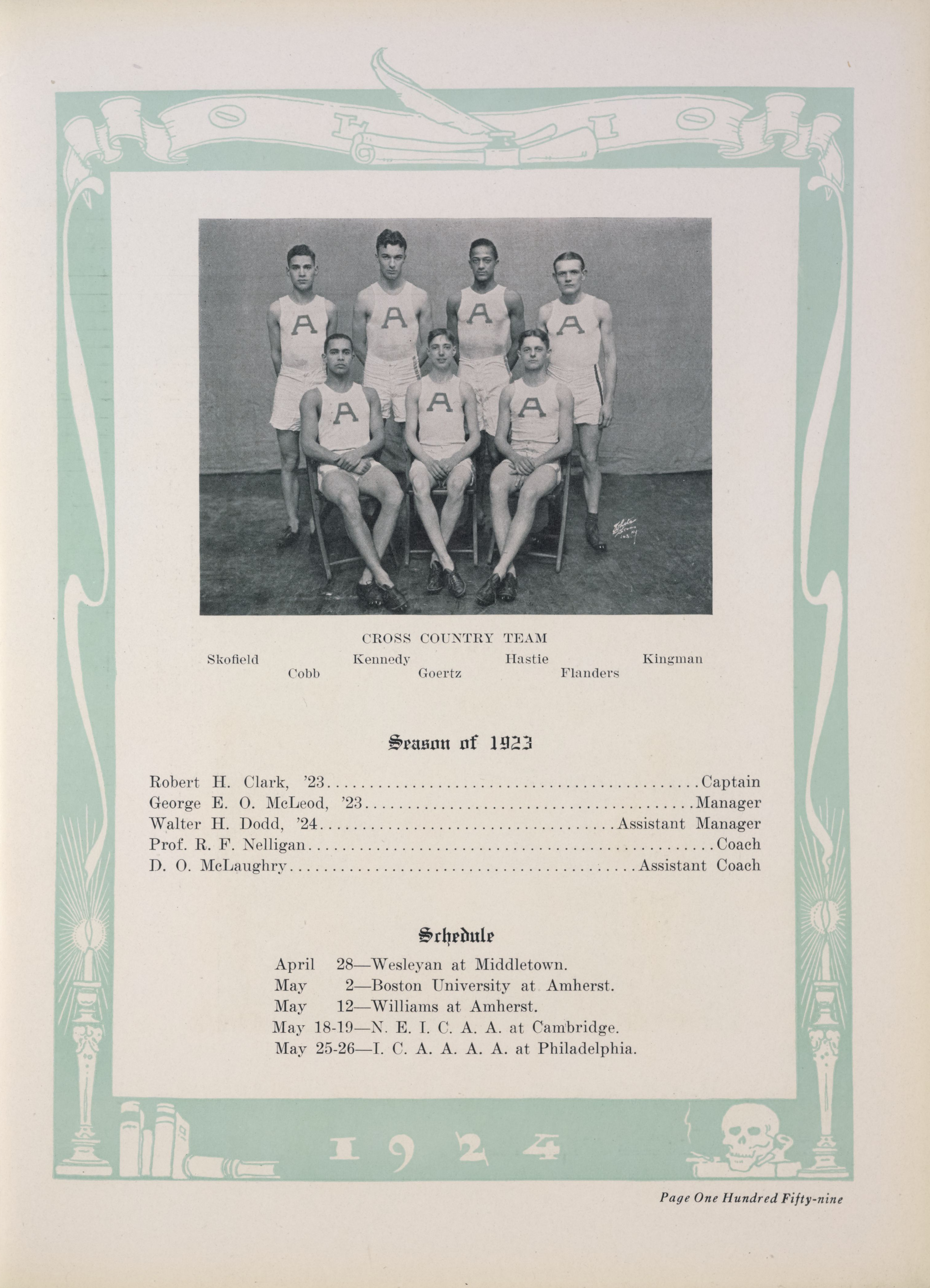
Cross Country Team, 1922

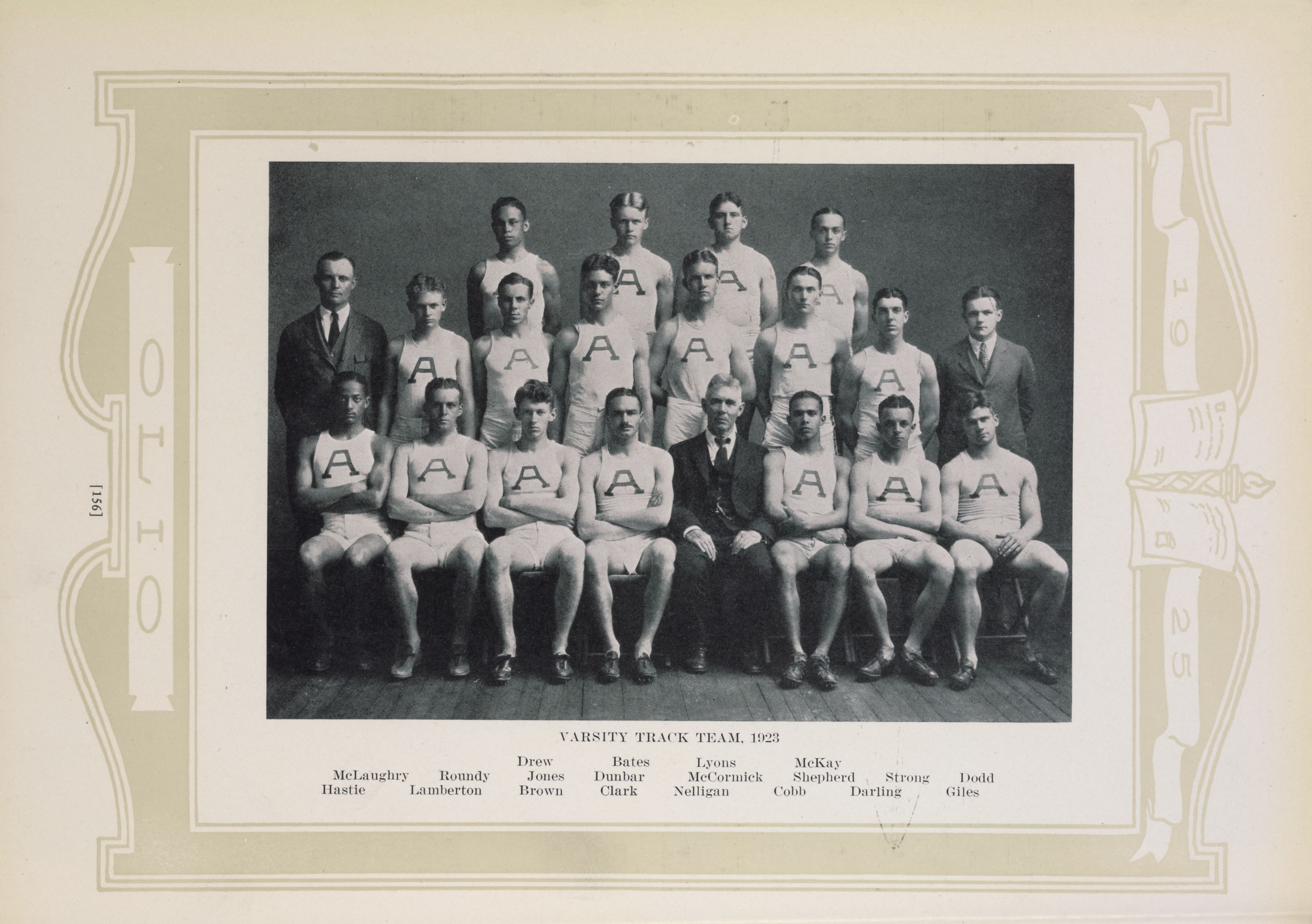
Varsity Track Team, 1923

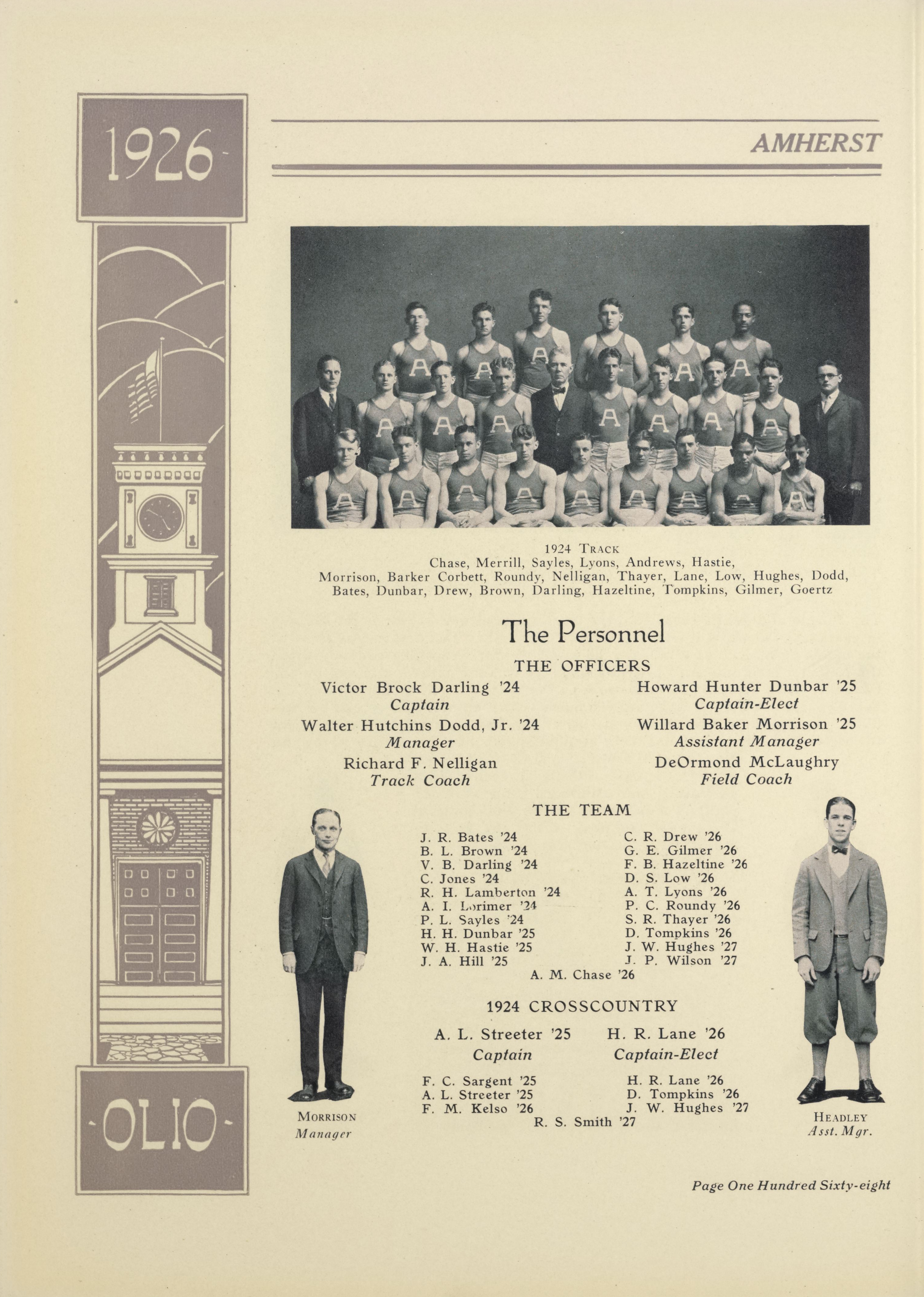
Varsity Track Team, 1924

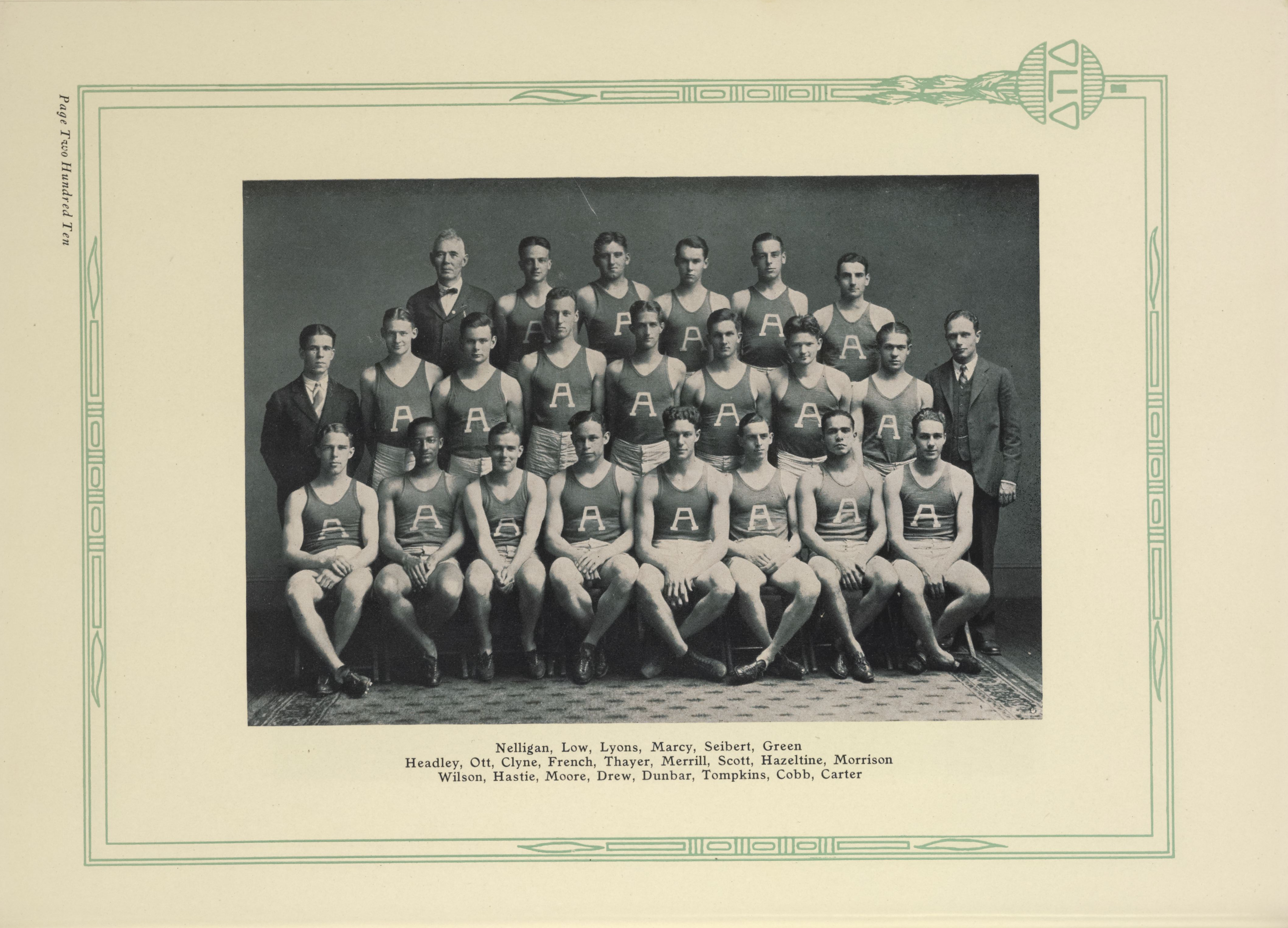
Varsity Track Team, 1925

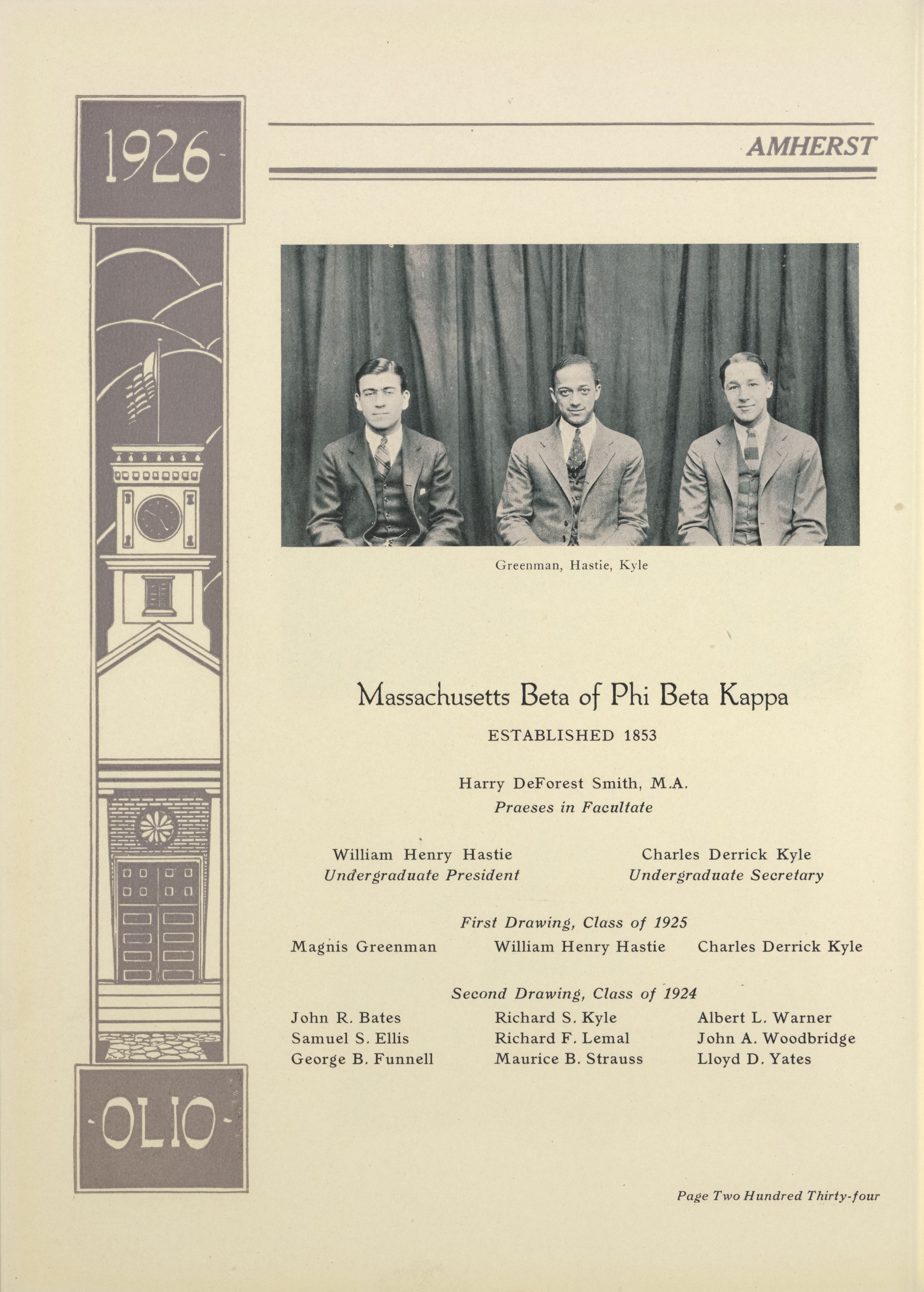
Massachusetts Beta of Phi Beta Kappa, 1925

== See also ==
- John F. Kennedy Supreme Court candidates
- List of African-American jurists
- List of African-American federal judges
- List of first minority male lawyers and judges in the United States

== Sources ==
- Childs, John Brown (2000). "Red Clay, Blue Hills: In Honor of My Ancestors". In Maurianne Adams; Rosie Castaneda; Madeline L. Peters; Ximena Zuniga; Warren J. Blumenfeld (eds.). Readings for Diversity and Social Justice : An Anthology on Racism, Sexism, Anti-Semitism, Heterosexsm, Classism, and Ableism (1 ed.). New York; London: Routledge. pp. 110–113. ISBN 0415926335.
- Associated Press (1937-03-02). "Hastie's Selection Termed 'Blunder'". The Washington Post. p. 17.
- Negro Soldiers Defended. New York Times. Oct 4, 1941. p. 14, 1 p
- Army Aide Quits; Protests Negro Pilot Treatment. Chicago Daily Tribune. Feb 1, 1943. p. 21, 1 p
- Hastie Nominated For Governorship Of Virgin Islands. The Washington Post. Jan 6, 1946. p. M1, 2 pp
- "Federal Judge Dies; Slave's Grandson". Los Angeles Times. 1976-04-15. p. 8. ISSN 0362-4331.
- "Judge William Hastie, 71, of Federal Court, Dies". The New York Times. 1976-04-15. p. 36. ISSN 0362-4331.

Legal offices
Preceded by George Philip Jones	Judge of the United States District Court of the Virgin Islands; 1937–1939	Succeeded by Herman Moore
New seat	Judge of the United States Court of Appeals for the Third Circuit; 1949–1971	Succeeded by James Rosen
Preceded by Austin Leander Staley	Chief Judge of the United States Court of Appeals for the Third Circuit; 1968–1971	Succeeded by Collins J. Seitz
Political offices
Preceded by Charles Harwood	Governor of the United States Virgin Islands; 1946–1949	Succeeded by Morris Fidanque de Castro
