= William W. Knox =

American judge (1911–1981)

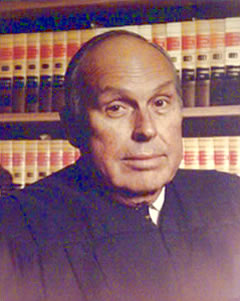

Judge of the United States District Court for the Western District of Pennsylvania
- In office October 14, 1970 – August 30, 1981
- Appointed by: Richard Nixon
- Preceded by: Seat established by 84 Stat. 294
- Succeeded by: Carol Los Mansmann

Personal details
- Born: William W. Knox; June 18, 1911 Erie, Pennsylvania, U.S.
- Died: August 30, 1980 (aged 69) Erie, Pennsylvania, U.S.
- Education: University of Michigan (A.B., J.D.)

William W. Knox (June 18, 1911 – August 30, 1981) was a United States district judge of the United States District Court for the Western District of Pennsylvania.

== Education and career ==
Born in Erie, Pennsylvania, Knox received an Artium Baccalaureus degree from the University of Michigan in 1932 and a Juris Doctor from the University of Michigan Law School in 1935. He was in private practice in Erie from 1935 to 1970.

== Federal judicial service ==
On September 28, 1970, Knox was nominated by President Richard Nixon to a new seat on the United States District Court for the Western District of Pennsylvania created by 84 Stat. 294. He was confirmed by the United States Senate on October 8, 1970, and received his commission on October 14, 1970. Knox served in that capacity until his death, on August 30, 1981, in Erie.

== Sources ==
Legal offices
Preceded by Seat established by 84 Stat. 294	Judge of the United States District Court for the Western District of Pennsylvania; 1970–1981	Succeeded by Carol Los Mansmann
