= John Joseph Gibbons =

American judge (1924–2018)

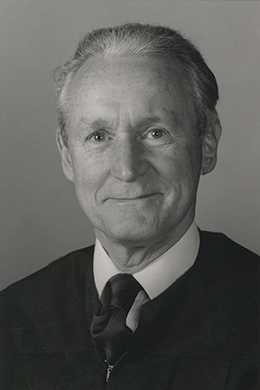
- Official portrait, 1987

Chief Judge of the United States Court of Appeals for the Third Circuit
- In office January 1, 1987 – January 15, 1990
- Preceded by: Ruggero J. Aldisert
- Succeeded by: A. Leon Higginbotham Jr.

Judge of the United States Court of Appeals for the Third Circuit
- In office December 18, 1969 – January 15, 1990
- Appointed by: Richard Nixon
- Preceded by: Gerald McLaughlin
- Succeeded by: Samuel Alito

Personal details
- Born: December 8, 1924 Newark, New Jersey, U.S.
- Died: December 9, 2018 (aged 94) Maplewood, New Jersey, U.S.
- Education: College of the Holy Cross (BS); Harvard University (LLB)

Military service
- Branch/service: United States Navy
- Years of service: 1943–1946
- Battles/wars: World War II

John Joseph Gibbons (December 8, 1924 – December 9, 2018) was an American jurist who served as a federal appellate judge on the United States Court of Appeals for the Third Circuit from 1969 to 1990, during which time he served as its chief judge from 1987 to 1990.

== Early life and education ==
Gibbons was born in Newark, New Jersey, on December 8, 1924, and was raised in nearby Belleville. His father was a dispatcher for a local brewery, and his mother was a hair stylist. After graduating from Saint Benedict's Preparatory School in 1942, he served in the United States Navy during World War II from 1943 to 1946. His service included a posting at the United States naval base at Guantánamo Bay, Cuba.

After his naval service, Gibbons graduated from the College of the Holy Cross with a Bachelor of Science in 1947. As an undergraduate at Holy Cross, he wrote a senior thesis titled, "Federal control of narcotic drugs." He then entered Harvard Law School, graduating with his Bachelor of Laws (LL.B.), cum laude, in 1950. While at Harvard, he served as an editor of the Harvard Law Review for two years. He was also a finalist in the Ames Moot Court Competition alongside classmate William Judson Holloway Jr.

== Early career ==
After graduating from Harvard Law School in 1950, Gibbons was admitted to the New Jersey bar and joined the Newark law firm of Crummy & Consodine, a predecessor of the firm now known as Gibbons P.C. He became a partner in 1954, after which the firm was renamed Crummy, Consodine & Gibbons. Although the firm developed a substantial commercial practice, particularly in corporate and bankruptcy law, Gibbons later described his own work between 1950 and 1970 as encompassing both civil and criminal litigation in state and federal courts. His early appellate work included appearances before the Supreme Court of New Jersey and the New Jersey Superior Court, Appellate Division.

Alongside his private practice, Gibbons was an early member of the faculty of Seton Hall University School of Law, which opened in Newark in 1951. He was among the youngest practicing lawyers recruited to teach at the new law school, and remained there for six years. He was one of the founding members of its law faculty and taught constitutional law and federal courts while still in private practice.

== New Jersey Bar Association (1960–1968) ==
In 1960, the Supreme Court of New Jersey appointed Gibbons to the New Jersey Board of Bar Examiners, and he became chairman of the board in 1963. He was elected a trustee of the New Jersey State Bar Association in 1961 and subsequently served as an officer of the organization. By the summer of 1967, he was serving as president of the state bar association.

Gibbons's bar presidency coincided with the 1967 Newark riots, during which more than 1,400 people were arrested and local jails became overcrowded. Gibbons persuaded Newark authorities to provide detained people with access to the courts and organized lawyers to assist those who lacked representation. His firm dispatched attorneys to local courthouses to accelerate the processing of bail applications and help reduce overcrowding in the jails. Gibbons's response to the riots provided legal representation to those who could not afford counsel.

In August 1967, Governor Richard J. Hughes established the ten-member Governor's Select Commission on Civil Disorder to investigate the cause of the unrest in Newark and other New Jersey cities and appointed Gibbons as one of its members. The commission heard testimony from more than 100 witnesses during its five-month investigation and issued its findings and recommendations in the report Report for Action in February 1968. In 1968, Hughes also appointed Gibbons to the New Jersey Council Against Crime and to the council of the New Jersey Department of Community Affairs.

== Federal judicial service ==
Gibbons was nominated to the United States Court of Appeals for the Third Circuit by President Richard Nixon on December 5, 1969, to a seat vacated by Judge Gerald McLaughlin. Gibbons was confirmed by the Senate on December 17, 1969, and received his commission on December 18, 1969. He served as Chief Judge of the Third Circuit between 1987 and 1990 and retired on January 15, 1990. During his judicial tenure, Gibbons wrote more than 800 legal opinions.

== Post-judicial career ==
Gibbons returned to the firm bearing his name in 1990 (which was then renamed Gibbons, Del Deo, Dolan, Griffinger & Vecchione), and founded the John J. Gibbons Fellowship in Public Interest & Constitutional Law. He also taught constitutional law at Seton Hall University School of Law until 1997. Gibbons was involved in defending 660 of the detainees at the Guantanamo Bay detention camp. He successfully opposed their detention without judicial review.

He also worked as a mediator and arbitrator in commercial disputes between large corporations and in litigation in the fields of antitrust, intellectual property law and securities regulation. He was a member of the American Bar Association's house of delegates and was chairman of its Committee on Fair Trial and Free Press.

Gibbons was named "lawyer of the year" by the New Jersey Law Journal in 2004 and received a lifetime achievement award from The American Lawyer in 2005. In 2006 he was named on the National Law Journal's list of "100 most influential lawyers". Gibbons was appointed a life member of the American Law Institute and was also a fellow of the American Bar Foundation. He was a director of the American Arbitration Association and trustee emeritus of both the Practicing Law Institute and Holy Cross College and a trustee of the Fund for New Jersey. Gibbons died in Maplewood, New Jersey, on December 9, 2018, the day after his 94th birthday.

Legal offices
Preceded by Gerald McLaughlin	Judge of the United States Court of Appeals for the Third Circuit; 1969–1990	Succeeded by Samuel Alito
Preceded by Ruggero J. Aldisert	Chief Judge of the United States Court of Appeals for the Third Circuit; 1987–1990	Succeeded by A. Leon Higginbotham Jr.
