= Deaths of John and Joyce Sheridan =

Mysterious death of American couple

- Date: September 28, 2014
- Location: Skillman, New Jersey, U.S.; 40.42156°N 74.66606°W
- Deaths: 2
- Coroner: Dr. Eddy Vilavois

On September 28, 2014, John Sheridan, a former New Jersey Transportation Commissioner and health care executive, was found dead along with his wife Joyce in their home in Skillman, New Jersey, United States. The bodies were found in the house's master bedroom by firefighters responding to a fire emergency, with both exhibiting stab wounds. The case was initially believed by the Somerset County prosecutor's office to have been a murder-suicide and they wrote a public report to this effect.

However, even before the official report's release, the Sheridans' sons challenged this conclusion. Based on a second autopsy performed by forensic pathologist Michael Baden, who wrote his own report, he believed it was more likely that their parents had been murdered by an intruder who set the fire in an attempt to destroy evidence. The Sheridan sons exercised considerable political influence to have the finding of murder-suicide overturned; a 2016 open letter to change the finding, addressed to newly appointed state medical examiner Andrew Falzon, was signed by 200 prominent state residents, including three former governors and two former state attorneys general. In 2017 Falzon officially changed the manner of John Sheridan's death from suicide to undetermined. Five years later, State Attorney General Matt Platkin reopened the case after guilty pleas in a similar murder also involving political connections.

The Sheridans sons' efforts to change the verdict revealed a number of deficiencies in the state medical examiner's office generally and the investigation of the Sheridans' deaths specifically. Before Falzon's appointment, the position had been vacant for six years following the resignation of a predecessor who had resigned out of frustration with the system and himself replaced another predecessor who resigned for the same reason. The pathologist who performed the original autopsies was not board certified, had resigned from a previous position due to a failure to inform police about a changed autopsy finding and may have yielded to pressure from the prosecutor's office. One of the detectives who had initially been part of the investigation filed a whistleblower lawsuit, later dismissed, alleging he had been subject to retaliation after he had complained about how evidence related to the case was either mishandled or destroyed.

== Background ==
John Sheridan, a senior partner in the Morristown law firm of Riker, Danzig, Scherer, Hyland & Perretti, was a lifelong Republican whose career in New Jersey state government during the 1970s had culminated in his service as Transportation Commissioner in the cabinet of Governor Thomas Kean from 1982 to 1985. In that capacity he had overseen the transfer of the state's commuter rail service from federally-owned Conrail to the newly created New Jersey Transit Rail Operations. Sheridan later served on the transition teams for Republican governors Christine Todd Whitman and Chris Christie following their elections.

Sheridan and his wife Joyce had settled in Skillman, an affluent section of Montgomery Township in Somerset County, a short distance north of Princeton, in 1977. There they had raised four sons, twins Mark and Matt, Dan, and Tim. Mark himself followed in his father's footsteps, reaching the level of senior partner in the law firm Squire Patton Boggs and serving as chief counsel to New Jersey's Republican Party.

In 2005, John Sheridan had left Riker Danzig to take over as chief executive officer of Cooper University Hospital in Camden. Working together with the chairman of the hospital's board, George Norcross, a prominent Democratic leader in South Jersey, he oversaw an expansion of the hospital into what is today called Cooper Health System. The new facilities included a four-year medical college and cancer center.

Sheridan was also chair of a Camden non-profit, Cooper's Ferry Partnership (CFP), that owned parcels of land in the city that it attempted to redevelop. The largest was a 17-acre (6.9 ha) stretch of the city's waterfront called L3, with some existing state-owned buildings, which had the potential to become highly valuable office space in the wake of a state law allowing tax breaks for development in Camden in order to create jobs in the economically distressed city, the state's poorest. In early 2014 a power struggle between Norcross and CFP leadership over a redevelopment proposal led to the ouster of some of the latter and L3 being sold to private developers closely allied with the Norcross family, an outcome Sheridan had tried to prevent. By the middle of 2014, Sheridan was being pressured to recuse himself from any involvement in the deal over allegations that his role as the CEO of both the hospital and CFP created a conflict of interest, an allegation his son Mark says was greatly exaggerated as the hospital had discussed merely renting space at L3, not buying any of it.

== Deaths ==
Shortly before dawn on September 28, 2014, local police and firefighters responded to a report of flames at the Sheridan residence on Meadow Run Drive. Smoke was coming from one area of the second floor that turned out to be the master bedroom. After entering through the unlocked front door, the firefighters went upstairs and easily put out the fire, fueled by gasoline that had been poured on the floor as an accelerant. Also on the floor, they found the bodies of John and Joyce Sheridan, lying face up. John was pronounced dead at the scene, as was Joyce after her body was taken to University Medical Center of Princeton at Plainsboro.

The can from which the gas had been poured was also nearby, along with matches and knives. A heavy wooden armoire, partially consumed by the fire, had fallen across John's body, blocking the door and breaking several of his ribs; his wife had suffered first- and second-degree burns over many parts of her body. Both bodies exhibited stab wounds.

Joyce had been stabbed 12 times, mostly on her head and hands; police photographer Barry Jansen described her appearance as "mutilated". One wound that pierced her aorta was found to be lethal; her death was thus called a homicide. John had only five such wounds, mostly on his neck and torso; one of the former had pierced his jugular vein and would have eventually been fatal without medical attention. Soot was found in John's lungs during the autopsy along with elevated carbon monoxide levels in his blood, suggesting he had been alive when the fire started. The medical examiner deferred listing a cause of death "pending further investigation."

A week later, a memorial service was held for John and Joyce at Patriot's Theater at the Trenton War Memorial. The surviving family was joined by hundreds of mourners, including Governor Christie and his predecessors Thomas Kean, Christie Whitman and Democrat Jim Florio. Many of the public officials present praised John Sheridan's career and accomplishments. "The city of Camden is a different place because of his vision," Norcross said. The actual funeral was private. At the time, full details of how the couple died had not been made public. It was known that they had died in a fire; shortly before the service it was disclosed that the fire had been set. Whitman recalled later that rumors were actively circulating: "This was just not the John and Joyce any of us knew."

== Investigation ==
Investigators clashed with the Sheridan family from the morning the bodies were found. Responding firefighters notified Matt Sheridan, who lived at the house with his parents but was away on a fishing trip at Fishers Island, New York, from which he began making his own way home. Matt in turn called his twin brother Mark, who at the time was celebrating his wedding anniversary with his wife at a hotel on New York City's Upper East Side. When Mark and his wife arrived they found his parents' house surrounded with crime scene tape and were denied entry.

On Mark's way to Skillman, he picked up his brother Tim and learned that Somerset County prosecutor Geoffrey Soriano was on the scene. Since he did not know Soriano personally, he called Chris Porrino, chief counsel to Governor Christie (and later the state's attorney general), who had appointed Soriano. (Note: In New Jersey, unlike most other U.S. states, the chief lawyer responsible for prosecuting criminal offenses at the county level is appointed by the governor and confirmed by the State Senate, to serve a five-year term, rather than being elected by the voters of the county.) Mark knew Porrino from his own work as chief counsel for the state GOP. Soriano called Mark as he arrived at the scene and told him that the fire appeared to be arson and that his parents had been fatally stabbed.

The Sheridan sons went to the police station for interviews. According to Mark, a couple of hours later, detectives inexplicably asked Matt if they could search his car, and he consented. They found a small quantity of cocaine inside. Matt was also in possession of a digital scale and plastic bags coated with white powder on the inside. Police put him under arrest but did not charge him at that time.

The Sheridans, all of whom made their way to the scene of the fire that morning, assumed that their parents had been killed by an intruder and that police would be searching for who might have done it. But within a week, Soriano's office made statements reassuring the public that there was no danger of further attacks. "We are quite confident that there exists no threat to either the immediate neighborhood or to the local community," his spokesman said. At a meeting with the brothers, Soriano and an assistant explained how investigators had concluded that murder-suicide was the most likely explanation for the couple's deaths. John's body, he told Mark, had hesitation wounds, commonly found on people committing suicide by cutting themselves. He also stated that detectives would be looking through the couple's phones, emails and other records for evidence of extramarital affairs, financial problems or domestic violence that might explain a murder-suicide, and which he believed from his experience would turn up.

All the Sheridan sons found the theory highly doubtful. They knew their parents well and had seen no sign of any issues between them that might have led to violence. Mark recalled being the only one of them defending Soriano, as he himself was "part of the system" and still wanted to give the prosecutor the benefit of the doubt: "I was probably the most naïve of all about that stuff." (Note: Mark said in 2022 that since then he has come to have less instinctive trust in the criminal justice system and more understanding of those with less political and financial resources than his family who might find themselves in the same situation.)

Mark said later that John had bought new suits and dress shirts, suggesting he had no immediate plans to end his life; John had also had a FaceTime video chat with one of his grandchildren at 5 p.m. the evening before his death and two hours later sent a detailed email to colleagues in preparation for an upcoming meeting. Joyce had also begun putting Halloween decorations on the interior and exterior of the house, as she did every year. Montgomery Township police records showed only one emergency call from the Sheridan house during the thirty-seven years the couple lived there, in response to a fall by Joyce in which she injured her hip.

After Soriano suggested they might want to have a second autopsy done privately since the county medical examiner's office "wasn't very good", according to Mark, the Sheridans hired Michael Baden, a well-known former forensic pathologist who had been the chief medical examiner for New York City and had hosted HBO's Autopsy, to assist and consult with deputy state medical examiner Eddy Lilavois. Baden and Lilavois agreed that the stab wounds to both bodies had been caused by the same knife. They could not determine whether that knife was one of the two recovered at the scene, both kitchen knives. One, in fact, was designed for slicing bread and therefore had a serrated blade with a rounded tip, features that would not have made it the best choice for stabbing someone. It was likelier that it had been a third knife which had perhaps not yet been found. (Note: Lilavois reportedly told Baden that he had determined at his initial autopsy that John's stab wounds did not match any of the knives found, but after he told the investigators this they said not to worry about it as the case was a murder-suicide.)

In addition to going through the Sheridans' records, detectives interviewed 180 friends, family and co-workers. Those efforts turned up nothing suggesting any major issues with either spouse that could have prompted the crime. The only sign that either of them might have had some reason to be unhappy was from John's job. According to Cooper's chief counsel, Gary Lesneski, John was worried about the effect an upcoming state report on high fatality rates at the hospital's cardiac unit, which they expected to be very negative, might have. But Lesneski said he had left it as a work issue for the weekend, and one of his last emails, a lengthy response to a question from Norcross written the evening before the fire, was well-composed and lengthy, typical of John and showing no sign its author was emotionally distressed.

The toxicology report on John and Joyce yielded no new information. John's blood had the signs of the heart medication he took, and Joyce had a high level of prescription painkillers. This was due to the continuing consequences of a fall she incurred in her last year of work as a schoolteacher, around 1999, that had injured her back and required multiple surgeries and orthopedic treatments. "Mom was on enough meds to kill a small farm animal," Mark later told The New York Times Magazine.

DNA from the blood on the knives was tested but did not reveal anything conclusive. The amount collected was insufficient to test for anything more than the racial characteristics and gender of the source. The blood on them had come from a white male.

During the investigation, The Philadelphia Inquirer filed a lawsuit seeking disclosure of the case reports and other records related to it. The court sided with the state and kept them sealed.

=== Family questions ===
Around the time of Mark's meeting with Soriano, he and his brothers were allowed to re-enter the house as the investigation of the scene had concluded, four hours after it had begun. In the master bedroom, where the fire had been set, they found a melted lump of metal (Note: Soriano's report says the object was photographed, embedded in the floor, on the morning of the fire; investigators returned the next weekend to remove it.) next to where their father's body had been found.

The object was described as 2 by 6.5 inches (5.1 by 16.5 cm) and weighing 4.67 ounces (132.5 g). Lab tests revealed its composition to be primarily zinc with small amounts of aluminum and copper. What it had been was not certain, but the brothers believed it might have been the third knife, although it could have been a knob from the armoire as well. Baden's colleague, Henry Lee, said that zinc-based alloys are more commonly used in cast metal applications than knives and that its mass was not consistent with it having been a knife.

If the object was a knife, it was not part of the set of knives in the kitchen from which the other two had come. Their blades were made from chromium-iron alloys that required high temperatures to melt, temperatures that would only be achieved in a structure fire if it burned the whole house, or at least the whole room. That had not been the case with the Sheridan house, where the fire only damaged part of the room. John's undershirt, which he was wearing when he died, was only charred, not burned. Mark sent Soriano a lengthy email expressing his frustration with this and other apparent failures of the investigation.

The melted object was not the only aspect of the crime scene that the Sheridans believed had not been properly investigated. A month after the fire, an insurance adjuster inspecting the house found a bent fireplace poker in a nearby bathroom, odd since the house has no upstairs fireplace. It had been photographed on the day of the fire but not taken into evidence until after the adjuster had found it, at the family's request. The Sheridan brothers theorized that that could have been the cause of John's broken ribs instead of the falling armoire.

The day after the poker was found, Mark recalled confronting Lee Niles, a county investigator, in the house's front yard. "I asked him if he had concluded the case was a murder-suicide and he said he had reached no such conclusion", he later told The New York Observer. "That was a lie. His people made up their minds on day one."

== Report ==
In late March 2015, Soriano released his office's report on the death of John Sheridan. It found no evidence of an intruder and concluded that he and Joyce were the only ones in the house. Instead of being undetermined, his death was now considered a suicide.

Soriano said detectives had conducted 180 interviews and looked through all the couple's records. It quoted some unnamed witnesses describing John as "'disproportionately concerned,' 'genuinely worried' and 'overly worried'" about the upcoming state report on the cardiac unit's problems. Reportedly John was planning a meeting with some co-workers at the hospital the day he died.

Robbery was ruled out as a motive since nearly a thousand dollars in cash remained on a bedroom nightstand; jewelry, electronic devices, (Note: Joyce's iPad was on the floor near her body.) antiques and prescription drugs that might have been of interest to a thief had also not been taken. The house had not been forcibly entered, (Note: The door from the garage to the residence had been forced open, but that had been done by the firefighters.) nor had neighbors reported any prowlers in the area before or immediately after the fire. DNA from the blood on the knife, Soriano wrote, was consistent with John.

Based on the lack of evidence for other theories, and the five hesitation wounds, Soriano concluded that the deaths had, as investigators originally believed, been a murder-suicide. His report did not speculate on how the Sheridans came to end their lives that way, whether it had been planned (as the presence of the gas can, brought up from the basement to start the fire, and the kitchen knives suggested might have been the case) or the result of a sudden impulse or fight between the couple, or what the motive might have been. A single wound to the jugular vein, in conjunction with smoke inhalation from the fire, was given as the cause of death.

In the one interview he has given about the report, Soriano dismissed the melted object the brothers found. "I don't know what it is. It could have been anything" he told Star-Ledger columnist Tom Moran. "What we tried to do was gather all the relevant evidence", he said when asked about the report's failure to convincingly identify a motive. "I don't know what else was going on in his life."

== Criticism ==
Mark had been in regular contact with Soriano and was able to review the report in its final drafts before it was publicized. He strongly disagreed with its conclusions and expressed that opinion in news coverage. "To be clear, we do not have answers to what happened to our parents," he said in a statement on behalf of himself and his brothers. "Based on the evidence, neither do the investigators." In 2022 he described the investigation as "pathetic ... by 10 a.m. they were out of the house, done, left, concluded what they concluded, and that was it ... I've said to the prosecutor, 'It's bad enough you're calling my father a murderer, but you're also calling him a moron, as though he weren't smart enough to work this out.'"

If his father genuinely wanted to kill himself and his wife, Mark said later, he would have planned it in such a way as to leave no doubt. "We will not allow our father to be convicted based on guesswork resulting from an inadequate and incomplete investigation simply because he is not here to defend himself", he said, suggesting the family would be suing Soriano's office.

The sons were not the only ones dissatisfied with the official findings. "The prosecutor's conclusion destroyed their legacy and the good that John and Joyce had done in their lives", said John's brother Peter, a federal judge. "They couldn't have done a worse job if they intended to mess up that investigation" said Ed Stier, first head of the state's Division of Criminal Justice. "They destroyed the crime scene, made it impossible for anybody to come in later on and do any decent forensic work."

=== Knives ===
In the Sheridans' statement, the apparently missing third knife was a key concern, but not the only one. Why, they asked, were three knives necessary for a murder-suicide, including one that was not an ideal weapon? None of Joyce's blood was on John, nor was there any evidence that her obvious struggles had injured him in any way.

Baden, in an affidavit filed with the brothers' later court action, went further in his criticisms of the prosecutor's conclusions. John had not shown any signs of suicidal ideations or depression before his death, he noted. None of the knives present could have caused any of his thin and deep wounds, not even the purported hesitation wounds, he claimed (nor did he believe the melted metal had been a knife). The angle of John's neck wound, downward and slightly forward, was also consistent with being attacked. And if John had stabbed Joyce, some of her blood should have been on him, but none was.

Baden also had Lee review the results from the DNA on the knives. While Soriano had said the DNA was consistent with John, the lab report had only said that due to the minimal amount available it could only be determined with certainty to have come from a white male. Lee told Baden that they had a genetic pattern that did not match any male member of the Sheridan family; this DNA has since been clarified as having come from the handle of one of the knives.

Dennis Cogan, a former Philadelphia prosecutor turned defense attorney who reviewed Baden's affidavit for the Inquirer, agreed. "The missing knife is so overwhelming that there's a third person who did this," he said. He believed that Soriano and his investigators had attempted to make whatever facts they found fit their original theory rather than following them where they led.

=== Poker ===
The injuries to John's upper body, including the broken ribs, could just as easily have resulted from being struck repeatedly with the poker as from the armoire falling on him, according to Baden. He also had had a chipped front tooth not noted in the initial autopsy report, but without the bruises on the face that would be expected if the armoire had caused it.

Barry Jansen, the police photographer, does not think the poker's presence disproves the murder-suicide theory. "If somebody's going to hit him with a fire poker, they're going to finish the job", he told WNYC. He also questioned why an intruder would have gone downstairs to get both it and the knives. "None of that makes any sense."

Barbara Boyer, a reporter for the Inquirer whom the Sheridans allowed to tour the house after the deaths, believes it entirely plausible that an intruder could have resorted to the poker. Anyone entering the house from the unlocked back door would have been in the immediate vicinity of the fireplace and the tool rack the poker was taken from. "It was almost like they were weapons of opportunity", she said. A set of stairs led up from that part of the house to a second master bedroom door. John had hung his suits on the inside, and the absence of any soot on the surface behind them indicates it was closed during the fire. But a bloodstain on the threshold suggests to Mark that it may have been open at some time prior to it while his parents were being attacked.

=== Witnesses not interviewed ===
Chris Stephens, a longtime friend of Joyce's, did not recall Joyce ever expressing any complaint about her marriage or acting unusually before her death; her husband says police never contacted them for an interview, so, "I knew right away that they didn't do a good investigation." (Note: Both Stephenses reported that they were interviewed by the attorney general's office shortly after it reopened the investigation in 2022.) According to Mark, no one who had interacted with his father on the day before the fire, nor anyone who had worked on the family home, were interviewed. Mary Kay Roberts, who had worked closely with John in the public and private sector for around twenty years, and had last interacted with him almost twenty-four hours before the fire, also said she was never interviewed.

A neighbor who lived on the cul-de-sac at the end of Meadow Run near the Sheridan house also was, she says, never interviewed. She referred WNYC reporter Nancy Solomon to another neighbor on the cul-de-sac, Tom Draper, who had since moved away but saw and reported something he thought might have been of interest to the police a week earlier. That Sunday morning, Draper told Solomon, he had been leaving around 5:45 a.m. for a church meeting. As he backed out of his driveway, he saw, and nearly hit, a vehicle parked in the middle of the cul-de-sac, its rear end to his house. When the driver saw him, the vehicle sped off in the direction of the Sheridans' house, then suddenly turned left down Pheasant Run Drive, into a group of streets that had no outlet, a decision Draper thought strange enough for him to briefly consider following the car.

=== Stairwell bloodstains ===
If I make a mistake, I'll own the mistake and I'll own the mistake that I didn't document that blood staining on the wall. That was something that I should have done, even though I was told not to. If I had to do it over, I would definitely do it.

— Police photographer Barry Jansen,

While Baden did not feel the evidence necessarily pointed to an intruder, he did say some evidence supported that conclusion. Spatters of John's blood on the walls outside the room and the stairwell, which Jansen says he was told not to document, were consistent with an attack, and cast doubt on Soriano's assertion that the stabbing had been confined to the Sheridans' bedroom.

Soriano's report says these were transfer stains, found atop the soot layer left by the fire, and thus attributes them to the firefighters removing the bodies. Baden doubted this explanation, as the apparent spatter was at 4–5 feet (120–150 cm) on the wall above the transfer stains that were present and was unlike them not smeared. A retired Philadelphia homicide detective who accompanied Inquirer reporter Boyer, whom the Sheridans allowed to tour the house, agreed the spatter was consistent with a stabbing.

=== Fingerprints ===
In their response to Soriano's report, the Sheridans also complained that investigators should not have ruled out an intruder without making certain there were no identifiable fingerprints or trace blood evidence at or near any of the house's four unlocked entrances. Boyer had found an apparent bloody fingerprint on the inside of the front door. It also was uncertain whether the poker had even been checked for prints because it was found in a nearby bathroom along with other items from the bedroom that were apparently considered of little investigative use.

The whistleblower lawsuit later filed against the county by Detective Jeffrey Scozzafava, who claimed he was retaliated against for complaining about mishandling of evidence in the Sheridan case and other investigations, also suggested detectives had lied about any search for fingerprints outside the master bedroom. When asked by a county prosecutor if they had dusted the house's doorknobs and windowsills, they said they had used the "flashlight technique" to search other areas for prints and concluded there were none that could be identifiable as belonging to a specific person. No one Solomon spoke with, including a former NYPD detective, had ever heard of this method of finding fingerprints, and Scozzafava alleged it had been made up to avoid having to admit that they had not dusted or searched for prints any other way.

Scozzafava's lawsuit also revealed another piece of possible fingerprint evidence. Two months after the fire, John's driver's license was found on the ground at a college campus an hour's drive north of Skillman. The student who found it mailed it back to the Sheridans' address, unaware of his death. Scozzafava was asked to check it for fingerprints and began the process, but was reassigned to the fugitive unit before he could finish; it is unknown whether that analysis was completed.

=== Other issues ===
In addition to the uncertainties created by the metal object and the poker found later, the brothers believe it was impossible for the crime to have been committed as the prosecutor imagined it had. They had, in private conversations, considered the possibility that their mother, known to be more prone to angry outbursts than her husband, might have initiated something which escalated into what the firefighters found. But, they realized, the 5-foot-2-inch (157 cm) Joyce would have had to raise her hands above her shoulders to inflict her husband's fatal wound, and with her chronic upper-back pain from her injury it would have been unlikely that she could have, or that if she had she would not have been able to strike with sufficient force.

Mark also said that prosecutors dismissed his suggestions that L3 or other land deals in Camden CFP and the hospital were involved in might have motivated someone to kill John as something that only happened in the movies. (Note: John Farmer Jr., a former state attorney general and longtime friend of John Sheridan's, said that at the last time the two socialized, a month before his friend's death, Sheridan had told him that he and Norcross "weren't talking much".) While doing his parents' final year of taxes several months after the fire, Mark found a banker's box full of documents his father had saved, many of which he had not previously been aware despite having been consulted by his father on the ethical issues involved earlier in 2014. It appeared to him that his father was concerned that the developer favored by CFP for L3 had been muscled out of the project by the Norcrosses and forced to sell their rights to the tax credit for a minimal amount to developers aligned with the Norcrosses. He gave copies to both the county prosecutor's office and the state attorney general, but never heard what, if any, action either office took.

Baden believed it was likely that both Sheridans were victims of a homicide, perhaps by someone who intended to kill them both or a burglar caught unawares. "If it's murder-suicide, it's a very unusual murder-suicide", he told The Philadelphia Inquirer in 2016. He added six years later that when suicides involve fire, the suicidal individual usually uses fire on themselves, not to destroy evidence. However, he said the evidence was not strong enough to call the case a homicide, instead advocating for it to be changed to "undetermined".

As a result of his discontent with Soriano's conclusions, Mark Sheridan decided to step down as the chief counsel for the New Jersey Republican Party so he could concentrate on reversing them (although he continued to represent the party and Governor Christie's office in some matters related to the George Washington Bridge scandal, he felt it was a conflict of interest for him to be representing him generally while opposing one of his nominees). He vowed to use the influence he had to block Soriano's reappointment to the prosecutor's office in the coming fall. The family offered $250,000 for any information leading to the identity or arrest of whoever had killed John and Joyce.

=== Problems with state medical examiner system ===
Mark also connected his parents' case to the general problems of New Jersey's medical examiner system. "[It's] a disaster, an embarrassment. MEs should not be under the attorney general or law enforcement. They should not be agents of the state", he told The Star-Ledger. Some of the state's former chief medical examiners agreed with him.

At the time of John and Joyce's deaths, the position of chief medical examiner, in fact, had been vacant for six years (without an acting chief designated). Victor Weedn, the previous chief, had resigned in 2009, telling Governor Jon Corzine that he found the experience "disappointing" and lacking the statutorily required oversight from the Attorney General and the state's Division of Criminal Justice. He noted that all but the first two chief medical examiners appointed since the position had been created late in the 20th century had similarly resigned in frustration. A new chief medical examiner, Andrew Falzon, was appointed by Governor Christie in June 2015.

Problems with the system were worse at lower levels in ways that may have directly affected the Sheridan case. The Northern Regional Medical Examiner's office, under whose auspices Lilavois worked, had failed to achieve reaccreditation by the National Association of Medical Examiners in 2012. Among the failings noted, one of the most serious was that the toxicology lab, which served the entire state, had let its accreditation by the College of American Pathologists lapse in 2009, and was not then listed as certified to conduct testing by the American Board of Forensic Toxicology.

Lilavois himself was not board certified in forensic pathology, although he had been performing autopsies since 1997. He had come to work for New Jersey after resigning from the New York City medical examiner's office following an incident where he had revised a finding of death in the case of a Queens three-year-old from homicide by blunt force to natural death by brain aneurysm. However, despite making the change three weeks after the original autopsy following a review with a colleague, he did not notify either the police or the child's family for almost a year; both learned of the change only when the New York Daily News obtained a copy of the amended death certificate as part of its reporting on the case. In the interim police had continued to investigate the case as a homicide, and the boy's parents had gotten divorced, with the father viewed by everyone as having killed his son.

Because of the vacant state medical examiner position, no one supervised Lilavois' autopsy of John Sheridan. Mark believes that that might be the reason the pathologist's report misstates his father's height, weight and age. In later comments on the case, Weedn says it would not have mattered even if there had been a chief medical examiner, since the state medical examiner has no statutory or regulatory oversight authority over county or regional medical examiners, who are appointed by county governments. "The state medical examiner is merely a figurehead", said Faruk Presswala, Weedn's predecessor, who also resigned over that.

Sheridan also faulted Lilavois's lack of independence from the prosecutor's office. He noted in a letter to John Jay Hoffman, then the state's Acting Attorney General, that Lilavois had met with Soriano three times before the prosecutor issued his final report, and did not issue his pathological finding until just before the report was published. According to Sheridan, the county prosecutor held those meetings to convince Lilavois to rule the case a murder-suicide.

Weedn says New Jersey's medical examiners need to be under the jurisdiction of an independent office not under law enforcement jurisdiction. "People get rewarded for convictions, they get raises and promotions. There is an essential bias," argues Lawrence Kobilinsky, chair of the science department at John Jay College of Criminal Justice and chair of the Northeastern Association of Forensic Scientists. While law enforcement and medical examiners do need to be able to communicate and coordinate their efforts, the latter should be under the jurisdiction of a state's health department to remain independent. "It is essential that these organizations remain independent of each other", Kobilinsky told the Star-Ledger.

== Response ==
There was some backlash from the Sheridans' criticism. Following Mark's comments in news stories criticizing both Soriano and his report, Raymond Bateman, a former State Senate president and the Republican Party's 1977 gubernatorial candidate, wrote an op-ed piece in the Middlesex County Home News Tribune defending Soriano. Bateman's son Christopher, who had followed his father into the State Senate, had sponsored Soriano's nomination.

Bateman took it as an established fact that John, whom he knew from his own days in the State Senate, was mentally ill in some way when he died. He compared him to Andreas Lubitz, a German airline pilot who, shortly before the report's release, had deliberately crashed Germanwings Flight 9525 into the side of a French mountain, killing 149 passengers and crew in addition to himself, and was later found to have been suffering from depression severe enough that he feared losing his commercial pilot's license. "As I write with tears about my friend, John," Bateman wrote, "I recognize that mental depression must just completely overwhelm a person's normal judgment."

Although he had agreed with the Sheridans about the failings of the state medical examiner system, Weedn defended Lilavois' conclusion. Based on reviewing the autopsy reports, he found the couple's injuries "more consistent as a generality with a murder-suicide", although he qualified that by saying he had not seen the photos. Weedn said it was unlikely that a burglar or intruder would have confronted the Sheridans in their bedroom; such struggles usually occur on the ground floor of a house closer to any entrance that might have been used. He agreed that the possibility of homicide could not be ruled out, particularly if the blade used could not be found.

== Court challenge and whistleblower lawsuit ==
In December 2014, Mark and his brothers had sent Baden's affidavit to the state's Attorney General and chief medical examiner, asking that their father's cause of death be recorded as undetermined. They received no reply, and over the next few months let the state know that if John Sheridan was officially ruled to have taken his own life, they would file a lawsuit. After Soriano's report was released, they did.

The state's initial response was to move that the suit be dismissed for lack of standing. "No legal basis exists to compel a medical examiner to change his opinion about manner of death", the Attorney General's office wrote in its response. A three-judge panel ruled that the case should be filed against the medical examiner's office.

While that suit was pending, two other developments occurred in early 2016 that supported the Sheridans' cause. In February a group of 200 prominent state residents, including three former governors, two former attorneys general, a former justice of the state Supreme Court and many lawyers, signed an open letter asking the medical examiner to change the finding. Three months later, a Somerset County detective filed a whistleblower lawsuit claiming that "It was common knowledge among detectives assigned to the Forensic Unit that the Sheridan evidence was improperly collected, improperly preserved and subsequently destroyed" and that he had been retaliated against for complaining about this.

Specifically, Detective Jeffrey Scozzafava's suit alleged that:

- The officers running the prosecutor's Forensics Unit had little or no experience in that area of police work;
- Large pieces of charred bedding from the Sheridans' bedroom were left lying on the floor of the truck that had brought them to the lab for months, (Note: Lee Niles, Scozzafava's supervisor, responded that the bedding was stored there because it was secure and the bedding needed to dry out so it could be kept for any test burns required in investigating the arson.) then stored in an open bag in the fingerprint lab;
- Lee Niles, his supervisor, frequently handled evidence ungloved at crime scenes;
- Blood collection swabs were not packaged properly after being taken;
- Evidence envelopes were not properly taped shut, and ...
- Niles told the prosecutors that the officers had searched for fingerprints using a non-existent "flashlight technique", which Scozzafava characterized as an excuse for not having done it at all.

When he pointed these failures out, the detective said, he was reassigned to a unit dealing with fugitives, a less prestigious position. He later claimed to have seen Niles throwing the improperly collected and stored evidence in the garbage during 2015.

In January 2017, the Sheridans prevailed. State medical examiner Andrew Falzon, after reviewing the evidence, changed the manner of John Sheridan's death from suicide to undetermined. While Falzon still said he believed the wounds were self-inflicted, "no weapon was recovered from the scene that could be conclusively associated with the wounds sustained by Mr. Sheridan." The damage to the scene caused by the fire further compounded the difficulty of reconstructing events that night. Mark Sheridan said that while the family felt vindicated by the change, "we have a long way yet to go".

They called for the case to be reopened and reinvestigated. Five years later, in the wake of Sean Caddle's guilty plea, Mark Sheridan complained that the change in cause of death had made it harder for the family to get information from the prosecutor's office, since they could now say the case was under investigation. "[T]hey say it's an open case, yet they're not doing anything", he said. "We're kind of stuck in limbo."

At the same time, Scozzafava's suit was dismissed after oral argument. The county had argued that his claim was really motivated by "being assigned a Chevrolet rather than a Dodge" and that since he still worked full-time in the prosecutor's office he had not been harmed. Scozzafava's lawyer said his client planned to appeal. Instead, he settled for $175,000 and signed a nondisclosure agreement that prevented him from talking about any of the cases he alleged misconduct in.

== Other subsequent events ==
While the brothers' suit was pending, in February 2016, Christie, himself a former federal prosecutor, decided not to reappoint Soriano to a second term, saying later he had "lost confidence" in him. News stories about the move cited not only the Sheridan case, but other recent cases in which Soriano's office had come in for criticism. He was replaced by Michael Robertson, also a former federal prosecutor, who had served under Christie when the governor was United States Attorney for the District of New Jersey.

"It's long overdue that someone took charge of that office," Mark Sheridan said, upon being informed by a reporter. "I think there has been a long history of failures [there]." However, state senator Christopher Bateman, who had recommended Soriano to Christie at the beginning of the governor's terms, was disappointed. Although the governor had denied to him the Sheridan case had anything to do with his decision to replace Soriano, " the timing is just too coincidental", coming so soon after the open letter. "He did the best he could with the Sheridan investigation. If it came down to that, it's wrong." (Note: Later, Bateman also speculated that Christie was angry at him for joining the Senate's Democratic majority in voting to override the governor's veto of a bill that would grant police a say in whether mentally ill individuals can receive firearms permits, a process that had previously been purely judicial. It was the first time the legislature had overridden a veto of Christie's in six years as governor. Christie denied that either that or the Sheridan case played any role in his decision not to renew Soriano's appointment.) By that fall, Soriano had been hired as one of the state's assistant attorneys general.

Two months later, Matt Sheridan was indicted by a Middlesex County grand jury on the cocaine possession charge that had led to his arrest on the morning of his parents' deaths a year and a half earlier. Despite having expressed discontent with his twin brother for this having happened, Mark accused the prosecutor's office of having sought the charge only as retaliation for the family's efforts to change John's death certificate. He claimed that this violated a promise that had been made by Soriano shortly after the deaths. Due to the conflicts between the family and the prosecutor's office, the case was handled by the Middlesex County prosecutor's office, although any trial would take place in Somerset County. Ultimately the charges were dropped after the search was held to have been illegal.

== Possible connection to Michael Galdieri murder ==
In early 2022 political consultant Sean Caddle pleaded guilty to murder in a Hudson County court. He had not committed the crime himself, but paid two men to kill Michael Galdieri, son of late state senator James Anthony Galdieri, in his Jersey City apartment in May 2014. After stabbing Galdieri, the killers set a fire to conceal the evidence.

Mark Sheridan was struck by the similarities with his parents' deaths—they too had been stabbed and a fire set at the crime scene. In a letter sent to both the Somerset County prosecutor's office and the state's acting attorney general, Matt Platkin, he called the two cases "eerily similar". He reminded them how investigators in both offices had "openly mocked the idea of a killing for hire involving a stabbing with a fire set to destroy evidence".

More than the criminals' modus operandi might connect the two cases, Mark argued. The issue of the possibly missing knife might be involved. He recalled in the letter how investigators had several times asked him and his brothers about a knife missing from the block in their parents' kitchen. It might, he suggested, have been found.

The day after his parents' deaths, Mark wrote, police investigating a bank robbery in Trumbull, Connecticut, had found a "long-bladed butcher knife" in a pickup truck belonging to one of the suspects, George Bratsenis. Mark urged investigators to work with Connecticut authorities to find the knife and test it for any DNA evidence that might link it to his parents' deaths.

Bratsenis was later identified by both Caddle and Bomani Africa, a former cellmate of Bratsenis, who has also pleaded guilty to murdering Galdieri, as the other hired killer in that crime. A career criminal with connections to organized crime who once was part of a ring that had set fires to cover its burglaries of jewelry stores, Bratsenis pleaded guilty to Galdieri's murder himself in March 2022. At that hearing it was revealed that he had agreed to the plea the preceding August.

The FBI has taken over the Galdieri case for reasons it has not disclosed. At Caddle's plea hearing, his lawyer, Edwin Jacobs, who has defended many clients in high-profile cases, including some organized-crime figures, told the court that his client had been cooperating with the government. He declined to be specific, saying, "I will simply leave it at this: As recently as today, he has been working, collaborating, with the FBI in developing an important investigation." Caddle could face a life sentence, but according to the plea agreement federal prosecutors were prepared to recommend a sentence from 12 1/2 to 25 years if he satisfies its terms.

His sentencing has been rescheduled from June to December. Political insiders in the state believe the case has the potential to become New Jersey's next major public corruption scandal. "A lot of people are watching it with bated breath," Richard Codey, a Democratic state senator and the state's longest-serving legislator, as well as having twice served as acting governor, told The New York Times.

Neither office responded to Mark's letters, but at the end of May Platkin's office announced it was reopening the investigation. The brothers had sections of the bloodstained drywall preserved as evidence before they sold the house. Beyond that, Mark was skeptical that any new evidence could be found, but was grateful for the possibility. Lawyers for Bratsensis and Caddle would not say whether their clients had been contacted. "We will follow the evidence wherever it leads", Platkin said.

== See also ==
- Deaths in September 2014
- List of unsolved deaths
- List of unsolved murders (2000–present)
