= James Galdieri =

James Galdieri may refer to:

- James Anthony Galdieri (1934–2009), American politician from Jersey City
- James J. Galdieri (1900–1944), American politician from Jersey City
