= Galdieri =

Galdieri is a surname. Notable people with the surname include:

- James Anthony Galdieri (1934–2009), American politician, son of James J.
- James J. Galdieri (1896–1944), American politician
- Michele Galdieri (1902–1965), Italian screenwriter, songwriter, and lyricist
