= John Sheridan (New Jersey government official) =

American lawyer (1942-2014)

John P. Sheridan Jr.
- John Sheridan in his later years

Commissioner of New Jersey Department of Transportation
- In office May 19, 1982 – May 4, 1985
- Governor: Thomas Kean
- Preceded by: Anne Canby
- Succeeded by: Roger A. Bodman

Personal details
- Born: September 7, 1942 Cambridge, Massachusetts, U.S.
- Died: September 28, 2014 (aged 72) Skillman, New Jersey, U.S.
- Cause of death: Stabbing of undetermined cause; smoke inhalation
- Party: Republican
- Spouse: Joyce Mitchko
- Children: 4
- Education: St. Peter's University
- Occupation: Lawyer, public official, healthcare executive
- Known for: Presiding over creation of NJ Transit Rail Operations; controversial death

John Patrick Sheridan Jr. (September 7, 1942 – September 28, 2014) was a lawyer from the U.S. state of New Jersey. During the 1970s and 1980s he served in state government under Republican governors William T. Cahill and Thomas Kean. As the state's Transportation Commissioner during the latter governor's administration, he oversaw the transfer of commuter rail service in the state from Conrail to New Jersey Transit. At the time of his death, he was president and chief executive officer of Cooper Health System, which has since named one of its buildings after him.

His death has been a matter of some controversy. Firefighters responding to a fire at his Skillman home in the early morning found Sheridan and his wife Joyce dead in an upstairs room. Both bodies had been stabbed multiple times; an autopsy found John Sheridan had been alive after the fire started. After a lengthy investigation the Somerset County prosecutor ruled that John Sheridan had killed his wife and then himself, setting the fire to make it appear they had died that way.

Sheridan's four sons, the oldest of whom had followed his father's political footsteps and served as chief counsel to the New Jersey Republican Party, vigorously disputed the finding. After a court challenge they brought, in 2017 the state's chief medical examiner overruled the prosecutor and said that while John Sheridan's proximate cause of death was the combined effect of the stab wounds he suffered and smoke inhalation, it could not be determined if he had stabbed himself or not. In 2022 the state reopened the investigation in the wake of a similar killing that also involved some people with political connections.

== Early life ==
John Patrick Sheridan Jr. was born September 7, 1942, in Cambridge, Massachusetts, to Rita and John P. Sheridan. The family moved to Northern New Jersey in childhood, and John Jr. eventually graduated from Seton Hall Preparatory School, then in South Orange. He graduated from St. Peter's College (now St. Peter's University) in Jersey City in 1964 and Rutgers Law School in 1967.

He met Joyce Mitchko, of Lincoln Park, New Jersey, three years his junior, while he was tending bar in West Orange to pay for a law school. The two married in 1967. Over the next decade they would have four children, all sons: twins Mark and Matthew, Daniel and Timothy. Joyce taught social studies in the Cedar Grove and South Brunswick school districts.

His younger brother, Peter G. Sheridan, went to St. Peter's as well, and is currently a federal judge on senior status with the United States District Court for the District of New Jersey.

== Career ==
After law school he served in the Army for two years from 1968 to 1970. Returning to civilian life, he went to work in the administration of Republican New Jersey Governor William T. Cahill as a deputy attorney general and, later, assistant counsel to Cahill. Later in the decade, after Cahill's two terms had ended and Democrat Brendan Byrne was elected governor, he would serve as counsel to the Republicans, then the minority party, in the State Senate. Outside of government, he ran the Trenton office of the Morristown law firm Riker, Danzig, Scherer, Hyland & Perretti, lobbying state government on behalf of the firm's clients.

Sheridan had also served as counsel to the New Jersey Turnpike Authority. This experience led to his appointment as the state's Transportation Commissioner when Republicans returned to control of the state's executive branch with the 1981 election of Thomas Kean as governor. James Weinstein, who worked for Sheridan in that position and later became Transportation Commissioner himself, recalls that Sheridan got his department's goal accomplished through "patient, lawyerly arguments based on public policy and shared interests."

In 1982, Congress had mandated that Conrail, the government-created corporation that took over the freight operations of many bankrupt private railways in the Northeast and Midwest, stop providing passenger service, which it had not done well in any event. The commuter rail lines that Conrail had operated in New Jersey, mostly in the New York City metropolitan area but one crossing South Jersey from Atlantic City to Philadelphia, were thus transferred to New Jersey Transit, created three years earlier to take over bus services around the state that private companies could no longer provide. Sheridan completed this takeover by the end of Kean's first term in 1985; he served on NJ Transit's board for several years afterwards.

After leaving that position he returned to private law practice. He was not done with politics; in 1993, when Republicans retook the governor's mansion and state legislature, he served on Christine Todd Whitman's transition team. For 25 years he served on the Carrier Clinic's board.

In 2005 he left Riker Danzig, where he had become a senior partner and the firm's co-manager, to take over as president and chief executive officer of Cooper University Hospital in Camden. He and the chairman of the hospital's board, George Norcross, a leading Democratic figure in South Jersey, worked together to use their political connections and knowledge to secure favorable rulings from regulators and public financing in support of Cooper's expansion plans. Several years later, this led to the merger with the MD Anderson Cancer Center and the opening of the only four-year medical school in South Jersey, Cooper Medical School of Rowan University.

Sheridan did not leave politics completely during his time at Cooper. Shortly after taking the job, he helped his brother Peter G. Sheridan get nominated, and then confirmed, to a judgeship on New Jersey's federal district court. After the 2009 election of another Republican, Chris Christie, to the governorship, he served again on the transition team.

== Death ==
Shortly before dawn on September 28, 2014, local firefighters responded to a report of flames at the Sheridans' house on Meadow Run Drive in the Skillman section of Montgomery Township, in southwestern Somerset County. Smoke was coming from one area of the second floor that turned out to be the master bedroom. After entering through the unlocked front door, the firefighters went upstairs and easily put out the fire, fueled by gasoline that had been poured on the floor as an accelerant. Also on the floor, they found the bodies of John and Joyce, lying face up. John was pronounced dead at the scene, as was Joyce after her body was taken to University Medical Center of Princeton at Plainsboro.

A week later, a memorial service was held for John and Joyce at Patriot's Theater at the Trenton War Memorial. The family was joined by hundreds of mourners, including Christie and his predecessors Kean, Whitman and Democrat Jim Florio. Many of the public officials present praised John Sheridan's career and accomplishments. "The city of Camden is a different place because of his vision," George Norcross said. The actual funeral was private.

In March 2015, Geoffrey Soriano, the county prosecutor, ruled that their death was a murder-suicide in which John, possibly motivated by despair over an upcoming negative state report on the hospital's cardiac unit, had killed Joyce, then himself, and set the fire to conceal evidence. Mark Sheridan and his brothers strongly disputed that conclusion, and hired Michael Baden to do a second autopsy. He concluded that it was highly likely that a third person killed the two, especially given that the knife which had inflicted the fatal wounds could not be found.

While they did not dispute that their father had died of the stab wounds and smoke inhalation, the Sheridan brothers campaigned vigorously to have John Sheridan's manner of death changed to "undetermined" from suicide, based on Baden's recommendation, and for Soriano to not be reappointed county prosecutor when his term expired. (Note: In New Jersey, unlike most other states, the chief lawyer responsible for prosecuting criminal offenses at the county level is appointed by the governor and confirmed by the State Senate, to serve a five-year term, rather than being elected by the voters of the county.) Newspaper reporting about the case revealed extensive problems with the state's medical examiner system in general and how it handled the Sheridans' case in particular. A detective who had investigated the case early on claimed in a suit, later dismissed, against the prosecutor's office that he had been retaliated against after complaining that other detectives mishandled and even threw away key evidence in the case.

After Governor Christie appointed a new state medical examiner, Andrew Falzon, in 2016, 200 politically prominent New Jerseyans, including three former governors and two former attorneys general, wrote the new medical examiner an open letter asking that John Sheridan's death certificate be amended as his family wanted. Later in 2016 Christie refused to renew Soriano's appointment, reportedly claiming he had "lost confidence" in the prosecutor. In 2017 Falzon officially changed John Sheridan's death certificate to say that the manner of death was undetermined.

Five years later, after Sean Caddle, a Democratic political consultant in the state, pleaded guilty in federal court to orchestrating the murder for hire of Michael Galdieri, son and grandson of state senators, Mark Sheridan wrote to Somerset County's prosecutor and the state's acting attorney general Matt Platkin noting the similarities to his parents' deaths. Caddle's hired killers had stabbed Galdieri repeatedly and attempted to cover their crime by starting a fire; a knife, possibly one missing from the Sheridans' home, had been found in the truck of a man who later pleaded guilty in the Galdieri murder the day after their bodies were found. Mark asked the authorities to reopen the case and examine the knife if they could; Platkin agreed to do so in May.

== Legacy ==
In May 2017 Cooper named one of its facilities after its late head. Sheridan Pavilion is a 160,000-square-foot (15,000 m^{2}) five-story ambulatory care facility on the hospital's campus in downtown Camden that treats 100,000 patients a year. Governor Christie, former governors Kean, Florio, Corzine and James McGreevey, along with former acting governor and state senate president Donald DiFrancesco, attended the dedication ceremony.

== See also ==
- List of American politicians of Irish descent
- Politics of New Jersey
