= Odyssey House =

Drug abuse treatment organization

- Type: Non-profit
- Genre: Behavioral health, adolescent drug and alcohol addiction, mental illness and intervention
- Founded: East Harlem, U.S. (1966)
- Headquarters: United States
- Website: www.odysseyhouseinc.org

Odyssey House is the name of private not-for-profit organization established in 1967 in East Harlem to provide treatment and education for drug and alcohol addiction and victims of child abuse. While additional centres have since opened in the US, Australia and New Zealand, each centre has operated as an independent organisation since the 1980s.

== History ==
The first Odyssey House, in East Harlem, was established by Dr. Judianne Densen-Gerber, a resident psychiatrist working at Metropolitan Hospital in New York City who, dissatisfied with the practice of using drug replacement medications such as methadone as the primary therapeutic intervention, started a "drug free" programme in 1966.

In 1979, New York magazine published a detailed article by investigative journalist Lucy Komisar alleging serious abuse and financial misconduct at Odyssey House, including that Densen-Gerber used residents as personal servants. In 1983, Densen-Gerber resigned her position as executive director after a state investigation found financial irregularities. She paid back $20,000 in excessive personal expenses in order to close a state investigation into the organization.

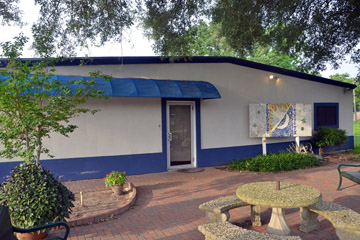
An Odyssey House facility in Texas, Houston, pictured in 2012.

Odyssey House centres have also been established in Utah, Louisiana, Michigan and Texas. Centres also launched in the Australian states of New South Wales and Victoria in 1977 and 1979 respectively, and in the New Zealand cities of Auckland and Christchurch in 1980 and 1985. Despite sharing a common name, all treatment centres have operated as independent entities since the 1980s.
