= Judianne Densen-Gerber =

American psychiatrist and lawyer

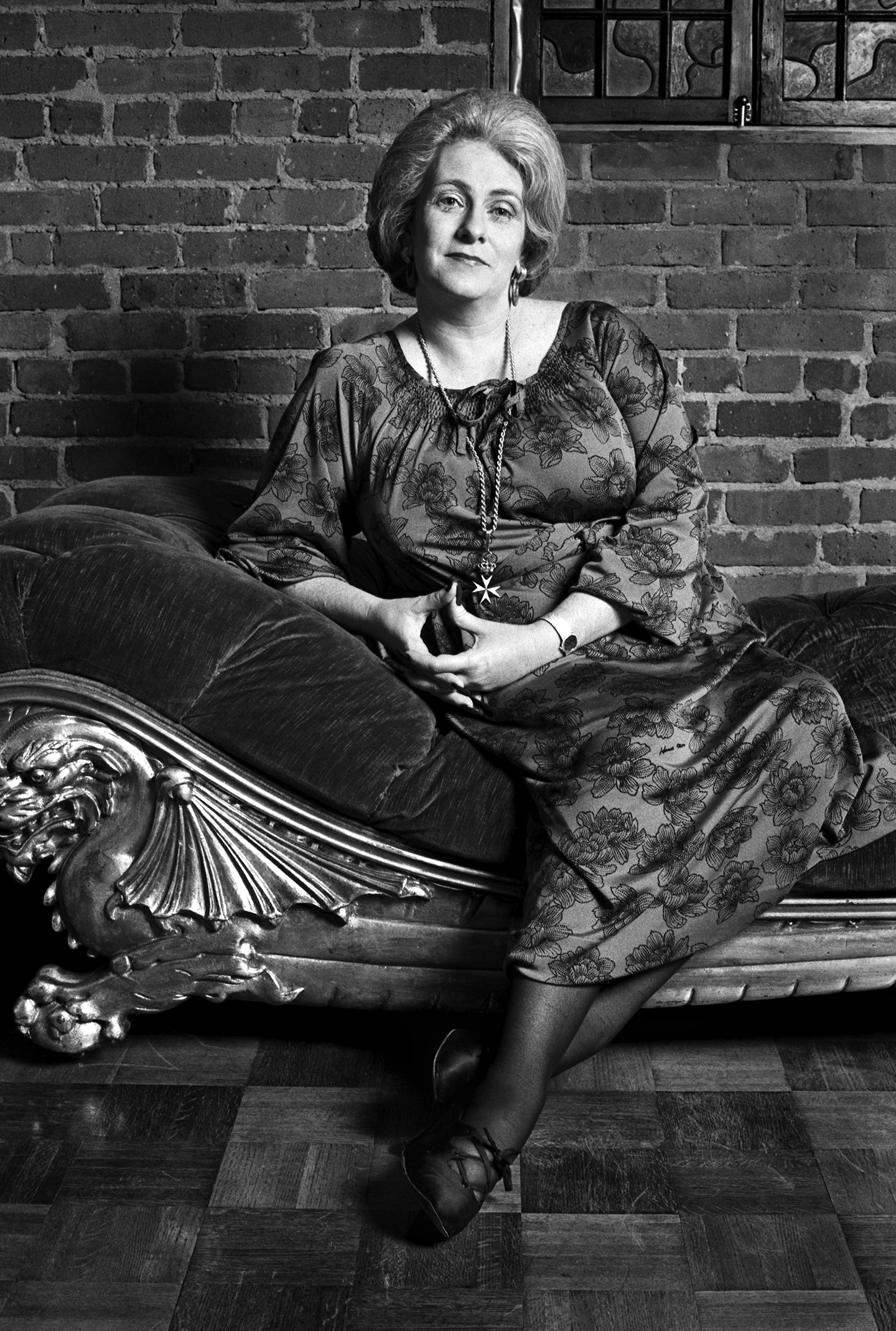
- Judianne Densen-Gerber photographed in 1976 by Lynn Gilbert
- Born: November 13, 1934; New York City, U.S.
- Died: May 11, 2003 (aged 68); New York City, U.S.
- Education: Bryn Mawr College; Columbia Law School (JD); New York University Grossman School of Medicine (MD)
- Occupations: Psychiatrist; lawyer; educator
- Spouse: Michael Baden
- Parent(s): Gustave Gerber; Beatrice Densen

Judianne Densen-Gerber (November 13, 1934 – May 11, 2003) was an American psychiatrist, lawyer, and educator. She worked in the field of substance abuse rehabilitation, and campaigned against child abuse, domestic violence and pornography.

Densen-Gerber founded Odyssey House, an organisation for drug and alcohol rehabilitation. She was accused of abuse and financial impropriety within the organization in 1979, and resigned in 1983 after agreeing to pay back $20,000 in excessive personal expenses.

== Early life ==
She was born to Gustave Gerber, a chemical engineer and Beatrice Densen, an heiress. She graduated from Bryn Mawr College in 1956, Columbia Law School (JD 1959), and New York University (MD 1963). Until 1997, she was married to pathologist Michael Baden. She died in her sleep from cancer. At the time of her death, she was a resident of Westport, Connecticut.

== Career ==
She founded Odyssey House while working as a resident psychiatrist at Metropolitan Hospital. In 1979, New York magazine published a detailed article by investigative journalist Lucy Komisar alleging serious abuse and financial misconduct at Odyssey House, including that Densen-Gerber used residents as personal servants. Former staff and residents also reported "cult-like" behavior, including that residents were asked to pledge loyalty to Densen-Gerber and light candles in her honor.

In 1983 she resigned her position as executive director after a state investigation found financial irregularities. Densen-Gerber paid back $20,000 in excessive personal expenses in order to close the investigation.

== Publications ==
- Odyssey House: A Structural Model for the Successful Employment and Re-Entry of the Ex-Drug Abuser Volume: 4 issue: 4, page(s): 414–427, Issue published: October 1, 1974, Judianne Densen-Gerber, J. D., M. D., David Drassner, M.S., Ed.M. https://doi.org/10.1177/002204267400400413
- Drugs, sex, parents, and you
