= Environmental issues in Camden, New Jersey =

Camden, New Jersey has faced environmental issues due to its history of heavy industry and the improper disposal of contaminants. Environmental concerns include air/water pollution and soil contamination, as well as Superfund sites throughout the city. In recent years, illegal dumping has become an issue due to all the vacant lots throughout the city and lack of security and maintenance coming from City Hall.

== Air and water pollution ==
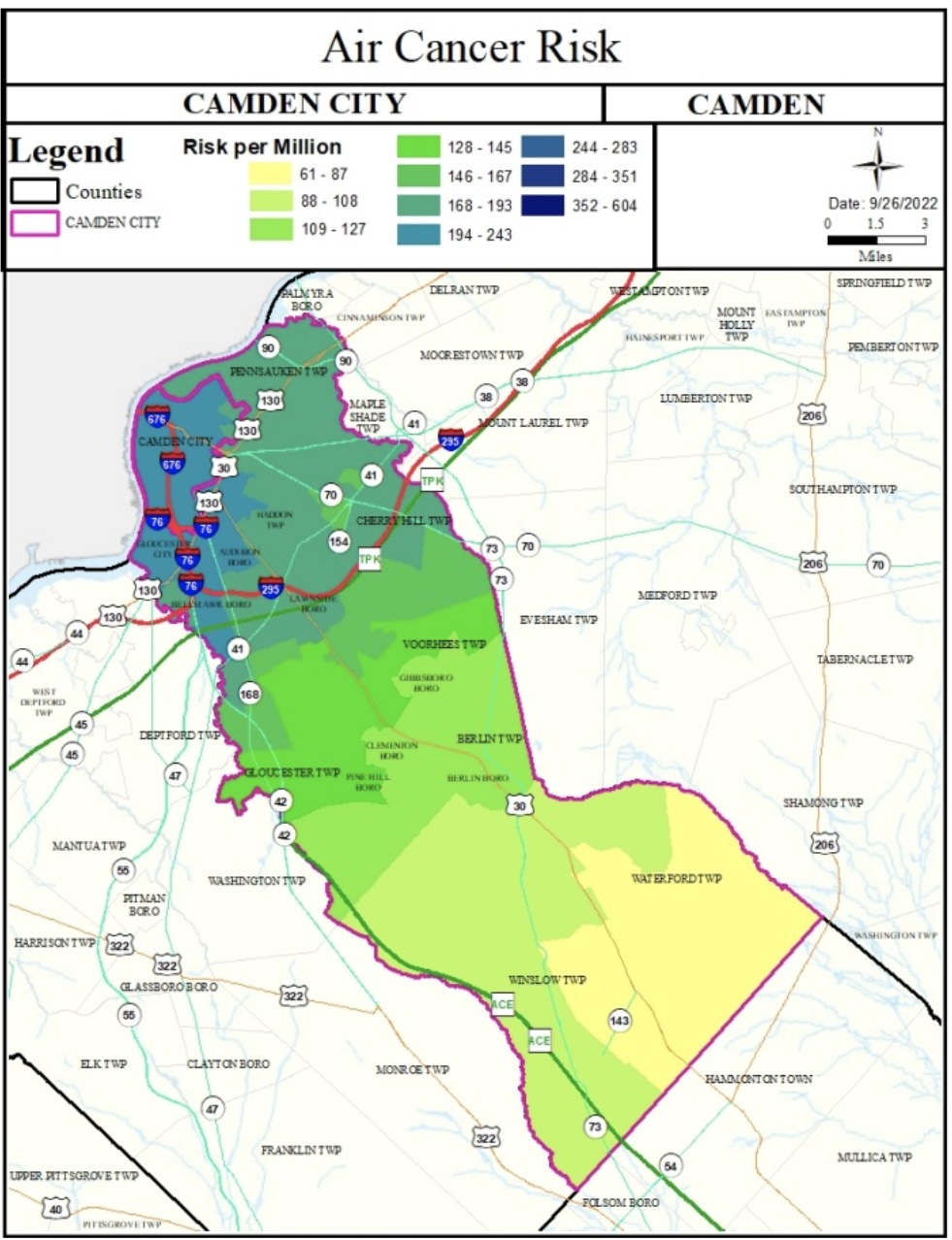
Air pollutant cancer-risk assessment model in Camden city.

Situated on the Delaware River waterfront, the city of Camden contains many pollution-causing facilities, such as a trash incinerator and a sewage plant. Despite the additions of new waste-water and trash treatment facilities in the 1970s and 1980s, pollution in the city remains a problem due to faulty waste disposal practices and outdated sewer systems. The open-air nature of the waste treatment plants cause the smell of sewage and other toxic fumes to permeate through the air. This has encouraged local grassroots organizations to protest the development of these plants in Camden. The development of traffic-heavy highway systems between Philadelphia and South Jersey also contributed to the rise of air pollution in the area. Water contamination has been a problem in Camden for decades. In the 1970s, dangerous pollutants were found near the Delaware River at the Puchack Well Field, where many Camden citizens received their household water from, decreasing property values in Camden and causing health problems among the city's residents. Materials contaminating the water included cancer-causing metals and chemicals, affecting as many as 50,000 people between the early 1970s and late 1990s, when the six Puchack wells were officially shut down and declared a Superfund site. Camden also contains 22 of New Jersey's 217 combined sewer overflow outfalls, or CSOs, down from 28 in 2013.

Beginning in the fall of 2002, The Waterfront South Air Toxics Pilot Project was initiated when a DEP Workgroup made plans to study the Air Toxics of Camden City, specifically the Waterfront South neighborhood. The study was funded by a Community assessment, and a grant was provided from the USEPA to the DEP. The driving goal of the project was to develop tools that can quickly and accurately assess air quality. The project focused not only on air quality assessment, but also tools that can measure specific air toxics such as lead, arsenic, and cadmium which can come from various industrial manufacturing processes in the area. The subsequent studies focused on the Waterfront South neighborhood in Camden due to resident concerns about air quality. The area, covering less than one square mile, houses various sources of pollution, including the Camden County Sewage Treatment plant, the County Municipal Waste Combustor, a licorice processing plant, and a cement manufacturing facility. The Department of Environmental Protection (DEP) collaborated with a Community Advisory Committee comprising residents and professionals from the neighborhood. The Committee aided in identifying all significant air emission sources for the study and helped develop risk reduction strategies to address identified pollutants based on their risk assessment findings.

== CCMUA ==
The Camden City Municipal Utilities Authority, or CCMUA, was established in the early 1970s to treat sewage waste in Camden County, by City Democratic chairman and director of public works Angelo Errichetti, who became the authority's executive director. Errichetti called for a primarily state or federally funded sewage plant, which would have cost $14 million, and a region-wide collection of trash-waste. The sewage plant was a necessity to meet the requirements of the Federal Clean Water Act, as per the changes implemented to the act in 1972. James Joyce, chair of the county's Democratic Party at the time, had his own ambitions in regard to establishing a sewage authority that clashed with Errichetti's. While Errichetti formed his sewage authority through his own power, Joyce required the influence of the Camden County Board of Chosen Freeholders to form his. Errichetti and Joyce competed against each other to gain the cooperation of Camden's suburban communities, with Errichetti ultimately succeeding. Errichetti's political alliance with the county freeholders of Cherry Hill gave him an advantage and Joyce was forced to disband his County Sewerage Authority.

Errichetti later replaced Joyce as county Democratic chairman, after the latter resigned due to bribery charges, and retained control of the CCMUA even after leaving his position as executive director in 1973 to run for mayor of Camden. The CCMUA originally planned for the sewage facilities in Camden to treat waste water through a primary and secondary process before having it deposited into the Delaware River; however, funding stagnated and byproducts from the plant began to accumulate, causing adverse environmental effects in Camden. Concerned about the harmful chemicals that were being emitted from the waste build-up, the CCMUA requested permission to dump five million gallons of waste into the Atlantic Ocean. Their request was denied and the CCMUA began searching for alternative ways to dispose of the sludge, which eventually led to the construction of an incinerator, as it was more cost effective than previously proposed methods. In 1975, the CCMUA purchased Camden's two sewage treatment plants for $11.3 million, the first payment consisting of $2.5 million and the final payment to be made by the end of 1978.

== Contamination in Waterfront South ==
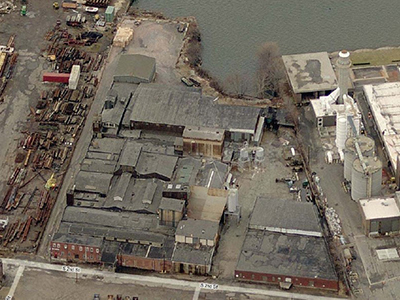
Aerial photo of the Phoenix Park site pre-renovation.

Camden's Waterfront South neighborhood, located in the southern part of the city between the Delaware River and Interstate 676, is home to two dangerously contaminated areas, Welsbach/General Gas Mantle and Martin Aaron, Inc., the former of which has been emanating low levels of gamma radiation since the early 20th century. Several industrial pollution sites, including the Camden County Sewage Plant, the County Municipal Waste Combustor, the world's largest licorice processing plant, chemical companies, auto shops, and a cement manufacturing facility, are present in the Waterfront South neighborhood, which covers less than one square mile. The neighborhood contains 20% of Camden's contaminated areas and over twice the average number of pollution-emitting facilities per New Jersey ZIP Code.

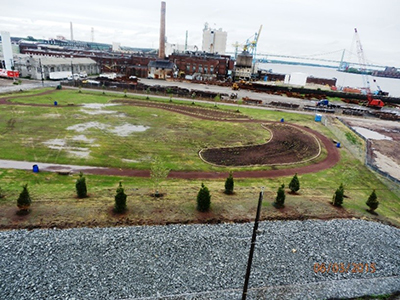
Phoenix Park under renovation.

According to the Rutgers University Journal of Law and Urban Policy, African-American residents of Waterfront South have a greater chance of developing cancer than anywhere in the state of Pennsylvania, 90% higher for females and 70% higher for males. 61% of Waterfront South residents have reported respiratory difficulties, with 48% of residents experiencing chronic chest tightness. Residents of Waterfront South formed the South Camden Citizens in Action, or SCCA, in 1997 to combat the environmental and health problems imposed from the rising amount of pollution and the trash-to-steam facilities being implemented by the CCMUA. One such facility, the Covanta Camden Energy Recovery Center (formerly the Camden Resource Recovery Facility), is located on Morgan Street in the Waterfront South neighborhood and burns 350,000 tons of waste from every town in Camden County, aside from Gloucester Township. The waste is then converted into electricity and sold to utility companies that power thousands of homes.

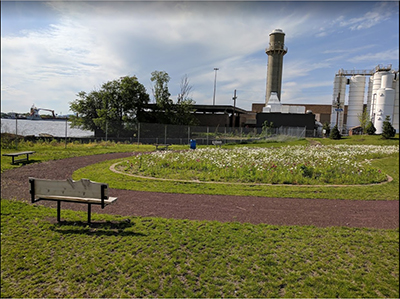
Phoenix Park post-renovation after 2015 grand opening.

On December 12, 2018, renovation of Phoenix Park in Waterfront South was completed. The renovation was done by the Camden County Municipal Utilities Authority as well as the Camden Stormwater Management and Resource Training Initiative. According to officials, the park will improve air quality and stormwater management. Additionally, the park features walking trails providing a view of the Delaware River. Due to the project's success, it was named one of the 10 most innovative uses of federal water infrastructure funding in the country by the U.S. Environmental Protection Agency and the Environmental Council of the United States.

Former Harrison Avenue Landfill

Within the waterfront Cramer Hill neighborhood of Camden City at the intersection of Cooper River and the Delaware River, a landfill site operated from the years 1952 to 1971. This landfill spanned 86 acres; debris and garbage consistently drifted into the riverbank while in operation, thus contaminating the waterfront and wildlife of the Delaware River. The landfill was never officially closed, which made it a location ripe for illegal dumping and unauthorized disposal of trash and toxins. In 2006, the Salvation Army allocated $59 million from the Ray and Joan Kroc estate to clean up and later construct a Salvation Army Kroc Center on 24 acres of this land which, as of the opening in 2014, serves as a community center for residents of Camden City. After 2014, an additional $74 million was granted towards the remediation of the former landfill: $22 million came from the HDSRF, $4 million in public funds, and the remaining $48 million was granted in settlement of natural resource damage from contributing polluters.

Utilizing these funds, the NJDEP Office of Natural Resource Restoration (ONRR) embarked on a collaborative project to transform the former landfill into Cramer Hill Waterfront Park which was officially opened for public use in November 2021. The park spans 62 acres in which existing freshwater wetlands were restored and protected and several amenities were provided to the park. The NJDEP ONRR states, “Other features one may enjoy within the park include a grassed amphitheater, an entry plaza, exercise stations, a fishing plaza extending into the pond, 3 miles of hiking/biking paths and trails, historic and educational signage, a picnic area, a playground, the sensory garden, multiple shoreline observation areas, and a summit vista with panoramic views of downtown Camden, the Camden Waterfront, the Delaware River, Petty’s Island, the Benjamin Franklin Bridge, and the Philadelphia skyline.”

== Superfund sites ==
Identified by the EPA in 1980, the Welsbach/General Gas Mantle site contained soil and building materials contaminated with radioactive materials. Radiation became prominent when the companies used thorium, a radioactive element withdrawn from monazite ore, in the production of their gas mantles. In the late 19th century and early 20th century, Welsbach Company was located in Gloucester City, which borders Camden, and was a major producer of gas mantles until gas lights were replaced by electric lights. The fabric of the Welsbach gas mantle was put into a solution that consisted of 99% thorium nitrate and 1% cerium nitrate in distilled water, causing it to emit a white light. Operating from 1915 to 1940 in Camden, General Gas Mantle, or GGM, was a manufacturer of gas mantles and served as a competitor for Welsbach. Unlike Welsbach, General Gas Mantle used only a refined, commercial thorium solution to produce its gas mantles. Welsbach and General Gas Mantle went out of business in the 1940s and had no successors.

In 1981, the EPA began investigating the area where the companies once operated for radioactive materials. Five areas were identified as having abnormally high levels of gamma radiation, including the locations of both companies and three primarily residential areas. In 1993, a sixth area was identified. Radioactive materials were identified at 100 properties located near the companies' former facilities in Camden and Gloucester City, as well as the company locations themselves. In 1996, due to the levels of contamination in the areas, the Welsbach and General Gas Mantle site was added to the National Priorities List, which consists of areas in the United States that are or could become contaminated with dangerous substances. The EPA demolished the General Gas Mantle building in late 2000 and only one building remains at the former Welsbach site. Since it was declared a Superfund site, the EPA has removed over 350,000 tons of contaminated materials from the Welsbach/General Gas Mantle site.

In August 2021, the EPA proposed an interim clean-up plan as a temporary measure to combat the prolonged contamination of the former gas mantle site. The proposal states that the EPA will rely mainly on radioactive decay and simultaneously continue to remove contaminated soil that is at the source of groundwater contamination. In order to track the effectiveness of natural radioactive decay, samples from surrounding water sources will be collected and tracked. The plan will be reevaluated by the EPA after sufficient data has been received.

The Martin Aaron, Inc. site operated as a steel drum recycling facility for thirty years, from 1968 to 1998, though industrial companies have made use of the site since the late 19th century, contaminating soil and groundwater in the surrounding area. The drums at the facility, containing residue of hazardous chemicals, were not correctly handled or disposed of, releasing substances such as arsenic and polychlorinated biphenyl into the groundwater and soil. Waste such as abandoned equipment and empty steel drums was removed from the site by the EPA and NJDEP, the latter of which initially tested the site for contamination in 1987. Like the Welsbach/General Gas Mantle site, the Martin Aaron, Inc. site was placed on the National Priorities list in 1999.

In 2005, remedial action concerning the Martin Aaron, Inc. site was decided upon by the EPA. The remedy consisted of removing contaminated soil and transporting it to a disposal facility off-site. The responsible parties capped the remaining contaminated soil and placed restrictions on use of the site until clean-up began in 2016. In 2018, disposal of the soil was completed and the site was capped in 2019.

Illegal dumping

Since approximately early 2019, a massive dirt heap in the Bergen Square neighborhood has grown to be multiple stories high. The pile is found to be contaminated with lead, mercury, and other toxins, thereby contributing to groundwater contamination and air pollution. The current property owners, Weyhill Realty Holdings, as well as the previous owners, S. Yaffa and Sons, Inc., were taken to court by the state in 2021. Community members and local government raised growing concerns over the status of this illegal dumping ground on the corner of 7th and Chestnut streets as the debris encroached on neighboring properties. After years of public outcry, clean-up efforts have begun and are set to be completed in February 2024.

This issue is one of many instances of illegal dumping in Camden City. About $4 million each year is spent on cleaning up illegal dumping in the city alone. In March 2022, a federally funded $500,000 project was announced by Congressman Donald Norcross, which consists of implementing a city-wide camera network to monitor and regulate illegal dumping areas and properly prosecute offenders.

== Environmental justice ==
Residents of Camden have expressed discontent with the implementation of pollution-causing facilities in their city. Father Michael Doyle, a pastor at Waterfront South's Sacred Heart Church, blamed the city's growing pollution and sewage problem as the reason why residents were leaving Camden for the surrounding suburbs. Local groups protested through petitions, referendums, and other methods, such as Citizens Against Trash to Steam (CATS), established by Linda McHugh and Suzanne Marks. In 1999, the St. Lawrence Cement Company reached an agreement with the South Jersey Port Corporation and leased land to establish a plant in the Waterfront South neighborhood of Camden, motivated to operate on state land by a reduction in local taxes.

St. Lawrence received a backlash from both the residents of Camden and Camden's legal system, including a lawsuit that accused the DEP and St. Lawrence of violating the Civil Rights Act of 1964, due to the overwhelming majority of minorities living in waterfront South and the already poor environmental situation in the neighborhood. The cement grinding facility, open year-round, processed approximately 850,000 tons of slag, a substance often used in the manufacturing of cement, and emitted harmful pollutants, such as dust particles, carbon monoxide, radioactive materials, and lead among others. Also, due to the diesel-fueled trucks being used to transport the slag, a total of 77,000 trips, an additional 100 tons of pollutants were produced annually. Despite backlash and legal proceedings, the cement facility remains in regular operation with no signs of shut-down.

== South Camden Citizens in Action v. New Jersey Department of Environmental Protection ==
In 2001, the SCCA filed a civil rights lawsuit against the NJDEP and the St. Lawrence Cement Company. Unlike other environmental justice cases, the lawsuit itself did not include specific accusations in regard to the environment, instead focusing on racial discrimination. The SCCA accused the NJDEP of discrimination after they issued air quality permits to St. Lawrence, which would have allowed the company to run a facility that violated Title VI of the Civil Rights Act of 1964. Title VI's role is to prevent agencies that receive federal funding from discriminating on the basis of race or nationality. Waterfront South, where the cement manufacturing company would operate, was a predominantly minority neighborhood that was already home to over 20% of Camden's dangerously contaminated sites.

In April 2001, the court, led by Judge Stephen Orlofsky, ruled in favor of the SCCA, stating that the NJDEP was in violation of Title VI, as they had not completed a full analysis of the area to judge how the environmental impact from the cement facility would affect the residents of Camden. This decision was challenged five days later with the ruling of US Supreme Court case Alexander v. Sandoval, which stated that only the federal agency in question could enforce rules and regulations, not citizens themselves. Orlofsky held his initial decision on the case and enacted another ruling that would allow citizens to make use of Section 1983, a civil rights statute which gave support to those whose rights had been infringed upon by the state, in regard to Title VI.

The NJDEP and St. Lawrence went on to appeal both of Orlofsky's rulings and the Third Circuit Court of Appeals subsequently reversed Orlofsky's second decision. The appeals court ruled that Section 1983 could not be used to enforce a ruling regarding Title VI and that private action could not be taken by the citizens. The final ruling in the case was that, while the NJDEP and St. Lawrence did violate Title VI, the decision could not be enforced through Section 1983. The lawsuit delayed the opening of the St. Lawrence cement facility by two months, costing the company millions of dollars. In the years following the court case, members of the SCCA were able to raise awareness concerning environmental justice at higher levels than before; they were portrayed in a positive light by news coverage in major platforms such as The New York Times, Business Week, The National Law Journal, and The Philadelphia Inquirer, and garnered support from long-time civil rights activists and the NAACP. The SCCA has engaged in several national events since the conclusion of South Camden, such as a press conference at the U.S. Senate, the Second National People of Color Environmental Leadership Summit, and the U.S. Commission on Civil Rights environmental justice hearings, all of which dealt with the advocacy of environmental justice.
