= Ann London Scott =

American feminist (1929–1975)

- Born: Clair Ann London; July 29, 1929; Seattle, Washington, U.S.
- Died: February 17, 1975 (aged 45); Baltimore, Maryland, U.S.
- Education: University of Washington
- Occupations: Academic, lobbyist
- Spouse: Thomas J. Scott
- Children: 1

Ann London Scott (July 29, 1929 – February 17, 1975) was an American feminist. She founded the Buffalo chapter of the National Organization for Women (NOW). As legislative vice president of the national organization in the early 1970s, she led the effort to ratify the Equal Rights Amendment. She was also a poet, translator, and English professor at the State University of New York at Buffalo (UB).

== Early life and education ==
She was born in Seattle, Washington, to Daniel Edwin London and Claire Chester London. In 1935 she moved with her family to San Francisco, California, where her father managed a luxury hotel. She attended the Dominican Convent School in San Rafael, California. She studied literature at the University of Washington, receiving a B.A. in 1954 and her doctorate in 1968. She wrote her dissertation on Shakespeare's use of language.

== Academic and literary career ==
She taught at the University of Washington during the early 1960s. In 1965 she moved to New York to teach at UB. During this period she published poetry in literary magazines such as Sage, Choice, and Poetry Northwest.

== Activism ==
She joined NOW in 1967 and led the formation of its Buffalo, New York, chapter. She was elected to the organization's national board in 1970. With NOW colleague Lucy Komisar, she lobbied for affirmative action guideline changes at the U.S. Department of Labor and the Federal Communications Commission.

In 1970, while teaching at UB, she published a controversial article in the university newspaper, The Reporter. Titled "The Half-Eaten Apple," the article was "one of the first attempts to examine alleged discrimination in the academic world," according to the New York Times. Scott never received tenure at UB, a fact she later attributed to the publication of the article.

In 1971 she was elected legislative vice president of NOW. That same year, she co-authored two feminist pamphlets, Business and Industry Discrimination Kit and And Justice for All, with Lucy Komisar. In 1973 she left UB to work full-time as a lobbyist for NOW and other groups. During her three terms as legislative vice president of NOW, Scott led the effort to ratify the Equal Rights Amendment and the Equal Employment Opportunity Act of 1972.

In addition to her work with NOW, she served on the national board of Common Cause, and as associate director of the American Association for Higher Education. She was also a member of the Leadership Conference on Civil and Human Rights, and worked on women's rights projects with the Modern Language Association.

== Personal life ==
She married Paul de Witt Tufts, a musician, in 1951. The marriage ended in 1954. She married again in 1956, to a poet named Gerd Stern, and had a son the following year; that marriage ended in 1961. In 1965 she married Thomas J. Scott, dean of the graduate division of the Maryland Institute College of Art.

She died of breast cancer at her home in Baltimore, Maryland, on February 18, 1975. In her memory, NOW established the Ann London Scott Award for Legislative Excellence, which is conferred each year on a female legislator. Her papers are on file in the UB Archives and the Schlesinger Library at Harvard.
