= Ellis Ruley =

American painter

- Ellis Ruley sitting with a pipe
- Born: Ellis Walter Ruley; December 3, 1882; Norwich, Connecticut, U.S.
- Died: January 16, 1959 (aged 76); Norwich, Connecticut, U.S.
- Known for: Painter
- Works: Adam and Eve; Daydreaming; Grapefruit Picking Time
- Spouses: Ida Bee; Wilhelmina Fox (m. 1933–1959)

Ellis Walter Ruley (December 3, 1882 – January 16, 1959) was an American folk artist and laborer. He began painting in the 1930s at his home in Norwich, Connecticut, using house paint on cardboard and Masonite. During his lifetime, Ruley sold his paintings locally and only achieved fame posthumously in the 1990s. Ruley worked almost his entire adult life in the construction trades, and had one daughter from his first marriage. Ruley died in 1959 under ambiguous circumstances. There is controversy surrounding his death, as it is unclear whether he died from an accident or as the result of murder.

== Early life in Norwich ==
Ellis Ruley was born on December 3, 1882, to Joshua Ruley and Eudora Robinson. Joshua Ruley and Robinson had four sons and two daughters, of which Ellis Ruley was the oldest. According to Diane Laiscell, a great granddaughter of Ellis Ruley, Ruley did not spend much time in school as he had to start working at an early age to help support his family.

Joshua Ruley married Eudora Robinson, who was born in Kingston, Rhode Island. According to Ellis Ruley’s great granddaughters, Delois C. Lindsey and Sheila L. Traynum, Robinson was born in 1851 and was of mixed African-American and Native American descent. One account describes Joshua Ruley as a runaway slave who was born in Wilmington, Delaware, in 1847 before escaping North at the end of the Civil War. Laiscell disagrees saying “What Joshua did and how he arrived in Norwich, we will never know. There is very little information about Joshua’s life.”

== Adult life ==
Ruley worked in construction and the remains of stone walls he built can still be found on his old homestead. Ruley was married twice. His first marriage was to Ida Bee, who died shortly after their daughter Marion was born in 1912. Ruley married a second time in 1933, to Wilhelmina Fox. The marriage was very unusual for the time, as Wilhelmina was white, and had been previously married to Ruley's brother, Amos Ruley.

In 1933, using part of the $8,500 he received in compensation for a work related truck accident, Ruley purchased 20 Hammond Avenue (now 28 Hammond Avenue) and began repairing the existing hundred-year-old house. Ruley renovated the property and installed gardens where he raised his own food. Diane Laiscell remembers him painting the animals and the forest surrounding his home.

By the 1950s Ruley was retired from work. During that time he endured racially hostile neighbors whom Laiscell remembers harassing their family. When Ruley died on January 16, 1959, "there was a strong feeling in the black community of Norwich that he had met with foul play."

== Artistic career ==
Daydreaming, Landscape with Lions, enamel house paint on cardboard

It is unclear when Ruley started to paint, since his work is undated. The art collector Glenn Palmedo-Smith estimates the year as "roughly 1939". By 1950, Ruley had met Joseph Gualtieri who was then Director of the Slater Memorial Museum. Gualtieri sponsored Ruley's sole art exhibit during his lifetime in December 1952. Ruley also participated in the annual outdoor art exhibit, "Art in the Open", sponsored by the Norwich Art School, where he would sell his paintings for $15 each. Gualtieri traveled to New York City in the early 1950s with some of Ruley's paintings to try to place them with art dealers, but was not successful; this did not seem to greatly disappoint Ruley.

It is unknown how many paintings Ruley created during his lifetime, or how many survive. Glenn Palmedo-Smith documented 62 surviving paintings in his 1993 book, Discovering Ellis Ruley. According to the City of Norwich's Ellis Walter Ruley Committee, by 2015, this number had increased to 64 paintings.

== Artistic style ==
Grapefruit Picking Time, oil painting

Ruley often painted scenes from everyday life in Norwich. According to Joseph Gualtieri, Ruley "always worked in house paint, painting subject matter that varied from wild animals – with a preference for lions—to bathing beauties, pastoral landscapes, cowboys, and Indians." Ruley had no technical training in painting, so his works generally exhibit a simple style. His work has been described by Glenn Palmedo-Smith as "otherworldly", as though the images were "captured from dreams". In Palmedo-Smith's opinion, Ruley's work captures complex narratives with simple imagery.

== Death ==
Ellis Ruley was found dead on the morning of January 17, 1959, on Hammond Avenue "about 200 feet from his house". His body was partly frozen. The Town Medical Examiner's opinion was that Ruley "died from exposure, although he lost considerable blood from a gash on the head". The Coroner believed Ruley's death was an accident.

The Norwich Police Department learned that Ruley had been at a restaurant in Norwich the previous evening, where he had been drinking. "He left the place in a taxi cab at 7pm, was driven to Hammond Avenue and helped to within 25 feet of his home by the cab driver."

According to the investigation that followed Ruley's death, the gash on his head was the result of falling and hitting his head on a stone wall. He was thought to be walking to or from his house. A local paper at the time reported that "Ruley, judging from the trail of blood extending for a distance of nearly 100 feet attempted to regain his feet but apparently lost all sense of direction. Stones in the wall were spattered with blood and it appeared that Ruley then staggered or stumbled in a circle and down a grade, back onto the Hammond road extension where he collapsed."

Members of Ruley's family were very suspicious, and believed that Ruley may have been murdered, possibly by a neighbor who wanted his property, or as a result of racial animosity. Supporting their suspicions were the earlier death of Douglas Harris, Ellis Ruley’s son-in-law, in 1948, who was found head first down a well on the property, and an unexplained fire which destroyed Ruley’s home after his death. Harris's death was found to be an accident by authorities at the time. An autopsy in 2014 by Dr. Michael Baden, a forensic pathologist, however, discovered that Harris's hyoid bone had been broken, indicating that he had been strangled prior to his death.

After performing an autopsy on Ruley, Baden determined that Ruley could have collapsed due to "some cardiac abnormality or from his brain disease" but also stated that it is possible that he could have been pushed by someone else, possibly the result of a robbery or altercation. He concluded that we cannot determine how Ruley actually fell on the night of his death. Because the circumstances surrounding Ruley's death are uncertain, Baden concluded that Ruley's death "cannot be categorized as a homicide." Baden also noted that Ruley's empty wallet had been found on Hammond Avenue about 20 feet from his body.

In 2019, Samuel Browning, a local attorney, presented his findings on Ruley's death concluding, "There are troubling unanswered questions concerning the facts that surround his demise ... but I do not have enough evidence to prove he was murdered." In Browning's opinion, the main problem with considering Ruley's death an accident is that while the cab driver who brought Ruley home "claimed he had dropped him off at the top of the hill, and watched him approach the door of the home ... in winter a cab driver would not likely have braved the steep gravel driveway, and was more likely to have dropped him off on the road." Browning thought the cab driver, a friend of cousin Harry E. Ruley Jr, had lied about where he had dropped Ruley off, perhaps because of embarrassment after Ruley was later found dead.

== Rediscovery, acclaim, and commemoration ==
In 1984, Glenn Palmedo-Smith found Ruley's painting Adam and Eve while at the antique market in Brimfield, Massachusetts. He was struck by the painting, claiming he had "glimpsed something wonderful, and a little sad, and more than a little mesmerizing." At the time Palmedo-Smith did not know who the artist was; he only discovered Ruley’s name and background through subsequent research that took him to Norwich Connecticut, where Mr. Gualtieri identified the painting, and told Palmedo-Smith it used to hang over Ruley’s couch.

After years of research, Palmedo-Smith wrote the book, Discovering Ellis Ruley, which provided photographic plates of all known Ruley works. The book was used as the catalog for a national tour of Ruley paintings that was underwritten by the Ford Motor Company and the Congressional Black Caucus Foundation. The exhibit opened in Atlanta, Georgia, in 1995 and had shows in museums in San Diego, Washington, D.C., New Orleans, New York City and Hartford, Connecticut.

In the 2010s, there was a renewal of interest in the art and life of Ruley. Best-selling author and Norwich native, Wally Lamb, wrote a character modeled on Ellis Ruley in his 2013 book, We Are Water.

In September 2015, the City of Norwich passed a resolution creating an Ellis Walter Ruley Committee to commemorate the local artist. The committee raised the money to create a park on the site of Ruley’s old homestead at 28 Hammond Avenue. After supervising construction, the committee had the park dedicated on July 27, 2018. From September 23 through December 7, 2018, the Slater Memorial Museum in Norwich, Connecticut featured an exhibit with eighteen of Ruley’s paintings.

As of July 2018, Glenn Palmedo-Smith was working on "a documentary about Ruley's life, art and his death" titled Unruley. Delois C. Lindsey was also working on her own documentary based on her book.
