= Zahid Quraishi =

American judge (born 1975)

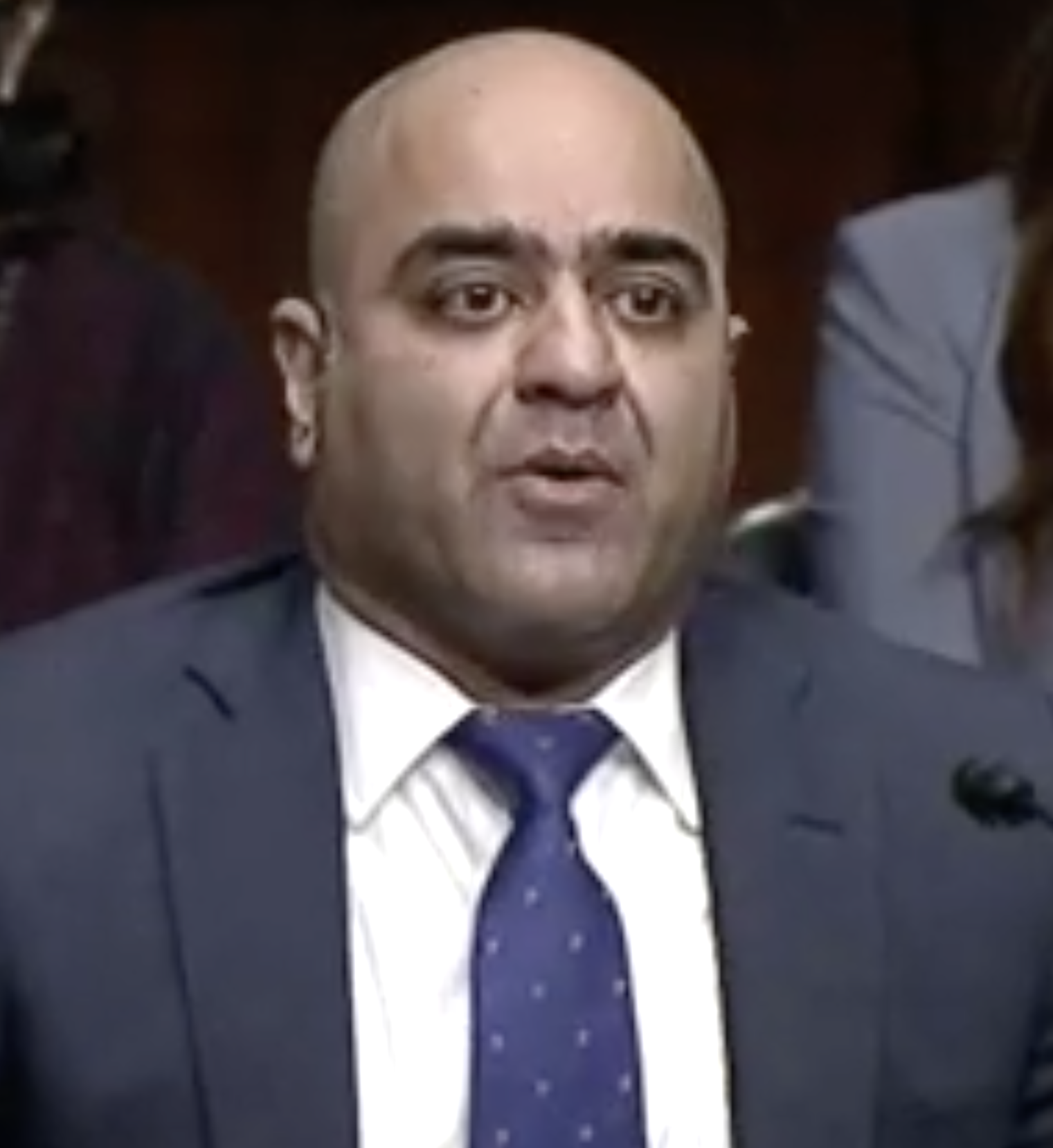

Judge of the United States District Court for the District of New Jersey
- Incumbent
- Assumed office June 22, 2021
- Appointed by: Joe Biden
- Preceded by: Peter G. Sheridan

Magistrate Judge of the United States District Court for the District of New Jersey
- In office June 3, 2019 – June 22, 2021

Personal details
- Born: 1975 (age 50–51) New York City, New York, U.S.
- Education: John Jay College of Criminal Justice (BA); Rutgers University (JD)

Military service
- Allegiance: United States
- Branch/service: United States Army
- Years of service: 2003–2007
- Rank: Captain
- Unit: United States Army Judge Advocate General's Corps; 1st Infantry Division
- Battles/wars: Operation Iraqi Freedom
- Awards: See list: Combat Action Badge Bronze Star Medal Army Commendation Medal (with oak leaf cluster) Army Achievement Medal (with oak leaf cluster) National Defense Service Medal Iraq Campaign Medal Global War on Terrorism Expeditionary Medal Global War on Terrorism Service Medal Army Overseas Service Ribbon Army Service Ribbon New Jersey Distinguished Service Ribbon

Zahid Nisar Quraishi (born 1975) is an American judge. He is a United States district judge of the United States District Court for the District of New Jersey and a former United States magistrate judge of the same court. He is the first Muslim Article III federal judge confirmed by the United States Senate.

== Early life ==
Quraishi was born in New York City and raised in Fanwood, New Jersey, by his parents Shahida P. Quraishi and Dr. Nisar A. Quraishi, immigrants from Pakistan. He graduated in 1993 from Scotch Plains-Fanwood High School. He received his Bachelor of Arts from the John Jay College of Criminal Justice in 1997, and his Juris Doctor from Rutgers Law School in 2000.

== Career ==
Upon graduating from law school, Quraishi served as a law clerk to Judge Edwin Stern of the New Jersey Superior Court from 2000 to 2001. From 2001 to 2003, he worked as a litigation associate at LeBoeuf, Lamb, Greene & MacRae in Newark, New Jersey.

=== Military service ===
In June 2003, Quraishi left private practice to serve in the United States Army Judge Advocate General’s Corps. Stationed first in Schweinfurt, Germany, he provided legal counsel to commanders.

In early 2004, he deployed to Tikrit, Iraq, during the early stages of Operation Iraqi Freedom. There Quraishi advised on detainee operations, rules of engagement, and military justice. Returning to Germany later that year, he resumed his duties until his second deployment in August 2006, this time to Ramadi, Iraq.

At the time his service ended in 2007, Quraishi was honorably discharged at the rank of Captain. He received the Bronze Star and Combat Action Badge. He remains a Selective Service registrant.

=== Legal career ===
In 2007, Quraishi became an assistant chief counsel in the Office of the Chief Counsel at U.S. Immigration and Customs Enforcement in New York City for approximately one year. He later became an Assistant United States Attorney for the United States Attorney's Office for the District of New Jersey, from 2008 to 2013. Before becoming a judge, Quraishi was an attorney at Morristown's Riker, Danzig, Scherer, Hyland & Perretti LLP, and was a partner at the firm from 2016–2019. Quraishi taught courses on trial presentation at Rutgers Law School in the fall of 2020 and spring of 2021.

=== Federal judicial service ===
Quraishi served as a United States magistrate judge of the United States District Court for the District of New Jersey, a position he was appointed to on June 3, 2019, and left in 2021 upon becoming a district judge. He was the first Asian-American to sit on the federal bench in New Jersey.

On March 30, 2021, President Joe Biden announced his intent to nominate Quraishi to serve as a United States district judge of the United States District Court for the District of New Jersey. Quraishi was recommended by Senator Cory Booker. Quraishi's nomination drew scrutiny from some Muslim American advocates, who criticized the Biden administration for sidestepping a number of Muslim American civil rights organizations to nominate Quraishi. Critics said many of Quraishi's legal positions are unknown, and that his past work for U.S. Immigration and Customs Enforcement and his role as a "detention advisor" in the Iraq war raised questions about his stance on civil rights. On April 19, 2021, his nomination was sent to the Senate. President Biden nominated Quraishi to the seat vacated by Judge Peter G. Sheridan, who assumed senior status on June 14, 2018.

On April 28, 2021, a hearing on his nomination was held before the Senate Judiciary Committee. On May 20, 2021, his nomination was favorably reported out of committee by a 19–3 vote. On June 10, 2021, the United States Senate invoked cloture on his nomination by an 83–16 vote. His nomination was confirmed later that day by an 81–16 vote. Upon confirmation, he became the first Muslim-American to serve on a federal district court as an Article III judge. He received his judicial commission on June 22, 2021.

==== Notable rulings ====
On January 31, 2023, he blocked a New Jersey law that allows the state to sue the gun industry because it violates the Protection of Lawful Commerce in Arms Act.

In 2024, Quraishi oversaw Kim v. Hanlon, a case brought by Senate candidate Andy Kim and others challenging the county line, a ballot design that allowed county party leaders to give preferential ballot placement to endorsed primary candidates. The New Jersey Globe called Quraishi "the most powerful person in New Jersey politics today" for his ability to end or maintain the controversial practice. On March 29, 2024, Quraishi issued an injunction against the county line, directing clerks to instead print ballots with candidates organized by office in randomized order for the 2024 Democratic primary election.

In February 2026, Quraishi ruled that the Justice and Homeland Security departments of the Trump administration had illegally detained persons under a law which was not applicable and had failed to inform his court about actions taken against the woman who brought the case. He stated that further detentions using the law would likely require sworn testimony by those agencies wishing to apply it, since the credibility of the New Jersey District Attorney's could no longer be considered reliable. He said that “the U.S. Attorney’s Office conceded to violating 72 orders issued in immigration habeas cases in this district alone.”

On July 31, 2026, Quraishi allowed a civil lawsuit brought by the plaintiff, former Princeton University student and Jewish United States Army veteran, David Piegaro, to proceed against the defendants, The Trustees of Princeton University and Kenneth E. Strother, Jr., a campus police officer, related to Piegaro's treatment during Princeton campus protests in response to the conflict in Gaza. Quraishi wrote that Piegaro "sufficiently pleads an excessive force claim against Strother" and "sufficiently pleads his malicious prosecution claim against both Strother and the Trustees." The judge ruled against dismissing Piegaro's claim of First Amendment retaliation, and further ruled that the "Plaintiff plausibly alleges that he was arrested without probable cause ... and remained detained while he sought medical treatment for his injuries. Such allegations are sufficient to state a claim for false arrest and imprisonment."

== See also ==
- List of American Muslims

Legal offices
Preceded by Peter G. Sheridan	Judge of the United States District Court for the District of New Jersey; 2021–present	Incumbent
