= David Friedland =

New Jersey state politician (1937–2022)

Member of the New Jersey Senate from the 32nd district
- In office January 1978 – April 11, 1980
- Preceded by: Joseph W. Tumulty
- Succeeded by: James Anthony Galdieri

Member of the New Jersey General Assembly
- In office 1966–1974
- Constituency: Hudson County (1966–68); District 12B (1968–72); 12th district (1972–74)

Personal details
- Born: December 20, 1937 Jersey City, New Jersey, U.S.
- Died: April 21, 2022 (aged 84)
- Party: Democratic
- Relatives: Brute Force (brother)
- Education: Stevens Academy
- Alma mater: Tufts University; Rutgers School of Law

David Joel Friedland (December 20, 1937 – April 21, 2022) was an American lawyer and Democratic Party politician who represented Hudson County, New Jersey in the New Jersey General Assembly from 1966 to 1974 and the New Jersey Senate from 1978 until his conviction on racketeering charges in 1980. While awaiting sentencing, Friedland disappeared in September 1985 by faking his death in a supposed drowning incident off Grand Bahama. He was one of the United States government's most wanted fugitives until 1987, when he was captured in the Maldives, where he had drawn attention to himself after establishing a successful chain of scuba diving shops.

== Early life and education ==
David Joel Friedland was born on December 20, 1937, in Jersey City, New Jersey. His father, Jacob Friedland, was a labor attorney who later served in the New Jersey General Assembly from 1939 until 1952. His brother Stephen Friedland later became a musician and songwriter known as Brute Force.

Friedland attended Stevens Academy in Hoboken and graduated from Tufts University in 1957. He received a law degree from Rutgers School of Law—Newark in 1960 and was admitted to the bar in 1961.

== Legal career ==
=== Jackman v. Bodine ===
In 1964, Friedland represented labor leaders Christopher Jackman and Winfield Chasmar Jr. in a lawsuit challenging the apportionment of the New Jersey Senate under the principle of one man, one vote, which the United States Supreme Court had applied to state legislatures in Reynolds v. Sims. In Jackman v. Bodine (1964), the Supreme Court of New Jersey ruled that the state's legislative apportionment formula, which was based on historical county boundaries and provided each county with a single state senator but weighted the vote of such senator according to the county's population, was unconstitutional under the Equal Protection Clause of the Fourteenth Amendment to the United States Constitution. The December 15, 1964 ruling resulted in the reapportionment of the New Jersey legislature. Subsequent rulings in the case, also argued before the state courts by Friedland, led to the appointment of a special commission in 1967 and further adjustments to ensure population equality between districts in 1969.

=== Ethical problems and suspension ===
On December 30, 1968, while Friedland was serving in the New Jersey General Assembly, assistant attorney general William J. Brennan III testified against Friedland as one of three legislators who were "entirely too comfortable with members of organized crime." The testimony stemmed from New Jersey State Police files alleging that Friedland acted as a middleman to suppress loan sharking charges against Joseph Zicarelli, the alleged boss of Hudson County organized crime. Friedland denied the allegations, claiming that he had been attempting to settle a usurious loan and had not talked to any witnesses against the loan shark. He demanded Brennan's resignation.

In February 1971, the New Jersey Supreme Court found that he had violated judicial ethics in his efforts to get charges against the alleged loan shark dropped. On July 27, 1971, the Court suspended Friedland from the practice of law for a period of six months. Friedland asserted that he had done nothing wrong and, claiming that "[t]here had been no charge of impropriety in connection with [his] legislative duties," stated that he would run for re-election and that he expected the Assembly would take no action against him.

== Political career ==
=== New Jersey General Assembly ===
Following the Jackman v. Bodine decision, Friedland was elected to the New Jersey General Assembly in 1965. He was re-elected in 1967, 1969, and 1971, serving from 1966 until 1974.

After the 1969 election, Friedland was elected minority leader of the Assembly by one vote against John J. Horn of Camden County. Despite the suspension of his law license during his third term in office, Friedland won re-election in 1971 by a wide margin over an independent challenger, with 47 percent of the vote.

==== 1972 speaker election ====
On January 11, 1972, Friedland was one of four Assembly Democrats (including fellow Hudson County legislators Michael Esposito and David Wallace, along with Joseph J. Higgins of nearby Elizabeth) who voted to elect Thomas Kean as speaker of the General Assembly over S. Howard Woodson, thereby giving the minority Republican Party control of the chamber. In exchange, Friedland was appointed chair of the bipartisan Assembly Conference Committee, which held influence over which bills received a floor vote.

Because Woodson was African American, other Assembly Democrats accused Friedland of racism and betrayal. Kenneth A. Gewertz of Gloucester County shouted that, "Jesus had Judas, and we have David Friedland." Friedland had wanted the speakership himself, but his party declined to support him following his involvement in the loan sharking case and suspension of his law license. Recent political scandals in Hudson County were also expected to reflect poorly on the party statewide.

In 1973, Friedland chose not to seek re-election after reformer Paul T. Jordan was elected mayor of Jersey City.

=== State Senate ===
In 1977, Jordan did not run for re-election, and Friedland successfully backed Thomas F. X. Smith in the May election for mayor of Jersey City, revitalizing his political career. In the June primary for state senator, he defeated incumbent Joseph W. Tumulty, the scion of an influential political family, with 77 percent of the vote. However, his term in the Senate was cut short and overshadowed by his indictment for federal tax evasion and witness tampering charges. He served until his April 1980 conviction, after which he resigned to focus on his appeal. He was succeeded by fellow Democrat James A. Galdieri, who took office in a November 1980 special election.

In 1978, Friedland was one of twenty-six senators to vote in favor of a bill restoring the death penalty for first degree murder. He cited the popular will and stated, "The fallacy of elitism is that it believes its judgments are superior to those of the common herd."

== Conviction and disappearance ==
In October 1979, Friedland and his father Jacob were indicted for accepting $360,000 in bribes to arrange a $4 million loan to companies controlled by Barry S. Marlin from the pension fund of Teamsters Local 701 in North Brunswick. Marlin was an attorney who had been convicted of stealing $43 million in various schemes. After his indictment, Friedland expressed confidence that he would be exonerated.

On April 11, 1980, Friedland and his father were convicted by a jury for accepting bribes, income tax evasion and obstruction of justice for asking a witness to lie to the grand jury. Friedland maintained his innocence but resigned immediately from office to devote his time to appealing the verdict. In 1982, he reached an agreement under which he would avoid prison in exchange for cooperation, including recording incriminating conversations with his former associates. In 1983, United States Attorney for the District of New Jersey W. Hunt Dumont was reported by The New York Times to be pursuing a major investigation of as many as 50 individuals based on evidence that Friedland had provided. The government later argued that Friedland deceived them and did not in fact cooperate.

While in the United States Federal Witness Protection Program, Friedland was hired by his former colleague and ally Joseph J. Higgins, and they made additional efforts to defraud the same pension fund.

=== Disappearance ===
On September 2, 1985, while awaiting sentencing, Friedland disappeared while scuba diving off Grand Bahama. Friedland was said to have taken pain killers before diving with a friend twelve miles off of the coast and had failed to surface. His body was not discovered in an air-sea search, and a warrant was issued for his arrest.

In fact, Friedland went on the run, using a fake United States passport and traveling under the alias of Richard Smith Harley. Over the next several years, he was traced to Kenya, Paris, Venice, Hong Kong and Singapore and became the fugitive most wanted by the United States Marshals Service. In December 1987, two years after his disappearance, he was arrested by officials in Malé, where he had been working as a scuba dive master. While in the Maldives, Friedland had done little to avoid attention, posing for a post card in which he was in scuba gear feeding a live shark with food held in his own mouth.

=== Capture and imprisonment ===
On December 28, 1987, Friedland was flown back to the United States under the custody of the U.S. Marshals Service and taken for arraignment in federal district court in Brooklyn. Upon his return, he vowed to fight the charges against him, but said that "it's good to be back in the United States." United States marshal Arthur Borinsky said, "The bottom line that David has told me is that he really got tired of running,"

In December 1987, Dickinson R. Debevoise ordered Friedland to serve a sentence of seven years in federal prison for his 1980 conviction, rejecting his pleas for leniency and claims that the U.S. Attorney's office had violated the terms of the 1982 agreement under which he became an informant.

In a January 1988 preliminary hearing in Friedland's trial for conspiracy to defraud the union pension fund, assistant U.S. Attorney Michael Chertoff told judge John F. Gerry that Friedland had contacted Libyan leader Muammar al-Gaddafi during his time in the Maldives as part of an effort to arrange "asylum in Libya or any anti-American country". In September 1988, Friedland entered a guilty plea to a count of conspiracy under the Racketeer Influenced and Corrupt Organizations Act (RICO) as part of deal with authorities under which mail fraud and wire fraud charges would be dropped. On December 2, 1988, he was sentenced on the RICO count to a fifteen-year sentence, to be served concurrently with the seven-year term applied by Debevoise for his original conviction.

On April 3, 1989, after Friedland declined an offer to pass on details of illegal drug activity in prison, U.S. Attorney Samuel Alito stated that his office would not make any promise to assist Friedland. However, Friedland later claimed that he had made a deal directly with Drug Enforcement Administration special agent Anthony Longarzo, under which he provided information leading to several arrests and drug seizures. In exchange, Longarzo was supposed to recommend to the court and the United States Parole Commission that Friedland's incarceration be shortened.

== Later life and death ==
Friedland served eight years of his sentence at the Federal Correctional Complex, Coleman in Coleman, Florida and was released to spend several months in a halfway house run by the Salvation Army in West Palm Beach, Florida. He was released from the halfway house in July 1997, after serving a total of nine years of his 15-year sentence. He found work with an advertising firm.

He died on April 21, 2022.

New Jersey General Assembly
Preceded by Multi-member district	Member of the New Jersey General Assembly from the Hudson County district 1966–1968	Succeeded by Constituency abolished
Preceded by Constituency established	Member of the New Jersey General Assembly from the 12B district 1968–1972; Served alongside: Alfred E. Suminski	Succeeded by Michael P. Esposito; William G. Wilkerson
Preceded by Constituency established	Member of the New Jersey General Assembly from the 12th At-large district 1972–1974	Succeeded by Constituency abolished
New Jersey Senate
Preceded by Joseph W. Tumulty	Member of the New Jersey Senate from the 32nd district 1978–1980	Succeeded by James Anthony Galdieri
