= Sidney M. Schreiber =

American judge (1914-2009)

Sidney Moses Schreiber (November 18, 1914 – August 5, 2009) was an associate justice of the New Jersey Supreme Court from 1975 to 1984. His notable opinions on the court include expanding citizen access to public beaches and increasing consumer protection from drug companies. He also serves in the United States Army from 1943 to 1946.

== Early life and military service ==
Born in New York City, Schreiber grew up in Elizabeth, New Jersey, where he attended Thomas Jefferson High School. He graduated Phi Beta Kappa from Yale University in 1936. He earned his law degree at Yale Law School in 1939.

== Legal career and military service ==
Schreiber began his legal career working as a staff attorney for the United States Railroad Retirement Board and the Securities and Exchange Commission. He put his personal career on hold in 1943, when he joined the United States Army during World War II. He served until 1946 and reached the position of lieutenant. Perhaps the highlight of his service was heading the War Crimes Review Section of the Judge Advocate's Office for the Third Army. In that position, he drafted documents for war crime trials involving German concentration camps.

After the war, Schreiber entered private practice. He served as a delegate to the 1966 New Jersey Constitutional Convention, which rewrote many of New Jersey's legislative articles. He also served as a Commissioner for the Union County Parks Commission.

Governor William T. Cahill nominated Schreiber to New Jersey Superior Court in Hudson County in October 1972. Schreiber was later promoted to the New Jersey Supreme Court by former Governor Brendan Byrne in 1975. He served on the court for nine years.

When he retired from the bench in 1984, Schreiber joined the law firm Riker, Danzig, Scherer, Hyland & Perretti, in Morristown, New Jersey.

In 1997 he was awarded with the William J. Brennan Award from the Association of the Federal Bar of New Jersey for his lifetime commitment to the New Jersey legal profession.

== Notable decisions ==
Schreiber was involved in many of the New Jersey Supreme Court's public-focused opinions of the late 1970s. During his tenure, he wrote the majority decisions that expanded the power of living wills, extended citizen access to public beaches, and clarified the responsibilities of drug companies to guard against suspected harmful side effects.

While on the bench, he also served as Chairman of the Supreme Court Committee on Civil Case Management and Procedures and as Chairman of the Committee on Budget and Procedure.

== See also ==
- List of Jewish American jurists
- List of justices of the Supreme Court of New Jersey
