= Riker Danzig =

American law firm

Riker Danzig LLP
- Headquarters: Madison, New Jersey, U.S.
- No. of offices: 3 offices
- No. of attorneys: c. 140
- Major practice areas: General practice
- Key people: Kelly Strange Crawford (Co-Chair); A.J. Borrelli (Co-Chair); Michael P. O'Mullan (Managing Partner)
- Date founded: 1882; 144 years ago
- Company type: Limited liability partnership
- Website: riker.com

Riker Danzig LLP is a law firm in the state of New Jersey. Founded in 1882, it is among the state's oldest firms. The firm is based in Madison, New Jersey and also has offices in Trenton, New Jersey, and New York City.

In 2018, Law360 ranked the firm as the 301st largest in the United States by headcount.

== History and practice areas ==
The origins of Riker Danzig trace back to 1882, when the firm Riker and Riker opened its practice in Newark, NJ. In 1948, the firm merged with Emerson, Emery & Danzig to form Riker, Emery & Danzig, creating one of the top litigation firms in the state, with numerous national clients included Fidelity Union Trust Company. The firm was called Riker, Danzig, Scherer, Hyland & Perretti from 1985 - 2022, and was shortened to its current form, Riker Danzig, in 2022.

Today, the firm has a broad range of practice areas, including significant practices in commercial litigation, energy, tax and trusts and estates, financial services, labor and employment, education law, corporate finance, mergers and acquisitions, insurance and reinsurance, real estate, environmental law and white collar criminal defense. The firm also has a very successful bankruptcy practice, representing large businesses in Chapter 11 proceedings. The firm also does lobbying work within the New Jersey State Legislature.

Twenty-three of the firm's practices were ranked in the top tier in New Jersey by U.S. News & World Report's "Best Law Firms" in 2021. These practice areas include arbitration, corporate law, commercial litigation, employment law, environmental law, government regulations, insurance law, mergers & acquisition law, products liability, real estate law.

== Notable lawyers and alumni ==
A number of state and national political figures have worked for the firm, including:

=== Attorneys General ===
- John J. Farmer, Jr., former New Jersey Attorney General who briefly served as Governor of New Jersey, served as an associate at the firm from 1988 to 1990.
- Peter C. Harvey, former New Jersey Attorney General under Governor Jim McGreevey and former partner of Riker Danzig.
- William F. Hyland, former New Jersey Attorney General under Governor Brendan Byrne, deceased.
- Nicholas Katzenbach, the former United States Attorney General and Under Secretary of State, became a partner at Riker Danzig after retiring as general counsel of IBM, deceased.
- Peter N. Perretti, Jr., former New Jersey Attorney General and former partner at the firm, deceased.

=== Elected officials ===
- William J. Hughes, former congressman for New Jersey's 2nd congressional district, formerly of counsel to the firm, deceased.

=== Appointed officials ===
- John Sheridan, former Transportation Commissioner and a senior partner in the firm until 2005, deceased.

=== Judiciary ===
- Dickinson Richards Debevoise, Senior District Judge on the United States District Court for the District of New Jersey, is a former partner at the firm, deceased.
- Marie Garibaldi, former partner who went on to become the first female Justice on the Supreme Court of New Jersey in 1982, deceased.
- Anne M. Patterson, current New Jersey Supreme Court justice, former partner of Riker Danzig.
- Stewart G. Pollock, former New Jersey Supreme Court justice, currently of counsel to the firm.
- Sidney M. Schreiber, former New Jersey Supreme Court justice, deceased.
- Victor Ashrafi, former Judge of the Appellate Division of the Superior Court of New Jersey, currently of counsel to the firm.
- James S. Rothschild, Jr., former Judge of the Superior Court of New Jersey, Essex County, currently of counsel to the firm.
- Travis L. Francis, former Assignment Judge of the Superior Court of New Jersey, Middlesex County, currently of counsel to the firm.
- Zahid Quraishi, former partner who was appointed a United States Magistrate Judge for the District of New Jersey on June 3, 2019, becoming the first Asian-American to sit on the federal bench in New Jersey. On March 30, 2021, he was nominated as a United States district judge of the United States District Court for the District of New Jersey. Upon his June 10, 2021 confirmation, he became the first Muslim-American to serve on a federal district court as an Article III judge.
- Renee Marie Bumb, former associate who was appointed Chief Judge of the United States District Court for the District of New Jersey in 2023, and Judge of the United States District Court for the District of New Jersey in 2006.
