= Joseph W. Tumulty =

American politician (1914-1996)

Member of the New Jersey Senate from the 32nd district
- In office January 8, 1974 – January 10, 1978
- Preceded by: District created
- Succeeded by: David Friedland

Personal details
- Born: October 1, 1914 Jersey City, New Jersey, U.S.
- Died: December 20, 1996 (aged 82) Jersey City, New Jersey, U.S.
- Party: Democratic
- Spouse: Catherine (d. 1990)
- Education: Columbia University; Fordham University School of Law

Joseph W. Tumulty (October 1, 1914 – December 20, 1996) was an American Democratic Party politician from Jersey City, New Jersey, who represented the 32nd Legislative District for one term in the New Jersey Senate. He was the nephew of White House secretary Joseph Patrick Tumulty and cousin of U.S. Representative T. James Tumulty.

He was born in Jersey City in 1914 and attended Lincoln High School, earned a B.A. from Columbia University, and a law degree from Fordham University School of Law.

Upon joining the New Jersey Bar, he worked as an attorney in various fields including for the City of Jersey City and Provident Bank. He was elected to the New Jersey Senate in 1973 in the new 32nd District, encompassing parts of Jersey City and North Bergen. However, four years later, he was defeated by former Assemblyman David Friedland by a margin of 77% to 23%. Friedland had the backing of Jersey City Mayor-elect Thomas F. X. Smith.

A resident of Bayonne, New Jersey, Tumulty died on December 20, 1996, at Christ Hospital in Jersey City.
