= James J. Galdieri =

American politician

James J. Galdieri (May 3, 1896 – April 27, 1944) was an American Democratic Party politician from Jersey City who was elected to a single term representing portions of Hudson County in the New Jersey General Assembly.

== Biography ==
Galdieri was born on Staten Island on May 3, 1896 and moved to Jersey City, where he graduated from William L. Dickinson High School and Saint Peter's College. He received his law degree from the New Jersey Law School (now Rutgers School of Law—Newark). He was one of 199 attorneys admitted to practice in the New Jersey bar in 1931, of 430 who had taken the bar exam that October. Galdieri was elected to the New Jersey General Assembly that year, serving a single term from 1932 to 1933.

After leaving the General Assembly, Galdieri served as secretary to Jersey City Commissioner William J. McGovern, and then filled the same position for Frank H. Eggers (a future Mayor of Jersey City), who had filled McGovern's commission seat. At the time of his death, he was secretary to City Commissioner Arthur Potterton.

Galdieri died at age 47 in his Jersey City home on April 28, 1944 after suffering a heart attack.

== Legacy ==
He was survived by his wife, the former Virginia Baratta, a daughter and two sons. His son James A. Galdieri was also an attorney and Democratic Party politician who won a November 1980 special election to fill the unexpired portion of the New Jersey Senate seat vacated by David Friedland, who had been convicted of bribery charges related to a loan made by a Teamsters pension fund.
