= James Anthony Galdieri =

American politician

James Anthony Galdieri (November 7, 1934 – May 16, 2009) was an American Democratic Party politician from Jersey City who was elected to represent portions of Hudson County in the New Jersey Senate in a special election held to fill a vacancy created when a sitting member of the Senate was removed.

== Biography ==
Galdieri was born in Jersey City, the son of James J. Galdieri, who had served a single term as a member of the New Jersey General Assembly in 1932 and 1933. He attended Seton Hall University and after graduating there moved on to New York University School of Law where was awarded a law degree. He was a general counsel at the Jersey City Housing Authority.

In November 1980, Galdieri won a special election to fill the unexpired portion of the New Jersey Senate seat vacated by fellow Democrat David Friedland, who had been convicted of bribery charges related to a loan made by a Teamsters pension fund. At the time of his taking office, the district covered North Bergen and portions of Jersey City. The district was changed significantly in redistricting based on the results of the 1980 United States census, and Galdieri decided not to run for election in the district he had been relocated to.

He was nominated in 1983 to serve on the Hackensack Meadowlands Development Commission by Governor of New Jersey Thomas Kean, where he advocated for constriction of a food distribution center in Jersey City, North Bergen and Secaucus which was never approved.

Galdieri had moved to Verona in 2003 and retired from the firm of Miller & Galdieri in 2006. He died at age 74 on May 15, 2009 and was interred at Holy Name Cemetery, Jersey City. He was survived by his wife, a daughter, three sons and three grandchildren, Steel, Skyler, and Mariella Galdieri.

New Jersey political consultant Sean Caddle pleaded guilty in the 2014 murder-for-hire plot of James Anthony Galdieri's son Michael L. Galdieri. The case's similarities to the deaths of former state Transportation Commissioner John Sheridan and his wife—also stabbed in their Skillman home with a fire set in an attempt to destroy evidence—have led to that case being reopened.

New Jersey Senate
Preceded by David Friedland	Member of the New Jersey Senate from the 32nd district November 10, 1980–January 12, 1982	Succeeded by Frank E. Rodgers
