= Michael Baden =

American pathologist (born 1934)

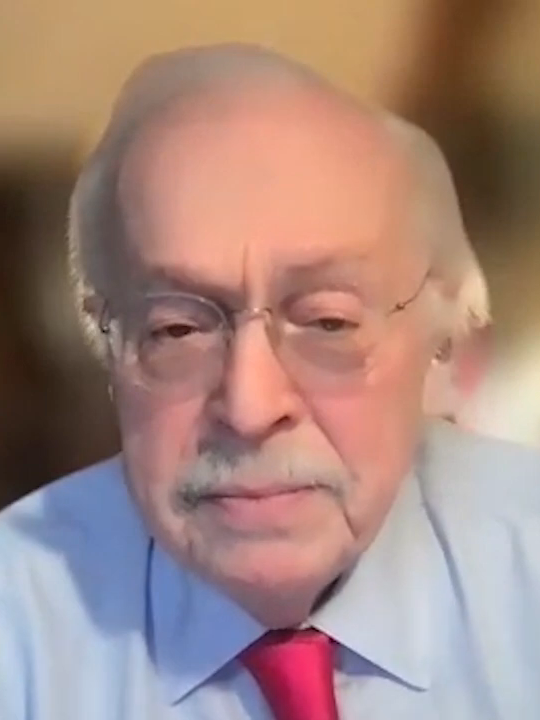
- Baden in 2023
- Born: July 27, 1934 (age 92); The Bronx, New York, U.S.
- Education: City College of New York (B.S.); New York University (M.D.)
- Known for: Testimony in the O. J. Simpson trial; Investigations of the John F. Kennedy and Martin Luther King assassinations; Investigations of the deaths of John Belushi, Jeffrey Epstein, Michael Brown, Carmine Galante, and George Floyd
- Spouse: Linda Kenney
- Children: 4
- Medical career
- Profession: Pathologist
- Institutions: Albert Einstein College of Medicine; Albany Medical College; New York University; New York Law School
- Sub-specialties: Forensic pathology

Michael M. Baden (born July 27, 1934) is an American physician and board-certified forensic pathologist known for his work investigating high-profile deaths and as the host of HBO's Autopsy. Baden was the chief medical examiner of the City of New York from 1978 to 1979. He was also chairman of the House Select Committee on Assassinations' Forensic Pathology Panel that investigated the assassinations of John F. Kennedy and Martin Luther King Jr.

== Early life and education ==
Baden was born in the Bronx, New York, on July 27, 1934, to a Jewish family from Russian Poland. He graduated at the top of his class from the City College of New York in 1955. He received his medical degree from New York University School of Medicine in 1960. He completed a pathology residency at Bellevue Hospital.

== Professional career ==
=== New York City ===
Baden was the chief medical examiner of the City of New York from 1978 to 1979, but was removed from his position by New York City Mayor Ed Koch, after Koch had received complaints about his work, including memos from district attorney Robert Morgenthau and city health commissioner Reinaldo Ferrer, documenting their criticism of Baden for "sloppy record keeping, poor judgment, and a lack of cooperation". In 1979, Baden's onetime lawyer Robert Tanenbaum defended his autopsy methods, while also acknowledging his lack of cooperation with the New York establishment. Baden later won $100,000 in a wrongful-termination suit. The reinstatement was later overturned by a higher court.

=== HSCA ===
Baden was chairman of the House Select Committee on Assassinations' Forensic Pathology Panel that investigated the assassination of John F. Kennedy. He was interviewed for the 2023 documentary JFK: What the Doctors Saw.

=== Later career ===
Afterward, Baden was hired as deputy medical examiner for Suffolk County, but was dismissed for allegedly making inappropriate comments about how to commit the perfect murder. An article in Oui Magazine quoted him describing how to get away with "high tech murder," but Baden strongly denied making the statement. The decision to let him go was rescinded shortly thereafter, as the circumstances of his alleged comments were unclear, but Baden chose to leave the position nonetheless.

Baden maintains a private forensic pathology consulting practice. He has been a consulting or lead pathologist and an expert witness on a number of other high-profile cases and investigations. He testified at Sergeant Evan Vela's court martial, and on behalf of Phil Spector at the latter's murder trial, while Baden's wife served as Spector's defense attorney. He has been hired to conduct private autopsies in a number of cases, including the shooting of Michael Brown and the deaths of New England Patriots football player Aaron Hernandez, civil rights lawyer and politician Chokwe Lumumba, George Floyd and African-American artist Ellis Ruley.

Baden was a Forensic Science Contributor for Fox News, and a frequent guest on Fox's late-night satirical program Red Eye where he was known as the "Death Correspondent". Baden also had his own television series on HBO: Autopsy.

Some of his opinions have been considered controversial, especially where he has opposed the findings of the county coroner. New York Magazine journalist Sarah Weinman labeled Baden as a "celebrity pathologist."

== Notable cases ==
Baden's independent autopsy findings are often in conflict with the local authorities' opinions; as such, many consider him to be a headline-seeking physician as opposed to a legitimate source of information.

=== O.J. Simpson ===
Baden testified in the O.J. Simpson trial on August 10 and 11, 1995, and made two claims that he later disowned. First, he claimed that Nicole Brown was still standing and conscious when her throat was slashed. The purpose of this claim was to dispute the theory that Brown was the intended target. The prosecution argued that Brown was murdered first and the intended target because the soles of her feet didn't have any blood on them despite the large amount of blood at the crime scene and that she was unconscious when her throat was cut because she had very few defensive wounds. At the subsequent civil trial the following year he disowned that claim and admitted it was absurd to think that someone would stand still without moving their feet while their throat is being slashed and not fight back.

Baden then claimed that Ron Goldman remained conscious and fought with his assailant for at least ten minutes with a severed jugular vein. The purpose of this testimony was to extend the length of time it took the murders to happen to the point where Simpson had an alibi. At the subsequent civil trial he initially denied making that claim and then after being confronted with a video clip of him saying it at the criminal trial, he disowned it. Baden claimed he misunderstood the question but the Goldmans' attorney allege he said it because the defense paid him to do so. He also alleged that Baden knowingly gave false testimony because he knew that Ron Goldman's blood was found inside Simpson's Bronco despite Goldman never having an opportunity within his lifetime to be in Simpson's car.

After the trial, Baden said that testifying for Simpson was a mistake as his reputation and credibility never recovered and his clientele for his consulting practice all but vanished. Because of the negative reaction to the acquittal by the public, the jurors stating they believed his two aforementioned claims that he later disowned, and the trial being televised making his testimony widely known, he was constantly being made to rehash his testimony from the Simpson case during cross-examination in other cases and constantly being discredited for allegedly being a "rented expert" who sold himself to Simpson and deliberately gave misleading testimony in order to collect a $165,000 retainer.

=== Phil Spector ===
In 2007, Baden testified on his new theory on the death of music producer Phil Spector's victim. He sought to provide an alternate explanation for blood on the victim's jacket. When asked by a prosecutor if he had any conflicts of interest, Baden replied "None that I can think of." It was later revealed that his wife was one of Spector's main attorneys.

=== John and Joyce Sheridan ===
Baden was hired by the sons of former New Jersey state Transportation Commissioner John Sheridan to work with the county medical examiner doing the autopsy on Sheridan and his wife after their 2014 deaths in a fire at their Skillman home. The Somerset County prosecutor's office eventually found their deaths to be a murder-suicide. Baden believed that there was enough evidence contradicting that theory and suggesting the possibility of an intruder in the house that while Joyce Sheridan's death was definitely a homicide, her husband's should be considered undetermined; he was able to persuade the county medical examiner to indicate definitely in the autopsy report that the knife responsible for some of John Sheridan's wounds was not any of those recovered at the crime scene, as well as that some of the DNA on one of the knife handles was not John Sheridan or anyone related to him. In 2017, the state's chief medical examiner formally changed the manner of John Sheridan's death from suicide to undetermined, after an open letter whose signatories included three former governors, two former state attorneys general and one sitting justice of the state Supreme Court, urged the change.

=== Michael Brown ===
At the request of the family of Michael Brown, Baden conducted a four-hour autopsy. The body had been washed and embalmed, and he did not have clothing or x-rays to examine for gunpowder residue or bullet locations. He determined his evidence was insufficient to forensically reconstruct the shooting.

=== Jeffrey Epstein ===
In October 2019, Baden was hired by Mark Epstein, Jeffrey Epstein's brother, and observed the autopsy done by city officials following Epstein's death in custody at a federal facility in New York City on sex trafficking charges. Baden disputed New York City chief medical examiner Barbara Sampson's conclusion that Epstein's death was a suicide, asserting that three fractures in Epstein's neck were more consistent with homicide by strangulation and rarely seen in suicide by hanging. Baden has stated that the autopsy "points to homicide".

=== George Floyd ===
In late May 2020, Baden and Allecia M. Wilson, a pathologist and director of autopsy and forensic services at the University of Michigan Medical School and owner of Michigan Autopsy & Medicolegal Consulting, PLLC, were hired by the family of George Floyd to perform an autopsy following Floyd's murder by Derek Chauvin, a Minneapolis police officer. From the evidence available to them, which did not include a toxicology report or unspecified bodily samples, Baden and Wilson announced on June 1 that Floyd's death was caused by asphyxia due to neck and back compression and that Floyd had no underlying medical problem that contributed to his death. Their results conflicted with the autopsy performed by Andrew Baker, a pathologist and the chief medical examiner for Hennepin County since 2004, which found that the cause of death was "cardiopulmonary arrest complicating law enforcement subdual, restraint, and neck compression."

== Personal life ==
Baden's first marriage, which ended in 1997, was to Judianne Densen-Gerber, a physician and founder of the drug treatment program Odyssey House; together they had four children. Baden later married Linda Kenney Baden, who served as one of Phil Spector's main attorneys during his capital murder trial and replaced Bruce Cutler after his withdrawal from the proceedings.

Preceded by Dominick DiMaio	New York City Chief Medical Examiner; 1978–1979	Succeeded by Elliot M. Gross
