= Stephen Orlofsky =

American judge

Stephen Murray Orlofsky

Judge of the United States District Court for the District of New Jersey
- In office December 26, 1995 – August 31, 2003
- Appointed by: Bill Clinton
- Preceded by: Dickinson R. Debevoise
- Succeeded by: Peter G. Sheridan

Magistrate Judge of the United States District Court for the District of New Jersey
- In office 1976–1980

Personal details
- Born: Stephen Murray Orlofsky; June 24, 1944 (age 81) The Bronx, New York, U.S.
- Education: City College of New York (B.A.); Rutgers School of Law–Camden (J.D.)

Stephen Murray Orlofsky (born June 24, 1944) is an American lawyer, a former United States district judge of the United States District Court for the District of New Jersey and a former nominee to be a United States circuit judge of the United States Court of Appeals for the Third Circuit.

== Early life and education ==
Born in The Bronx, New York, Orlofsky has a Bachelor of Arts degree in 1965 from City College of New York and a Juris Doctor from Rutgers School of Law–Camden in 1974. He also served in the United States Army from 1966 until 1970, spending time in Vietnam.

== Professional career ==
Orlofsky worked as a law clerk for United States District Judge Mitchell Harry Cohen from 1974 to 1976, when he became a United States Magistrate of the United States District Court for the District of New Jersey, serving in Camden, New Jersey. He went into private practice in Cherry Hill Township, New Jersey from 1980 to 1995, when he became a United States District Judge.

== Federal judicial service ==
=== District court service ===
On June 30, 1995—on the recommendation of United States Senator Frank Lautenberg—President Bill Clinton nominated Orlofsky to become a United States District Judge for the United States District Court for the District of New Jersey. The Senate unanimously confirmed Orlofsky in a voice vote on December 22, 1995. He received his commission on December 26, 1995.

=== Failed nomination to the Third Circuit ===
On May 25, 2000, President Clinton nominated Orlofsky to the United States Court of Appeals for the Third Circuit to replace Judge Morton Ira Greenberg, who had announced plans to take senior status. "It has always been my dream since the day I started clerking for Judge (Mitchell H.) Cohen to be a federal judge," Orlofsky told the Philadelphia Inquirer in an article that was published on May 26, 2000. "And those things (judgeships) don't come along all the time." With Republicans in control of the Senate in the final year of Clinton's presidency, however, Orlofsky's nomination languished, never receiving a hearing before the Senate Judiciary Committee. Orlofsky's nomination to the Third Circuit expired at the end of Clinton's presidency, and President Bush chose not to renominate him. In March 2003, President George W. Bush nominated Michael Chertoff to the Third Circuit seat to which Orlofsky had been nominated. Chertoff was confirmed by the Senate later that year.

== Resignation and post-judicial career ==
On February 19, 2003, Orlofsky announced that he was resigning from the bench to return to private practice at his former firm, Blank Rome LLP. His resignation took effect on August 31, 2003. In an article that appeared in the Cherry Hill Courier-Post on February 20, 2003, Orlofsky told the paper that he wasn't bitter about being denied a spot on the Third Circuit. "I'm leaving for new professional challenges," he told the Courier-Post. "I love the interactions of lawyers, of witnesses and jurors. But I hate the tedium of guns-and-drug cases." He also told the paper that he hadn't gone looking for a new job. "The opportunity came up," he said.

== See also ==
- Bill Clinton judicial appointment controversies

Legal offices
Preceded by Dickinson R. Debevoise	Judge of the United States District Court for the District of New Jersey; 1995–2003	Succeeded by Peter G. Sheridan
