= Lucy Komisar =

American journalist (born 1942)

Lucy Komisar (born 1942) is a New York City-based investigative journalist and drama critic.

Komisar was editor of the Mississippi Free Press in Jackson, Mississippi from 1962 to 1963. The weekly covered the civil rights movement and related political and labor issues and was read mainly by black people in Mississippi. The newspapers and her other civil rights papers are archived at the University of Southern Mississippi, Hattiesburg.

== Career ==
Komisar was a national vice-president of the National Organization for Women from 1970 to 1971 and was successful, with Legislative VP Ann London Scott, in getting the US government to extend federal contractor and cable TV affirmative action rules to women.

On August 10, 1970, she braved hecklers and having a mug of beer thrown over her to be one of the first unaccompanied women ever to have a drink at McSorley's Old Ale House in New York city, an all-male institution since 1854.

Her NOW papers are in the Schlesinger archives at Harvard University.

In 1977, Komisar became an associate of the Women's Institute for Freedom of the Press (WIFP). WIFP is an American nonprofit publishing organization. The organization works to increase communication between women and connect the public with forms of women-based media.

Komisar exposed the practice of Sodexo, a major provider of food to schools, colleges, hospitals, companies and other institutions, of demanding and getting kickbacks from its suppliers. The article appeared in March 2009 in In These Times.

In 2010, Komisar received the Gerald Loeb Award for Medium & Small Newspapers for "Keys to the Kingdom: How State Regulators Enabled a $7 Billion Ponzi Scheme".

In March 2023, Komisar wrote an article criticizing the documentary film Navalny, winner of the 2023 Academy Award for Best Documentary Feature Film. Eliot Higgins of the Bellingcat investigative journalism group accused Komisar of writing the article with the help of artificial intelligence and referencing "fictional sources." The article was published in the fringe news website The Grayzone, then amended with corrected sources, and later removed at Komisar's request; she subsequently published a version on her own website.

== Bibliography ==
- The New Feminism (New York: Franklin Watts, 1972; Paperback Library, 1972), primer on feminism, including history, law, work, education and origins of contemporary movement.
- Down and Out in the U.S.A. A History of Public Welfare (New York: Franklin Watts, 1973 and 1977; New Viewpoints, 1973 and 1977), history of the American welfare system from colonial times to the present.
- Corazon Aquino: The Story of a Revolution (New York: George Braziller, 1987), political biography of Corazon Aquino, former president of the Philippines. (Zurich: Benziger Verlag, 1988; Manila: The National Bookstore, 1988)
