= Peter G. Sheridan =

American judge (born 1950)

Senior Judge of the United States District Court for the District of New Jersey
- Incumbent
- Assumed office June 14, 2018

Judge of the United States District Court for the District of New Jersey
- In office June 12, 2006 – June 14, 2018
- Appointed by: George W. Bush
- Preceded by: Stephen Orlofsky
- Succeeded by: Zahid Quraishi

Personal details
- Born: April 21, 1950 (age 75) Cambridge, Massachusetts, U.S.
- Education: Saint Peter's College (BS); Seton Hall University (JD)

Peter G. Sheridan (born April 21, 1950) is a senior United States district judge of the United States District Court for the District of New Jersey.

== Education and career ==
Sheridan was born in Cambridge, Massachusetts. He received a Bachelor of Science degree from St. Peter's College (now Saint Peter's University) in 1972 and a Juris Doctor from Seton Hall University School of Law in 1977. He was a law clerk for Judge James J. Petrella of the Superior Court of New Jersey, County of Bergen from 1977 to 1978. He was an attorney for the Office of New Jersey Solicitor, Port Authority of New York/New Jersey from 1978 to 1981. He was in private practice in New Jersey, from 1981 to 1984 and from 1990 to 2006. He was a vice president and general counsel for the Atlantic City Casino Association from 1984 to 1987. He was a director of authorities unit for the Office of Governor Thomas Kean from 1987 to 1990. He was an executive director for the New Jersey Republican State Committee from 1993 to 1994.

=== Federal judicial service ===
Sheridan was nominated by President George W. Bush on February 14, 2006 to serve as a United States district judge of the United States District Court for the District of New Jersey. He was nominated to a seat vacated by Judge Stephen Orlofsky. He was confirmed by the United States Senate on June 8, 2006, and received his commission on June 12, 2006. He assumed senior status on June 14, 2018.

=== Notable cases ===
- Oshinsky v. New York Football Giants, 2009 WL 4120237 (D.N.J. 2009), denied defendant’s motion for summary judgment on plaintiff’s breach of contract claims, but granted summary judgment as to all other claims. Plaintiff, a New York Giants season ticketholder, sued the team because it required season ticketholders, who wished to continue to purchase season tickets in the New Meadowlands Stadium, to purchase a personal seat license (PSL), which costs up to $20,000 a seat, on top of the cost of the season tickets themselves.
- American Broadcasting Companies, Inc. v. Wells, --- F.Supp.2d ----, 2009 WL 3417589 (D.N.J. 2009), granted preliminary injunction allowing media to conduct exit polling within a hundred feet of polling places, after the New Jersey Supreme Court had upheld a policy by the New Jersey Attorney General prohibiting the practice.

Legal offices
Preceded by Stephen Orlofsky	Judge of the United States District Court for the District of New Jersey; 2006–2018	Succeeded by Zahid Quraishi
