= Sean Caddle =

New Jersey Democratic operative

- Citizenship: United States
- Occupation: Political consultant
- Political party: Democrat
- Criminal charges: Conspiracy to commit murder
- Penalty: 24 years in prison

Details
- Victims: Michael Galdieri
- State: New Jersey

Sean Caddle is a longtime Democratic political consultant from New Jersey. Caddle has served as a consultant for numerous New Jersey politicians, including Bob Menendez, Lou Manzo, and Raymond Lesniak. He has also served as the executive director of the Committee for Economic Growth and Social Justice, a SuperPAC linked to New Jersey State Senator Raymond Lesniak. Outside of New Jersey, he served as director of Houston Votes, a Harris County, Texas voter registration organization that was accused of submitting falsified voter registration cards during the 2010 election cycle.

In January 2022, Caddle admitted to hiring two men to assassinate Michael Galdieri, a Jersey City, New Jersey politician who had been stabbed to death in May 2014.

== Political career ==
=== U.S. Senator Bob Menendez ===
Between 2003 and 2005, Caddle collected over $80,000 while performing political consulting for U.S. Senator Bob Menendez.

=== Houston Votes ===
In 2010, Caddle served as the director of Houston Votes, a voter registration organization which was accused of fraudulently submitting thousands of falsified voter registration cards and subsequently fired about two dozen employees. A voting machine warehouse in Houston was later set on fire, destroying ten thousand voting machines and sparking an arson investigation.

One year after the allegations were made against Houston Votes, an investigation into alleged voter fraud ended without charges being filed. Democratic congressmen derided the investigation into the organization as being politically motivated, while Republican officials defended the investigation, citing Caddle's admission that the organization's staffers had submitted fraudulent voter registration cards to Harris county.

=== Raymond Lesniak ===
Caddle served as a longtime operative of Raymond Lesniak, a now-retired New Jersey State Senator from Elizabeth, New Jersey. In 2011, while Lesniak was facing re-election to the New Jersey Senate, Caddle served as Lesniak's field director. In 2014 Caddle became executive director of Committee for Economic Growth and Social Justice, a pro-Lesniak SuperPAC. In 2015, Caddle raised $150,000 for Lesniak through "Run Ray Run", a Caddle-created political action committee that sought to raise funds for Lesniak's 2017 New Jersey gubernatorial Democratic primary election campaign. By January 2017, Caddle served as Lesniak's campaign manager for the race.

== Assassination of Michael Galdieri ==
In January 2022, Caddle pleaded guilty to conspiracy to commit murder and admitted to hiring two men in order to assassinate Michael Galdieri, a politician from Jersey City. Galdieri, the son of Hudson County, New Jersey politician James Anthony Galdieri, was stabbed to death on May 22, 2014 in his apartment. Following Galdieri's assassination, his apartment was set on fire; investigators believe that the fire was set in order to cover up evidence of stab wounds. Galdieri had been an employee of Caddle before being stabbed to death. Caddle was convicted of the murder following his guilty plea. Following the conviction, Caddle's sentencing was initially scheduled for June 7, 2022, though the sentencing was later delayed to December 7, 2022. After further delays, he was sentenced to 24 years in prison on June 29, 2023. He is imprisoned at the federal prison at Fort Dix.

== Personal life ==
In 2015, Galdieri created Chainsaw Ventures, an entertainment firm that produce horror experiences, including several movie screenings and an overnight experience called "Slaughter Camp".
