= Dickinson R. Debevoise =

American judge (1924–2015)

Senior Judge of the United States District Court for the District of New Jersey
- In office May 1, 1994 – August 14, 2015

Judge of the United States District Court for the District of New Jersey
- In office November 2, 1979 – May 1, 1994
- Appointed by: Jimmy Carter
- Preceded by: Seat established by 92 Stat. 1629
- Succeeded by: Stephen Orlofsky

Personal details
- Born: Dickinson Richards Debevoise; April 23, 1924 Orange, New Jersey, U.S.
- Died: August 14, 2015 (aged 91) Summit, New Jersey, U.S.
- Education: Williams College (BA); Columbia Law School (LLB)

Dickinson Richards Debevoise (April 23, 1924 – August 14, 2015) was a United States district judge of the United States District Court for the District of New Jersey.

== Education and career ==
Born on April 23, 1924, in Orange, New Jersey, Debevoise received a Bachelor of Arts degree from Williams College in 1948. He received a Bachelor of Laws from Columbia Law School in 1951. He was in the United States Army as a Sergeant from 1943 to 1945, participating in D-Day, the Battle of the Bulge and the occupation of Berlin. He was in the United States Army as a Lieutenant from 1951 to 1953, during the Korean War. A law clerk for Judge Phillip Forman of the United States District Court for the District of New Jersey from 1952 to 1953, he was in private practice of law in Newark, New Jersey, from 1953 to 1979.

== Federal judicial service ==
Debevoise was nominated by President Jimmy Carter on September 28, 1979, to the United States District Court for the District of New Jersey, to a new seat created by 92 Stat. 1629. He was confirmed by the United States Senate on October 31, 1979, and received his commission on November 2, 1979. He assumed senior status on May 1, 1994, serving in that status until his death on August 14, 2015, in Summit, New Jersey.

== Notable cases ==
He was the judge in the 1981 civil lawsuit filed by the Democratic National Committee against the Republican National Committee alleging violations of the Civil Rights Act in the New Jersey gubernatorial election. He continued to supervise and extend the decree until his death in 2015.

In 1993, Debevoise was involved in the case USL v. BSDi. He presided over the arraignment of Unabomber Theodore Kaczynski in 1996.

== Personal ==
Debevoise and his wife Katrina had four daughters.

Legal offices
Preceded by Seat established by 92 Stat. 1629	Judge of the United States District Court for the District of New Jersey; 1979–1994	Succeeded by Stephen Orlofsky
