= Charles Haight (disambiguation) =

Charles Haight (1838–1891) was an American politician in the New Jersey General Assembly (1860–1862) and US House of Representatives (1867–1871).

Charles Haigt may also refer to:

- Charles C. Haight (1841–1917), American architect in New York City
- Charles Sherman Haight Sr. (1870–1938), American admiralty and shipping expert, founder of the Seamen's Church Institute of New York and New Jersey
- Charles S. Haight Jr. (born 1930), American lawyer and federal judge for the United States District Court for the Southern District of New York, grandson of Charles Sherman Haight Sr.
- SS Charles S. Haight, a WWII Liberty ship named for the US representative
