= Harland Bradley Howe =

American judge (1873–1946)

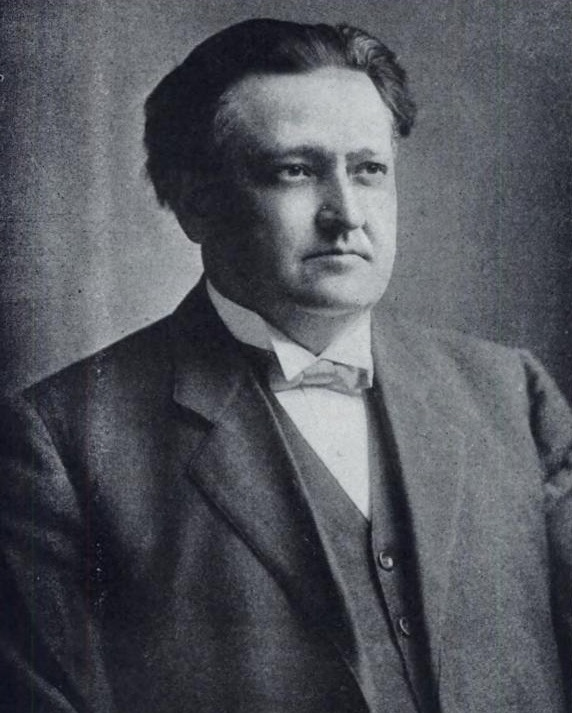
- From 1916's Analyzing Character

Senior Judge of the United States District Court for the District of Vermont
- In office January 31, 1940 – July 31, 1945

Judge of the United States District Court for the District of Vermont
- In office February 22, 1915 – January 31, 1940
- Appointed by: Woodrow Wilson
- Preceded by: James Loren Martin
- Succeeded by: James Patrick Leamy

Member of the Vermont House of Representatives from St. Johnsbury
- In office 1908–1910
- Preceded by: Harry H. Carr
- Succeeded by: Charles A. Calderwood

Personal details
- Born: Harland Bradley Howe; February 19, 1873 St. Johnsbury, Vermont
- Died: April 22, 1946 (aged 73) Burlington, Vermont
- Resting place: St. Johnsbury Center Cemetery, St. Johnsbury, Vermont
- Party: Democratic
- Spouse(s): Maybelle Jane Kelsey (m. 1900-1916, her death); Elizabeth Crump Johnson (m. 1931-1946, his death)
- Children: 4
- Education: University of Michigan Law School (LL.B.)
- Profession: Attorney

Harland Bradley Howe (February 19, 1873 – April 22, 1946) was a United States district judge of the United States District Court for the District of Vermont.

== Education and career ==
Howe was born in St. Johnsbury, Vermont, on February 19, 1873, the son of Worcester C. Howe and Rosaline (Bradley) Howe. He was educated in Caledonia County, Vermont, and graduated from Lyndon Institute. Originally trained as a harness maker, he contracted polio which left him unable to perform such demanding physical labor. He began to study law with an attorney in Lyndonville and afterwards attended the University of Michigan Law School. Unable to continue his studies after the first year because his funds were exhausted, he returned to Vermont and set up a collection agency in the law offices of Henry C. Bates, and the fees he earned enabled him to return to school. Howe received a Bachelor of Laws from the University of Michigan Law School in 1894, passed the bar and became an attorney. He was in private practice in St. Johnsbury from 1894 to 1915. A Democrat, in 1904, he was an unsuccessful candidate for the United States House of Representatives, losing to Kittredge Haskins. He was a member of the Vermont House of Representatives in 1908. In 1912 he was the unsuccessful Democratic candidate for Governor of Vermont, losing to Republican Allen M. Fletcher in a closer than usual contest as the result of a split between Republicans and Progressives, who nominated Fraser Metzger. In 1914, Howe lost the gubernatorial contest to Republican Charles W. Gates.

== Federal judicial service ==
Howe was nominated by President Woodrow Wilson on February 19, 1915, to a seat on the United States District Court for the District of Vermont vacated by Judge James L. Martin. He was confirmed by the United States Senate on February 22, 1915, and received his commission the same day. He assumed senior status due to a certified disability on January 31, 1940. His service terminated on July 31, 1945, due to his retirement. He resided in Burlington during his service and remained in Burlington after his retirement.

== Family ==
In 1900, Howe married Maybelle Jane Kelsey (1878–1916). In 1931, he married Elizabeth Crump Johnson (1880–1952). Howe was the father of four daughters.

== Death ==
Howe died in Burlington on April 22, 1946, and was buried at St. Johnsbury Center Cemetery (also known as Centervale Cemetery).

== Honors ==
Howe received an honorary LL.D. from Norwich University in 1930.

Party political offices
Preceded by Charles D. Watson	Democratic nominee for Governor of Vermont; 1912, 1914	Succeeded by William B. Mayo
Legal offices
Preceded by James Loren Martin	Judge of the United States District Court for the District of Vermont; 1915–1940	Succeeded by James Patrick Leamy
