= John Warren Davis (judge) =

American judge (1867–1945)

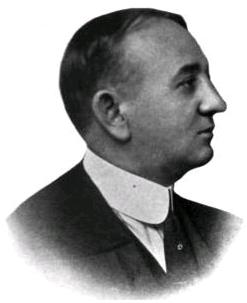
- Davis as seen in Scannell's New Jersey First Citizens: Biographies and Portraits of the Notable Living Men and Women of New Jersey

Senior Judge of the United States Court of Appeals for the Third Circuit
- In office April 15, 1939 – November 24, 1941

Judge of the United States Court of Appeals for the Third Circuit
- In office June 2, 1920 – April 15, 1939
- Appointed by: Woodrow Wilson
- Preceded by: Thomas Griffith Haight
- Succeeded by: Charles Alvin Jones

Judge of the United States District Court for the District of New Jersey
- In office May 15, 1916 – June 12, 1920
- Appointed by: Woodrow Wilson
- Preceded by: Seat established by 39 Stat. 48
- Succeeded by: Joseph Lamb Bodine

United States Attorney for the District of New Jersey
- In office 1913–1916
- Appointed by: Woodrow Wilson
- Preceded by: John Beam Vreeland
- Succeeded by: Charles Francis Lynch

Member of the New Jersey Senate from the Salem County district
- In office 1912–1913
- Preceded by: William Plummer Jr.
- Succeeded by: Isaac S. Smick

Personal details
- Born: John Warren Davis; March 4, 1867 Elizabeth City, North Carolina
- Died: February 21, 1945 (aged 77) Norfolk, Virginia
- Education: Bucknell University (BA); Crozer Theological Seminary (BD); University of Pennsylvania Law School (LLB)

John Warren Davis (March 4, 1867 – February 21, 1945), also known as J. Warren Davis, was an American attorney, Democratic Party politician, and jurist associated with President Woodrow Wilson. He served as a judge on the United States Court of Appeals for the Third Circuit from 1920 until 1941, taking senior status in 1939 amid allegations that he had been bribed by film producer William Fox. Davis and Fox were tried twice in federal court, each trial ending in a hung jury.

Davis entered politics upon his 1910 election to the New Jersey Senate from Salem County, on a Democratic Party ticket headed by Wilson as the nominee for governor of New Jersey. After Wilson was elected president of the United States in 1912, he appointed Davis as United States Attorney for the District of New Jersey. In 1916, Wilson appointed Davis as a United States district judge on the Court for the District of New Jersey, and Wilson elevated him to the Third Circuit in 1920, during his final year as president.

== Early life and education ==
John Warren Davis was born on March 4, 1867 in Elizabeth City, North Carolina to John S. and Emma B. (née Sawyer) Davis.

He lived near Norfolk, Virginia with his family until 1889, when he enrolled at Chester Academy in Pennsylvania to prepare for college. He graduated from Bucknell University in 1896 with a Bachelor of Arts and Crozer Theological Seminary in 1899. After graduating from Crozer, he taught Hebrew and Greek there for three years.

From 1900 to 1902, he studied history and philosophy at the University of Chicago and the Leipzig University. He also attended lectures at Berlin, Halle, and Göttingen. He returned to the United States, where he became a resident of Salem County, New Jersey in 1903 and graduated from the University of Pennsylvania Law School in 1906.

== Legal practice ==
After graduating from law school, Davis joined his brother James M. Davis as attorneys in the Philadelphia law office of A. S. Ashbridge Jr. Both brothers were promoted to partner, but in time, the brothers dissolved the partnership and relocated across the Delaware River to Camden, New Jersey.

== New Jersey Senate ==
In 1910, Davis was elected to the New Jersey Senate as a member of the Democratic Party. While in the Senate, he was a support of Governor Woodrow Wilson and ushered many of Wilson's proposed reforms through the legislature. He was elevated to Senate majority leader in 1913.

== United States Attorney ==
After Wilson was elected president of the United States in 1912, he appointed Davis as United States Attorney for the District of New Jersey. At the time, New Jersey was the preferred state of legal incorporation for many national corporations, meaning that his office had jurisdiction over many nationally significant cases and was one of the most powerful within the United States Department of Justice.

As the top federal prosecutor in the state, Davis secured a $200,000 fine against the Central Railroad of New Jersey for violations of rebate laws, which was the largest ever paid at that time for railroad rebates. He also secured a $100,000 fine against the Lehigh Coal and Navigation Company for solicit and accepting rebates. He also prosecuted sixteen burglars (known as "yeggmen") for robberies of federal post offices in a single year.

== Federal judicial service ==
=== District Court for the District of New Jersey ===
On May 6, 1916, Wilson nominated Davis to the United States District Court for the District of New Jersey, to a new seat authorized by 39 Stat. 48. He was confirmed by the United States Senate on May 15, 1916, and received his commission the same day. His service terminated on June 12, 1920, due to his elevation to the Third Circuit.

=== Court of Appeals for the Third Circuit ===
Davis was nominated by President Wilson on May 28, 1920, to a seat on the United States Court of Appeals for the Third Circuit vacated by Judge Thomas Griffith Haight. He was confirmed by the Senate on June 2, 1920, and received his commission the same day. He was a member of the Conference of Senior Circuit Judges (now the Judicial Conference of the United States) in 1938. He assumed senior status on April 15, 1939, in response to the Fox scandal, and was inactive during his entire period of senior service. His service terminated on November 24, 1941, due to his resignation, thus relinquishing his lifetime salary to which he would otherwise have been entitled.

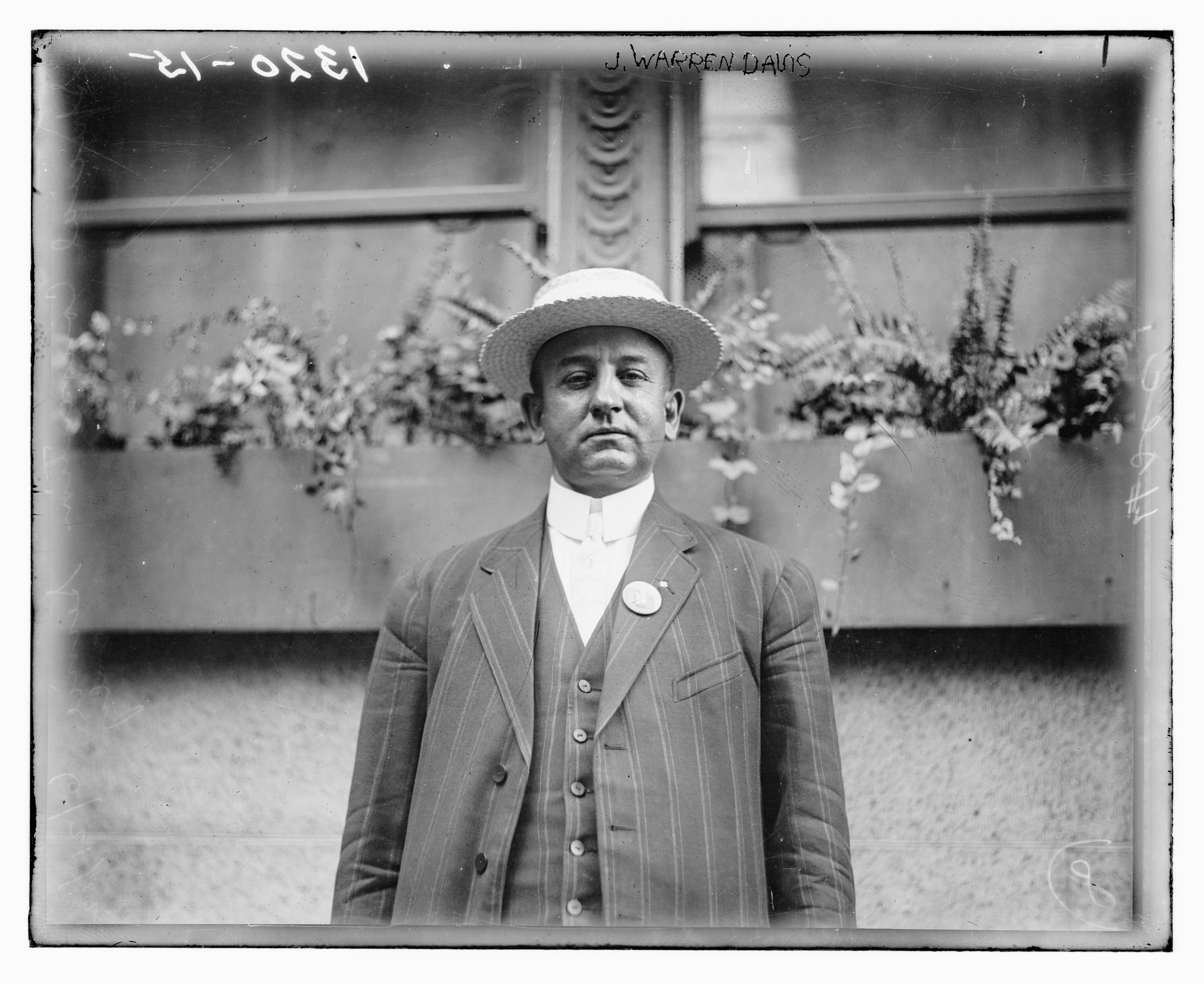
Davis wearing a Woodrow Wilson campaign

==== Scandal, indictment and resignation ====
In March 1939, Davis was indicted by a federal grand jury on charges of conspiracy to obstruct justice and defraud the United States, stemming from an allegation that he was bribed by the famous film producer William Fox. Fox pleaded guilty on March 28, 1939, prompting Davis to step down from the bench two weeks thereafter. Davis and a co-conspirator were tried twice by United States Attorney Francis Biddle, each trial resulting in a hung jury.

== Personal life and death ==
Davis married Marguerite Noble Gay in Salem, New Jersey on June 14, 1913, just two days after receiving his commission as United States Attorney. They had two sons. J. Warren Davis Jr. was born on July 30, 1918. A daughter, Mary Seagrave, was born on November 15, 1915 and died in childbirth in 1943.

In the late 1930s, Davis served as the chairman of the Board of Trustees of his alma mater Bucknell. The Davis Gymnasium there was named in his honour. During his final years, Davis resided on his farm in Princess Anne County, Virginia.

Davis died on February 21, 1945.

== Sources ==
Legal offices
Preceded by Seat established by 39 Stat. 48	Judge of the United States District Court for the District of New Jersey; 1916–1920	Succeeded by Joseph Lamb Bodine
Preceded by Thomas Griffith Haight	Judge of the United States Court of Appeals for the Third Circuit; 1920–1939	Succeeded by Charles Alvin Jones
