= Senator Vreeland =

Senator Vreeland may refer to:

- James P. Vreeland (1910–2001, New Jersey State Senate
- John Beam Vreeland (1852–1923), New Jersey State Senate
