= Governor Gates =

Governor Gates may refer to:

- Charles W. Gates (1856–1927), 55th Governor of Vermont
- Ralph F. Gates (1893–1978), 37th Governor of Indiana
- Thomas Gates (governor) (1585–1622), Colonial Governor of Virginia in 1610 and 1611 to 1614
