= 1914 Vermont gubernatorial election =

- November 3, 1914
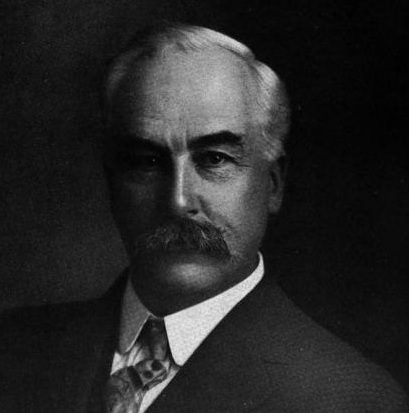

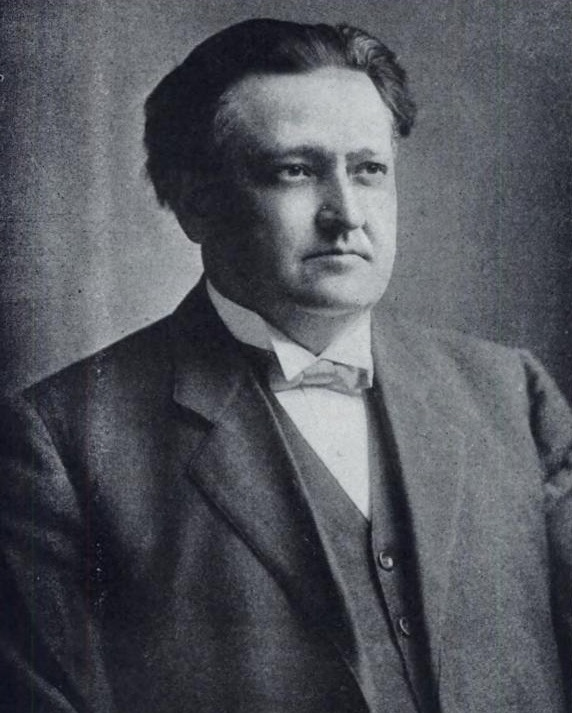

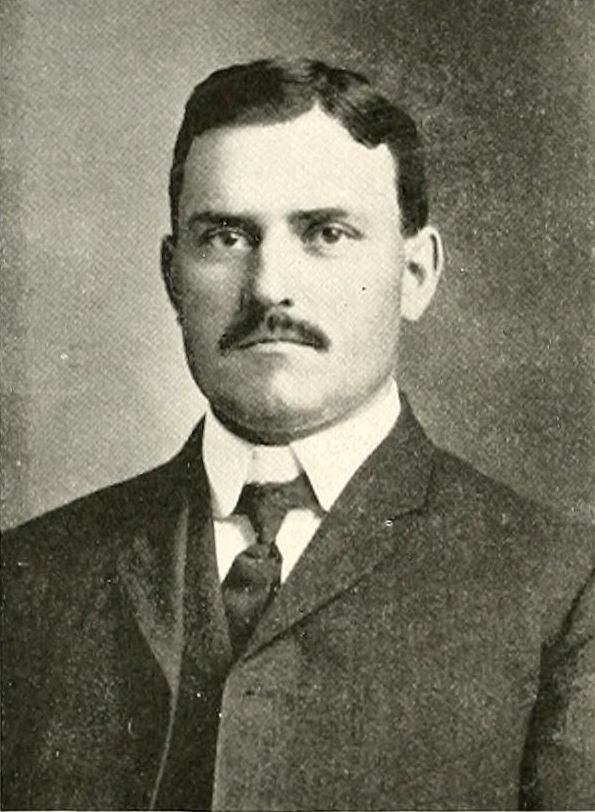
| Nominee | Charles W. Gates | Harland B. Howe | Walter J. Aldrich |
| Party | Republican | Democratic | Progressive |
| Popular vote | 36,972 | 16,191 | 6,929 |
| Percentage | 59.54% | 26.08% | 11.16% |
- Gates: 30–40% 40–50% 50–60% 60–70% 70–80% 80–90% 90-100% Howe: 40–50% 50–60% 60–70% No Vote/Data
Governor before election
Allen M. Fletcher
Republican
Elected Governor
Charles W. Gates
Republican

The 1914 Vermont gubernatorial election took place on November 3, 1914. Incumbent Republican Allen M. Fletcher, per the "Mountain Rule", did not run for re-election to a second term as Governor of Vermont. Republican candidate Charles W. Gates defeated Democratic candidate Harland B. Howe and Progressive candidate Walter J. Aldrich to succeed him.

== Results ==
1914 Vermont gubernatorial election
| Party | Candidate | Votes | % | ±% |
|---|---|---|---|---|
| Republican | Charles W. Gates | 36,972 | 59.54 | |
| Democratic | Harland B. Howe | 16,191 | 26.08 | |
| Progressive | Walter J. Aldrich | 6,929 | 11.16 | |
| Prohibition | Clement F. Smith | 1,074 | 1.73 | |
| Socialist | William R. Rowland | 899 | 1.45 | |
| N/A | Other | 27 | 0.04 | |
| Total votes | | 62,092 | 100.0 | |
