= Edmund W. Wakelee =

American politician (1869-1945)

Edmund Waring Wakelee (November 21, 1869 – April 26, 1945) was an American lawyer, politician, and utility executive from New Jersey. He served on the New Jersey General Assembly.

== Life ==
Wakelee was born on November 21, 1869, in Kingston, New York, the son of Nicholas Wakelee and Eliza Christian Ingersoll.

Wakelee attended the Kingston Academy and the New York University, graduating from the latter in 1891. He studied law in the office of Bernard & Fiero, who practiced in Kingston at the time but later moved to Albany. He was admitted to the New York bar in 1891, after which he was appointed to the law department of the New York Custom House and resided in New York City. Shortly afterwards, he moved to Demarest, New Jersey. He was admitted to the New Jersey bar as an attorney in 1896, and then as a counselor in 1900. He then organized and headed the law firm Wakelee, Thornall & Wright, with law offices in New York City, Englewood, and Hackensack.

In 1898, Wakelee was elected to the New Jersey General Assembly as a Republican, serving as one of two representatives from Bergen County. He served in the Assembly in 1899 and 1900. He was Assembly Majority Leader in the latter year. In 1900, he was elected to the New Jersey Senate as a Republican, representing Bergen County. He was elected to fill a vacancy caused by his predecessor William M. Johnson resigning to became First Assistant Postmaster-General of the United States, and at the time of his election he was the youngest member of the Senate. He served in the Senate in 1901, 1902, 1903, 1904, 1905, 1906, 1907, 1908, 1909, and 1910. He served as Senate Majority Leader and President of the Senate, and while serving in the latter position he was Acting Governor on several occasions while Governor Franklin Murphy was away in Europe and other places. He was chairman of the New Jersey Republican State Committee from 1912 to 1915. He was a delegate to the 1940 Republican National Convention.

While in the Senate, Wakelee drafted a number of important laws, was consulted on legislation matters, fought for the preservation of the Palisades, secured the enactment of legislation that resulted in the establishment of the Palisades Interstate Park, and supported the plan to build to bridge or tunnel the Hudson River. Long interested in Bergen County, he secured its first State road, participated in the organization of the New Jersey and Hudson River Railway and Ferry Company (which operated street railway lines from Edgewater to Newark, Paterson, and Englewood) and the Riverside and Fort Lee Ferry Company (which operated a ferry from New York City to Edgewater), and was general counsel for the companies. He was also a founder, vice-president, counsel, and director of the Palisades Trust and Guarantee Company, founder of the Rockland Electric Company of Bergen County, founder and a director of the Registrar and Transfer Company of New Jersey and New York, and a director of the Sedgewick Machine Works of New York City, the Closter National Bank, and the North Jersey Title Insurance Company of Hackensack.

Wakelee left the law firm Wakelee, Thornall & Wright in 1914. He specialized in utility field since the beginning of his law practice. He was regularly retained by the Public Service Corporation of New Jersey since it was founded in 1903 and entered its legal department in 1911. In 1914, he was appointed its associate general solicitor. From 1917 to 1939, he was the corporation's vice-president, director, and executive committee member. In 1939, he became its president. As head of the legal department, he handled and directed the handling of important legal problems the large organization had to deal with and fostered public relations. When the New York and New Jersey state commissions that managed the Palisades public park were merged to form the Palisades Interstate Park Commission in 1937, he was selected its vice-president. In 1939, he became the commission's president.

Wakelee became a member of Delta Upsilon and Phi Delta Phi while attending New York University. He later became a member of the Freemasons, the Elks, the Royal Arcanum, the Knights of Honor, the American Bar Association, the New Jersey State Bar Association, the Bergen County Bar Association, the New York County Lawyers' Association, the Edison Electric Institute, the American Gas Association, the American Transit Association, the New Jersey Historical Society, the Bergen County Historical Society, the National Association of Motor Bus Operators (which he was also vice president and director of), multiple branches of the Chamber of Commerce (serving as board chairman of the Bergen County branch), the Junior Order of United American Mechanics, the Metropolitan Club and the Lotos Club. He was also president of the Demarest Firemen's Association, a life member of the New Jersey State Firemen's Association, a member of the New York Athletic Club the Scottish Rite, and the Bergen County Sinking Fund Commission, and a trustee of the Newark Safety Council and the Englewood Cemetery Association. He was a Presbyterian. He was unmarried.

Wakelee died at home on April 26, 1945. A thousand people attended his funeral, including Governor Walter E. Edge, Attorney General Walter D. Van Riper, Senator David Van Alstyne Jr., Assembly Majority Leader Walter Jones, former U.S. Senator David Baird Jr., Public Service Corporation chairman Thomas N. McCarter, Wakelee's successor as president of the Public Service Corporation George H. Blake, all the Public Service Corporation's vice-presidents, 200 employees from the corporation, and President Douglas W. Morgan, the entire staff of officers, and many employees from the Palisades Trust and Guarantee Company of Englewood. He was buried in Brookside Cemetery.

Political offices
Preceded by Elijah C. Hutchinson	President of the New Jersey Senate; 1904	Succeeded by Joseph Cross
