= Joseph Cross (judge) =

American judge (1843–1913)

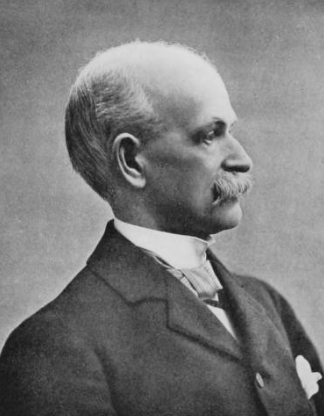

Judge of the United States District Court for the District of New Jersey
- In office March 17, 1905 – October 29, 1913
- Appointed by: Theodore Roosevelt
- Preceded by: Seat established by 33 Stat. 987
- Succeeded by: Thomas Griffith Haight

Personal details
- Born: December 29, 1843 Morristown, New Jersey, US
- Died: October 29, 1913 (aged 69) Elizabeth, New Jersey, US
- Spouse: Mary P. Whiting (m. 1870)
- Education: Princeton University (A.B., A.M.); Columbia Law School read law

Joseph Cross (December 29, 1843 – October 29, 1913) was a New Jersey politician and United States district judge of the United States District Court for the District of New Jersey.

== Education and career ==
Born near Morristown, New Jersey, Cross attended the College of New Jersey (now Princeton University), receiving an Artium Baccalaureus degree in 1865 and an Artium Magister degree in 1868. He attended Columbia Law School, but read law to enter the profession. He had a private practice in Elizabeth, New Jersey from 1869 to 1905. During that period, he was also a Judge of the state District Court of Elizabeth from 1888 to 1891, and a member of the New Jersey General Assembly from 1893 to 1895, serving as its Speaker in 1895, and as a member of the New Jersey Senate from 1899 to 1905, serving as President of the Senate in 1905.

== Federal judicial service ==
On March 13, 1905, Cross was nominated by President Theodore Roosevelt to a new seat on the United States District Court for the District of New Jersey created by 33 Stat. 987. Cross was confirmed by the United States Senate on March 17, 1905, and received his commission that day. He served on the court until his death.

== Personal life ==
Cross married Mary P. Whiting on October 19, 1870.

He died at his home in Elizabeth on October 29, 1913, after a long illness.

== Sources ==
Political offices
Preceded by John I. Holt	Speaker of the New Jersey General Assembly; 1895–1896	Succeeded by Louis T. DeRousse
Preceded by Edmund W. Wakelee	President of the New Jersey Senate; 1905	Succeeded by William J. Bradley
Legal offices
Preceded by Seat established by 33 Stat. 987	Judge of the United States District Court for the District of New Jersey; 1905–1913	Succeeded by Thomas Griffith Haight
