= Fraser Metzger =

American pastor and politician (1872–1954)

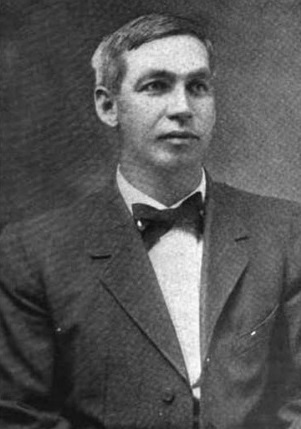
- Metzger in 1914

Member of the Vermont House of Representatives
- In office 1917–1919
- Preceded by: Alfred C. Wells
- Succeeded by: Charles J. Stockwell
- Constituency: Randolph

Personal details
- Born: October 25, 1872 Gloversville, New York, US
- Died: May 29, 1954 (aged 81) South Windsor, Connecticut, US
- Resting place: Center Cemetery, South Windsor, Connecticut, US
- Spouse: Jessie Amy Lacy (m. 1902–1954)
- Children: 3
- Education: Defiance College; Union College
- Occupation: Pastor, politician, academic dean

Military service
- Service: United States Army
- Years of service: 1918
- Rank: Private
- Unit: Officer Candidate School, Camp Zachary Taylor
- Wars: World War I

Fraser Metzger (October 25, 1872 – May 29, 1954) was a pastor, politician, and academic who lived primarily in Vermont and New Jersey. He is known for his Progressive Party candidacy for governor of Vermont in 1912.

A native of Gloversville, New York, Metzger was raised and educated in St. Johnsville. He received his bachelor's degree in divinity from Christian Bible Institute (now Defiance College) in 1895 and was ordained as a minister in the Christian Connection church. He pastored churches in Maine, New York, and Vermont, and graduated from Union College in 1902. He was then assigned as full-time pastor of the Christian Connection church in Randolph, Vermont, where he served for the next 20 years.

Metzger was active in politics as a Republican; he supported Theodore Roosevelt for president in 1912. When Roosevelt lost the party nomination to incumbent William Howard Taft and ran as the candidate of the Bull Moose Party (Progressive Party), Metzger accepted the Bull Moose nomination for governor. Beginning in the 1850s, Republicans won every statewide election in Vermont for more than 100 years. In the 1912 contest for governor, Metzger's strong third place showing prevented the two major candidates, Republican Allen M. Fletcher and Democrat Harland Bradley Howe from gaining a majority; the Vermont legislature was required to choose, and Fletcher won the contest in the Vermont General Assembly.

In 1916, Metzger was elected to the Vermont House of Representatives as a Republican, and he represented Randolph for one term. During World War I, Metzger served as Vermont's federal food administrator in 1917 and joined the United States Army in 1918. He was discharged at the end of the war and returned to his church in Randolph.

In 1923, Metzger left Vermont to become chaplain at Pennsylvania State College. In 1925, he moved to Rutgers University to serve as dean of men and chaplain. He remained at Rutgers as dean until 1944 and chaplain until 1945. After retiring from the university, Metzger was appointed pastor of the First Congregational Church in South Windsor, Connecticut. He died in South Windsor on May 29, 1954 and was buried at South Windsor's Center Cemetery.

== Early life and education ==
Fraser Metzger was born in Gloversville, New York on October 25, 1872, a son of Albert Henry Metzger and Catherine (Lenz) Metzger. He was raised and educated in St. Johnsville, New York, and decided on a career in the ministry. His family was not pleased that he chose scholarship instead of taking over the family hardware business, so they did not help with his education, which he largely funded himself.

Metzger attended the Christian Connection's Christian Bible Institute in Stanfordville, New York (now Defiance College), from which he earned a Bachelor of Divinity degree in 1895. He was ordained as a Christian Connection minister and preached in Freehold and nearby communities. In 1898, Metzger became pastor of the North Church in Eastport, Maine. In 1900, he became pastor of Albany, New York's First Christian Church.

== Early career ==
Metzger was elected Phi Beta Kappa in 1902 when he graduated from Union College with a Bachelor of Arts degree. He married Jessie Lacy on June 12, 1902 and they had three children, Albert, Roscoe, and Karl.

After part time preaching in Vermont while attending Union College, his full time career began in 1902 when he became pastor of the Christian Church of Randolph, Vermont. Metzger oversaw the merging of the Christian and Congregational Churches into Bethany Church in 1905, part of the larger effort to combine the two denominations into the Congregational Christian Churches. Metzger was reform oriented and worked for improved working conditions for women and children, farm modernization, and educational improvement through the Interchurch Federation of Vermont. In 1921 he received the honorary degree of Doctor of Divinity from Middlebury College. In 1935, Union College awarded him an honorary L.H.D.

Metzger attended the Republican Second Congressional District Nominating Convention in April 1912 as a supporter of Theodore Roosevelt for president. After the split between supporters of Roosevelt and incumbent William Howard Taft led to creation of the Progressive Party, Metzger accepted the new party's nomination for Governor. In the general election, he faced the two major party candidates, Republican Allen M. Fletcher and Democrat Harland B. Howe. He lost but received 24.1% of the vote; since none of the candidates received a majority, the election went to the legislature, which chose Fletcher. (Note: The 1912 election was just the second since 1853 that was decided by the Vermont General Assembly. For more than 100 years from the founding of the party in the mid-1850s, Republicans won every statewide election in Vermont, almost always by substantial majorities.)

== Later career ==
Metzger ran for the United States House of Representatives as a Progressive in 1914 and lost to Porter Dale. In 1916, Metzger was elected to the Vermont House of Representatives as a Republican, and he served one term, January 1917 to January 1919. He held the position of state food administrator for Vermont in 1917, at the start of World War I. After the war started, he was assessed by the Bureau of Investigation as a possible German spy, likely because of his progressive political activism and German/Jewish surname. According to contemporary accounts, Vermont's chief executive visited the bureau and asked to review its investigative file on Metzger; after reading through the material, he wrote on the last page "This is a damned lie," and signed it "Horace F. Graham, Governor of Vermont."

Despite being over 40 years old and eligible for a draft deferment, Metzger joined the United States Army during the war; in October 1918, his application for training as a Field Artillery officer was accepted and he was assigned to the Officer Candidate School at Camp Zachary Taylor, Kentucky. The Armistice of November 11, 1918 ended the war before his training and assignment to the 5th Observation Battery were complete, and Metzger was discharged in December.

He left Bethany Church in 1923 to become chaplain at Pennsylvania State College and left there after two years, following President John M. Thomas to Rutgers University, where Metzger became dean of men and acting chaplain. He was the first full-time dean in the history of Rutgers and instituted the first comprehensive student-life program in Rutgers history. He retired as dean in 1944 and as chaplain in 1945. From 1945 until his death, he was pastor of the First Congregational Church in South Windsor, Connecticut.

== Death and legacy ==
Metzger died in South Windsor, Connecticut on May 29, 1954. He was buried at Center Cemetery in South Windsor. His papers are held by the University of Vermont and Rutgers.
