= 1912 Vermont gubernatorial election =

- September 3, 1912
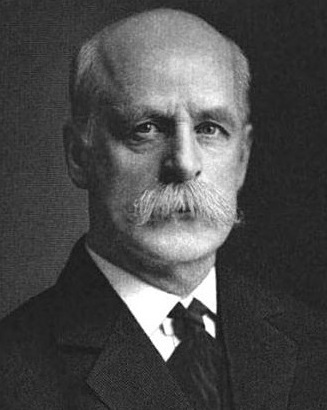

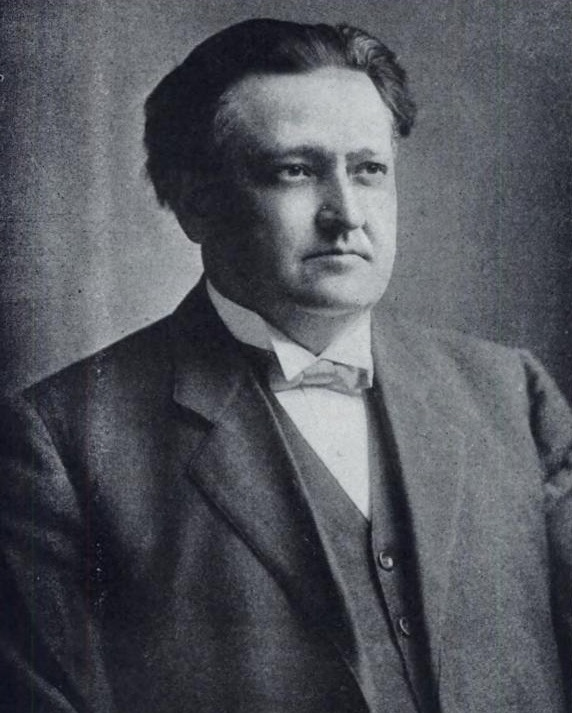

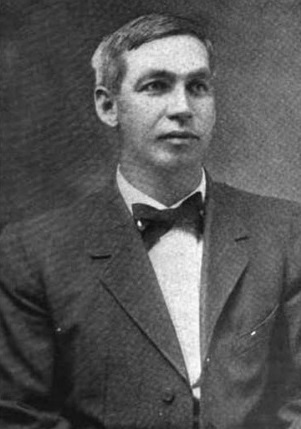
Candidate	Allen M. Fletcher	Harland B. Howe	Fraser Metzger
Party	Republican	Democratic	Progressive
Electoral vote	163	76	32
Popular vote	26,237	20,001	15,629
Percentage	40.46%	30.85%	24.10%
- Fletcher: 30–40% 40–50% 50–60% 60–70% 70–80% 80–90% Howe: 20–30% 30–40% 40–50% 50–60% 60–70% 70–80% Metzger: 30–40% 40–50% 50–60% Tie: 30-40% No Vote/Data
Governor before election
John A. Mead
Republican
Elected Governor
Allen M. Fletcher
Republican

The 1912 Vermont gubernatorial election took place on September 3, 1912. Incumbent Republican John A. Mead, per the "Mountain Rule", did not run for re-election to a second term as Governor of Vermont. Republican candidate Allen M. Fletcher defeated Democratic candidate Harland B. Howe and Progressive candidate Fraser Metzger to succeed him. Since no candidate won a majority of the popular vote, the election was decided by the Vermont General Assembly in accordance with the state constitution, where Fletcher was elected with 163 votes to 76 for Howe and 32 for Metzger.

This was the last time until 1986 that none of the gubernatorial candidates received a majority of the vote.

== Results ==
1912 Vermont gubernatorial election
Party	Candidate	Votes	%	±%
Republican	Allen M. Fletcher	26,237	40.46	
Democratic	Harland B. Howe	20,001	30.85	
Progressive	Fraser Metzger	15,629	24.10	
Prohibition	Clement F. Smith	1,735	2.68	
Socialist	Fred W. Suitor	1,210	1.87	
N/A	Other	27	0.04	
Total votes		64,839	100.0	

== Works cited ==
- Doyle, William (1992). The Vermont Political Tradition: And Those Who Helped Make It. ISBN 0961548614.
