= Thomas Griffith Haight =

American judge (1879–1942)

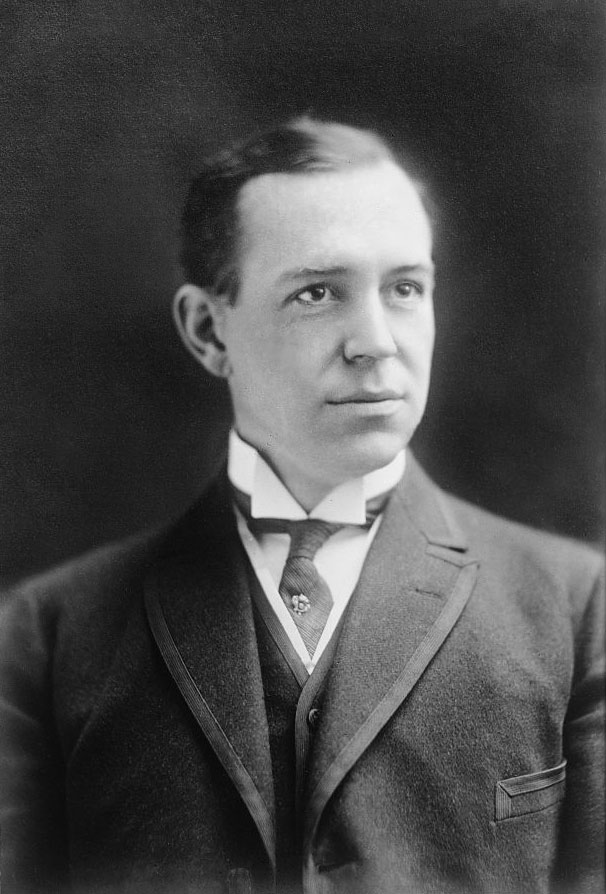
- Official portrait, c. 1910–1915

Judge of the United States Court of Appeals for the Third Circuit
- In office April 1, 1919 – May 31, 1920
- Appointed by: Woodrow Wilson
- Preceded by: John Bayard McPherson
- Succeeded by: John Warren Davis

Judge of the United States District Court for the District of New Jersey
- In office February 18, 1914 – April 1, 1919
- Appointed by: Woodrow Wilson
- Preceded by: Joseph Cross
- Succeeded by: Charles Francis Lynch

Personal details
- Born: Thomas Griffith Haight; August 4, 1879 Freehold Borough, New Jersey, U.S.
- Died: January 26, 1942 (aged 62)
- Relations: Charles Haight (uncle)
- Education: Princeton University; New York Law School (LLB)

Thomas Griffith Haight Sr. (August 4, 1879 – January 26, 1942) was an American circuit judge who served on the United States Court of Appeals for the Third Circuit and earlier on the United States District Court for the District of New Jersey.

== Early life ==
Born on August 4, 1879, in Freehold Borough, New Jersey, Haight attended Princeton University and earned a Bachelor of Laws in 1900 from New York Law School.

== Career ==
=== Early career ===
He entered private practice in Jersey City, New Jersey, from 1901 to 1913. He was city attorney for Jersey City from 1911 to 1913. He was corporation counsel for Hudson County from 1913 to 1914.

=== Federal judicial service ===
Haight was nominated by President Woodrow Wilson on February 3, 1914, to a seat on the United States District Court for the District of New Jersey vacated by Judge Joseph Cross. He was confirmed by the United States Senate on February 18, 1914, and received his commission the same day. His service terminated on April 1, 1919, due to his elevation to the Third Circuit.

Haight received a recess appointment from President Wilson on April 1, 1919, to a seat on the United States Court of Appeals for the Third Circuit vacated by Judge John Bayard McPherson. He was nominated to the same position by President Wilson on May 23, 1919. He was confirmed by the Senate on June 24, 1919, and received his commission the same day. His service terminated on May 31, 1920, due to his resignation.

=== Later career ===
Following his resignation from the federal bench, Haight returned to private practice in Jersey City from 1920 to 1942.

== Personal life and death ==
Haight was the nephew of General Charles Haight. He died on January 26, 1942.

== Sources ==
Legal offices
Preceded by Joseph Cross	Judge of the United States District Court for the District of New Jersey; 1914–1919	Succeeded by Charles Francis Lynch
Preceded by John Bayard McPherson	Judge of the United States Court of Appeals for the Third Circuit; 1919–1920	Succeeded by John Warren Davis
