= List of federal judges appointed by Woodrow Wilson =

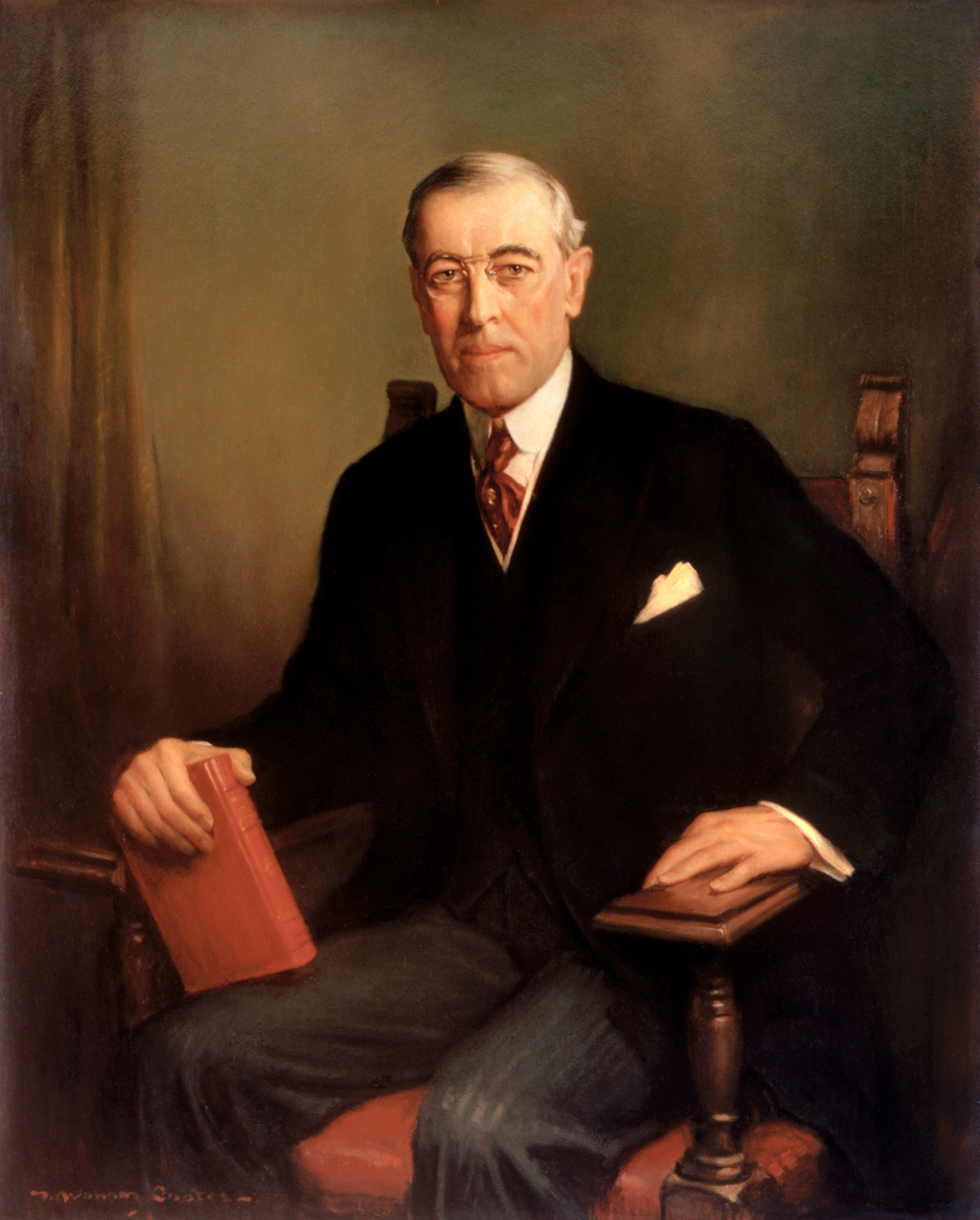
Woodrow Wilson.

Following is a list of all Article III United States federal judges appointed by President Woodrow Wilson during his presidency. In total Wilson appointed 76 Article III federal judges, including 3 Justices to the Supreme Court of the United States, 20 judges to the United States Courts of Appeals, and 53 judges to the United States district courts.

Wilson made additional appointments to Article I tribunals. He made 4 appointments to the United States Court of Customs Appeals. He also made 4 appointments to the Board of General Appraisers, the forerunner of the United States Customs Court and later the United States Court of International Trade.

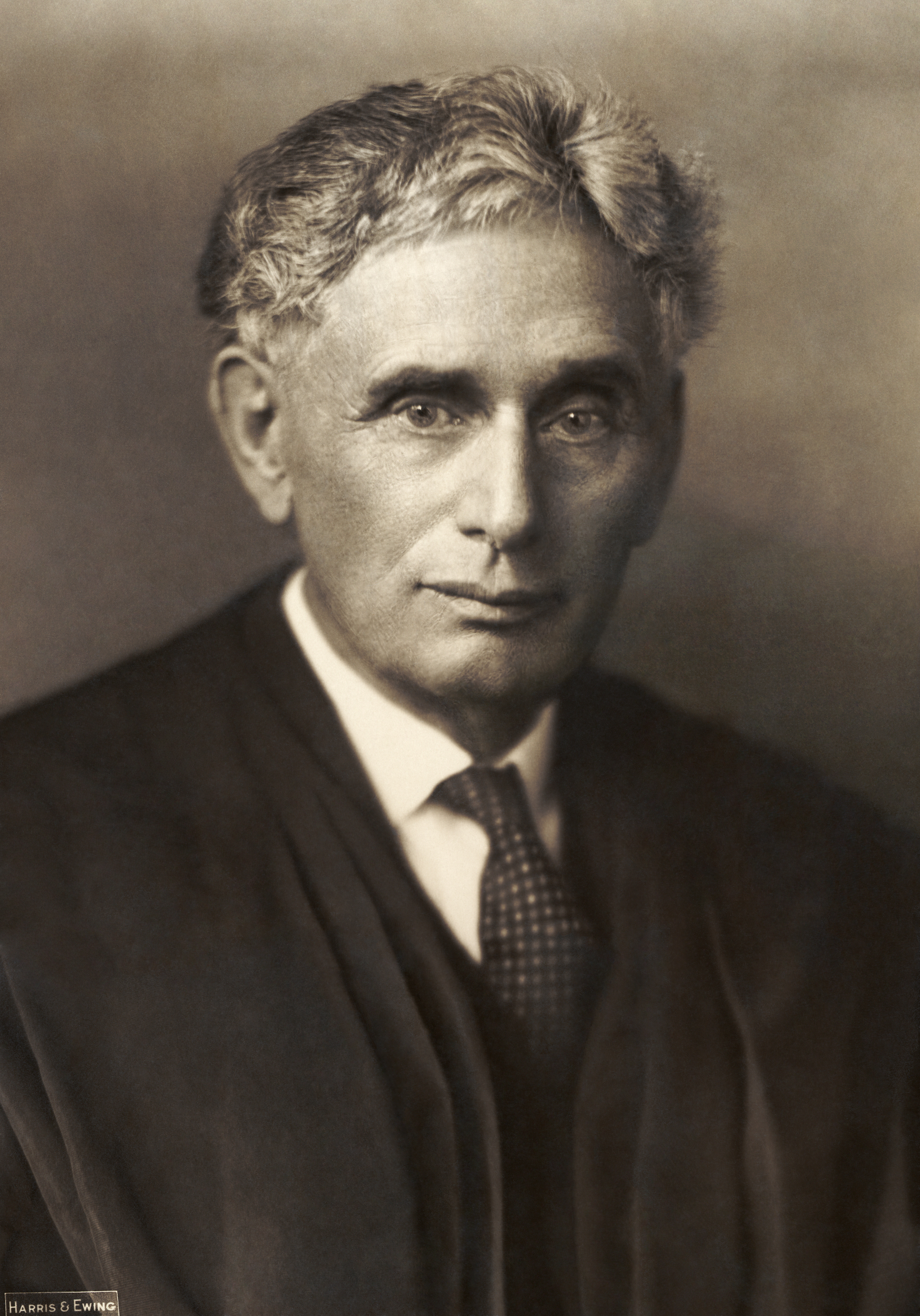
Wilson appointed Louis Brandeis, the first Jewish Supreme Court justice.

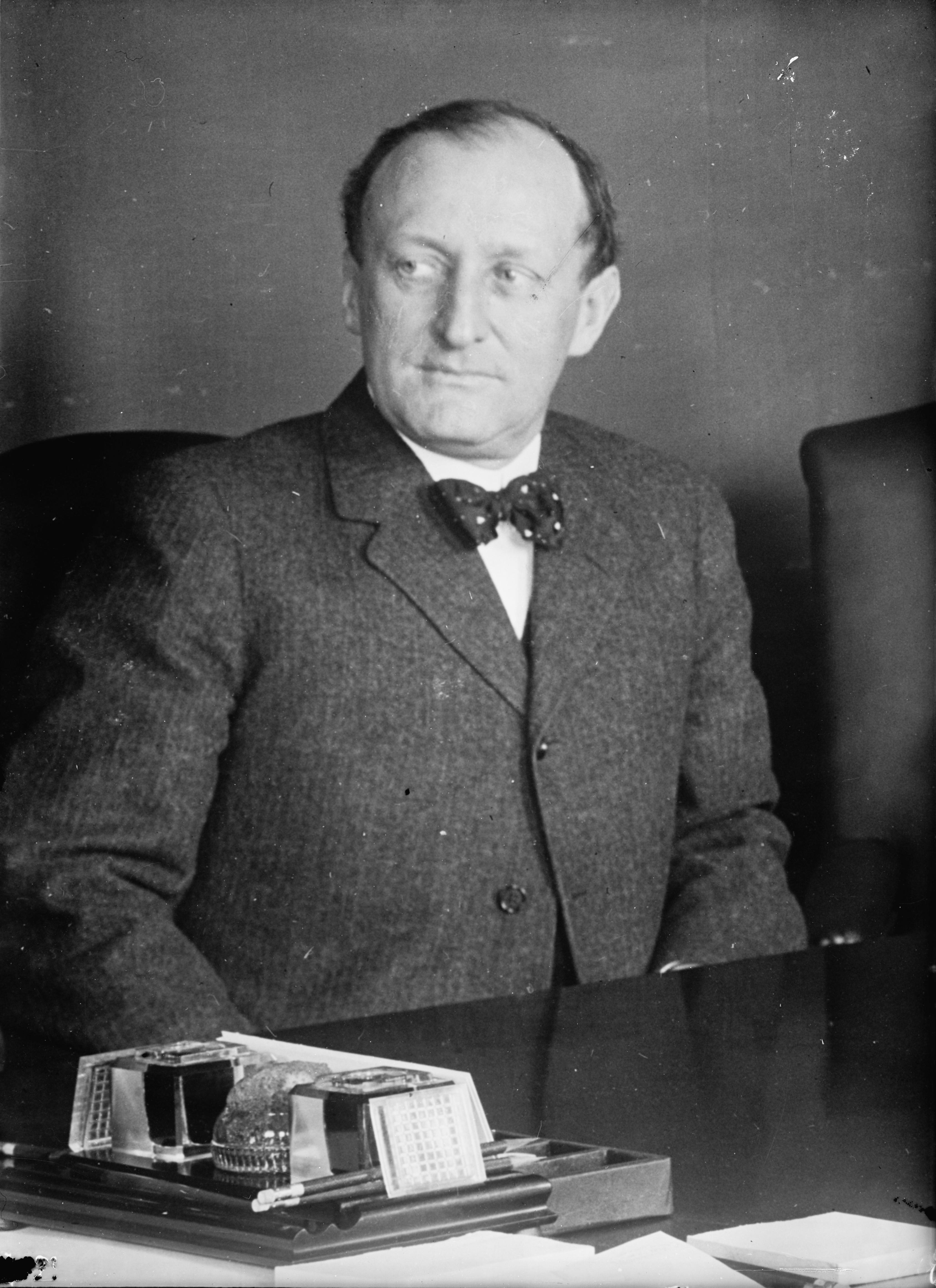
James Clark McReynolds was Wilson's first and longest-serving Supreme Court appointment.

== United States Supreme Court justices ==
#	Justice	Seat	State	Former justice	Nomination date	Confirmation date	Began active service	Ended active service	Ended retired service
1	James Clark McReynolds	3	Tennessee	Horace Harmon Lurton	August 19, 1914	August 29, 1914	August 29, 1914	January 31, 1941	August 24, 1946
2	Louis Brandeis	4	Massachusetts	Joseph Rucker Lamar	January 28, 1916	June 1, 1916	June 1, 1916	February 13, 1939	October 5, 1941
3	John Hessin Clarke	6	Ohio	Charles Evans Hughes	July 14, 1916	July 24, 1916	July 24, 1916	September 18, 1922	–

== Courts of appeals ==
#	Judge	Circuit	Nomination date	Confirmation date	Began active service	Ended active service	Ended senior status
1	George Hutchins Bingham	First	May 15, 1913	June 5, 1913	June 5, 1913	March 23, 1939	September 25, 1949
2	Charles Albert Woods	Fourth	April 24, 1913	June 5, 1913	June 5, 1913	June 21, 1925	–
3	Henry Wade Rogers	Second	September 18, 1913	September 29, 1913	September 29, 1913	August 16, 1926	–
4	Victor Baynard Woolley	Third	August 7, 1914	August 12, 1914	August 12, 1914	May 1, 1938	February 22, 1945
5	Richard Wilde Walker Jr.	Fifth	October 2, 1914	October 5, 1914	October 5, 1914	September 1, 1930	April 10, 1936
6	Samuel Alschuler	Seventh	January 7, 1916	January 18, 1916	August 16, 1915	May 15, 1936	November 9, 1939
7	Evan Alfred Evans	Seventh	May 1, 1916	May 10, 1916	May 10, 1916	July 7, 1948	–
8	Charles Merrill Hough	Second	August 15, 1916	August 21, 1916	August 21, 1916	April 22, 1927	–
9	Kimbrough Stone	Eighth	December 19, 1916	December 21, 1916	December 21, 1916	May 15, 1947	February 27, 1958
10	R. L. Batts	Fifth	January 17, 1917	February 5, 1917	February 5, 1917	August 22, 1919	–
11	Constantine Joseph Smyth	D.C.	June 29, 1917	July 12, 1917	July 12, 1917	April 14, 1924	–
12	Charles F. Johnson	First	October 1, 1917	October 1, 1917	October 1, 1917	April 30, 1929	February 15, 1930
13	Martin Thomas Manton	Second	March 12, 1918	March 18, 1918	March 18, 1918	February 7, 1939	–
14	George W. Anderson	First	October 1, 1918	October 24, 1918	October 24, 1918	September 30, 1931	February 14, 1938
15	George True Page	Seventh	March 1, 1919	March 1, 1919	March 1, 1919	October 1, 1930	November 4, 1941
16	Thomas Griffith Haight	Third	March 1, 1919 (Note: Renominated on May 23, 1919.)	June 24, 1919	April 1, 1919	May 31, 1920	–
17	Maurice H. Donahue	Sixth	October 1, 1919	October 29, 1919	October 29, 1919	September 10, 1928	–
18	Nathan Philemon Bryan	Fifth	April 23, 1920	April 23, 1920	April 23, 1920	August 8, 1935	–
19	Alexander Campbell King	Fifth	April 29, 1920	May 24, 1920	May 24, 1920	December 31, 1924	–
20	John Warren Davis	Third	May 28, 1920	June 2, 1920	June 2, 1920	April 15, 1939	November 24, 1941

== District courts ==
#	Judge	Court (Note: See List of United States district and territorial courts)	Nomination date	Confirmation date	Began active service	Ended active service	Ended senior status
1	Jeremiah Neterer	W.D. Wash.	July 2, 1913	July 21, 1913	March 4, 1913	May 31, 1933	February 2, 1943
2	Rhydon Mays Call	S.D. Fla.	April 12, 1913	April 24, 1913	March 26, 1913	December 15, 1927	–
3	Maurice Timothy Dooling	N.D. Cal.	July 18, 1913	July 28, 1913	July 28, 1913	November 4, 1924	–
4	William Henry Sawtelle	D. Ariz.	August 6, 1913	August 18, 1913	August 18, 1913	February 6, 1931	Elevated
5	Edwin Stark Thomas	D. Conn.	October 16, 1913	November 17, 1913	November 17, 1913	April 12, 1939	–
6	Thomas Griffith Haight	D.N.J.	February 3, 1914	February 18, 1914	February 18, 1914	April 1, 1919	Elevated
7	Oliver Booth Dickinson	E.D. Pa.	March 31, 1914	April 28, 1914	April 28, 1914	September 16, 1939	–
8	Henry De Lamar Clayton Jr.	M.D. Ala. N.D. Ala.	May 2, 1914	May 2, 1914	May 2, 1914	December 21, 1929	–
9	Wilbur F. Booth	D. Minn.	May 2, 1914	May 4, 1914	May 4, 1914	March 27, 1925	Elevated
10	J. Harry Covington	D.D.C.	June 8, 1914	June 15, 1914	June 15, 1914	May 31, 1918	–
11	John Hessin Clarke	N.D. Ohio	July 15, 1914	July 21, 1914	July 21, 1914	July 24, 1916	Elevated
12	W. H. Seward Thomson	W.D. Pa.	July 7, 1914	July 21, 1914	July 21, 1914	February 21, 1928	November 29, 1932
13	Augustus Noble Hand	S.D.N.Y.	September 28, 1914	September 30, 1914	September 30, 1914	June 1, 1927	Elevated
14	Walter I. McCoy	D.D.C.	September 29, 1914	October 2, 1914	October 2, 1914	May 22, 1918	Elevated
14.1	Walter I. McCoy	D.D.C.	May 16, 1918	May 22, 1918	May 22, 1918	December 8, 1929	–
15	Benjamin Franklin Bledsoe	S.D. Cal.	September 30, 1914	October 16, 1914	October 16, 1914	March 24, 1925	–
16	Frederick Lincoln Siddons	D.D.C.	October 21, 1914 (Note: Renominated on December 9, 1914.)	January 15, 1915	January 15, 1915	June 19, 1931	–
17	Harland Bradley Howe	D. Vt.	February 19, 1915	February 22, 1915	February 22, 1915	January 31, 1940	July 31, 1945
18	William Wallace Lambdin	S.D. Ga.	March 3, 1915	March 3, 1915	March 3, 1915	December 20, 1916	–
19	Oscar A. Trippet	S.D. Cal.	March 2, 1915	March 3, 1915	March 3, 1915	July 15, 1923	–
20	Martin Joseph Wade	S.D. Iowa	February 26, 1915	March 3, 1915	March 3, 1915	April 16, 1931	–
21	Tillman D. Johnson	D. Utah	January 7, 1916	January 18, 1916	November 2, 1915	May 28, 1949	November 1, 1953
22	Joseph T. Johnson	W.D.S.C.	January 4, 1916	January 24, 1916	March 9, 1915	May 8, 1919	–
23	Joseph William Woodrough	D. Neb.	March 13, 1916	March 31, 1916	April 3, 1916	April 12, 1933	Elevated
24	John Warren Davis	D.N.J.	May 6, 1916	May 15, 1916	May 15, 1916	June 12, 1920	Elevated
25	Martin Thomas Manton	S.D.N.Y.	August 15, 1916	August 23, 1916	August 23, 1916	March 22, 1918	Elevated
26	William Hitz	D.D.C.	December 15, 1916	January 2, 1917	November 15, 1916	February 13, 1931	Elevated
27	DuVal West	W.D. Tex.	December 19, 1916	December 21, 1916	December 21, 1916	November 30, 1931	May 13, 1949
28	Robert Tait Ervin	S.D. Ala.	January 16, 1917	January 23, 1917	January 23, 1917	January 23, 1935	October 24, 1949
29	Colin Neblett	D.N.M.	January 29, 1917	February 5, 1917	February 5, 1917	July 6, 1948	May 7, 1950
30	David C. Westenhaver	N.D. Ohio	February 19, 1917 (Note: Renominated on March 3, 1917.)	March 14, 1917	March 14, 1917	July 29, 1928	–
31	George W. Jack	W.D. La.	March 6, 1917	March 16, 1917	March 16, 1917	March 15, 1924	–
32	William Robert Smith	W.D. Tex.	April 11, 1917	April 12, 1917	April 12, 1917	August 16, 1924	–
33	Beverly Daniel Evans Jr.	S.D. Ga.	August 11, 1917	August 15, 1917	August 15, 1917	May 7, 1922	–
34	Edwin Louis Garvin	E.D.N.Y.	March 6, 1918	March 21, 1918	March 21, 1918	October 31, 1925	–
35	Joseph Chappell Hutcheson Jr.	S.D. Tex.	March 29, 1918	April 6, 1918	April 6, 1918	January 26, 1931	Elevated
36	John C. Knox	S.D.N.Y.	March 29, 1918	April 12, 1918	April 12, 1918	April 30, 1955	August 23, 1966
37	George W. English	E.D. Ill.	April 22, 1918	May 3, 1918	May 3, 1918	November 4, 1926	–
38	Jennings Bailey	D.D.C.	May 16, 1918	May 22, 1918	May 22, 1918	November 1, 1950	January 9, 1963
39	Louis FitzHenry	S.D. Ill.	July 6, 1918	July 6, 1918	July 6, 1918	October 3, 1933	Elevated
40	Edwin R. Holmes	N.D. Miss. S.D. Miss.	October 17, 1918	October 24, 1918	October 24, 1918	March 1, 1929; April 6, 1936	– Elevated
41	Robert L. Williams	E.D. Okla.	December 3, 1918	January 7, 1919	January 7, 1919	April 21, 1937	Elevated
42	Hugh M. Morris	D. Del.	January 17, 1919	January 27, 1919	January 27, 1919	June 30, 1930	–
43	James Clifton Wilson	N.D. Tex.	May 23, 1919	June 24, 1919	March 5, 1919	July 31, 1947	August 3, 1951
44	Charles Francis Lynch	D.N.J.	June 16, 1919	July 1, 1919	July 1, 1919	March 31, 1925	–
45	Henry Hitt Watkins	W.D.S.C.	July 14, 1919	July 22, 1919	July 22, 1919	December 31, 1936	September 8, 1947
46	Samuel Hale Sibley	N.D. Ga.	July 31, 1919	August 5, 1919	August 5, 1919	January 30, 1931	Elevated
47	Charles Breckenridge Faris	E.D. Mo.	October 11, 1919	October 13, 1919	October 13, 1919	February 6, 1935	Elevated
48	John Weld Peck	S.D. Ohio	October 30, 1919	November 5, 1919	November 5, 1919	April 3, 1923	–
49	Edwin Y. Webb	W.D.N.C.	October 30, 1919	November 5, 1919	November 5, 1919	March 1, 1948	February 7, 1955
50	William Lee Estes	E.D. Tex.	February 14, 1920	February 18, 1920	February 18, 1920	June 14, 1930	–
51	Joseph Lamb Bodine	D.N.J.	May 28, 1920	June 2, 1920	June 2, 1920	March 31, 1929	–
52	Frank Cooper	N.D.N.Y.	April 29, 1920	June 3, 1920	June 3, 1920	September 30, 1941	July 16, 1946

== Specialty courts (Article I) ==
=== United States Court of Claims ===
#	Judge	Nomination date	Confirmation date	Began active service	Ended active service	Ended senior status
1	Edward Kernan Campbell	May 1, 1913	May 22, 1913	May 22, 1913	April 22, 1928	December 7, 1938
2	George Eddy Downey	January 7, 1916	January 17, 1916	August 3, 1915	May 24, 1926	–
3	James Hay	July 15, 1916	July 17, 1916	July 17, 1916	November 30, 1927	June 12, 1931
4	Samuel Jordan Graham	July 10, 1919	July 28, 1919	July 28, 1919	May 1, 1930	January 20, 1951

=== Board of General Appraisers ===
#	Judge	Nomination date	Confirmation date	Began active service	Ended active service	Ended senior status
1	Jerry Bartholomew Sullivan	April 17, 1913	April 28, 1913	April 29, 1913	September 30, 1939	–
2	George Stewart Brown	October 16, 1913	November 13, 1913	November 14, 1913	August 31, 1941	–
3	William C. Adamson	September 20, 1917	September 20, 1917	September 24, 1917	January 20, 1928	–
4	George Emery Weller	December 3, 1918	January 3, 1919	January 6, 1919	September 30, 1930	–

== Notes ==
Renominations

== Sources ==
- Federal Judicial Center
