= Henry Hitt Watkins =

American judge

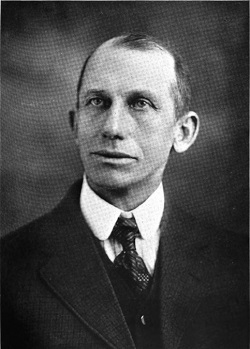

Senior Judge of the United States District Court for the Western District of South Carolina
- In office December 31, 1936 – September 8, 1947

Judge of the United States District Court for the Western District of South Carolina
- In office July 22, 1919 – December 31, 1936
- Appointed by: Woodrow Wilson
- Preceded by: Joseph T. Johnson
- Succeeded by: Charles Cecil Wyche

Personal details
- Born: Henry Hitt Watkins; June 24, 1866 Laurens County, South Carolina, U.S.
- Died: September 8, 1947 (aged 81)
- Education: University of Virginia; Furman University (M.A.) read law

Henry Hitt Watkins (June 24, 1866 – September 8, 1947) was a United States district judge of the United States District Court for the Western District of South Carolina.

== Education and career ==
Born in Laurens County, South Carolina, Watkins attended the University of Virginia and received a Master of Arts degree from Furman University in 1883. He read law to enter the bar in 1892, and was in private practice in Anderson, South Carolina from then until 1919. He was in the United States Army, Company C, First South Carolina Regiment in 1898, where he achieved the rank of captain. He was Quartermaster General for Governor Duncan Clinch Heyward from 1903 to 1907.

== Federal judicial service ==
On July 14, 1919, Watkins was nominated by President Woodrow Wilson to a seat on the United States District Court for the Western District of South Carolina vacated by Joseph T. Johnson. Watkins was confirmed by the United States Senate on July 22, 1919, and received his commission the same day. He assumed senior status on December 31, 1936, serving in that capacity until his death on September 8, 1947.

== Sources ==
Legal offices
Preceded by Joseph T. Johnson	Judge of the United States District Court for the Western District of South Carolina; 1919–1936	Succeeded by Charles Cecil Wyche
