= John Beam Vreeland =

American attorney and politician (1852–1923)

John B. Vreeland
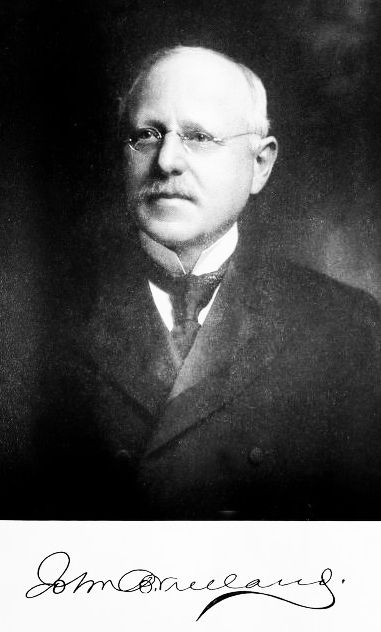

United States Attorney for the District of New Jersey
- In office 1903–1913
- President: Theodore Roosevelt; William Howard Taft
- Preceded by: Cortlandt Parker, Jr.
- Succeeded by: John Warren Davis

Morris County Judge
- In office 1898–1903
- Appointed by: Foster McGowan Voorhees

Member of the New Jersey Senate
- In office 1895–1898

Personal details
- Born: December 30, 1852 Newark, New Jersey, U.S
- Died: July 1, 1923 (aged 70)
- Party: Republican
- Spouse(s): Ida A. PIOTROWSKI Randolph (married 1876; died 1896); Ida King Smith (married 1897; died ?)
- Children: Eda A. and Vera E.
- Parents: George Washington Vreeland (father); Sarah M. Smith Vreeland (mother)

John Beam Vreeland (December 30, 1852 – July 1, 1923) was an attorney and Republican Party politician from Morristown, New Jersey. He served in the New Jersey Senate and as the United States Attorney for the district of New Jersey.

== Early life ==
Vreeland was born in Newark, New Jersey on December 30, 1852. His father, George Washington Vreeland, was the owner of a soda-water bottling business. In Newark, Vreeland attended public schools, and graduated from Newark High School (now Barringer High School) at fifteen.

In 1868, Vreeland and his parents moved to and settled in Morristown. Over the following four years, he participated in several business ventures under the guidance of his father. He later studied in the law profession, then worked in the office of Frederick G. Burnham and later Colonel Frederick A. DeMott.

== Legal career and politics ==
In November 1875, Vreeland was admitted as an attorney as well as solicitor in chancery, and he proceeded to pratuce law in Morristown. He partnered with Edward A. Quayle between 1876 and 1879. After becoming a counsellor in June 1879, he began practicing law by himself for nearly a quarter-century. On April 1, 1903, he became a senior member of the firm Vreeland, King, Wilson & Lindabury. The firm was dissolved on April 7, 1912, which prompted Vreeland to establish a partnership with C. Franklin Wilson. The new firm was operating under the name "Vreeland & Wilson", and was headquartered at No. 21 South Street.

Vreeland was notable for siding with the interest of his home city, county, and State. In 1892, Chancellor McGill appointed him a special master in chancery. Vreeland's public service roles included deputy county clerk, acting prosecutor of pleas for Morris County, and city counsel of Morristown. In 1895, he was nominated for the office of State senator by Republican party, and won the election with a plurality of more than 1,500.

Throughout his tenure as a State Senator, Vreeland introduced "The School Teachers' Retirement Fund Bill," which was enacted into law in 1896. He was also a member of the committee responsible for the revision of laws, as well as the chairman for the joint committee on state hospitals for the insane.

In 1898, Vreeland received an appointment from the acting governor of New Jersey, Foster M. Voorhees, to the position of judge in the courts of Morris County, for a five-year term starting on April 1 of the same year. On October 20, 1903, President Theodore Roosevelt appointed Vreeland as the United States attorney for the district of New Jersey, ad interim. On December 16, 1903, Vreeland secured the same position for a full four-year term. On December 9, 1907, he was reappointed to the same position for another four-year term.

== Miscellaneous ==
Vreeland was an active member of the South Street Presbyterian Church of Morristown. Furthermore, he held membership in F. and A. M., Cincinnati Lodge. From May 1, 1912, to May 7, 1913, he also served as president of County Bar Association of Morris county, New Jersey.
