= Charles Francis Lynch =

American judge (1884–1942)

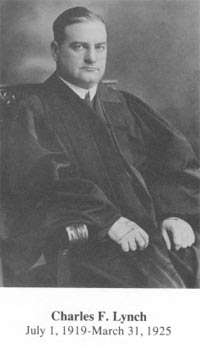
- Judge Charles Francis Lynch in his judicial robes

Judge of the United States District Court for the District of New Jersey
- In office July 1, 1919 – March 31, 1925
- Appointed by: Woodrow Wilson
- Preceded by: Thomas Griffith Haight
- Succeeded by: William Clark

Personal details
- Born: Charles Francis Lynch; January 9, 1884 Franklin, New Jersey, U.S.
- Died: June 17, 1942 (aged 58)
- Education: read law

Charles Francis Lynch (January 9, 1884 – June 17, 1942) was a United States district judge of the United States District Court for the District of New Jersey.

== Education and career ==
Born on January 9, 1884, in Franklin, New Jersey, Lynch read law in 1906. He entered private practice in Paterson, New Jersey from 1906 to 1913. He was an Assistant United States Attorney for the District of New Jersey from 1913 to 1916, serving as Second Assistant United States Attorney from 1913 to 1914, and as First Assistant United States Attorney from 1914 to 1916. He was the United States Attorney for the District of New Jersey from 1916 to 1919.

== Federal judicial service ==
Lynch was nominated by President Woodrow Wilson on June 16, 1919, to a seat on the United States District Court for the District of New Jersey vacated by Judge Thomas Griffith Haight. He was confirmed by the United States Senate on July 1, 1919, and received his commission the same day. His service terminated on March 31, 1925, due to his resignation.

== Later career and death ==
Following his resignation from the federal bench, Lynch returned to private practice in Paterson from 1925 to 1942. He was a city councilman for Paterson until 1940. He died on June 17, 1942.

== Sources ==
Legal offices
Preceded by Thomas Griffith Haight	Judge of the United States District Court for the District of New Jersey; 1919–1925	Succeeded by William Clark
