= Allen M. Fletcher =

American politician

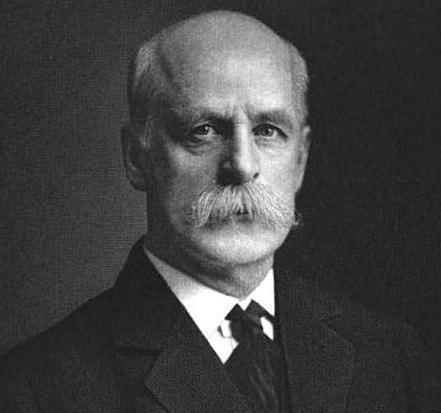
- Allen M. Fletcher

54th Governor of Vermont
- In office October 3, 1912 – January 7, 1915
- Lieutenant: Frank E. Howe
- Preceded by: John A. Mead
- Succeeded by: Charles W. Gates

Member of the Vermont Senate from Windsor County
- In office 1904–1905 Serving with Edgar J. Fish; James C. Taylor
- Preceded by: Lorenzo M. Greene; Charles H. Howard; Charles Downer
- Succeeded by: Oliver W. Daley; Fred L. Davis; Charles F. Aldrich

Member of the Vermont House of Representatives from Cavendish
- In office 1906–1912
- Preceded by: Elliot G. White
- Succeeded by: Daniel J. Stimets
- In office 1902–1903
- Preceded by: Charles W. Whitcomb
- Succeeded by: Elliot G. White

Personal details
- Born: September 25, 1853 Indianapolis, Indiana, US
- Died: May 11, 1922 (aged 68) Rutland, Vermont, US
- Resting place: Crown Hill Cemetery and Arboretum, Section 7, Lot 69; 39.8208886°N 86.1745115°W
- Party: Republican
- Spouse: Mary Elizabeth Bence (July 18, 1857 – May 9, 1942)
- Children: 1
- Profession: Banker; Businessman; Politician

Allen Miller Fletcher (September 25, 1853 – May 11, 1922) was an American politician who served as the 54th governor of Vermont from 1912 to 1915.

== Biography ==
Fletcher was born in Indianapolis, Indiana, on September 25, 1853. The son of a successful banker whose family was originally from Proctorsville, Vermont, he was educated at Willston Seminary in East Hampton, Massachusetts, and became a banker and businessman with homes in Indianapolis and New York City. In 1881 he built a summer home in Proctorsville. He married Mary E. Bence and they had three children. In 1899 he moved to New York City and became a member of the Stock Exchange. Six years later he retired to spend more time in Vermont.

A Republican, Fletcher was a Proctorsville Village Trustee and served in the Vermont House of Representatives from 1902 to 1903, the Vermont State Senate from 1904 to 1905, and the Vermont House again from 1906 to 1912. He was a delegate to the Republican National Convention in 1908. Fletcher was a leader in the legislature; during his Senate term he was chairman of the Finance Committee. During the 1906 to 1908 legislative session, he was chairman of the House Appropriations Committee. In his final two House terms, he was chairman of both the Rules and Ways & Means Committees.

In 1912, Fletcher was elected governor over Democrat Harland B. Howe and Progressive Fraser Metzger, and he served from 1912 to 1915. Fletcher was selected by the Vermont General Assembly after no candidate obtained the popular vote majority required by the Vermont Constitution. While in office the end of Fletcher's term was extended from October 1914 to January 1915 as part of changing the start and end dates of all statewide offices to January.

After leaving the Governor's office, Fletcher returned to his business interests, and was an unsuccessful candidate for the Republican U.S. Senate nomination in 1916, losing to incumbent Carroll S. Page.

== Death and legacy ==
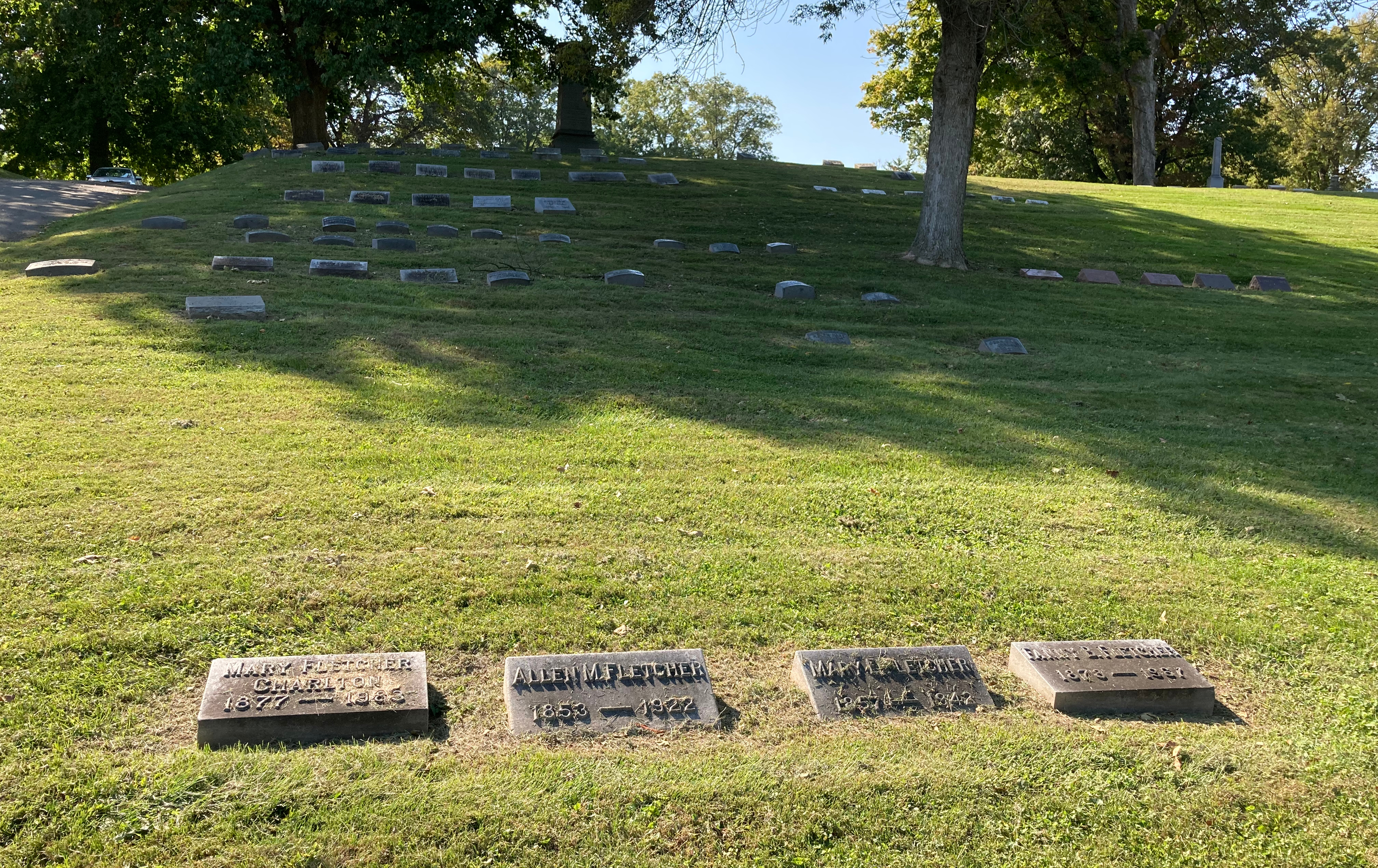
Fletcher's grave at Crown Hill Cemetery

Fletcher died of a cerebral hemorrhage while staying at Rutland's Berwick Hotel. He is interred at Crown Hill Cemetery in Indianapolis, Indiana.

Fletcher's family made numerous contributions for civic causes in Cavendish and Ludlow including constructing and donating Ludlow's Fletcher Library in 1901. His home "The Castle" is now an inn and restaurant near Okemo Mountain ski resort. In addition, his heirs donated the Ludlow property that is today the Fletcher Farm School, a non-profit educational center that offers instruction in the arts.

Fletcher's son Allen M. Fletcher Jr. served in the Vermont House and Senate in the 1940s.

Party political offices
Preceded by John A. Mead	Republican nominee for Governor of Vermont; 1912	Succeeded by Charles W. Gates
Political offices
Preceded by John A. Mead	Governor of Vermont; 1912–1915	Succeeded by Charles W. Gates
