= Charles Sherman Haight Sr. =

Charles Sherman Haight (August 8, 1870 – February 20, 1938) is the grandfather of Charles Sherman Haight. He was an Admiralty Expert, Specialist on International Relations in Shipping, founder of a boys school, and Founder of Seamen's Church Institute of New York and New Jersey.

== Works ==
He authored a legal book about the laws relating to bills of lading. A Pan-American Financial Conference was held in Washington, D.C., May 24–29, 1915, under the auspices of the United States.

== Biography ==
Haight graduated as a lawyer from Yale Graduate in 1892. He worked at the law firm Haight, Griffin, Deming Gardner and was director of the United States Leather Company and the Maritime Association of the Port of New York.
