= Charles W. Gates =

American politician

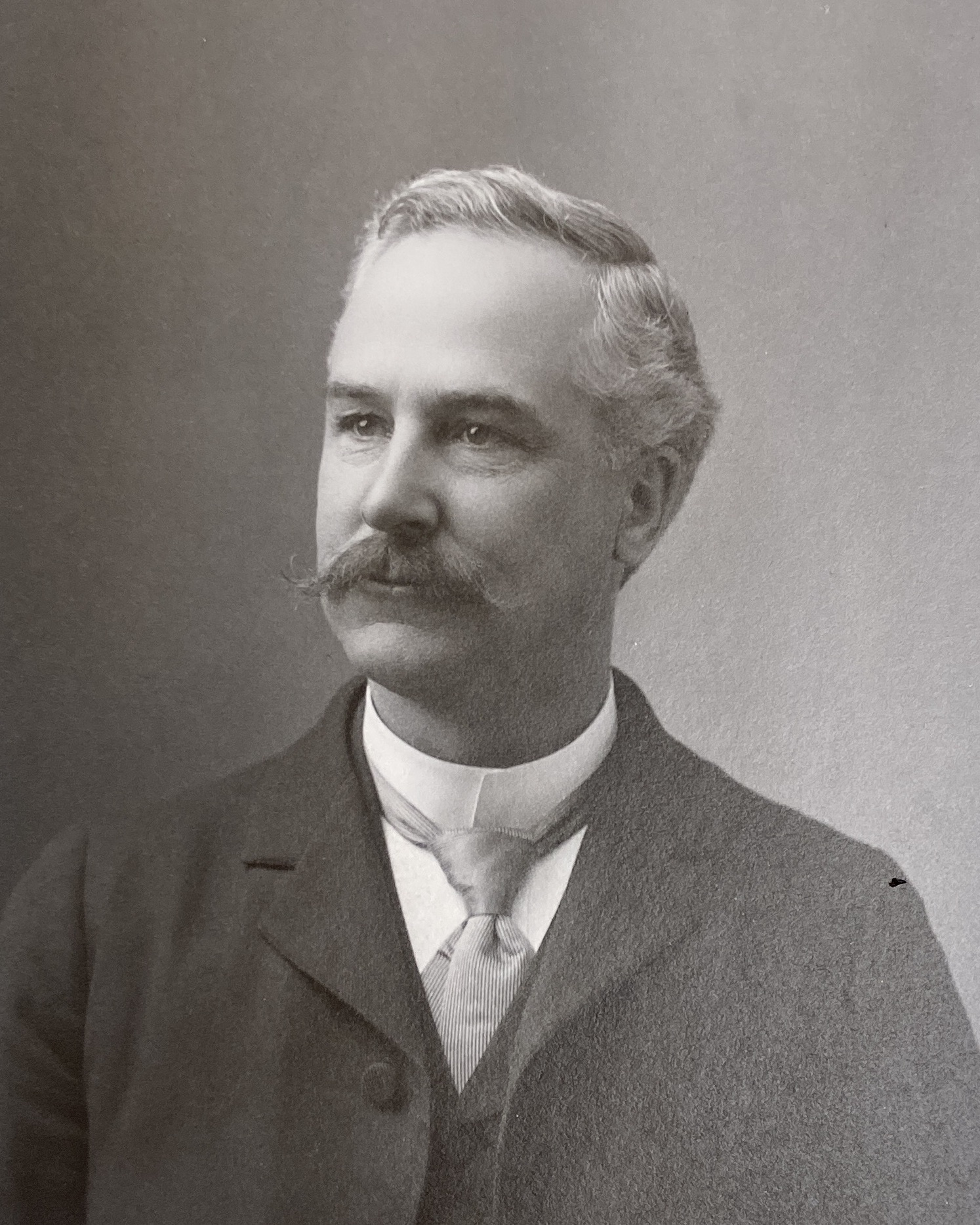
- Gates in 1900

55th Governor of Vermont
- In office January 7, 1915 – January 4, 1917
- Lieutenant: Hale K. Darling
- Preceded by: Allen M. Fletcher
- Succeeded by: Horace F. Graham

Member of the Vermont Senate
- In office 1900–1902 Serving with H. Charles Royce, Orrice Ballard
- Preceded by: James Moore Foss, William Sherman Soule, Moses P. Perley
- Succeeded by: Edwin, M. Brown, Byron H. Combs
- Constituency: Franklin County

Member of the Vermont House of Representatives
- In office 1898–1900
- Preceded by: William J. Towle
- Succeeded by: Albert C. Richard
- Constituency: Franklin

Personal details
- Born: January 12, 1856 Franklin, Vermont, US
- Died: July 1, 1927 (aged 71) Franklin, Vermont, US
- Party: Republican
- Spouse: Mary Elizabeth Hayden Gates
- Children: Edith Rebecca Gates, Paul Hayden Gates, Winslow Harrison Gates
- Profession: Businessman

Charles Winslow Gates (January 12, 1856, in Franklin, Vermont – July 1, 1927) was an American politician who served as the 55th governor of Vermont from 1915 to 1917.

== Biography ==
Gates was born January 12, 1856, son of Harrison and Leona Rebecca (Shedd) Gates, in Franklin, Vermont. He graduated from St. Johnsbury Academy in 1880, and was a teacher and principal of the Franklin Academy until 1884. He married Mary Elizabeth Hayden on April 9, 1890. They had one daughter, Edith Rebecca, and two sons, Paul Hayden and Winslow Harrison.

== Career ==
Gates purchased a mercantile in 1884 which he operated successfully while maintaining his homestead farm. President of the Franklin County Fair Association and a Director of the Enosburg Falls Savings Bank, he also founded the Franklin Telephone Company in 1895. He served in the Vermont House from 1898 to 1900, in the state Senate from 1900 to 1902. He was appointed a State Highway Commissioner in 1904 by Governor Charles Bell and again in 1906 by Governor Fletcher Proctor, serving on the commission until 1914. During his service, he secured appropriations for permanent road construction and maintenance.

Since Gates was deemed a Republican with progressive ideas, in 1914 he was nominated for governor in an attempt by Republicans to heal the rift between party activists who supported President Taft's reelection in 1912 and Progressives who supported Theodore Roosevelt. He was elected and served from January 7, 1915, to January 4, 1917. During his term Vermont enacted direct primaries for nominating US House and Senate candidates, worker's compensation, a junior and senior high school system, and a public school vocational education program. Gates was an unsuccessful candidate for the Republican US Senate nomination in 1916, after which he returned to his Franklin County business interests.

== Death ==
Gates died in Franklin on July 1, 1927. He was interred at Maple Grove Cemetery in Franklin.

Party political offices
Preceded by Allen M. Fletcher	Republican nominee for Governor of Vermont; 1914	Succeeded by Horace F. Graham
Political offices
Preceded by Allen M. Fletcher	Governor of Vermont; 1915–1917	Succeeded by Horace F. Graham
