= Charles Haight =

American politician (1838–1891)

Member of the U.S. House of Representatives from New Jersey's 2nd district
- In office March 4, 1867 – March 3, 1871
- Preceded by: William A. Newell
- Succeeded by: Samuel C. Forker

Member of the New Jersey General Assembly
- In office 1860–1862

Personal details
- Born: January 4, 1838 Colts Neck Township, New Jersey, U.S.
- Died: August 1, 1891 (aged 53) Freehold, New Jersey, U.S.
- Resting place: Maplewood Cemetery; Freehold, New Jersey, U.S.
- Party: Democratic
- Relations: Thomas Griffith Haight (nephew)
- Education: Princeton College
- Profession: Politician; lawyer
- Military career
- Allegiance: United States
- Service years: 1861–1865
- Rank: Brigadier general
- Conflicts: American Civil War

Charles Haight (January 4, 1838 – August 1, 1891) was an American lawyer and Democratic Party politician who represented New Jersey's 2nd congressional district in the United States House of Representatives from 1867 to 1871.

== Early life ==
Haight was born in Colts Neck Township, New Jersey, on January 4, 1838, to Thomas Haight, later a Democratic nominee for governor of New Jersey in 1847. He attended private schools in Freehold, New Jersey, and graduated from Princeton College in 1857. He studied law, was admitted to the bar in 1861 and commenced practice in Freehold.

== Career ==
Haight was a member of the New Jersey General Assembly from 1860 to 1862 and served as speaker in 1861 and 1862. He was commissioned a brigadier general of militia on May 27, 1861, and during the American Civil War was in command of Camp Vredenburgh from August 22, 1862, until the close of the war.

Haight was elected as a Democrat to the Fortieth and Forty-first Congresses, serving in office from March 4, 1867, to March 3, 1871, but was not a candidate for renomination in 1870 to the Forty-second Congress.

After leaving Congress, he resumed the practice of law. He was a delegate to the 1872 Democratic National Convention, and served as chairman of the State delegation. He was appointed prosecutor of the pleas. He was appointed prosecuting attorney of Monmouth County in 1873 and served until his death.

== Personal life ==
Haight was the uncle to Judge Thomas Griffith Haight.

Haight died in Freehold on August 1, 1891. He was interred in Maplewood Cemetery in Freehold.

U.S. House of Representatives
Preceded by William A. Newell	Member of the U.S. House of Representatives from New Jersey's 2nd congressional district March 4, 1867–March 3, 1871	Succeeded by Samuel C. Forker
