= List of New Jersey Supreme Court cases =

This is a select list of cases decided by the Supreme Court of New Jersey.

Case name	Citations	Summary
Holmes v. Walton	(1780)	First instance of judicial review by an American court
Hedgepeth and Williams v. Board of Education	131 N.J.L. 153, 35 A.2d 622 (1944)	Racial segregation in schools found to be in violation of the state constitution
Henningsen v. Bloomfield Motors, Inc.	32 N.J. 358, 161 A.2d 69 (1960)	Implied warranty of merchantability for a motor vehicle not negatable by dealer
State v. Driver	38 N.J. 255, 183 A.2d 655 (1962)	Defendant's refusal to take polygraph test inadmissible in criminal trials; Audio recordings admissible under certain standards
Southern Burlington Country N.A.A.C.P. v. Mt. Laurel Tp.	67 N.J. 151, 336 A.2d 713 (1975)	Municipalities prohibited by the state constitution from excluding low and moderate income families through zoning
In re Quinlan	70 N.J. 10, 355 A.2d 647 (1976)	Termination of life support for persons in a vegetative state allowed
New Jersey Board of Higher Education v. Shelton College	90 N.J. 470, 448 A.2d 988 (1982)	Requirement that religious colleges be licensed in order to grant baccalaureate degrees not a violation of the First Amendment or the state constitution
State v. Kelly	97 N.J. 178, 478 A.2d 364 (1984)	Expert testimony on battered woman syndrome admissible to establish self-defense in a murder case
Nicosia v. Wakefern Food Corp.	136 N.J. 401, 643 A.2d 554 (1994)	Contents of an employee manual may create an implied contract of employment absent a prominent disclaimer
Desilets v. Clearview Regional Board of Education	137 N.J. 585, 647 A.2d 150 (1994)	Publications in extracurricular school newspapers cannot be excluded unless in violation of specific school policy under the First Amendment
Blakey v. Continental Airlines, Inc.	164 N.J. 38, 751 A.2d 538 (2000)	Defamatory posts made by co-employees over an employer-provided internet messaging board qualifies as workplace harassment
Pasqua v. Council	186 N.J. 127, 892 A.2d 663 (2006)	Due Process Clause of the Fourteenth Amendment and the due process guarantee of the state constitution entitle indigent parents to assignment of counsel when facing incarceration for failure to pay child support
Lewis v. Harris	188 N.J. 415, 908 A.2d 196 (2006)	Legislative recognition of same-sex marriage or civil unions carrying the same rights and benefits as opposite-sex marriage required under state constitution
State v. Reid	194 N.J. 386, 954 A.2d 503 (2008)	State constitution protects an individual's subscriber information provided to their internet service provider against unreasonable searches or seizures
Stengart v. Loving Care Agency, Inc.	201 N.J. 300, 990 A.2d 650 (2010)	Under state common law, employers may not obtain privileged communications between an employee and their attorney made on a company-owned computer
