= Nicosia v. Wakefern Food Corp. =

1994 New Jersey court case

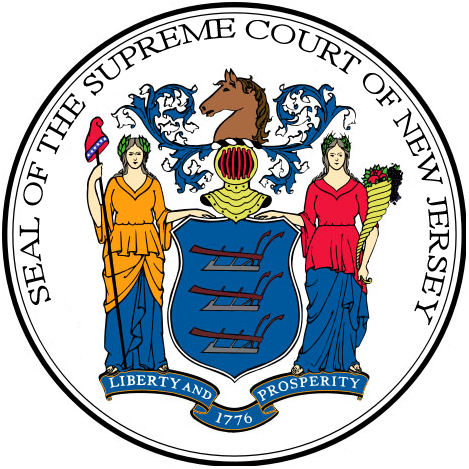
- Court: Supreme Court of New Jersey
- Full case name: Anthony Nicosia, Plaintiff-Respondent, v. Wakefern Food Corporation, Defendant-Appellant
- Argued: January 3, 1994
- Decided: June 30, 1994
- Citation: 136 N.J. 401, 643 A.2d 554 (1994)

Case history
- Prior actions: Certification granted, 134 N.J. 476, 634 A.2d 524 (1993)

Holding
- Absent a clear and prominent disclaimer, the contents of an employee manual may create an implied contract between an employer and employee.

Court membership
- Chief Justice: Robert N. Wilentz
- Associate Justices: Robert L. Clifford, Stewart G. Pollock, Daniel J. O'Hern, Alan B. Handler, Marie L. Garibaldi, Gary S. Stein

Case opinions
- Majority: Handler, joined by unanimous

Nicosia v. Wakefern Food Corp., 136 N.J. 401 (1994), is a Supreme Court of New Jersey decision that clarified the requirements for at-will employment disclaimers in employee handbooks within New Jersey. The Court held that for an employer to preserve at-will employment and prevent a handbook from becoming a binding contract, it must include a "clear and prominent disclaimer". In this specific case, the Court found that Wakefern's disclaimer lacked prominence and was therefore ineffective, further concluding that a jury may be necessary to determine a disclaimer's effectiveness.

== Background ==
The plaintiff, Anthony Nicosia, was a Warehouse Shift Supervisor who had worked for Wakefern Food Corporation since 1971. After 18 and a half years of employment, he sued the company for wrongful termination.

Merchandise was illegally removed from Wakefern's warehouse on at least two occasions during Nicosia's employment. Wakefern did not accuse Nicosia of stealing the merchandise, but terminated him for failing to maintain its safe storage and for allegedly failing to follow proper procedures after discovering the thefts. Nicosia maintained that he had followed company procedures by reporting both incidents through the appropriate channels. After his termination, Wakefern discovered merchandise in and around Nicosia's desk that it alleged constituted conversion.

== Argument ==
Nicosia's basis for the wrongful termination lawsuit was the existence of Wakefern's "Human Resources Policies and Procedures Manual," specifically the 11-page section titled "Wakefern Disciplinary Procedures." He asserted that the manual's existence and its widespread distribution constituted an implied employment contract, and that he was terminated without following the disciplinary steps outlined therein.

Wakefern argued that the manual did not constitute an employment contract and that Nicosia remained an at-will employee who had been lawfully terminated. The company contended that the manual was not widely distributed and therefore could not reasonably have led employees to believe that it created binding contractual obligations. It also relied on an express disclaimer contained in the manual. Wakefern further argued that, even if Nicosia's termination had been wrongful, the subsequently discovered evidence of conversion would have provided grounds for immediate dismissal under the after-acquired evidence doctrine.

== Decision ==
=== Lower Court's ruling ===
The trial court jury concluded that the 11-page section within Wakefern's employee manual constituted an implied employment contract, relying on precedents established in Woolley v. Hoffmann-La Roche, Inc., 99 N.J. 284 (1985). The jury found that the handbook's disclaimer was ineffective, that Wakefern had breached the implied contract by failing to follow the outlined disciplinary steps, and that Nicosia was not guilty of conversion.

=== Appellate Division's ruling ===
The appellate court affirmed the trial court's findings, agreeing with its conclusions regarding the existence of implied contract, the ineffectiveness of the disclaimer, and Wakefern's subsequent breach of contract.

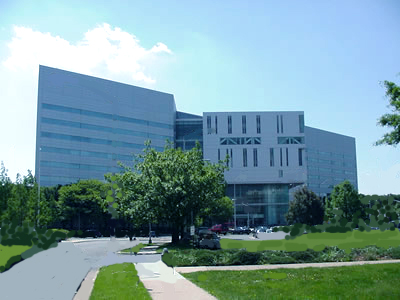
Richard J. Hughes Justice Complex, seat of the New Jersey Supreme Court.

=== Supreme Court ruling and reasoning ===
The New Jersey Supreme Court affirmed the decisions of the lower courts in an opinion authored by Justice Alan B. Handler.

The Court's reasoning remained rooted in the precedent of Woolley v. Hoffmann-La Roche, Inc., which established that widely distributed employee handbooks could constitute a unilateral contract of employment if a reasonable employee interpreted them as such. To maintain at-will employment, an employer must include a clear and prominent disclaimer stating that the handbook is not an employment contract

The New Jersey Supreme Court held that Wakefern's employment manual created an implied contract. Although the manual had been distributed to only 300 of the company's 1,500 non-union employees, the Court concluded that its circulation was sufficiently broad to support the existence of contractual obligations beyond those who had personally received a copy. While Nicosia had not received the entire manual, he had received the relevant 11-page disciplinary section.

The Court further held that Wakefern's disclaimer was insufficiently prominent and clear to provide employees with adequate notice that the manual did not create binding contractual obligations. It therefore concluded that Wakefern had breached the implied employment contract by terminating Nicosia without following the disciplinary procedures set out in the manual. The Court also declined to address Wakefern's after-acquired evidence defense because the jury had found that Nicosia had not committed conversion.

== Impact and legal significance ==
Nicosia v. Wakefern Food Corp. clarified the application of New Jersey law governing implied employment contracts. Building on Woolley v. Hoffmann-La Roche, Inc., the Court reaffirmed that provisions in an employee handbook may create enforceable contractual obligations when employees could reasonably understand the handbook to govern the terms and conditions of their employment, unless those obligations are effectively disclaimed.

The decision also provided guidance to employers on the drafting and distribution of employee handbooks and disclaimers. Employers seeking to preserve at-will employment status must use clear and prominent language indicating that handbook provisions do not create contractual obligations.

The case established stricter requirements for disclaimers intended to negate implied contracts. It mandated that such disclaimers be both "prominent" and "clear" to be effective, suggesting methods such as highlighting or underlining the text to ensure it captures the reader's attention. Furthermore, the case highlighted the jury's role in assessing a disclaimer's effectiveness; while its prominence may sometimes be decided as a matter of law, the clarity and overall effectiveness of its content in negating an implied contract often remain questions for the jury to resolve based on an employee's reasonable expectations.

Nicosia was later cited in Angela Maselli v. Valley National Bancorp in connection with the interpretation of handbook disclaimers. The appellate court explained that unambiguous disclaimer language is not subject to a contrary reasonable interpretation by employees. Because the disclaimer at issue in Maselli was found to be ambiguous, the court reversed the trial court's decision and remanded the case for further proceedings.
