= Blakey v. Continental Airlines, Inc. =

New Jersey state case

Blakey v. Continental Airlines
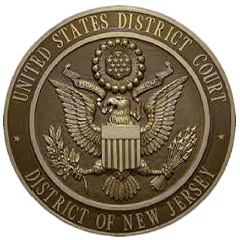
- Court: United States District Court for the District of New Jersey
- Full case name: Captain Tammy S. Blakey, v. Continental Airlines, Inc., a foreign corporation
- Decided: January 30, 1998
- Docket nos.: 93-cv-2194
- Citation: 992 F. Supp. 731

Court membership
- Judge sitting: William G. Bassler

Blakey v. Continental Airlines
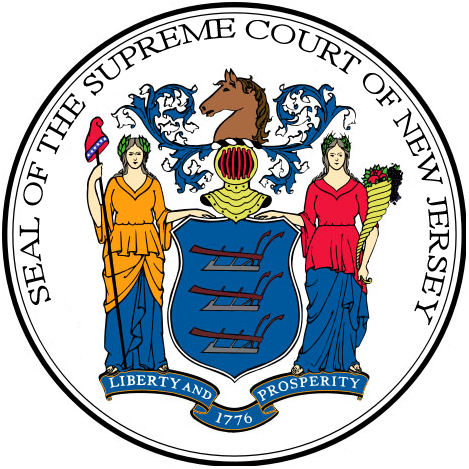
- Court: Supreme Court of New Jersey
- Full case name: Tammy S. Blakey, Plaintiff-Appellant, v. Continental Airlines, Inc., a Foreign Corporation, Kaye V. Riggs, Joe Vacca, Mark J. Farrow, Donald Jensen, Dave Orozco and Thomas N. Stivala, Defendants-Respondents, and ABC Corporations (1-100), Steve Abdu and John Does (1-100), Defendants.
- Argued: February 2, 2000
- Decided: June 1, 2000
- Citation: 164 N.J. 38, 751 A.2d 538 (2000)

Case history
- Prior actions: Blakey v. Continental Airlines, Inc., 322 N.J.Super. 187, 730 A.2d 854 (1999); certification granted, 162 N.J. 126, 741 A.2d 94 (1999).

Holding
- Defamatory comments by co-employees over an employer-provided internet message board qualifies as workplace harassment.

Court membership
- Chief Justice: Deborah T. Poritz
- Associate Justices: Daniel J. O'Hern, Gary S. Stein, James H. Coleman Jr., Virginia A. Long, Peter G. Verniero, Jaynee LaVecchia

Case opinions
- Majority: O'Hern, joined by unanimous

Laws applied
- New Jersey Law Against Discrimination

Blakey v. Continental Airlines, 992 F.Supp. 731 (D.N.J. 1998) and 164 N.J. 38 (2000), is a case concerning whether an employer must be held liable for harassment that can potentially occur on an internal internet bulletin board (which could be manifested as anything from a company forum to a mailing list). The plaintiff brought action under the federal district court for claiming a hostile work environment sexual harassment under Title VII of Civil Rights Act of 1964 and New Jersey Law Against Discrimination (LAD). Concurrently, the plaintiff brought action under the New Jersey state court alleging that employer was liable for hostile work environment arising from allegedly defamatory statements. While the case began as a sexual harassment lawsuit, the unusual circumstances involving the piloting forum where much of the harassment took place forced the courts to explore important questions concerning liabilities for content posted in a decentralized, electronic manner as is frequently the case on the internet.

== Background and Facts ==
Captain Tammy S. Blakey was an airline pilot working for Continental Airlines. Shortly after becoming the first female pilot to fly the Airbus A300 aircraft (and only one of five pilots among Continental's staff qualified to pilot the aircraft), she complained of a hostile work environment and sexual harassment based on the content of an internet message board. Pilots used this internet message board as part of a broader system to manage piloting assignments. Other instances of harassment were documented by her as well.

== U.S. District Court Case ==
The nature of the federal district court opinion centers on whether Blakey's sexual harassment claims were warranted and whether Continental Airlines was responsible for mitigating such harassment. The circumstances of this case were complicated by the fact that problems in Blakey's personal life magnified much of the psychological distress Blakey experienced. However, with the evidence at hand, it soon became clear to the jury that regardless of the permissibility of online content in making her case, other forms of harassment painted a clear picture of harassment based on gender discrimination. These other forms of harassment included leaving pornographic images in her cockpit and Blakey receiving physical messages of a threatening nature.

== New Jersey Supreme Court Case ==
The New Jersey Supreme Court explored the case from a more technical and jurisdictional perspective to clarify the precedent this case will set for future litigation of its kind.

=== The Workplace Online ===
First, the court considered whether a computer forum (or "bulletin board") can be reasonably considered an extension of the workplace such that Continental Airlines would be liable for any harassment that occurred in that extension. Much of the reasoning centered around the idea of whether the bulletin board was an integral part of the workplace much like a physical wood-and-cork bulletin board in a company break-room would be. Moreover, an analogy to harassment that occurs physically outside the workplace (such as at a bar frequented by workers of the company) was used to justify how the bulletin board on the Internet could similarly create a hostile environment for employees even if it was not strictly within the company's literal jurisdiction.

=== Personal Jurisdiction ===
Second, the court considered whether employees of the airline could be reasonably subject to the personal jurisdiction of the State of New Jersey even though employees would view and publish messages from disparate locations across the country. The court reasoned that because Blakey was based out of the Newark hub of Continental Airlines, most of the distress occurred within New Jersey's jurisdiction, in spite of people's ability to access the bulletin board anywhere and Blakeley, herself, flying all over the country regularly.

== Implications ==
This is the first case to set a clear precedent for how courts must deal with harassment in cyberspace. It clearly illustrates that the potential for employer liability existed even in the context of unmonitored blogging, and this can certainly be extended to other types of liability in other online harassment situations. Further, it demonstrates that employer liability extends beyond even employer-provided blogs as long as they are considered sufficiently integral to the workplace (since technically a third party operated the bulletin board in this case). With that said, the court acknowledged that clear privacy concerns arise from such ruling. The court's decision emphasizes that the intent is not to make companies monitor all employee communications, but rather to make clear that companies must take all necessary steps to stop harassment if the company has reason to believe it is occurring, whether it is online or in person.
