= Stengart v. Loving Care Agency, Inc. =

Stengart v. Loving Care Agency
- Court: New Jersey Supreme Court
- Full case name: Stengart v. Loving Care Agency
- Decided: March 30, 2010
- Citation: 201 N.J. 300, 990 A.2d. 650 (2010)

Case history
- Prior actions: BER-L-858-08 (N.J. Super. Ct. L. Div. Feb. 5, 2009); 408 N.J. Super. 54, 973 A.2d 390 (Super. Ct. App. Div. 2009).

Court membership
- Judges sitting: Chief Justice Stuart Rabner; Justices V.Long, J.Lavecchia, Albin, Wallace, Rivera-Soto, and Hoens

Case opinions
- Majority: Unanimous; Dissent: none

Stengart v. Loving Care Agency, Inc., 990 A.2d 650 (2010) was a New Jersey Supreme Court case that provided guidance to employees as to what extent they may expect privacy and confidentiality in personal e-mails composed on company-owned computers. Through its decision, the court ruled on two key issues which concluded that there should be a "reasonable" expectation of privacy in personal e-mails on company computers, and that attorney–client communication privileges and privacy should not be violated. On March 30, 2010, Chief Justice Stuart Rabner and the New Jersey Supreme Court affirmed the appellate court's decision by overturning the previous ruling made by the trial court. The trial court previously determined that a company-created policy provided sufficient warning to employees that all communications and activities performed on company-owned computers were subject to review by the employer and that there should be no expectation of privacy because of such policies.

== Prior history of the case ==
The plaintiff, Marina Stengart, was a former employee of Loving Care Agency, Inc. who provided care services for children and adults. In December 2007, Stengart resigned from her position at Loving Care due to gender discrimination issues, which ultimately led to an action against Loving Care Agency, Inc. Just prior to her resignation, Stengart wrote several e-mails to her lawyer from her personal, password-protected e-mail account using a company-owned laptop. In preparation for the action being taken by Stengart, Loving Care Agency, Inc. hired a computer forensics expert to create a forensics disk image of the hard drive in the computer used by Stengart while employed with the company.

During discovery, the plaintiff was made aware of Loving Care's possession of the e-mails from the company-owned laptop that Stengart used. Upon learning of the acquisition of the e-mails by Loving Care, Stengart's attorney, Donald Jacobs filed a motion in Bergen County court for all e-mails to be returned and that copies be destroyed. Mr. Jacobs' motion was denied, and the trial court held that Loving Care's use of the e-mails would be permitted in court. Mr. Jacobs' motion was denied by the trial judge on the basis that such e-mails were not protected by attorney-client privilege because the company's policy indicated that the e-mails were a part of the company's property.

Unsatisfied with the trial judge's decision to allow the e-mails to remain with the defendant, Stengart and her attorney decided to present their case to the New Jersey Superior Court, Appellate Division. The appellate judge subsequently reversed the decision of the trial court by saying that the trial court had not exhibited proper respect to attorney–client privacy, and thereby ordered that the case be heard in front of a judge in the Chancery Division. Furthermore, the appellate court also warned that Loving Care's counsel could have sanctions imposed upon them for violating the attorney–client privileges and obtaining copies of e-mails that they did not have rights to. Once again however, the decision of the court was challenged, but this time by Loving Care Agency. After the decision was made by the appellate court, Loving Care Agency then decided to take the case to the New Jersey Supreme Court for the final ruling.

== New Jersey Supreme Court decision ==
During the New Jersey Supreme Court's hearing of the case, the court set out to determine whether or not Loving Care's computer use policy was sufficient notice that her privacy should be expected while using the company-owned laptop. After hearing the facts of the case and reviewing the previous holdings from the lower courts, the Supreme Court affirmed the decision previously made by the appellate court that Stengart had reasonable expectations that her attorney–client communications would remain private. The decision of the court was formed on the basis of a few principles: (1) that Loving Care's policy was "ambiguous" and did not specify that personal, password-protected e-mails were subject to company review, (2) that reasonable expectation of privacy could have been created due to the company's allowing of "personal use" of the computer, and (3) that company interests cannot infringe on attorney–client privileges. In addition to the faults in the wording of the company's policy, the New Jersey Supreme Court also pointed out faults in the company's ideas as to what the company can and cannot do. In this case, the court re-emphasized the importance of respecting attorney–client privileges and warned Loving Care's attorneys that by reading the e-mails, they were in violation of the Rules of Professional Conduct.

Although the ruling of the Supreme Court affirmed the earlier decision of the appellate court in favor of Stengart, there was an important difference in the decisions by the two courts. This difference between the Supreme Court and the Appellate Court was in how each court decided where the case would go next. In the ruling by the appellate court, it was decided that the case should be remanded to the Chancery Division because the court determined that Loving Care's attorney's did in fact violate the Rules of Professional Conduct and that consideration should be given as to whether or not sanctions should be imposed on Loving Care's counsel. The Supreme Court, however, decided to modify the appellate court's judgment by requiring that the case be remanded back to the trial court for a decision as to what sanctions, if any, should be imposed on Loving Care's counsel.

== Importance of the case ==
The ruling set a precedent for interpreting the boundaries between the interests of the employer and the rights of the employee, and it changed the way employers create and implement their policies pertaining to the use of company-owned computers and software. Prior to this case, the common belief was that a company owns all electronic information found on their computer and can use it however they desire.

One of the most important questions this case answered was in regards to whether or not an employer was legally allowed to obtain and review information from its employee's attorney–client communications. The case clarified that although a company could create a policy and require an employee to abide by it, legally, they could not require an individual to give up their rights such as attorney–client privileges. The court further went on to explain that a company can limit or prevent the use of a company-owned computer; however, accessing personal and private information of the employee is off limits.

The decision led many employers to re-draft their policies to avoid future misunderstandings and uncertainties. Such company electronic communication and Information Technology (IT) policies now commonly describe how information can be gathered from company computers, the storage capabilities of company computers, and ways in which monitoring of information will be conducted. This also has helped employers eliminate any questions or doubt as to what information and monitoring methods the company is entitled to and also what the employee can and cannot do.

The case emphasized the importance of respecting attorney–client privileges and what implications can come about if these rights are neglected by an opposing counsel. This case made it clear that the forensic reviews of an employee's computer files are to follow strict guidelines and protocols. These protocols apply not only the acquisition of the forensic files, but also to handling and presentation of such information to the court. Also, any forensic files obtained that contain privileged material must be separated from permissible evidence and such information must be disclosed to the opposing counsel and the court for necessary action. A counsel's failure to abide by these guidelines could result in the evidence being deemed inadmissible in court and could bring about court sanctions on the parties involved in the acquisition of the private and restricted information.

Although the decision of Stengart v. Loving Care applies only in the state of New Jersey, the case has provided guidance for many other states in the U.S. and has resulted in the adoption of this ruling throughout the country. With relatively so few laws pertaining to computer forensics and information technology (IT), this case has proved important because of the standards it sets and the answers it provides to major issues and concerns in IT law.

== See also ==
- Chancery Division
- New Jersey Supreme Court
- New Jersey Superior Court, Appellate Division
