= Pasqua v. Council =

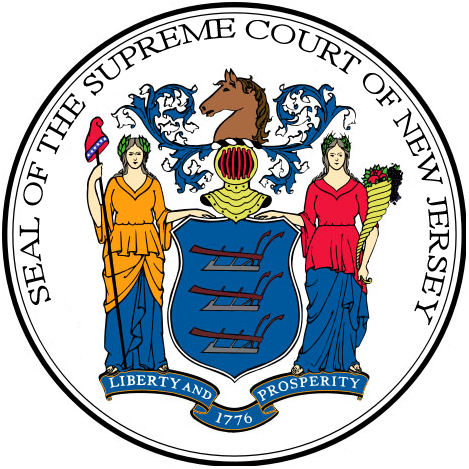
- Court: Supreme Court of New Jersey
- Full case name: Anne Pasqua, Ray Tolbert and Michael Anthony, individually and on behalf of all persons similarly situated, Plaintiffs-Appellants, v. Hon. Gerald J. Council and Hon. F. Lee Forrester, individually and in their official capacity as Judges of the Superior Court and on behalf of all Superior Court Judges of the State of New Jersey who have in the past conducted Ability to Pay Hearings or who will in the future conduct Ability to Pay Hearings, Hon. Deborah Poritz, individually and in her official capacity as Chief Justice of the Supreme Court of New Jersey and Hon. Richard J. Williams, individually and in his official capacity as Administrative Director of the Courts of the State of New Jersey, Defendants–Respondents.
- Argued: October 24, 2005
- Decided: March 8, 2006

Holding
- The Due Process Clause of the Fourteenth Amendment and the due process guarantee of the New Jersey Constitution entitle indigent parents facing incarceration for failure to pay child support to assignment of counsel.

Court membership
- Chief Justice: Deborah T. Poritz
- Associate Justices: Virginia A. Long, Jaynee LaVecchia, James R. Zazzali, Barry T. Albin, John E. Wallace, Jr., Roberto A. Rivera-Soto

Case opinions
- Majority: Albin, joined by unanimous
- Poritz took no part in the consideration or decision of the case.

Laws applied
- U.S. Const. amend. XIV, N.J. Const. art. I, ¶ 1

Pasqua v. Council, 892 A.2d 663 (N.J. 2006) was a landmark family court decision decided by the Supreme Court of New Jersey in 2006. The court ruled that indigent parents facing the serious threat of incarceration for nonpayment of child support were entitled to legal counsel.

In 2011, the United States Supreme Court decided the case of Turner v. Rogers, which held that the US Constitution does not always mandate the appointment of counsel under these circumstances. This ruling does not negatively impact the Pasqua decision.

- Initially, Pasqua was decided under the New Jersey State Constitution. States are free to grant more rights than the Federal Constitution.
- Second, the United States Supreme Court distinguished cases where both parties are proceeding without counsel from those where the full weight of the State is brought against a pro se litigant facing jail. Under New Jersey's process, essentially all proceedings seeking to incarcerate a child support debtor are brought by the Probation Department and thus, even under the Turner decision, the appointment of counsel is still mandatory.
- Finally, the Supreme Court specifically "did not address civil contempt proceedings where the underlying child support payment is owed to the State, for example, for reimbursement of welfare funds paid to the parent with custody." These cases constitute roughly 58% of all enforcement proceedings; however, despite not being specifically addressed the right of due process would not apply less to a litigant depending on who is owed the funds.

== Facts ==
David Perry Davis, Princeton, argued the cause for appellants.

Patrick DeAlmeida, Assistant Attorney General, argued the cause for respondents (Peter C. Harvey, Attorney General of New Jersey, attorney; Michael J. Haas, Assistant Attorney General, of counsel).

Melville D. Miller, Jr., President, argued the cause for amicus curiae Legal Services of New Jersey.

David B. Rubin, Metuchen, argued the cause for amicus curiae New Jersey State Bar Association.

Justice ALBIN delivered the opinion of the Court.

The right to counsel is among our most precious of constitutional rights because it is the necessary means of securing other fundamental rights. It has long been recognized that the right to a fair trial would be an empty promise without the right to counsel. In this appeal, we must determine whether indigent parents charged with violating child support orders and subject to coercive incarceration at ability-to-pay hearings have a right to appointed counsel. We now hold that our Federal and State Constitutions guarantee that right.

== Background ==
Since the passage of the Family Support Act of 1988 (Pub.L. 100–485, 102 Stat. 2343), the NJ family court system routinely used incarceration without due process as an enforcement tool on parents who failed to pay support. In 2005,

Plaintiffs Anne Pasqua, Ray Tolbert, and Michael Anthony are parents who were arrested for not complying with their court-ordered child support obligations. Following their arrests, plaintiff Pasqua was brought before defendant Superior Court Judge F. Lee Forrester, and plaintiffs Tolbert and Anthony were brought before defendant Superior Court Judge Gerald J. Council. Those judges conducted enforcement hearings pursuant to Rule 1:10-3 to determine plaintiffs' ability to pay their support obligations. The essential purpose of those proceedings was to determine whether plaintiffs were in willful disobedience of previously entered court orders. At the hearings, plaintiffs were not represented by counsel. They also were not advised of a right to counsel and, if indigent, of a right to appointed counsel. Both Judge Forrester and Judge Council set an amount of support arrears to be paid by plaintiffs as a condition of their release.

- Pasqua was ordered to pay $3,400 in child support arrears as a condition of her release. She spent fifteen days in jail in addition to the three days she served before her hearing until she was freed without making any payment. As of January 2003, her child support obligations totaled $12,886.
- Tolbert was ordered to pay $10,000 of his arrears to secure his release. He spent fifty-six days in jail in addition to the seventeen days he served waiting for a hearing before he was freed, apparently without making a payment toward his arrears. As of January 2003, Tolbert owed $134,700 in child support obligations.
- Anthony served twenty-four days in jail before he appeared at an enforcement hearing and was released after paying $125 toward his arrears of $49,234. At the time of his release, he was warned that if he missed two future support payments an arrest warrant would issue, and indeed, when Anthony defaulted, one did. On that occasion, Anthony made another payment toward his arrears and the warrant was vacated. As of January 2003, Anthony remained unable to satisfy his $145 weekly support obligations.

In June 2000, plaintiffs filed a lawsuit in the United States District Court for the District of New Jersey seeking relief under 42 U.S.C.A. § 1983 and naming as defendants:

- Judge Forrester;
- Judge Council;
- Deborah Poritz, Chief Justice of the Supreme Court of New Jersey
- Richard Williams, former Administrative Director of the Courts.

In their complaint, plaintiffs sought a declaration that the Due Process Clause of the Fourteenth Amendment of the US Constitution guarantees the right to appointed counsel to indigent parents facing the loss of their liberty at child support enforcement proceedings. Plaintiffs also sought to enjoin defendants from using incarceration as a means of coercing compliance with support orders until indigent parents are provided appointed counsel. Plaintiffs asserted that injunctive relief is required because they still are indigent, cannot pay their support obligations, and face the potential loss of their freedom at future enforcement hearings without the assistance of counsel.

All three plaintiffs alleged that they were incarcerated in violation of their right to counsel due to policies and procedures promulgated by the Chief Justice and the Administrative Director of the Courts. In addition to the foregoing relief, plaintiffs also requested class certification for those similarly situated parents facing coercive incarceration at child support enforcement hearings.

The federal district court dismissed the complaint, reasoning that federal courts ordinarily should abstain from intervening in pending state cases, as explained in Younger v. Harris, 401 U.S. 37, 91 S.Ct. 746, 27 L.Ed.2d 669 (1971). The Third Circuit Court of Appeals affirmed, ruling that to grant "relief here would address issues that plaintiffs can raise in their own cases currently pending in the New Jersey courts."[1]Anthony v. Council, 316 F.3d 412, 421 (3d Cir.2003).

In February 2003, plaintiffs filed the same complaint in the Superior Court, Law Division, along with an order to show cause seeking preliminary restraints. Judge Feinberg declined plaintiffs' request for emergent relief, but set the matter down for oral argument. Defendants then filed a motion to dismiss the complaint. Because there was no apparent dispute over the factual allegations in the complaint, after hearing oral argument, Judge Feinberg directly addressed the legal issue raised. In doing so, she denied plaintiffs' application for class certification.

== Supreme Court decision ==
The New Jersey Supreme Court issued its ruling on March 8, 2006 it was as follows:

Under the due process guarantee of the New Jersey Constitution, the right to counsel attaches even to proceedings in which a litigant is not facing incarceration. For example, under our State Constitution, convicted sex offenders must be notified of their right to retain counsel and, if indigent, appointed counsel at Megan's Law tier classification hearings. Doe v. Poritz, 142 N.J. 1, 30-31, 106, 662 A.2d 367 (1995). At those hearings, the court determines the scope of community notification of such information as a sex offender's name, and home and work address, by assigning the offender to one of three tiers. Id. at 23-25, 662 A.2d 367. Although sex offenders are subject only to expanded stigmatization of their reputations in their communities depending on their tier classification, they have a due process "liberty interest" protected under Article I, Paragraph 1, triggering the right to counsel. Id. at 30-31, 104-06, 662 A.2d 367.

In addition, without referencing our State Constitution, we held in Rodriguez v. Rosenblatt that "as a matter of simple justice, no indigent defendant should be subjected to a conviction entailing imprisonment in fact or other consequence of magnitude without first having had due and fair opportunity to have counsel assigned without cost." 58 N.J. 281, 295, 277 A.2d 216 (1971); see also R. 7:3-2(b) ("If the court is satisfied that the defendant is indigent and that the defendant faces a consequence of magnitude ..., the court shall assign the municipal public defender to represent the defendant."). In Rodriguez, we considered "the substantial loss of driving privileges" as one type of "serious consequence" that would warrant assigning counsel to an indigent defendant. 58 N.J. at 295, 277 A.2d 216. We acknowledged "[t]he importance of counsel in an accusatorial system," underscoring that in a case with "any complexities[,] the untrained defendant is in no position to defend himself," and that in a case without "complexities, his lack of legal representation may place him at a disadvantage." Rodriguez, supra, 58 N.J. at 295, 277 A.2d 216. Relying on the principle of "simple justice" enunciated in Rodriguez, the Appellate Division in Crist v. New Jersey Division of Youth & Family Services ruled that the temporary loss or permanent termination of an indigent parent's rights to his or her child in a judicial proceeding is a consequence of magnitude requiring the assignment of counsel. 135 N.J.Super. 573, 575, 343 A.2d 815 (App. Div.1975); see also State v. Hermanns, 278 N.J.Super. 19, 29, 650 A.2d 360 (App.Div. 1994) (holding that significant monetary sanctions "give[] rise to the right to counsel under Rodriguez").

We also have held that due process guarantees the assignment of counsel to indigents in involuntary civil commitment proceedings. In re S.L., 94 N.J. 128, 136-37, 462 A.2d 1252 (1983); see also N.J.S.A 30:4-27.11 (affording patient involuntarily committed to psychiatric facility who is "unable to afford an attorney, the right to be provided with an attorney paid for by the appropriate government agency"). Cf. Perlmutter v. DeRowe, 58 N.J. 5, 17, 274 A.2d 283 (1971) (observing that civil arrest pursuant to writ of capias ad respondendum "is substantially analogous to arrest under a criminal complaint and a defendant should have all the same procedural rights and protections as if he were arrested on a criminal charge for the same fraud upon which the civil action and the [capias ad respondendum] are based").

- 676 We can find no principled reason why an indigent facing loss of motor vehicle privileges or a substantial fine in municipal court, termination of parental rights in family court, or tier classification in a Megan's Law proceeding would be entitled to counsel under state law but an indigent facing jail for allegedly willfully refusing to pay a child support judgment would not. Moreover, the indigent subject to incarceration for failure to pay support can hardly be distinguished from the indigent conferred with the right to counsel in an involuntary civil commitment hearing. We are persuaded that the due process guarantee of the New Jersey Constitution compels the assignment of counsel to indigent parents who are at risk of incarceration at child support enforcement hearings.
