= James H. Coleman (judge) =

American judge (1933–2024)

James H. Coleman, Jr.

Associate Justice of the Supreme Court of New Jersey
- In office December 16, 1994 – May 3, 2003
- Appointed by: Christine Todd Whitman
- Preceded by: Robert L. Clifford
- Succeeded by: John E. Wallace Jr.

Personal details
- Born: May 4, 1933 Lawrenceville, Virginia, U.S.
- Died: August 2, 2024 (aged 91)
- Education: Virginia State University (BA, 1956); Howard University (JD, 1959)

James H. Coleman Jr. (May 4, 1933 – August 2, 2024) was an American lawyer from New Jersey who served as an associate justice of the Supreme Court of New Jersey from December 1994 to May 2003. He was the first African-American to serve on the state's Supreme Court.

== Biography ==
Coleman was born on May 4, 1933, in Lawrenceville, Virginia. His father was a sharecropper, and Coleman attended racially segregated public schools due to the state's Jim Crow laws. He graduated from James S. Russell High School as class salutatorian, and graduated cum laude from Virginia State University in 1956. He then left Virginia and received his degree in law from George Washington University in 1959.

Coleman began his career as a private practice attorney in Roselle and Elizabeth, New Jersey, from 1960 to 1970. In 1964, he became a judge in the New Jersey Workers' Compensation Court and kept his position for nine years until he was appointed a judge for New Jersey's Union County Court. In 1994 he was nominated by Governor Christine Todd Whitman as an Associate Judge to the New Jersey Supreme Court, becoming the court's first African American judge. He served on the court for nine years, developing a reputation as "an unwavering advocate of social and racial justice". Over the course of his judicial career, he wrote more than 3,000 opinions.

Coleman died on August 2, 2024, at the age of 91.

Legal offices
Preceded by Robert L. Clifford	Associate Justice of the Supreme Court of New Jersey; 1994–2003	Succeeded by John E. Wallace Jr.
