= Lawrenceville, Virginia =

- Town
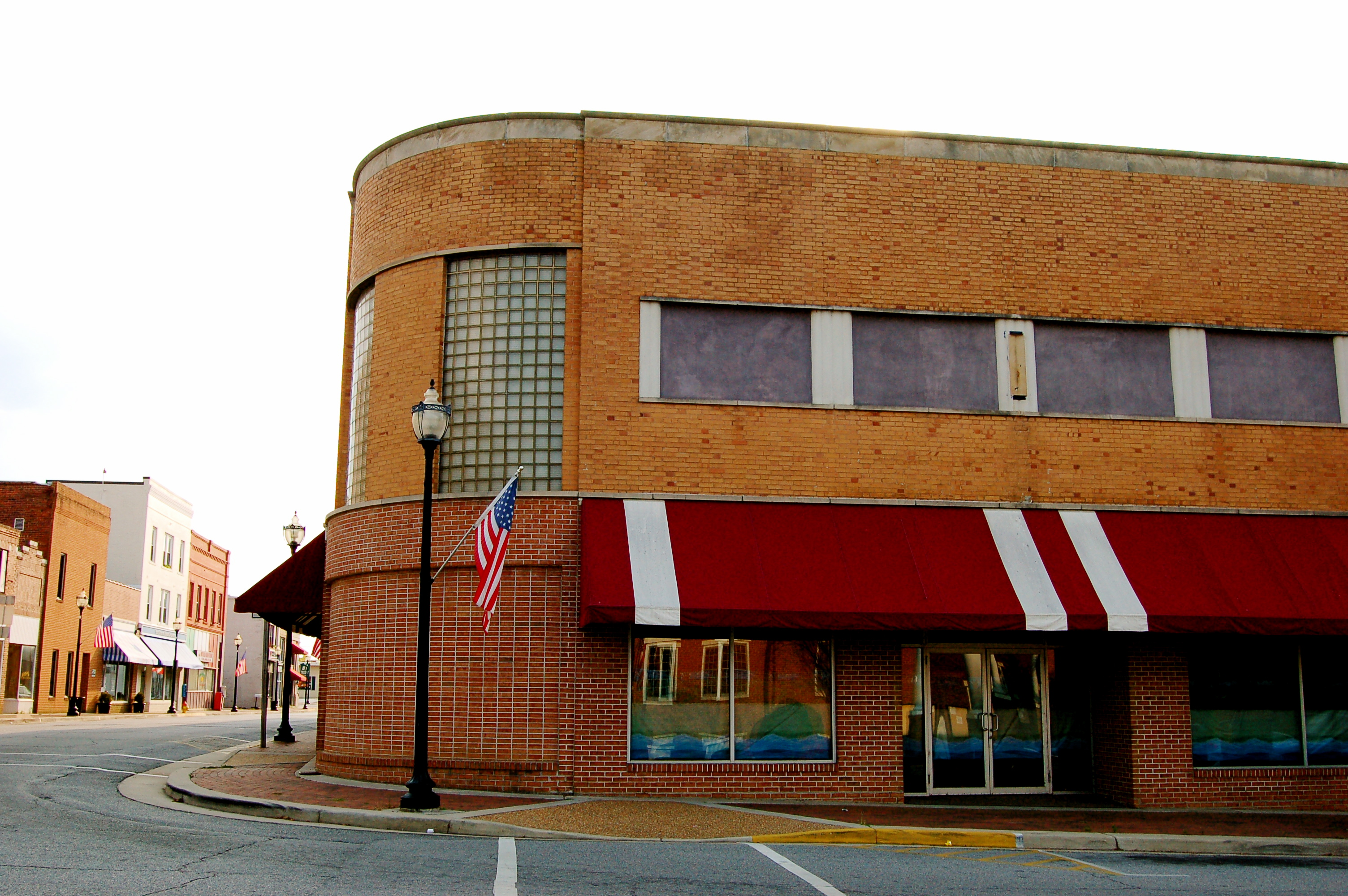
- Lawrenceville

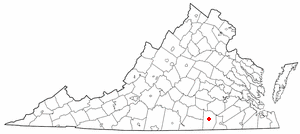
- Location of Lawrenceville, Virginia
- Coordinates: 36°45′30″N 77°51′2″W
- Country: United States
- State: Virginia
- County: Brunswick

Area
  - Total: 1.15 sq mi (2.98 km^{2})
  - Land: 1.15 sq mi (2.98 km^{2})
  - Water: 0 sq mi (0.00 km^{2})
- Elevation: 266 ft (81 m)

Population (2020)
  - Total: 1,014
  - Estimate: 1
  - Density: 881/sq mi (340/km^{2})
- Time zone: UTC−5 (Eastern (EST))
  - Summer (DST): UTC−4 (EDT)
- ZIP code: 23868
- Area code: 434
- FIPS code: 51-44520
- GNIS feature ID: 1498503
- Website: lawrencevilleweb.us

Lawrenceville is a town in Brunswick County, Virginia, United States. Per the 2020 census, the population was 1,014. Located by the Meherrin River, it is the county seat of Brunswick County. In colonial times, Lieutenant Governor Alexander Spotswood had a stockade built nearby, called Fort Christanna, where converted Native American allies were housed and educated.

Saint Paul's College, a historically black college affiliated with the Episcopal Church, was founded here in 1888. It operated until 2013.

Lumber, tobacco, livestock, and other farm products are grown in the area. In a county along the southern border of the state, the town is near the northernmost area for cotton growing.

== Geography ==
According to the United States Census Bureau, the town has a total area of 0.9 square mile (2.4 km^{2}), all land.

== Demographics ==
Historical population
Census	Pop.	Note	%±
1880	238		—
1890	305		28.2%
1900	760		149.2%
1910	1,733		128.0%
1920	1,439		−17.0%
1930	1,629		13.2%
1940	1,703		4.5%
1950	2,239		31.5%
1960	1,941		−13.3%
1970	1,636		−15.7%
1980	1,484		−9.3%
1990	1,486		0.1%
2000	1,275		−14.2%
2010	1,438		12.8%
2020	1,014		−29.5%
U.S. Decennial Census; 2010 2020

=== Racial and ethnic composition ===
Lawrenceville town, Virginia – Racial and ethnic composition Note: the US Census treats Hispanic/Latino as an ethnic category. This table excludes Latinos from the racial categories and assigns them to a separate category. Hispanics/Latinos may be of any race.
Race / Ethnicity (NH = Non-Hispanic)	Pop 2000	Pop 2010	Pop 2020	% 2000	% 2010	% 2020
White alone (NH)	422	282	204	33.10%	19.61%	20.12%
Black or African American alone (NH)	812	1,096	741	63.69%	76.22%	73.08%
Native American or Alaska Native alone (NH)	4	2	0	0.31%	0.14%	0.00%
Asian alone (NH)	3	8	6	0.24%	0.56%	0.59%
Native Hawaiian or Pacific Islander alone (NH)	0	1	0	0.00%	0.07%	0.00%
Other race alone (NH)	0	1	6	0.00%	0.07%	0.59%
Mixed race or Multiracial (NH)	16	22	34	1.25%	1.53%	3.35%
Hispanic or Latino (any race)	18	26	23	1.41%	1.81%	2.27%
Total	1,275	1,438	1,014	100.00%	100.00%	100.00%

=== 2000 census ===
As of the census of 2000, there were 1,275 people, 376 households, and 209 families living in the town. The population density was 1,391.1 people per square mile (535.1/km^{2}). There were 459 housing units at an average density of 500.8 per square mile (192.6/km^{2}). The racial makeup of the town was 33.25% White, 64.63% African American, 0.31% Native American, 0.24% Asian, and 1.57% from two or more races. Hispanic or Latino of any race were 1.41% of the population.

There were 376 households, out of which 24.5% had children under the age of 18 living with them, 35.1% were married couples living together, 13.8% had a female householder with no husband present, and 44.4% were non-families. 39.6% of all households were made up of individuals, and 21.3% had someone living alone who was 65 years of age or older. The average household size was 2.35 and the average family size was 3.16.

In the town, the population was spread out, with 17.3% under the age of 18, 33.2% from 18 to 24, 17.5% from 25 to 44, 18.2% from 45 to 64, and 13.8% who were 65 years of age or older. The median age was 25 years. For every 100 females, there were 76.6 males. For every 100 females aged 18 and over, there were 73.4 males.

The median income for a household in the town was $28,594, and the median income for a family was $41,875. Males had a median income of $31,583 versus $18,056 for females. The per capita income for the town was $12,353. About 12.7% of families and 21.8% of the population were below the poverty line, including 23.2% of those under age 18 and 18.8% of those age 65 or over.

== Government ==
The Town of Lawrenceville serves as the county seat for Brunswick County, Virginia. It operates under the council-manager form of government, in accordance with Title 15.2, Chapter 6 of the Code of Virginia.

== Notable people ==
- Duke Brett, former Major League Baseball pitcher
- James H. Coleman, Jr., retired justice of the New Jersey Supreme Court and first African American on the court.
- George Coke Dromgoole, politician (D-VA) represented Virginia in the United States House of Representatives; he was born in Lawrenceville.
- Thomas Emmerson, Tennessee judge and first mayor of Knoxville, Tennessee, was born here.
- E. Franklin Frazier, sociologist and author of the classic Black Bourgeoisie, taught at St. Paul's College.
- Albertis Harrison, state Governor from 1962 to 1966, was a native of Lawrenceville, where he practiced law.
- John Hartwell Marable, who represented Tennessee in the House of Representatives, was born here.
- David Nolan, author and historian, worked for the Virginia Students Civil Rights Committee (VSCRC) in Lawrenceville in the 1960s.
- Chandler Owen, co-editor, with A. Philip Randolph of The Messenger, attended St. Paul's College.
- Goronwy Owen (1723–1769), highly influential author of Welsh poetry in strict metre, Vicar of St Andrews Episcopal Church in Lawrenceville, and local cotton and tobacco planter
- Peter B. Starke, served as a Confederate States Army general in the American Civil War. Buried near Lawrenceville, where he owned a plantation.
- Bryant Stith, former University of Virginia and NBA basketball player.
