= 1780 New Jersey gubernatorial election =

- October 30, 1780
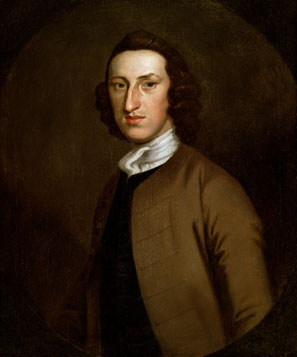

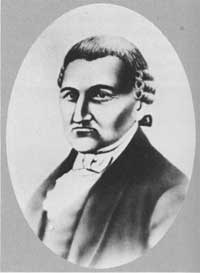

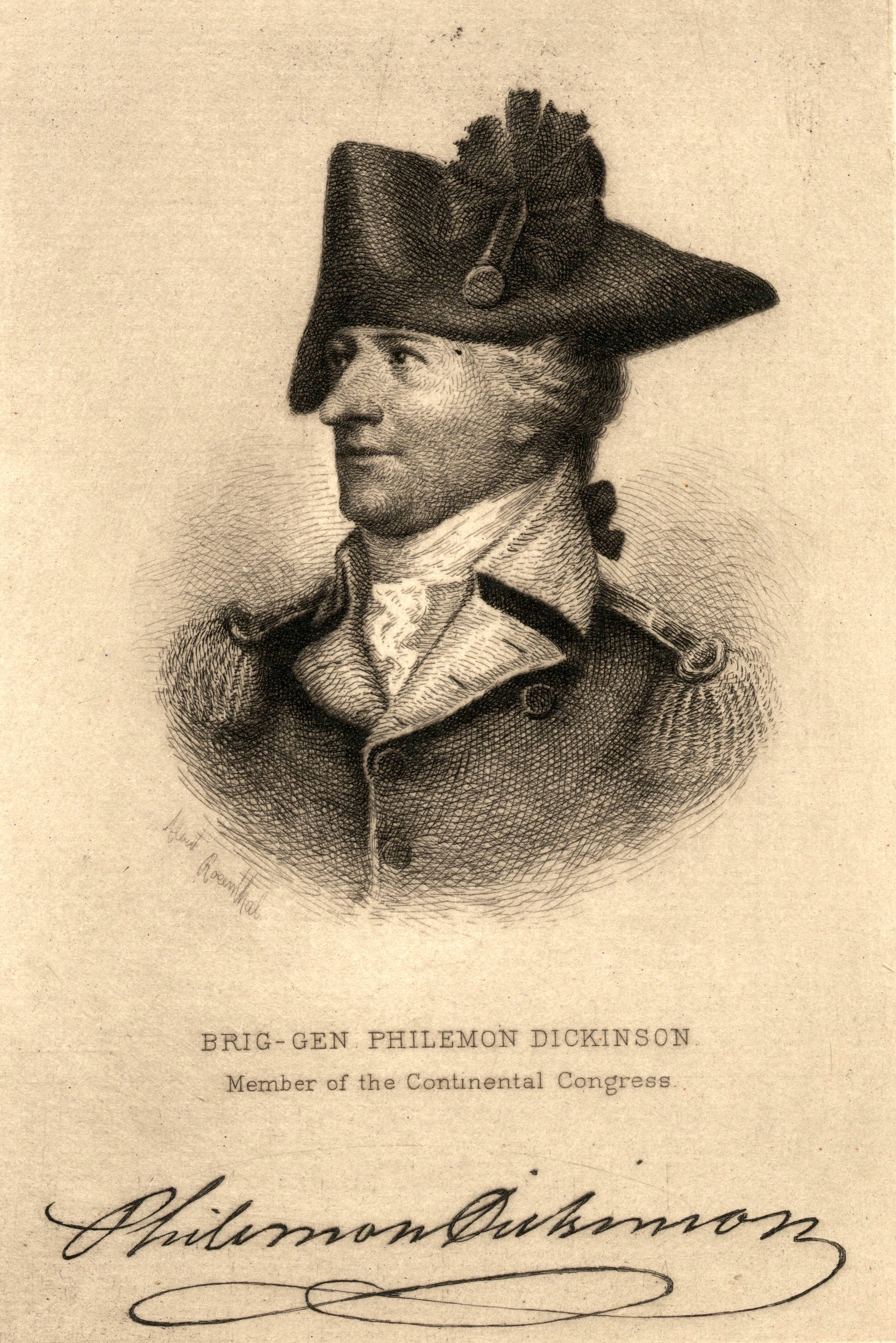
Nominee	William Livingston	David Brearley	Philemon Dickinson
Party	Nonpartisan	Nonpartisan	Nonpartisan
Popular vote	28	6	2
Percentage	77.78%	16.67%	5.55%
Governor before election
William Livingston
Nonpartisan
Elected Governor
William Livingston
Nonpartisan

The 1780 New Jersey gubernatorial election was held on October 30, 1780, in order to elect the Governor of New Jersey. Incumbent Governor William Livingston was re-elected by the New Jersey General Assembly against his opponents candidates David Brearley and Philemon Dickinson.

== General election ==
On election day, October 30, 1780, incumbent Governor William Livingston was re-elected by the New Jersey General Assembly by a margin of 22 votes against his foremost opponent candidate David Brearley. Livingston was sworn in for his fifth term that same day.

=== Results ===
New Jersey gubernatorial election, 1780
Party	Candidate	Votes	%
Nonpartisan	William Livingston (incumbent)	28	77.78%
Nonpartisan	David Brearley	6	16.67%
Nonpartisan	Philemon Dickinson	2	5.55%
Total votes		36	100.00%
Nonpartisan hold			
