= Fox Rothschild =

American law firm

Fox Rothschild LLP
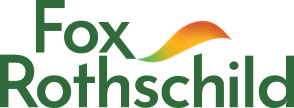
- Headquarters: Philadelphia, Pennsylvania
- No. of offices: 30
- No. of attorneys: 1,022
- Key people: Mark L. Morris, Co-Chair; Michael G. Menkowitz, Co-Chair; Todd A. Rodriguez, Firmwide Managing Partner
- Date founded: 1907; 119 years ago
- Company type: Limited liability partnership
- Website: foxrothschild.com

Fox Rothschild LLP (also known as Fox) is an American law firm founded in Philadelphia in 1907 by Edwin Fox and Jerome J. Rothschild.

As of April 2024, the firm operates from 30 offices across the United States, including larger markets such as New York City, San Francisco, Miami, and Washington, D.C., and smaller markets such as Las Vegas, Greensboro, and Denver.

== History ==
=== Founding (1907-1980) ===
Fox Rothschild was started on Chestnut Street in Philadelphia in 1907 by Edwin Fox and Jerome J. Rothschild. In 1932, the firm was named Fox Rothschild O'Brien and Frankel. In 1960, Fox merged with Speiser, Satinsky, Gilliland & Packel to expand to 25 attorneys. In 1986, Fox opened its first out-of-state office in Princeton, New Jersey. In the 1980s, Fox merged with two additional firms and expanded to 100 attorneys, including Peter Vaira who was the first former U.S. attorney to become partner.

=== 1980-2016 ===
From the 1980s to the 2010s, Fox merged with over 15 firms, adding practice areas such as tax & estates, intellectual property, patents, government contracts, healthcare, labor & employment, financial services, cannabis, gaming, and real estate.

=== 2016-present ===
On January 1, 2016, Fox Rothschild merged with Minneapolis law firm Oppenheimer Wolff & Donnelly. On September 20, 2018, Fox Rothschild announced its merger with Smith Moore Leatherwood adding 130 attorneys across six locations to the firm, expanding Fox Rothschild's footprint into the Southeast. In 2019, 15 attorneys from LeClair Ryan joined the firm, adding aviation law. In 2021, Fox merged with Greene Radovsky Maloney Share & Henneigh, adding 21 attorneys. In the 2020s, Fox opened three new offices in Oklahoma City, Oklahoma; Boston, Massachusetts; and Sarasota, Florida. In April 2020, Kelley B. Hodge, the first African American woman to serve as district attorney in the Commonwealth of Pennsylvania, joined as a partner in Fox's Philadelphia office.

==== Ranking ====
In 2025, Fox received a score of 95 out of 100 on the Human Rights Campaign Foundation's State of the Workplace for LGBTQ+ Americans and Corporate Equality Index which provides a research‑based snapshot of LGBTQ+ experiences in U.S. workplaces and a national benchmark of corporate policies, practices, and benefits pertinent to LGBTQ+ employees. In 2023, women comprised 30% of partners and 51% of associates, slightly higher than the law firm average of 28% and 50%, respectively, as reported by the American Bar Association.

==== Trump Georgia phone call ====
On January 2, 2021, during an hour-long conference call, U.S. president Donald Trump pressured Georgia secretary of state Brad Raffensperger to "find 11,780 votes" and overturn the U.S. election results from the 2020 presidential election. Fox Rothschild partner, Alex Kaufman, was present on the phone call. On January 7, 2021, Fox announced that Alex Kaufman and his father, partner Robert Kaufman, had left the law firm.

== Notable clients ==
Fox Rothschild has represented notable clients in the entertainment industry, such as Kobalt Music, BMG, Primary Wave, Stevie Wonder, Wu-Tang Clan, $uicideboy$, Raphael Saadiq, and Mötley Crüe.

== Notable partners and alumni ==
- Virginia Long (former justice of the New Jersey Supreme Court)
- Marc H. Simon (filmmaker)
- Kelley B. Hodge (District Judge and Former District Attorney)
- Gregory B. Williams (District judge)
- Roberto A. Rivera-Soto (former Associate Justice on the New Jersey Supreme Court)
- Patrick Murphy (Pennsylvania politician)
- Marcel Groen (Former Pennsylvania Democratic Party chairman)
- Michael Friedman (author)
- James L. Gale (former judge on North Carolina Business Court)
- Ferris W. Wharton (judge on the Delaware Superior Court)
