= State v. Kelly =

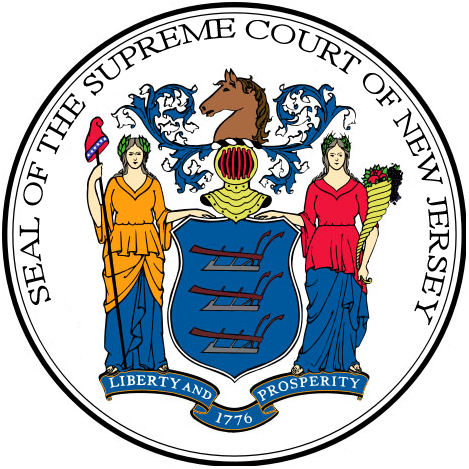
- Court: Supreme Court of New Jersey
- Full case name: State of New Jersey, Plaintiff-Respondent, v. Gladys Kelly, Defendant-Appellant
- Argued: May 10, 1983
- Decided: July 24, 1984
- Citations: 97 N.J. 178; 478 A.2d 364

Case history
- Prior actions: Certification granted, 91 N.J. 539, 453 A.2d 859 (1983).

Holding
- Defendant's use of expert witness testimony concerning battered woman syndrome to support a claim of self-defense in a murder case was valid and improperly excluded.

Court membership
- Chief Justice: Robert Wilentz
- Associate Justices: Robert L. Clifford, Sidney M. Schreiber, Alan B. Handler, Stewart G. Pollock, Daniel J. O'Hern, Marie L. Garibaldi

Case opinions
- Majority: Wilentz, joined by Clifford, Schreiber, Pollock, O'Hern, Garibaldi
- Concur/dissent: Handler

State v. Kelly, 97 N.J. 178; 478 A.2d 364 (1984), is a Supreme Court of New Jersey case where the defendant, Gladys Kelly, was on trial for the murder of her husband, Ernest Kelly with a pair of scissors. The Supreme Court reversed the case for further trial after finding that expert testimony regarding the defense's submission, that Kelly suffered from battered woman syndrome, was incorrectly excluded since battered woman syndrome was a proper subject for expert evidence. Kelly was represented by Charles S. Lorber who is now with Mandelbaum Salsburg of West Orange N.J.

== Implications ==
This is a notable case, both regarding the role of experts in new fields and in trials where the battered woman defense may be advanced, as is demonstrated by it being cited in other states, by universities, and by the US Government.

Further, it is cited as one of the notable opinions by Chief Justice Robert Wilentz.
