= Urban survival syndrome =

The urban survival syndrome, in United States jurisprudence, can be used either as a defense of justification or of excuse. The first case using, unsuccessfully, the defense of "urban survival syndrome" is the 1994 Fort Worth, Texas murder trial of Daimion Osby.

The use of the urban survival syndrome as a defense to criminal charges followed the success of the battered woman syndrome defense in State v. Kelly (1984), which was based on the acceptance that the presence of such a syndrome may cause the defendant, a victim of domestic violence, to reasonably believe she was in peril and was therefore justified in using deadly force, given the circumstances.

== Defense ==
As an excuse defense, the urban survival syndrome is presented as a version of the abuse defense. Here an individual experiencing the daily life of racial segregation and violence common in many inner cities in the United States causes a subjective state equivalent to that caused by survival in a violent battleground of war. As such it leads to a condition similar to a syndrome already recognized in both psychological and psychiatric practices, that is, post-traumatic stress disorder (PTSD).

As a justification defense, the urban survival syndrome is offered to bolster self-defense claims in which a defendant argues that he or she should not be held criminally responsible for actions which broke the law, as the defendant was objectively reasonable in believing his or her lethal actions were necessary for survival. In this case, the act would be termed justifiable homicide. A defense of justification is a codification of the common law defense of necessity.

== History ==
=== State v. Brown ===
In State v. Brown, 91 N.M. 320, 573, P.2d 675 (N.M. 1977), the court was dealing with a similar situation to that of Osby, and a justification defense was used. The term, urban survival syndrome, had not yet come into being. Brown, a black man living in an inner city neighborhood, was charged with two counts of assault with intent to kill upon a police officer. Brown said that he was in fear of the police officers and acted in self-defense when he shot them. The court allowed defense witnesses to describe the verbal and physical harassment of blacks by police officers, including Brown, although the court refused to allow a social psychologist to testify describing studies of police conduct toward minority groups, nor those that concluded that minority groups might perceive police officers as hostile to them and would be apt to fear them in any street encounter. These studies could offer evidence of justification. Brown was convicted and appealed.

The New Mexico Court of Appeals reversed the decision to exclude expert testimony and remanded the case back for a new trial. The court felt such testimony supported Brown in his claim that he was in fear of immediate bodily harm when he shot the police officers, rather than acting out of anger and rejection of authority, as the prosecution alleged. Therefore, evidence bearing on Brown's state of mind at the time of the offense had been excluded as a reversible error.

=== People v. Goetz ===
In People v. Goetz, 68 N.Y.2d 96 (N.Y. 1986), Bernhard Goetz, a white man, used the defense of a subjective state of terror and fear to justify the shooting of four black teenagers on a New York City subway. The court held that the test for whether the use of deadly force is justified should be entirely subjective and focus on the defendant's state of mind at the time of the incident and dismissed the criminal indictments of attempted murder, assault, and reckless endangerment. However, upon appeal the New York Court of Appeals, in a unanimous finding, held that the use of an entirely subjective test to determine the appropriateness of deadly physical force by a defendant could permit a jury to acquit every defendant who believed that his actions were reasonable, regardless of how bizarre the rationale, creating a slippery slope. The jury could determine a different reasonable test for every single defendant claiming justification. The Court explained that the justification statute requires an objective element; deadly physical force is only permissible if a reasonable person would believe that he is in imminent fear of serious physical injury or death.

== Osby trial ==
State v. Kelly (1984), by allowing testimony on battered woman syndrome, opened the door to considering the subjective state of the perpetrator as a pathological syndrome caused by environmental factors and allowing a defense on those grounds.

The term "urban survival syndrome" was first used in 1994 in a Fort Worth, Texas murder case in which two defense attorneys, David Bays and Bill Lane, defended Daimion Osby, their 17-year-old black client, who had shot and killed two unarmed men in a parking lot and was on trial on two counts of first degree murder. The victims were also black, and the defendant told the police he shot them because he was in fear for his life and had to kill them before they killed him. The attorneys argued that Osby had reason to be fearful because he lived in a dangerous community, an inner city neighborhood with one of the highest crime rates in the country. Expert testimony was allowed into evidence, provided by a sociologist, Jared Taylor, who had written on race relations and who produced statistics that the Fort Worth area where the crime took place was a dangerous area with a high crime rate, and that the two men who were killed fit the FBI profile of America's most dangerous men. Jared Taylor is identified by the Southern Poverty Law center as a white nationalist. He also testified that being killed is the greatest danger facing young men in such neighborhoods. Osby claimed that for the past year the two men had repeatedly harassed and threatened him and his family over the payment of a gambling debt. Evidence was also presented that the two men had a gun in their car.

Based on the testimony, the defense attorneys argued that the defendant's belief that he was in danger for his life was reasonable, and therefore he was justified in using lethal force. The jury of nine whites and three blacks deadlocked, eleven to one, in favor of conviction. The prosecutor was a black attorney who forcefully argued that there was no such syndrome in the field of psychiatry as "urban survival syndrome". The one holdout was a black man from the same neighborhood as Osby and who agreed that the area was a "war zone". Six jury members interviewed after the trial said they disregarded the defense as far-fetched. Further, a coalition of black ministers from Osby's neighborhood publicly disavowed that the neighborhood was so dangerous and complained that the defense reinforced racial stereotypes.

Upon retrial on the murder charges, the defense attempted to introduce testimony from a psychologist, in addition to that of the sociologist, on the psychological effects of living in a violent urban area. The psychologist's testimony was disallowed and Osby was convicted on the two murder counts and sentenced to serve life in prison.

== Criticisms ==
The "urban survival syndrome" has been criticized by black people as a stereotype as if all black people react in the same way: that as a group black people are violent, angry and more than likely guilty. This perspective demonstrated the flaw in any defense that depends on the rules and mores of a subculture as a replacement for those of the dominant society. Fort Worth minister Ralph Waldo Emerson stated:

[The Osby mistrial] says 'these folks' can't help shooting each other,... And it says to already nervous law-enforcement officials that they'd better be ready to draw when they stop someone in our community.

The battered woman syndrome has been criticized on similar grounds: that it encourages the societal stereotype of women as helpless and incapacitated. While the court testimony can support the woman's actions as reasonable under the circumstances as self-defense, the courts seem to focus on testimony that portray the battered woman as "dysfunctional". Further problems arise with this defense when an analogous syndrome, the "battered child syndrome" is used as a defense, as the unique susceptibility of a woman to domestic violence can seem to be undercut.

== See also ==
- Abuse defense
- Black rage
