= Rachel Wainer Apter =

American judge (born 1980)

Justice of the New Jersey Supreme Court
- Incumbent
- Assumed office October 21, 2022
- Appointed by: Phil Murphy
- Preceded by: Jaynee LaVecchia

Personal details
- Born: July 22, 1980 (age 45)
- Party: Democratic
- Education: University of Pennsylvania (BA); Harvard University (JD)

Rachel Wainer Apter (born July 22, 1980) is an American lawyer who serves as a justice of the Supreme Court of New Jersey.

== Early life and education ==
Wainer Apter grew up in Rockaway, New Jersey, where she attended Morris Hills High School. She graduated summa cum laude from the University of Pennsylvania and received her Juris Doctor magna cum laude from Harvard Law School, graduating in 2007.

== Career ==
After law school, Wainer Apter clerked for Judge Jed S. Rakoff of the United States District Court for the Southern District of New York, and then for Chief Judge Robert Katzmann of the United States Court of Appeals for the Second Circuit. She then went on to clerk for Associate Justice Ruth Bader Ginsburg of the Supreme Court of the United States. Wainer Apter then worked in the Supreme Court and Appellate Practice at Orrick, Herrington and Sutcliffe and as an attorney at the ACLU in New York. She then became counsel to the Attorney General of New Jersey and then director of the New Jersey Division on Civil Rights.

While working at the New Jersey Attorney General office, Wainer Apter led a team that sought to uphold the DACA program.

On March 15, 2021, Governor Phil Murphy nominated Wainer Apter to be a justice of the Supreme Court of New Jersey. She was nominated to replace the retiring Justice Jaynee LaVecchia. Her nomination expired in 2021 due to Senator Holly Schepisi refusing to give senatorial consent and blocking her nomination. In January 2022, Schepisi suggested she may be open to supporting Wainer Apter's nomination. On January 11, 2022, Governor Murphy renominated Wainer Apter. On October 13, 2022, her nomination was voted out of committee by an 8–3 vote, after Republicans voiced their concern over her time with her time as a director of the civil rights division of the New Jersey Attorney General's office and staff attorney for the ACLU. On October 17, 2022, her nomination was confirmed by a 23–14 vote. She was sworn into office on October 21, 2022.

== Personal life ==
A resident of Englewood, New Jersey, Wainer Apter and her husband have three children.

== See also ==
- List of law clerks for the sixth seat of the Supreme Court of the United States

Legal offices
Preceded by Jaynee LaVecchia	Justice of the Supreme Court of New Jersey; 2022–present	Incumbent
