= Abuse defense =

Criminal law defense

The abuse defense is a criminal law defense in which the defendant argues that a prior history of abuse justifies violent retaliation. While the term most often refers to instances of child abuse or sexual assault, it also refers more generally to any attempt by the defense to use a syndrome or societal condition to deflect responsibility away from the defendant. Sometimes the concept is referred to as the abuse excuse, in particular by the critics of the idea that guilty people may use past victimization to diminish the responsibility for their crimes.

When the abuser is the victim of the crime, as is often the case, the abuse defense is sometimes used as a way to "put the victim on trial".

The Supreme Court of the United States has held on numerous occasions that the defendant should be permitted to present any information that they feel might affect sentencing. Despite this legal precedent, the availability of the abuse defense has been criticized by several legal experts, particularly in the aftermath of the trials of Lorena Bobbitt and the Menendez brothers. Legal scholar Alan Dershowitz has described the abuse excuse as a "lawless invitation to vigilantism".

== Definition ==
The abuse defense is "the legal tactic by which criminal defendants claim a history of abuse as an excuse for violent retaliation". In some instances, such as the Bobbitt trial, the supposed abuse occurs shortly before the retaliative act; in such cases, the abuse excuse is raised as a means of claiming temporary insanity or the right of self-defense. In other trials, such as those of the Menéndez brothers, the supposed abuse occurs over a prolonged period of time, often beginning during the defendant's childhood; this relates the abuse defense to the concept of diminished capacity. Because the victim of the act is often the person who committed abuse against the defendant in the past, the goal of the abuse excuse is to "put the victim on trial" and show that the abuser "had it coming".

== Other responsibility deflection defenses ==
There are more than 40 distinct defenses and syndromes that have been employed by defense attorneys, all of which share the goal of deflecting responsibility for the crime away from the defendant. Some of these defenses seek to relate the defendant's behavior to previously existing medical conditions, such as antisocial personality disorder, fetal alcohol syndrome, and posttraumatic stress disorder. Other defenses seek to attribute the criminal act to the society in which the defendant lives rather than his or her own choices; the pornography defense asserts that the proliferation of pornography causes men to commit acts of sexual violence, and urban survival syndrome claims that violent conditions in a city or neighborhood may justify violent actions by a particular individual.

== Prevalence ==
A growing concern among the American public is that guilty criminals are too often excused for their crimes or are given unsuitably short sentences, a problem that is exacerbated by the use of the abuse defense. Legal experts counter that excuse defenses either serve an insignificant role in the trial or are entirely unsuccessful. During the trial of Dan White, who assassinated gay rights advocates George Moscone and Harvey Milk, one expert testimony mentioned that the consumption of large amounts of junk food may have intensified White's state of depression prior to the murders. It was widely reported that White's counsel had earned him a reduced sentence by employing the so-called "Twinkie defense", despite the fact that the subject of sugar intoxication was only briefly touched upon during the trial.

Although the American public often complains about the supposed frequency with which defendants use the abuse defense, the reality is that it is generally only used in high-profile cases. In order for the abuse defense to be employed effectively, it is necessary for the defense to produce expert testimony on the defendant's behalf. Most defendants are unable to pay for such testimony; as such, qualified experts tend to provide advocating testimony only in those cases in which the defendant is wealthy or is supported by public interest groups. The trials of Lorena Bobbitt and the Menéndez brothers were two high-profile cases that are often cited as examples of the abuse excuse in action.

=== Bobbitt trial ===
On June 23, 1993, Lorena Bobbitt cut off her husband's penis with a kitchen knife while he was sleeping. Afterward, she drove away and tossed the severed penis out the car window into a nearby field. Bobbitt later claimed that her husband had raped her immediately prior to the incident, though he denied these claims and was eventually acquitted of rape charges. Bobbitt also claimed that her husband had repeatedly raped and verbally abused her in the past, and that the memories of this abuse "raced through her head" in the moments prior to the attack on her husband. At her trial, Bobbitt's defense attorney argued that she was not guilty by reason of temporary insanity. She was acquitted by this reason and was released after being taken into custody for psychiatric evaluation. Legal critics argued that Bobbitt won her trial by means of the abuse defense.

=== Menendez brothers ===
In August 1989, brothers Lyle and Erik Menendez shot and killed their parents in their home in Beverly Hills, California. The two constructed an elaborate alibi and maintained their innocence until Erik confessed to his psychotherapist two months later. When it was decided that the murder confession could be used as evidence during their trials, the brothers entered pleas of self-defense. They claimed that they had been sexually abused by their father throughout childhood and that they feared their parents intended to murder them. Despite the judge's refusal to present the juries with self-defense instructions, the first trials both ended with hung juries and were declared mistrials. Although the brothers were eventually convicted and given consecutive life sentences, many legal experts were outraged by the mistrials.

== Legal precedent ==
The Supreme Court of the United States has held on numerous occasions that capital defendants have the right to present information about an abusive childhood as mitigating evidence. Prior to 1978, the capital statute of Ohio had placed limitations on what mitigating factors the defense could present during sentencing. However, this statute was invalidated by Lockett v. Ohio, in which Chief Justice Warren E. Burger proclaimed that the sentencer should not be "precluded from considering, as a mitigating factor, any aspect of a defendant's character or record and any of the circumstances of the offense that the defendant proffers as a basis for a sentence less than death." A similar conclusion was reached in the 1982 case Eddings v. Oklahoma, in which the Supreme Court held that United States law does not prevent a jury from considering a defendant's childhood abuse when determining the appropriate sentence.

In the June 2003 case Wiggins v. Smith, the petitioner Kevin Wiggins, who had been sentenced to death for murder, was granted habeas corpus because his attorney had failed to fully investigate or present mitigating evidence regarding Wiggins's childhood. Wiggins had been abused and neglected by his mother and was repeatedly raped while in foster care; the Supreme Court determined that there was a "reasonable probability" that such information would have altered the jury's sentencing, and that the attorney's failure to present this information violated Wiggins's Sixth Amendment right to counsel.

== Responses ==
Legal scholar Alan Dershowitz has argued that, while a prior history of victimization may be a contributing factor to a violent crime, victimization alone cannot fully explain an act of violence. The vast majority of those who have suffered abuse do not go on to kill their abuser, and there is no known correlation between severity of abuse and the "deadliness of the response". Dershowitz views the effectiveness of the abuse defense as a "lawless invitation to vigilantism" which will serve only to extend the cycle of violence.

Although political scientist James Q. Wilson has also denounced the abuse excuse, he points out that it is only effective if a jury finds it to be compelling evidence of innocence or a substantial mitigating factor. When this occurs, there is no reason to exclude claims of abuse from the trial proceedings. Wilson has argued that the problem lies not in the employment of excuses as legal defenses, but in the intermingling of social science, which seeks to explain human behavior, with criminal law, which seeks to judge behavior. Although many citizens advocate severe penalties as a means of reducing crime, a number of studies have shown that the juror's desire to realize that goal is often overridden by the inherent desire to understand the behavior that leads to crime.

== See also ==
- Battered woman syndrome
- Causality
- Contributory negligence
- Determinism
- Diminished responsibility
- Victim playing
