= Roberto A. Rivera-Soto =

American judge

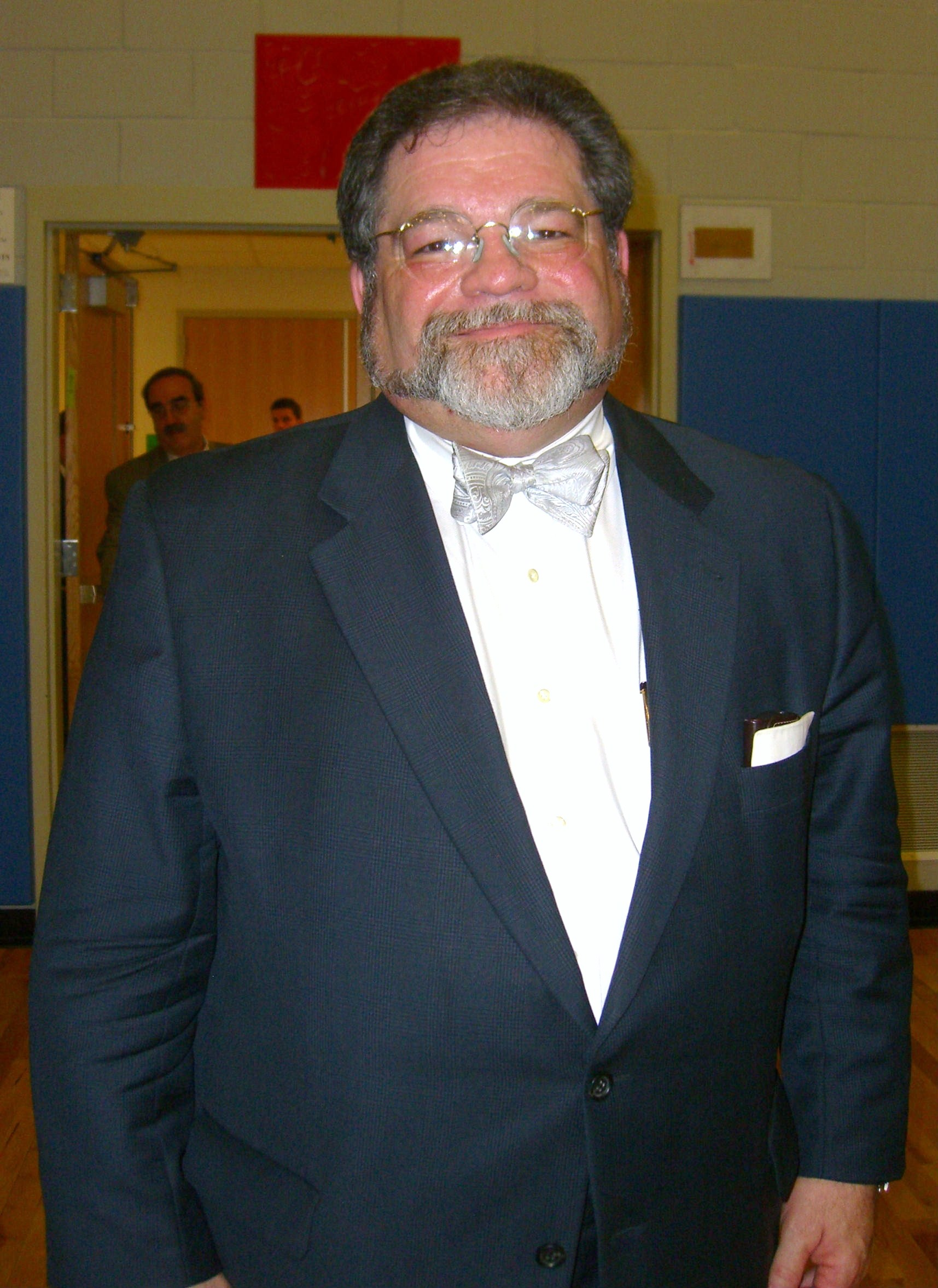
Justice Rivera-Soto at the inaugural commencement ceremony of Union City High School, where he gave the keynote address, June 23, 2010.

Roberto A. Rivera-Soto (born November 10, 1953) is a former Associate Justice on the Supreme Court of the State of New Jersey, U.S.A. His seven-year term expired on August 31, 2011, and he did not seek another term. Since leaving the court, he has resumed practicing law, as a partner with the Ballard Spahr law firm, in their Cherry Hill, New Jersey, office.

== Early life ==
Born in New York City but raised in Puerto Rico, Rivera-Soto graduated with high honors from the Colegio de Nuestra Señora del Pilar, Río Piedras, Puerto Rico in 1970. He graduated from Haverford College as the José Padín Scholar in 1974. At Cornell University School of Law, Rivera-Soto was a Charles K. Burdick Scholar and a member of the Moot Court Board. He received his J.D. from Cornell in 1977.

== Career ==
=== Business and legal activities ===
Rivera-Soto was a member of the Board of Directors of the "Please Touch Museum", a member of the Board of Directors of the New Jersey Development Authority for Small Businesses, Minorities and Women's Enterprises, an alternate member of the Southern Nevada Disciplinary Board of the State Bar of Nevada, and a former Instructor in Trial Advocacy at Rutgers School of Law—Newark.

He had previously served as senior vice president, general counsel and corporate secretary of Caesars World, and was also vice president, general counsel and corporate secretary of Greate Bay Hotel and Casino in Atlantic City. From 1980 to 1983, he was a litigation associate at Fox Rothschild.

From 1978 to 1980, he served as an Assistant United States Attorney in the Criminal Division of the United States Attorney's Office for the Eastern District of Pennsylvania. In 1977, Justice Rivera-Soto was an intern in the Office of the District Attorney of Delaware County, Pennsylvania. Justice Rivera-Soto is currently a Certified Mediator in the U.S. District Court for the District of New Jersey, member and the current chair of the District VII Ethics Committee of the Supreme Court of New Jersey.

Rivera-Soto's work as an Assistant United States Attorney was recognized by the Attorney General of the United States in 1980 when he received the United States Department of Justice's "Director's Award for Superior Performance as an Assistant United States Attorney". He also received commendations from the Federal Bureau of Investigation, the Bureau of Alcohol, Tobacco, Firearms and Explosives of the United States Treasury Department and the United States Customs Service.

When he was nominated, Justice Rivera-Soto was a partner at Fox Rothschild, with offices in Princeton, New Jersey and Philadelphia, Pennsylvania.

Justice Rivera-Soto was nominated by Governor James E. McGreevey on April 20, 2004 to serve on the Supreme Court. He was confirmed by the New Jersey Senate on June 10, 2004, and was sworn in as an associate justice by Justice Virginia Long on September 1, 2004 in a private ceremony. On September 14, 2004, he reaffirmed the oath of office in a public ceremony at the Trenton War Memorial.

=== Supreme Court service ===
The New Jersey Advisory Committee on Judicial Conduct filed a complaint against Justice Rivera-Soto, only the second time in its 33-year history that the Committee filed against a justice of the Supreme Court. The complaint alleged that Rivera-Soto used his influence as member of the Supreme Court to benefit his son in a dispute with his son and a classmate that escalated into a legal matter. Justice Rivera-Soto did not fight the complaint, and the Advisory Committee recommended that the Supreme Court censure the Justice for his actions. The New Jersey Supreme Court, with Justice Rivera-Soto not participating, accepted the report and recommendation of the Advisory Committee and censured the Justice. The censure, which is the second time the Court has censured a sitting member in more than thirty years, carried no suspension or reduction in pay, and ended the ethics matter.

On December 10, 2010, Rivera-Soto stated in an "abstaining opinion" in an otherwise non-controversial case that he would abstaining from voting on all Supreme Court decisions for an indefinite period due to his belief that the current Court membership violated the State Constitution. A majority of the Court responded in a concurring opinion that the makeup of the Court was constitutional. The dispute centered around the decision of Chief Justice Stuart Rabner in September 2010 to temporarily assign the Presiding Judge of the Appellate Division, Edwin Stern, to fill a long-term vacancy on the Supreme Court, which resulted from an ongoing stalemate between Republican Governor Chris Christie and the Democratic-controlled State Senate over an appointment to fill the vacancy. The New Jersey State Constitution authorizes the Chief Justice to make such temporary assignments when "necessary"; Rivera-Soto asserted that the temporary appointment was not "necessary" and was therefore unconstitutional. The president of the Senate called on Rivera-Soto to resign due to his announced intention to refrain from participating in Court decisions, as did the New York Times, saying that Rivera-Soto's move "appear[ed] to be driven by politics, not principle."

On January 3, 2011, Rivera-Soto sent a letter to Governor Christie indicating that he did not wish to be reappointed when his initial seven-year term on the Court expired in September 2011. On January 12, 2011, Rivera-Soto participated in a court decision and wrote an opinion indicating that he had reconsidered his position and would participate in future cases where Judge Stern's vote did not affect the outcome of the case.

On September 1, 2011, Justice Anne M. Patterson was sworn in to succeed Rivera-Soto.

=== Federal Court Appointment as a Special Master ===
Justice Rivera-Soto's abilities and experience also are acknowledged and recognized in our federal courts. On August 2, 2017, the Chief Judge of the U.S. District Court for the District of New Jersey appointed Justice Rivera-Soto as special master in a long-running case, Williams, et al. v. BASF Catalysts, LLC., et al., Civil Action No. 11-1754. As described by the United States Court of Appeals for the Third Circuit, the plaintiffs in Williams, a putative class action, allege that "BASF Catalysts LLC and Cahill Gordon & Reindel conspired to prevent thousands of asbestos-injury victims from obtaining fair tort recoveries for their injuries."

== Personal life ==
Rivera-Soto is married to the former Mary Catherine Mullaney; they have three sons, Adam, Christian and Nathan. They live in Haddonfield, New Jersey.

== Decisions ==
=== 2008-09 term ===
- Jen Electric, Inc. v. County of Essex
- Livsey v. Mercury Insurance Group
- McKesson Corp. v. Hackensack Medical Imaging
- Penn National Insurance Co. v. Costa
- Polzo v. County of Essex
- Real v. Radir Wheels, Inc.
- State v. Cassady
- State v. Kuchera

=== 2007-08 term ===
- IMO the Liquidation of Integrity Insurance Co.
- In re Port Authority of New York and New Jersey
- McMahon v. City of Newark
- Richard A. Pulaski Construction Co., Inc. v. Air Frame Hangars, Inc.
- Romagnola v. Gillespie, Inc.
- Sciarrotta v. Global Spectrum
- State v. Allegro
- State v. Buda
- State v. Dorman
- State v. Ingram
- State v. Kemp
- State v. Lykes
- State v. Nero
- State v. Ortiz
- State v. Sweet
- U.S. v. Scurry

=== 2006-07 term ===
- Carmona v. Resorts International Hotel, Inc.
- Daidone v. Buterick Bulkheading
- IMO Wilbur H. Mathesius, Judge of the Superior Court of New Jersey
- In re Supreme Court Advisory Committee on Professional Ethics Opinion No. 697
- Raspa v. Office of the Sheriff of the County of Gloucester
- R.M. v. Supreme Court of New Jersey
- Soto v. Scaringelli
- State v. Francis
- State v. Wakefield

=== 2005-06 term ===
- Aqua Beach Condominium Ass'n v. Department of Community Affairs
- Fitzgerald v. Tom Coddington Stables
- Infinity Broadcasting Corp. v. N.J. Meadowlands Commission
- Olivieri v. Y.M.F. Carpet, Inc.
- Ramapo River Reserve Homeowners Ass'n, Inc. v. Borough of Oakland
- State v. Bealor
- State v. Birkenmeier
- State v. Figueroa
- State v. G.C.
- State v. Mahoney
- State v. Molina

=== 2004-05 term ===
- Cherry Hill Manor Associates v. Faugno
- Coyne v. N.J. Department of Transportation
- DelaCruz v. Borough of Hillsdale
- IMO the Estate of Elizabeth Hull Vayda
- Municipal Council of the City of Newark v. James
- Shah v. Shah
- State v. Cummings
- State v. Hill
- State v. R.B.
- Steneken v. Steneken
- Szalontai v. Yazbo's Sports Cafe

== See also ==
- List of Puerto Ricans
