= Anne M. Patterson =

American judge (born 1959)

Anne Patterson

Justice of the New Jersey Supreme Court
- Incumbent
- Assumed office September 1, 2011
- Appointed by: Chris Christie
- Preceded by: Roberto Rivera-Soto

Personal details
- Born: April 15, 1959 (age 67) Trenton, New Jersey, U.S.
- Party: Republican
- Education: Dartmouth College (BA); Cornell University (JD)

Anne M. Patterson (born April 15, 1959) is a justice of the New Jersey Supreme Court. She was sworn in on September 1, 2011, replacing former Justice Roberto Rivera-Soto.

Patterson was born in Trenton, New Jersey on April 15, 1959, and raised in Hopewell Township and Princeton. In 1980, she graduated magna cum laude from Dartmouth College, where she was elected to Phi Beta Kappa. She is a 1983 graduate of Cornell Law School, where she won the Cuccia Cup moot court competition. She was admitted to the New Jersey Bar in 1983.

In 1983, Patterson joined the law firm of Riker, Danzig, Scherer, Hyland & Perretti LLP as an associate. In 1989, Patterson left Riker Danzig to serve as a deputy attorney general and special assistant to New Jersey Attorney General Peter N. Perretti, Jr., handling civil litigation and criminal appeals on behalf of the state. After rejoining Riker Danzig, Patterson became a partner in the firm in 1992. Her practice focused on product liability, intellectual property and commercial litigation in state and federal trial and appellate courts.

Patterson served as Chair of the New Jersey State Bar Association Product Liability and Toxic Tort Section, as an officer and trustee of the Association of the Federal Bar of New Jersey, and as a trustee of the Trial Attorneys of New Jersey. From 1991 to 2006, Patterson served on the New Jersey Supreme Court Committee on Character. Patterson was awarded the William A. Dreier Award for Excellence in the Advancement of Product Liability and Toxic Tort Law and the New Jersey Commission on Professionalism's Professional Lawyer of the Year Award. She was elected to the New Jersey Fellows of the America Bar Foundation in 2011.

Paterson has been a resident of Mendham Township, New Jersey.

In June 2018, she was re-nominated for a tenured position on the Supreme Court by Governor Phil Murphy.
