= David Brearley =

American Founding Father and judge

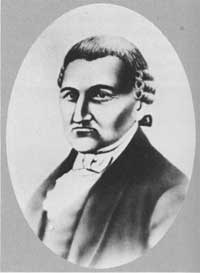

Judge of the United States District Court for the District of New Jersey
- In office September 26, 1789 – August 16, 1790
- Appointed by: George Washington
- Preceded by: Seat established by 1 Stat. 73
- Succeeded by: Robert Morris

Personal details
- Born: David Brearley Jr. June 11, 1745 Spring Grove, Maidenhead (now Lawrence Township), Hunterdon County, Province of New Jersey, British America
- Died: August 16, 1790 (aged 45) Trenton, New Jersey, U.S.
- Resting place: St. Michael's Church; Trenton, New Jersey
- Education: Princeton University read law

David Brearley Jr. (often misspelled as Brearly) (June 11, 1745 – August 16, 1790) was an American Founding Father, Chief Justice of the Supreme Court of New Jersey, a delegate from New Jersey to the Constitutional Convention of 1787, which drafted the United States Constitution, a signer of the United States Constitution, and a United States district judge of the United States District Court for the District of New Jersey.

== Education and career ==
Coat of Arms of David Brearley

Born on June 11, 1745, to Mary and David Brearely Sr. (1703–1785) in Lawrence Township, New Jersey, Province of New Jersey, British America, Brearley attended the College of New Jersey (now Princeton University) and read law. He was in private practice in Allentown, New Jersey until 1776.

=== Opposition to British colonial rule and military service ===
Prior to the start of the American Revolution, Brearley was on one occasion arrested for his opposition to the rule of the British Parliament but was freed by a mob. With the outbreak of the Revolutionary War, Brearley was at first a captain in the Monmouth County militia after having spent many years speaking out against the Parliamentary absolutism. He eventually rose to the rank of colonel in Nathaniel Heard's New Jersey militia brigade. From 1776 to 1779 he served in the New Jersey Line of the Continental Army, seeing action at Brandywine, Germantown, and Monmouth.

=== Chief Justice of the Supreme Court of New Jersey ===
Brearley was chief justice of the Supreme Court of New Jersey from 1779 to 1789. He decided on the famous Holmes v. Walton case where he ruled that the judiciary had the authority to declare whether laws were unconstitutional.

=== Constitutional Convention ===
While at the Constitutional Convention in 1787, Brearley was Chairman of the Committee on Postponed Parts, which played a substantial role in shaping the final document. The committee addressed questions related to the taxes, war-making, patents and copyrights, relations with Native American tribes, and Franklin's compromise to require money bills to originate in the House of Representatives. The biggest issue they addressed was the presidency, and the final compromise was written by James Madison with the committee's input. They adopted the earlier plan for choosing the president by the Electoral College and settled on the method of choosing the president if no candidate had an Electoral College majority, which many such as Madison thought would be "nineteen times out of twenty".

The committee also shortened the president's term from seven years to four years, freed him to seek re-election, and moved impeachment trials from the courts to the Senate. They also created the vice president, whose only role was to succeed the president and preside over the Senate. This also transferred important powers from the Senate to the president, who was given the power (which had been given to the senate by Rutledge's committee) to make treaties and appoint ambassadors. He ultimately signed the finished Constitution.

=== Federal judicial service ===
Brearley was nominated by President George Washington on September 25, 1789, to the United States District Court for the District of New Jersey, to a new seat authorized by 1 Stat. 73. He was confirmed by the United States Senate on September 25, 1789, and received his commission on September 26, 1789. His service terminated on August 16, 1790, due to his death in Trenton.

== Death ==
He is interred in the churchyard of Saint Michael's Episcopal Church in Trenton, and a cenotaph was placed there in 1924.

== Legacy ==
At the close of the Revolutionary War, Brearley became one of the founding members of the Society of the Cincinnati in the State of New Jersey and served as the state society's vice president from 1783 until his death in 1790. In 1789, he was elected to the American Philosophical Society.

David Brearley High School in Kenilworth, New Jersey was named in his honor. Brearly Street in Madison, Wisconsin, is named in his honor. Brearley Crescent in Waldwick, New Jersey, is named in his honor. Brearley Lodge No.2 Masonic Lodge in Bridgeton, New Jersey, founded in 1790 by James Giles, is named in his honor.

== Sources ==
- Biography
- From NARA
- Colonial Hall Biography

Legal offices
Preceded by Seat established by 1 Stat. 73	Judge of the United States District Court for the District of New Jersey; 1789–1790	Succeeded by Robert Morris
