= Holmes v. Walton =

New Jersey court case

- Court: Supreme Court of New Jersey
- Full case name: Holmes v. Walton and Ketcham
- Decided: September 7, 1780
- Citation: Unreported

Court membership
- Chief Justice: David Brearley
- Justices: Isaac Smith, John Cleves Symmes

Case opinions
- Decision by: Brearley

Holmes v. Walton was a case decided by the Supreme Court of New Jersey in 1780, thought to be the first decision in which an American court held a statute unconstitutional. It is considered a landmark in the American law of judicial review. In an apparently unreported opinion, Chief Justice David Brearley held that a conviction entered by a six-person jury under a 1775 statute was void, because the Constitution of New Jersey required a jury of twelve.

== Background ==
=== Seizure laws ===
On October 8, 1778, amid the American Revolutionary War, the New Jersey Legislature passed a law that made it "lawful for any person or persons whomsoever to seize and secure provisions, goods, wares and merchandize [sic] attempted to be carried or conveyed into or brought from within the lines or encampments or any place in the possession of the subjects or troops of the King of Great Britain". The goods and the people found with them were to be taken before a justice of the peace of the county. The law, sometimes known as one of the "Seizure Laws", was intended to prevent trade with the British.

The 1778 Seizure Law required the justice of the peace, on the request of either party, to empanel a jury according to a statute passed on February 11, 1775. The February 1775 law, intended for the adjudication of small claims, provided for a jury of only six men, and further stipulated, "that in every cause where a jury of six men give a verdict as aforesaid there shall be no appeal allowed".

=== Constitutional provisions ===
Juries were considered extremely important in early America. The first constitution of New Jersey, adopted in 1776, contained two separate provisions concerning juries and their composition.

Section 22 of the Constitution of New Jersey, adopted July 2, 1776, read as follows:

That the common law of England, as well as so much of the statute law as have been heretofore practiced in this colony shall still remain in force, until they shall be altered by a future law of the legislature; such parts only excepted as are repugnant to the rights and privileges contained in this Charter; and that the inestimable right of trial by jury shall remain confirmed as a part of the law of this colony, without repeal forever.

Section 23 of the Constitution provided as a part of the oath to be taken by each member of the legislature, that he will not assent to any law, vote, or proceeding to repeal or annul "that part of the twenty-second section respecting, the trial by jury".

Although it included these two provisions, the 1776 constitution did not include any specific language authorizing or prohibiting judicial review.

=== Other sources of law ===
In addition to custom and English common law, two documents from the early history of New Jersey may have been thought relevant to the decision in Holmes. The first, chapter 22 of the West Jersey Concessions and Agreements (1676/77), (Note: The date of the agreement is March 3, 1676 Old Style and March 3, 1677 New Style.) which was "not to be altered by the legislative authority", stated "[t]hat the trial of all causes, civil and criminal, shall be heard and decided by the verdict or judgment of twelve honest men of the neighbourhood". The second was a formal declaration of rights and privileges passed by the House of Representatives in East Jersey on March 13, 1699, which asserted that "all trials shall be by the verdict of twelve men".

Other acts of the assemblies in each of the two Jersey provinces before their union in 1702—including an act dated November 1681 in West Jersey and one dated March 1683 in East Jersey—suggest that the right to a trial before a jury of twelve men was regarded as fundamental.

== Trial ==
By virtue of the 1778 Seizure Law, Elisha Walton, a major in the colonial militia, seized goods from John Holmes and Solomon Ketcham. He charged Holmes and Ketcham with having brought them from within the lines of the enemy. The goods were valuable: they included between 700 and 800 yards of silk, between 400 and 500 yards of silk gauze, and several other items.

The case was tried before John Anderson, a justice of the peace in Monmouth County, on May 24, 1779, before a jury of six men. The jury found for Walton and judgment was given accordingly. While the suit was pending, the defendants had already applied to the Supreme Court then in session at Burlington, and the Chief Justice, Robert Morris, issued a writ of certiorari to Anderson, returnable at the next session of the Supreme Court to be held at Hillsborough on the first Tuesday of September.

Meanwhile, Morris resigned his seat on the bench and on June 10 David Brearley was appointed Chief Justice. The court opened at Hillsborough on September 7, 1779. On September 9, the court ordered that Holmes be argued on the Thursday of the next term.

== Appeal ==
On November 11, 1779, the case was argued before the Supreme Court sitting at Trenton. William Willcocks, attorney for the plaintiffs in error, argued that the decision below should be reversed, in part because "the jury sworn to try the above cause and on whose verdict judgment was entered, consisted of six men only, when by the Laws of the Land it should have consisted of twelve men". He made additional arguments to much the same effect.

A curia advisari vult was entered at the close of argument in the case. Judgment was finally entered on September 7, 1780, ten months after the case had been argued.

== Decision ==
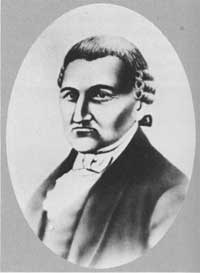
Chief Justice David Brearley, author of the opinion in Holmes v. Walton.

The Supreme Court of New Jersey issued its decision on September 7, 1780. A full bench was present, including Chief Justice David Brearley, Isaac Smith, and John Cleves Symmes. The opinion of the court has not been discovered. Scott suggests that it was probably delivered orally and never written down.

In his opinion, Brearley held that the trial of Holmes and Ketchum had not been constitutional, since it only featured a jury of six men. He did not reach the question of whether Holmes and Ketchum were innocent of trading with the enemy.

Brearley's holding can be inferred from a petition delivered in the New Jersey General Assembly on December 8, 1780, where "a petition from sixty inhabitants of the county of Monmouth was presented and read, complaining that the justices of the Supreme Court have set aside some of the laws as unconstitutional, and made void the proceedings of the magistrates, though strictly agreeable to the said laws, to the encouragement of the disaffected and great loss to the loyal citizens of the state and praying redress".

A message from Governor William Livingston to the assembly on June 7, 1782, also presumably refers to the decision in Holmes. Livingston argues:

... if an act of legislation can constitutionally be made, declaring that no person in whose possession any goods, wares or merchandise shall be seized and captured as effects illegally imported from the enemy, shall be entitled to such a writ ... if such an act, I say, should be passed it would probably encourage such seizures and give additional check to that most pernicious and detestable trade, the total suppression of which is one of the most important objects that can engage the attention of the legislature.

== Reaction ==
On the day after the argument before the Supreme Court, on November 12, 1779, Jonathan Deare, member of the Legislative Council for Middlesex, obtained leave to bring in a bill amending the "seizure acts".

This bill passed the council on December 6, 1779. We do not know what the provisions of the bill were, but we do know that the General Assembly attempted to amend it with a clause confirming the requirement of the six-man jury in past and pending cases. The council refused to accept this amendment.

The act that passed on December 25, 1779, provides in its preamble and first section as follows:

... and whereas causes of considerable value may ... be prosecuted before a justice of the peace wherein it may be prudent to have the judgment of a greater number than six jurors; be it enacted ... that in all causes hereafter to be prosecuted before any justice of the peace, by virtue of this or the said recited acts, it shall and may be lawful for either of the parties in such suit to demand a jury of twelve men, which jury such justice is hereby empowered to grant and to issue a venire accordingly.

Shortly thereafter, the New Jersey legislature passed a law which required the justice on the demand of either party in such suits to grant a jury of twelve men, and ordered the act to be printed in the Gazette newspaper and extra copies to be printed. In 1785, Gouverneur Morris argued before the Pennsylvania legislature against passage of a law to repeal the charter of the Bank of North America. In that speech he says:

A law was once passed in New Jersey, which the judges pronounced unconstitutional, and therefore void. Surely no good citizen can wish to see this point decided in the tribunals of Pennsylvania. Such power in judges is dangerous; but unless it somewhere exists, the time employed in framing a bill of rights and form of government was merely thrown away.

In 1804, Chief Justice Kirkpatrick of the Supreme Court of New Jersey noted Holmes in State v. Parkhurst:

This question [of whether a court can declare a legislative act unconstitutional] was brought forward in the case of Holmes v. Walton, arising on what was then called the seizure laws. There it had been enacted that the trial should be by a jury of six men; and it was objected that this was not a constitutional jury; and so it was held; and the act upon solemn argument was adjudged to be unconstitutional and in that case inoperative. And upon this decision the act, or at least that part of it which relates to the six-man jury, was repealed and a constitutional jury of twelve men substituted in its place. This then is not only a judicial decision but a decision recognized and acquiesced in by the legislative body of the State.

== Impact ==
Although Holmes was decided in 1780, and is thus likely the first state decision to hold a statute unconstitutional, its historical impact on the development of the law of judicial review is probably less than that of Trevett v. Weeden (1786), a Rhode Island case decided six years later.

== See also ==
- Marbury v. Madison

== Sources ==
- Corwin, Edward Samuel (December 1910). "The Establishment of Judicial Review (I)". Michigan Law Review. 9 (2): 102–125. doi:10.2307/1276638. JSTOR 1276638.
- Corwin, Edward Samuel (April 1925). "The Progress of Constitutional Theory Between the Declaration of Independence and the Meeting of the Philadelphia Convention". The American Historical Review. 30 (3): 511–536. doi:10.2307/1835579. JSTOR 1835579.
- Hamburger, Philip (June 30, 2009). Law and Judicial Duty. Cambridge, Massachusetts: Harvard University Press. ISBN 978-0-674-03819-6.
- Scott, Austin Wakeman (1899). "Holmes vs. Walton: The New Jersey Precedent". The American Historical Review. 4 (3): 456–469. doi:10.2307/1833432. JSTOR 1833432.
