= Virginia Long =

American judge (born 1942)

Justice of the New Jersey Supreme Court
- In office September 1, 1999 – March 1, 2012
- Nominated by: Christine Todd Whitman
- Preceded by: Alan B. Handler
- Succeeded by: Lee Solomon

Judge of the New Jersey Superior Court, Appellate Division
- In office June 29, 1983 – September 1, 1999
- Appointed by: Robert N. Wilentz

Judge of the New Jersey Superior Court
- In office February 16, 1978 – June 29, 1983
- Nominated by: Brendan T. Byrne

Personal details
- Born: March 1, 1942 (age 84)
- Spouse: Jonathan D. Weiner
- Children: 3
- Education: Dunbarton College of the Holy Cross (BA); Rutgers School of Law–Newark (JD)

Virginia Long (born March 1, 1942) is a former justice of the New Jersey Supreme Court. She is currently Counsel in the Princeton, N.J. office of Fox Rothschild.

== Biography ==
Born and raised in Elizabeth, New Jersey, Long graduated from Benedictine Academy in 1959, and from Dunbarton College of the Holy Cross in 1963.

She graduated from Rutgers School of Law—Newark in 1966 and has served as a Deputy Attorney General and was the Director of the New Jersey Division of Consumer Affairs and Commissioner of the New Jersey Department of Banking. She was appointed to the New Jersey Superior Court in 1978, and was elevated to the Appellate Division in 1984.

Justice Long became a presiding judge in 1995. She was nominated by Governor Christine Todd Whitman on June 17, 1999, to serve on the New Jersey Supreme Court. Her position was confirmed by the New Jersey Senate on June 21, 1999, and was sworn in on September 1, 1999. On June 21, 2006, the state Senate granted her tenure following the initial seven years. She retired from the New Jersey Supreme Court on March 1, 2012, and was subsequently appointed chair of the NJ Advisory Committee on Judicial Conduct. In 2018, she was appointed by New Jersey Governor Phil Murphy as a member of the Judicial Advisory Panel, and has been additionally appointed in 2022 by the Supreme Court of New Jersey to chair the newly created Committee to Analyze Duration of Disbarment. She has been of counsel at Fox Rothschild of Philadelphia and Princeton, New Jersey.

== Personal life ==
Long is married to Jonathan D. Weiner, a partner at Fox Rothschild, and has three children, Bernardita, John, and Jane.
