= Marie L. Garibaldi =

American judge (1934–2016)

Marie Garibaldi

Associate Justice of the New Jersey Supreme Court
- In office November 17, 1982 – 2000
- Appointed by: Thomas Kean
- Preceded by: Morris Pashman
- Succeeded by: Jaynee LaVecchia

Personal details
- Born: November 26, 1934 Jersey City, New Jersey, U.S.
- Died: January 15, 2016 (aged 81)
- Education: Connecticut College (BA); Columbia University (LLB); New York University (LLM)

Marie Louise Garibaldi (November 26, 1934 – January 15, 2016) was a United States Associate Justice of the New Jersey Supreme Court. When appointed by Governor Thomas Kean in 1982, Garibaldi became the first woman to serve on New Jersey's highest court. She retired in 2000.

== Biography ==
Born in Jersey City, New Jersey, Garibaldi was a resident of Weehawken, New Jersey. She attended Stevens Hoboken Academy. A 1956 graduate of Connecticut College, she received her LL.B. from Columbia University in 1959 and her LL.M. in tax law from New York University School of Law in 1963. Garibaldi became a member of the New York bar in 1960 and of the New Jersey bar in 1966. She is also admitted to the bar of the District of Columbia.

In 1968 and 1969, Garibaldi chaired the Weehawken Charter Commission and was a judge of that town's municipal court from 1973 to 1975.

At the time of her appointment to the Supreme Court, Garibaldi was a partner in the law firm of Riker, Danzig, Scherer, Hyland & Perretti. In addition to being the first woman on the Supreme Court, she also was the first woman to serve as President of the New Jersey State Bar Association.

She authored more than 225 opinions while on the Supreme Court and was known for her advocacy of complementary dispute resolution. Complementary dispute resolution, or CDR, programs allow a case to be resolved without a formal trial. As of 2023, about 98% of civil cases in New Jersey do not go to trial and are resolved through a CDR program instead. Garibaldi chaired the Supreme Court's committee on that subject, and, in 1998, the American Inns of Court Foundation established the Justice Marie L. Garibaldi American Inn of Court for Alternative Dispute Resolution.

Garibaldi also served as a director of the State Chamber of Commerce, New Jersey Bell Telephone Co., and the Washington Savings Bank. She also has been a trustee of St. Peter's College.

In 2010, Garibaldi was one of eight retired New Jersey Supreme Court Justices who issued a joint statement asking Governor Chris Christie to reconsider his decision not to re-appoint then-Justice John Wallace. She died on January 15, 2016, at the age of 82.

== See also ==
- List of female state supreme court justices
