= Robert Wilentz =

American judge (1927–1996)

Chief Justice of the Supreme Court of New Jersey
- In office August 10, 1979 – July 1, 1996
- Appointed by: Brendan Byrne; Thomas Kean
- Preceded by: Richard J. Hughes
- Succeeded by: Deborah T. Poritz

Member of the New Jersey General Assembly from the 7th district
- In office January 11, 1966 – January 13, 1970
- Preceded by: J. Edward Crabiel
- Succeeded by: Thomas J. Deverin

Personal details
- Born: Robert Nathan Wilentz; February 17, 1927 Perth Amboy, New Jersey, United States
- Died: July 23, 1996 (aged 69) New York, New York, United States
- Party: Democratic
- Spouse: Jacqueline Malino (m. 1949; died 1989)
- Children: 3, including Amy
- Parent: David T. Wilentz (father)
- Education: Harvard College (AB); Columbia Law School (LLB)
- Occupation: Lawyer; judge; politician

Robert Nathan Wilentz (February 17, 1927 – July 23, 1996) was Chief Justice of the New Jersey Supreme Court from 1979 to 1996, making him the longest-serving Chief Justice since the Supreme Court became New Jersey's highest court in 2015

== Early life ==
Robert Wilentz was born on February 17, 1927, in Perth Amboy, New Jersey, to David and Lena Wilentz. During Robert's childhood, his father was Attorney General of New Jersey, in which role he prosecuted Bruno Hauptmann for the kidnapping and murder of Charles Lindbergh Jr., one of the highest profile criminal cases in American history. David Wilentz was also a powerful political boss in Middlesex County.

Wilentz graduated from Perth Amboy High School, where he was valedictorian. He first enrolled at Princeton University, but left school to serve in the United States Navy. After completing two years of service, he graduated from Harvard University.

After Harvard, Wilentz received his law degree from Columbia Law School, where he was named a Harlan Fiske Scholar and won the Robert Noxon Toppan Prize in Constitutional Law.

== State politics ==
He was elected to the New Jersey General Assembly in 1965 and 1967 but chose not to seek a third term in 1969.

He considered a campaign for Governor of New Jersey in the 1973 election, but ultimately decided against it.

== Chief Justice of New Jersey ==
Wilentz was appointed Chief Justice by Democratic Governor Brendan Byrne in 1979.

Apart from his jurisprudence, Wilentz openly sought to use the structural role of Chief Justice to expand access to New Jersey courts. In 1982, he convened a commission to study the treatment of women in the New Jersey court system, both as lawyers and parties. He instructed judges to record observations of bias and take courses on bias. In that same year, he personally ordered a reorganization of the state's trial court system, reducing the number of Superior Court districts from 15 to 12 and redrawing their boundaries.

In 1986, was reappointed as chief justice in 1986 by Republican Governor Thomas Kean, but there was a confirmation battle in the New Jersey Senate. After a contentious debate that involved charges of judicial activism and criticism of Wilentz's residence in Manhattan, where his wife was undergoing treatment for cancer, the Chief Justice was confirmed for a second term by a vote of 21 to 19. Had he been rejected, his would have been the first such denial under New Jersey's 1947 Constitution.

=== Mount Laurel II ===
Perhaps the most notable opinion Wilentz authored as Chief Justice was Southern Burlington County NAACP v. Township of Mount Laurel, 92 N.J. 158 (1983). This case was a follow-up to a 1975 decision by the same name (commonly referred to as Mount Laurel I or simply Mount Laurel), which established that exclusionary zoning practices aimed at low-income, affordable, or single-family housing were a violation of the New Jersey Constitution. Mount Laurel I held that municipalities must afford realistic opportunity for the construction of low-income housing. In Mount Laurel II, Chief Justice Wilentz found that towns must take affirmative action to construct low-income housing, through subsidies, tax breaks, and a presumption of approval for building plans. Wilentz instructed the lower courts to come up with firm, quantifiable targets for every municipality in the state. (Note: In a footnote, Wilentz added that 20 percent affordable housing was a "reasonable minimum" for a municipality.) Among Wilentz's proposed judicial remedies in Mount Laurel II was the so-called "builder’s remedy": if a municipality did not have a realistic, implementable plan to meet the Mount Laurel requirements, a builder could sue to have courts override the local government and directly grant zoning approval.

The Mount Laurel II holding was eventually enforced by a legislative compromise, though supporters of the Court's decision thought the compromise was weak.

=== State v. Kelly ===
Wilentz's opinion in State v. Kelly, 91 N.J. 178 (1984), remains a landmark ruling in criminal law. The defendant, Gladys Kelly, was on trial for the murder of her husband, Ernest Kelly with a pair of scissors. Kelly presented a defense relying on expert testimony that Kelly suffered from battered woman syndrome, which the trial court excluded as an improper subject for expert evidence. Wilentz ruled that the expert testimony on the matter was appropriate and therefore admissible and remanded the case for further proceedings. The case opened the door for such defenses in New Jersey courts, and they have been subsequently admitted in other states.

=== Other notable opinions ===
- In re Baby M (1988), was the first court ruling on the validity of surrogacy. The biological mother in this case sought to retain custody of her biological child, in violation of a surrogacy contract. Writing for a unanimous Court, Wilentz invalidated the surrogacy contract as void for reasons public policy. In a dictum, the Court held that a common "best interests" analysis should apply to determine the child's eventual home.

== Personal life ==
Wilentz married Jacqueline Malino (1928 – March 29, 1989) in 1949 and they had three children, James Robert, Amy and Thomas.

== Retirement and death ==
A resident of Manhattan and Deal, New Jersey, Wilentz retired from the bench on July 1, 1996, due to advanced cancer. He died three weeks later on July 23, 1996. He would have reached the mandatory retirement age of 70 in February 1997.

== See also ==
- List of Jewish American jurists

== Notes ==
New Jersey General Assembly
Preceded by J. Edward Crabiel	Member of the New Jersey General Assembly from the 7th district 1966–1970	Succeeded by Thomas J. Deverin
Legal offices
Preceded by Richard J. Hughes	Chief Justice of the Supreme Court of New Jersey; 1979–1996	Succeeded by Deborah T. Poritz
