= Robert L. Clifford =

American judge

Associate Justice of the Supreme Court of New Jersey
- In office 1973 – December 1994

Personal details
- Born: December 17, 1924 Passaic, New Jersey, U.S.
- Died: November 29, 2014 (aged 89) Chester Township, New Jersey, U.S.
- Education: Montclair Academy; Lehigh University; Duke University School of Law (LLB)
- Profession: Judge

Robert L. Clifford (December 17, 1924 – November 29, 2014) was an associate justice of the New Jersey Supreme Court.

He was born in 1924 in Passaic, New Jersey, and attended Montclair Academy, graduating in the class of 1942. He received a Bachelor's degree from Lehigh University and an LL.B. from the Duke University School of Law in 1950. In 1973 he was appointed by Governor William T. Cahill to the Supreme Court of New Jersey, where he served until his retirement in December 1994. After retiring from the bench, he was counsel to the firm McElroy, Deutsch, Mulvaney & Carpenter LLP in Morristown, New Jersey. He died in his sleep at his home in Chester Township, New Jersey, on November 29, 2014. He was 89.
