= Jaynee LaVecchia =

American judge (born 1954)

Associate Justice of the New Jersey Supreme Court
- In office February 1, 2000 – December 31, 2021
- Appointed by: Christine Todd Whitman
- Preceded by: Marie L. Garibaldi
- Succeeded by: Rachel Wainer Apter

Commissioner of the New Jersey Department of Banking and Insurance
- In office August 24, 1998 – January 18, 2000
- Appointed by: Christine Todd Whitman
- Preceded by: Elizabeth Randall
- Succeeded by: Karen L. Suter

Personal details
- Born: October 9, 1954 (age 72) Paterson, New Jersey
- Party: Independent
- Spouse: Michael R. Cole (d. 2011)
- Education: Rutgers University (BA, JD)

Jaynee LaVecchia (born October 9, 1954) is a former associate justice of the Supreme Court of New Jersey. She was nominated by Governor Christine Todd Whitman to serve on the court on January 6, 2000 and was confirmed by the New Jersey Senate on January 10, 2000. In 2007, she was reappointed with tenure by Governor Jon Corzine. Although she could have served until reaching the mandatory retirement age in 2024, LaVecchia retired from the Court effective December 31, 2021.

== Biography ==
Jaynee LaVecchia was born in Paterson, New Jersey on October 9, 1954. She is a 1976 graduate of Douglass College and graduated in 1979 from Rutgers School of Law – Newark. She has been a member of the New Jersey State Bar Association since 1980. She was in private practice and worked as Director of the Division of Law within the Department of Law and Public Safety since August 1, 1984. As director, she was responsible for the legal work of all lawyers assigned to the civil side of the New Jersey Attorney ’s Office.

LaVecchia served in the Office of Counsel to Republican governor Thomas Kean from 1986 to 1989, first as an Assistant Counsel and then as Deputy Chief Counsel. She was Director and Chief Administrative Law Judge for the Office of Administrative Law from 1989 through July 1994. In 1996, she was elected a Fellow of the American Bar Association. On August 24, 1998, LaVecchia became commissioner of the New Jersey Department of Banking and Insurance.

LaVecchia was nominated by Governor Christine Todd Whitman to serve on the Supreme Court on December 24, 1999. She was confirmed by the Senate on January 10, 2000 and sworn in for a term to begin February 1, 2000. She replaced Marie L. Garibaldi. Governor Jon Corzine reappointed her to the New Jersey Supreme Court in 2006. She has chaired or served on various Supreme Court Committees, subcommittees, and other Court-assigned projects. She has been granted tenure until October 9, 2024.

In August 2020, LaVecchia wrote for the dissenters when a narrow majority found that the constitutional right against self-incrimination did not prevent a police officer from being compelled to provide the passcodes to iPhones he was accused of using to provide tip-offs to a drug trafficker.

== Decisions ==
=== 2008–09 Term ===
- Education Law Center v. N.J. Department of Education
- IMO Civil Commitment of J.M.B.
- Piermount Iron Works, Inc. v. Evanston Insurance Co.
- State v. Reeds
- State v. Smith

=== 2007–08 Term ===
- Board of Education of the City of Sea Isle City v. Kennedy
- Cutler v. Dorn
- Godfrey v. Princeton Theological Seminary
- Hunterdon Medical Center v. Twp. of Readington
- In re Application of Virtua-West Jersey Hospital Voorhees for a Certificate of Need
- Jablonowska v. Suther
- Rutgers Casualty Insurance Co. v. LaCroix
- State v. Burr
- State v. Hamilton
- State v. Wilder
- Tarr v. Bob Ciasulli's Mack Auto Mall, Inc.

=== 2006–07 Term ===
- D'Annunzio v. Prudential Insurance Co.
- Davidson v. Slater
- IMO Tammy Herrmann
- Phillips v. Gelpke
- State v. Dispoto
- State v. Fleischman
- State v. Romero
- State v. Williams – Evidence suggesting Jayson Williams' consciousness of guilt in shooting death of Gus Christofi was admissible at trial.
- Stomel v. City of Camden

=== 2005–06 Term ===
- Delta Funding Corp. v. Harris
- In re NJPDES Permit No. NJ0025241
- Gazis v. Miller
- Muhammad v. County Bank of Rehoboth Beach, Delaware
- Olivo v. Owens-Illinois, Inc.
- State v. Boretsky
- State v. Chapland
- State v. Pierce
- State v. Thomas
- State v. Nesbitt
- Thomsen v. Mercer-Charles

=== 2004–05 Term ===
- DKM Residential Properties Corp. v. Township of Montgomery
- Gerety v. Atlantic City Hilton Casino
- Hennessey v. Winslow Township
- H.K. v. N.J. Department of Human Services
- Pinto v. N.J. Manufacturers Insurance Co.
- Shankman v. State
- State v. Benthall
- State v. B.H.
- State v. Brennan
- State v. Harris
- State v. Johnson
- Thiedemann v. Mercedes-Benz, U.S.A., LCC
- Township of Monroe v. Gasko
- Yurick v. State

=== 2003–04 Term ===
- Camden Bd. of Education v. Alexander
- Galvao v. G.R. Robert Construction Co.
- N.J. Manufacturers Insurance Co. v. Hardy
- State v. Banko
- State v. Brannon
- State v. Cassidy
- State v. Cook
- State v. Negran
- State v. Pena
- State v. P.H.
- State v. Reiner
- Varsolona v. Breen Capital Services Corp.
- Weishaus v. Weishaus

=== 2002–03 Term ===
- D.L. Real Estate Holdings, LLC v. Point Pleasant Beach Planning Board
- McCurrie v. Town of Kearny
- McDevitt v. Bill Good Builders
- Nisivoccia v. Glass Gardens, Inc.
- Palisades Safety & Insurance Association v. Bastien
- Silvestri v. Optus Software, Inc.
- State v. Pelham
- State in the Interest of S.G.
- Warren County Community College v. Warren County Board of Chosen Freeholders

=== 2001–02 Term ===
- County of Camden v. Public Employees Retirement System
- Erny v. Estate of Antoinette T. Merola
- Gaines v. Bellino
- Howard v. University of Medicine & Dentistry of N.J.
- IMO the Commitment of W.Z.
- Martindale v. Sandvik, Inc.
- Merlino v. Borough of Midland Park
- Shelcusky v. Garjulio
- State v. Allah
- State v. Josephs
- State v. McCloud
- State v. Joel Williams
- State v. Edmond Williams
- Weinberg v. Sprint Corp.

=== 2000–01 Term ===
- Fink v. Thompson
- IMO Registrant J.M.
- IMO Registrant M.F.
- Lamorte Burns & Co., Inc. v. Walters
- McGrogan v. Till
- Pheasant Bridge Corp. v. Twp of Warren
- Riding v. Towne Mills Craft Centre, Inc.
- State in the Interest of T.M.
- Schick v. Ferolito
- State v. Fowlkes
- State v. Hackett
- State v. R.D.
- State v. Whaley
- Wilson v. Amerada Hess Corp.

=== 1999–2000 Term ===
- Crews v. Crews
- IMO the Grant of the Charter School Application of Englewood on the Palisades Charter School
- James v. Public Employees' Retirement System
- Kaufman v. i-Stat Corp.
- State v. Harris

Legal offices
Preceded by Marie L. Garibaldi	Associate Justice of the New Jersey Supreme Court; 2000–2021	Succeeded by Rachel Wainer Apter
