= Alan B. Handler =

American judge (1931–2024)

Alan Brodkin Handler (July 20, 1931 – May 23, 2024) was an American judge who served as a New Jersey Supreme Court Justice from 1977 until 1999.

== Early life ==
Handler was born in Newark, New Jersey, on July 20, 1931. He attended Newark Academy and then Princeton University, graduating with a B.A. degree from the Woodrow Wilson School of Public and International Affairs in 1953. After receiving an LL.B. degree from Harvard Law School in 1956, he entered private legal practice in Newark.

== Career ==
Handler served in the Office of the New Jersey Attorney General as First Assistant Attorney General from 1961 until 1964 and as First Assistant Attorney General from 1964 to 1968. He was appointed to the New Jersey Superior Court in 1968 by Governor Richard J. Hughes. He was assigned to the Appellate Division in 1973.

In 1976 he resigned from the bench to serve as counsel to Governor Brendan Byrne. In March 1977, he was appointed Associate Justice of the New Jersey Supreme Court.

Handler retired from the court in September 1999. He went on to serve Of Counsel at the Woodbridge, New Jersey, firm Wilentz, Goldman & Spitzer until 2016.

== Personal life and death ==
Handler lived in Delaware Township, Hunterdon County, New Jersey, and was predeceased by his wife, the former Rose Marie Kudroch, in 2011. He had three daughters.

Handler died on May 23, 2024, at the age of 92.
