= Supreme Court of New Jersey =

Highest court in the U.S. state of New Jersey

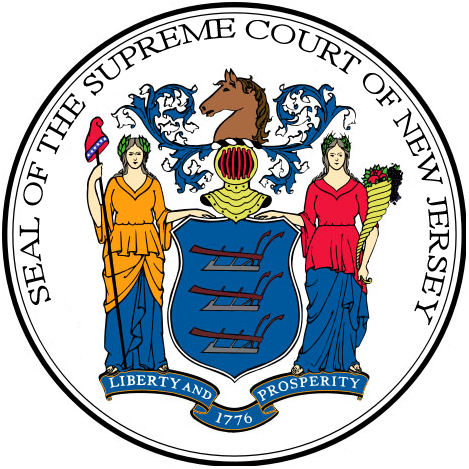
- Seal of the Supreme Court of New Jersey

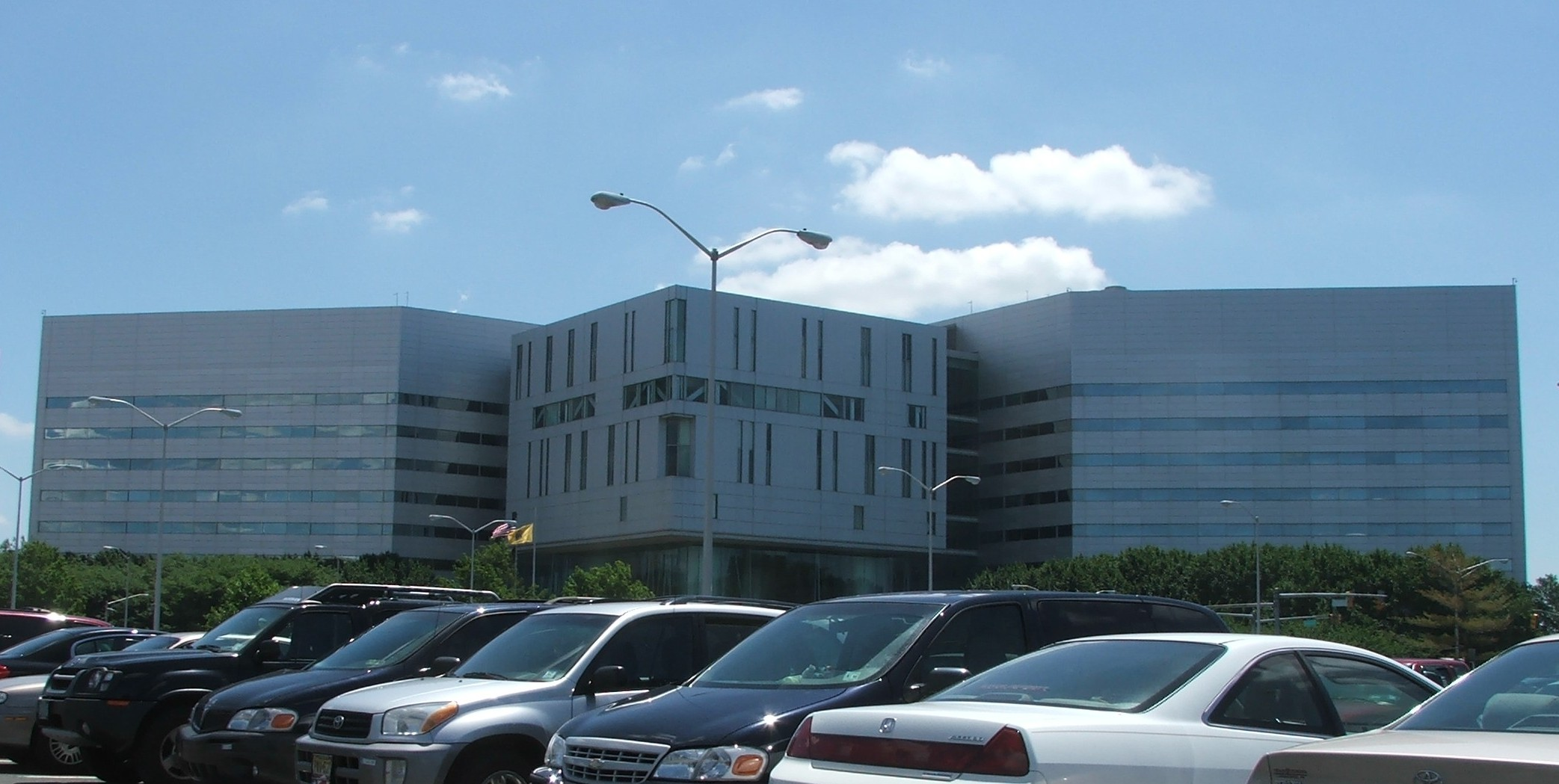
- Richard J. Hughes Justice Complex, seat of the court
- Interactive map of Supreme Court of New Jersey
- 40.213604°N 74.764119°W
- Established: 1947 (in current form)
- Jurisdiction: State of New Jersey
- Location: Richard J. Hughes Justice Complex, Trenton, New Jersey, U.S.
- Coordinates: 40.213604°N 74.764119°W
- Motto: "Independence. Integrity. Fairness. Quality Service"
- Composition method: Executive appointment with legislative confirmation
- Authorised by: New Jersey State Constitution
- Appeals to: Supreme Court of the United States (on questions of federal constitutional or statutory law only)
- Appeals from: Local courts
- Judge term length: 7 years, then until 70 years of age
- Number of positions: 7
- Website: Official website

Chief Justice
- Currently: Stuart Rabner
- Since: June 29, 2007
- Lead position ends: June 30, 2030

The Supreme Court of New Jersey is the highest court in the U.S. state of New Jersey. In its current form, the Supreme Court of New Jersey is the final judicial authority on all cases in the state court system, including cases challenging the validity of state laws under the state constitution. It has the sole authority to prescribe and amend court rules and regulate the practice of law, and it is the arbiter and overseer of the decennial legislative redistricting. Two of its former members, Mahlon Pitney and William J. Brennan Jr., became associate justices of the Supreme Court of the United States.

It has existed in three different forms under the three different state constitutions since the independence of the state in 1776. As currently constituted, the court replaced the prior New Jersey Court of Errors and Appeals, which had been the highest court created under the Constitution of 1844. Now, the Supreme Court hears appeals from the Appellate Division and, on rare occasions, other cases from within the judicial and administrative system directly, by order of the Court.

== Previous compositions ==
Until the Constitution of 1947, the Supreme Court was an intermediate court. Under the two previous New Jersey state constitutions (1776 and 1844), the phrase "Supreme Court" referred to a lower court, similar to the New York Supreme Court. Both the "supreme court" and the actual highest court were composed in a radically different manner from that of the current supreme court or its inferior courts.

=== Under the 1776 constitution ===
Under the colonial constitution of 1776, the upper house of the legislature (which was styled the Legislative Council) along with the governor was to be "the Court of Appeals", defined as the court of last resort, similar to the Law Lords of Great Britain. A separate "Supreme Court" was also mentioned, but no indication of its duties was given, only term limits of its judges (seven years). As time progressed and political philosophies changed, people took issue with numerous parts of the original constitution: It was hastily thrown together, used property qualifications for enfranchisement, contained scant guarantees of freedoms, was unamendable, and freely intermingled the three branches of government.

== Jurisdiction ==
The official seal of the Supreme Court, as included in certificates granted to attorneys approved by the Board on Attorney Certification in one of several specialist areas.

Under the current (1947 and amended) constitution, the highest court in the state is the Supreme Court. It does not have original jurisdiction; instead, it hears appeals, oversees the state's court system, and regulates the legal profession within the state.

Normally, an appeal from one of the trial divisions of the New Jersey Superior Court goes to the Appellate Division of that court. Thereafter, it may be brought before the Supreme Court if a statute provides that the case may go to that court, or if it meets one or more of the following five requirements:

- as of right if the case involves a question of constitutionality;
- as of right if an Appellate Division judge dissented from that court's ruling;
- formerly, as of right if the case involved capital punishment (now abolished in New Jersey);
- at the Supreme Court's discretion, when the Supreme Court grants certification; or
- by operation of law if the case involves the drawing of political boundaries (see below).

=== Political functions ===
The court serves as a de facto tie-breaker in case the twelve-member New Jersey Redistricting Commission fails to come to an agreement on who the 13th independent tie-breaking member will be, following the decennial United States Census. If the commission reports ("certifies") to the court that it is evenly divided, the commission may nominate two people to become an independent 13th member. The court appoints the one deemed "more qualified," who will then break the tie.

If the Commission still cannot reach a 7–6 majority in favor of a final redistricting configuration, the two district plans receiving the greatest number of votes, but not fewer than five votes, are submitted to the Supreme Court, which selects and certifies whichever of the two plans so submitted conforms most closely to the requirements of the Constitution and laws of the United States.

In the case of the Apportionment Commission for state legislative districts, the Chief Justice alone gets to pick the final 11th member of the commission. The court also acts as final arbiter of the inability or absence of the Governor or Lieutenant Governor, following a declaration by the Legislature. As in federal impeachment trials, in case of impeachment of the Governor, the Chief Justice presides.

== Membership ==
=== Appointment, composition, and life on the bench ===
The Governor nominates all justices to the Court but may choose only from among those lawyers admitted to the New Jersey bar for at least ten years. Following seven days of public notice, nominees are put before the Senate for "advice and consent". Once appointed after State Senate confirmation, justices (and all state judges in New Jersey) serve for an initial term of seven years. After their initial term, the Governor may choose to nominate them for tenure, sending the nomination for tenure to the State Senate, which must again decide whether or not to grant advice and consent. Judges confirmed to a tenured position on the Court serve until they die, resign, retire or are retired, are impeached and removed, or reach the age of 70, at which point they are automatically retired. The Court consists of seven justices, one of whom serves as the chief justice. The chief justice may select judges from the Superior Court, senior in service, to serve temporarily on the Supreme Court when he determines it necessary to fill a vacancy.

The salary of the chief justice of the New Jersey Supreme Court is $192,795, while the salary of each associate justice is $185,482. Once in office, the salary of judges may not be decreased. While sitting on the bench, judges are not permitted to practice law or earn money from any other source.

A majority of the General Assembly may pass articles of impeachment against a justice, which the Senate will then try. Only a two-thirds majority will convict, and the Senate may punish a convicted justice with only removal from office and prohibition on holding future office. After a justice has been impeached by the General Assembly—but before the Senate renders a verdict on the charges—the justice may not exercise any official function. By virtue of accepting a position in the Executive or Legislative branches of government or becoming a candidate for political office, a justice is considered as resigned from the bench.

Should a justice or judge become "incapacitated" to the point at which they can no longer continue in office, the Court as a whole may notify the governor. The governor then appoints a three-member commission and, depending on their decision, may force them to retire.

=== Current membership ===
By tradition, a partisan balance is maintained on the Supreme Court, with the sitting governor permitted to arrange his appointments so that his party has a one-seat advantage. The tradition of partisan balance can influence the governor's selection of a chief justice, a fact demonstrated in 2006 when Chief Justice Deborah Poritz, a Republican, reached the mandatory retirement age. To avoid appointing a Republican to the highest judicial position in the state, Democratic governor Jon Corzine instead elevated Associate Justice James R. Zazzali, a Democrat, to the chief justice position and appointed a Republican to fill the seat Zazzali had occupied. When Zazzali reached the age of 70 less than a year later, Corzine was able to nominate a Democrat, Attorney General and former federal prosecutor Stuart Rabner, to serve as chief justice. The state Senate confirmed Rabner on June 21, 2007, and he was sworn in as chief justice eight days later.

Traditionally in New Jersey, the governor re-submits for tenure the justices whose initial terms have expired,

Governor Chris Christie, a Republican, elected not to renominate Justice John E. Wallace Jr. in May 2010 and instead nominated attorney Anne M. Patterson. After New Jersey Senate Majority Leader Stephen Sweeney, a Democrat, refused to consider any nominee to Wallace's seat, Christie nominated Patterson to replace Justice Rivera-Soto who announced he would step down when his term expired in September 2011. The New Jersey Senate unanimously confirmed Patterson on June 28, 2011. She was sworn into a seat on the Court, replacing Rivera-Soto, on September 1, 2011.

An impasse between Christie and the Democratic State Senate resulted in longstanding vacancies, and the rejection or refusal to consider several Christie nominees. On May 21, 2014, a compromise was reported under which the Governor agreed to re-appoint Chief Justice Rabner, and the Senate agreed to consider the nomination of Judge Lee Solomon, a Republican.

In May 2018, Governor Phil Murphy announced his intention to renominate Justice Anne Patterson for tenure. Justice Patterson was reconfirmed by the Senate on July 26, 2018. On June 5, 2020, Murphy announced his intention to nominate Fabiana Pierre-Louis to replace Justice Walter F. Timpone, who was required to retire on November 10, 2020. On August 24, 2020, the New Jersey Senate's Judiciary Committee voted 11–0 to advance her nomination to the full Senate, and on August 27, 2020, the Senate voted 39–0 to confirm her to the Court. Pierre-Louis assumed office on September 1, 2020.

Also in June 2020, Murphy announced his intention to nominate Justice Faustino Fernandez-Vina for tenure. On October 29, 2020, the Senate voted 34–0 to grant Fernandez-Vina tenure.

On March 8, 2021, Justice Jaynee LaVecchia announced that she would retire on August 31, 2021, more than three years before her mandatory retirement date. A week later, Murphy announced his intention to nominate Rachel Wainer Apter, the director of the New Jersey Division of Civil Rights, to replace LaVecchia. Apter was blocked for 14 months by Republican Senator Holly Schepisi by a process called senatorial consent (similar to the blue slip process for federal judgeships), and was only allowed to move forward after two more justices, Barry T. Albin and Faustino J. Fernandez-Vina, had reached retirement age in the interim and Murphy nominated Republican Douglas M. Fasciale to succeed Fernandez-Vina. Both Apter and Fasciale were confirmed on October 17, 2022.

Name	Born	Start	Term ends	Mandatory retirement	Party	Appointer	Law school
Stuart Rabner, Chief Justice	June 30, 1960 (age 66)	June 29, 2007	– (Note: At the end of their initial seven-year term, the justice was renominated for tenure and was confirmed by the New Jersey Senate to serve until the mandatory retirement age of 70.)	June 30, 2030	Democratic	Jon Corzine (D)	Harvard
Anne M. Patterson	April 15, 1959 (age 67)	September 1, 2011	–	April 15, 2029	Republican	Chris Christie (R)	Cornell
Fabiana Pierre-Louis	September 9, 1980 (age 46)	September 1, 2020	September 1, 2027	September 9, 2050	Democratic	Phil Murphy (D)	Rutgers-Camden
Rachel Wainer Apter	July 22, 1980 (age 46)	October 21, 2022	October 21, 2029	July 22, 2050	Democratic	Phil Murphy (D)	Harvard
Douglas M. Fasciale	November 5, 1960 (age 65)	October 21, 2022 (Note: Fasciale served in a temporary appointment from September 1, 2022 – October 21, 2022)	October 21, 2029	November 5, 2030	Republican	Phil Murphy (D)	Seton Hall
Michael Noriega	March 27, 1978 (age 48)	July 6, 2023	July 6, 2030	March 27, 2048	Democratic	Phil Murphy (D)	Seton Hall
John Jay Hoffman	August 23, 1965 (age 61)	October 2, 2024	October 2, 2031	August 23, 2035	Independent	Phil Murphy (D)	Duke

== Important cases ==
=== Constitutional law ===
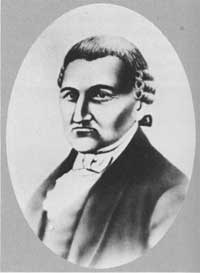
David Brearley, author of the precedent setting Holmes v. Walton

The principle of judicial review in New Jersey was the result of then Chief Justice David Brearley's opinion in Holmes v. Walton (argued 1779, decided 1780). While the case was decided against the plaintiff, the court's consideration of the matter asserted its ability to determine constitutionality. This was followed by the federal Supreme Court's case of Marbury v. Madison.

In State v. Post and State v. Van Beuren 20 N.J.L. 368, decided together, the constitutionality of slavery in the state was challenged on the grounds that the first article of the first section of the newly passed (1844) state constitution ("All men are by nature free and independent...") precluded it. The court by two to one (with one absence), rejected this stating that "the constitution has not ... abolished slavery." Slavery was abolished nationwide by the Thirteenth Amendment to the United States Constitution in 1865.

=== Individual rights ===
The Court has delivered many cases concerning the rights of individuals, in many cases reading them expansively:

In its 1966 decision in Clover Hill Swimming Club, Inc. v. Robert F. Goldsboro and Division on Civil Rights (47 N.J. 25; 219 A.2d 161; 1966 N.J. LEXIS 180), the court ruled against the club, which had denied membership to an African-American. The club claimed that as a private organization it could choose its own membership although it had placed advertisements in local newspapers and magazines.

In State ex rel. T. L. O., 463 A. 2d 934 (1983) the court decided, against two lower courts, that a search of a student's purse without a warrant was unreasonable. This was appealed as New Jersey v. T. L. O. 469 U.S. 325 (1985), wherein the United States Supreme Court ruled that students and minors have a lower expectation of privacy, saying in its noted ruling that "school officials need not obtain a warrant before searching a student who is under their authority."

In re Quinlan 355 A.2d 647 concerned the right to die of Karen Ann Quinlan, who was in a persistent vegetative state following prolonged respiratory failure. Her parents (and legal guardians) requested to have her ventilator removed, which the officials at the hospital refused to do. The court ultimately ruled in her parents' favor. She continued to live without artificial respiration for several years afterwards.

In 1988, the Court ruled in In re Baby M (537 A.2d 1227, 109 N.J. 396) that the surrogate mother of Baby M, despite previous rulings denying her custody, was entitled to visitation rights.

In Desilets v. Clearview Regional Board of Education (647 A.2d. 150, 137 N.J. 585 (1994)), the Court ruled that Clearview did not violate students' free speech rights under the First Amendment or the New Jersey State Constitution.

Dale v. Boy Scouts of America (160 N.J. 562 (1999)) concerned the right of the Boy Scouts of America organization to expel a member for declaring himself to be homosexual. James Dale, the plaintiff, was a member of the organization for some years before he made his orientation public. Upon discovering this, the district BSA council revoked his membership. Dale sued for violating the New Jersey Law Against Discrimination, which the court unanimously agreed applied to the BSA. The U.S. Supreme Court reversed in Boy Scouts of America v. Dale, 530 U.S. 640 (2000), a 5–4 decision. Apprendi v. New Jersey, a later ruling, was also overruled.

In a 4–2 vote in 2000, the court struck down a law signed by Governor Christine Whitman requiring parental notification when abortions were performed on minor children. The court held that the privacy rights of the minors were paramount and were guaranteed by New Jersey's state constitution.

The court's 2006 decision in Caballero v. Martinez concerned an illegal immigrant, Victor Manuel Caballero, who was injured during an accident while riding in an uninsured vehicle driven by an unlicensed person. The Unsatisfied Claim and Judgment Fund, set up to cover injuries by uninsured drivers, refused to compensate him as he was not a legal resident. The Court on hearing his case overruled two lower courts and declared Caballero to be entitled to compensation from the fund, stating that "a person may be a 'resident' even if the intent to remain ultimately is not realized". Previously an individual who had lived five months with relatives was not a resident with respect to the Fund.

In 2006, the Court decided in Lewis v. Harris that the legislature must change state law, within 180 days, to afford equal protection to same-sex couples, via marriage, or an identical substitute, such as civil unions. The New Jersey Legislature responded by enacting civil unions. This case was the basis for a New Jersey Superior Court ruling that led to the legalization of same-sex marriage in New Jersey in Garden State Equality v. Dow.

In 2020, the Court decided in State of New Jersey v. Andrews, by a 4–3 vote, that a court order compelling a defendant to provide the passwords to his cell phones to the police did not violate either federal or state protections against compelled disclosure of potentially self-incriminating information. This ruling contributed to a growing split in how federal and state courts have addressed the issue of compelled decryption, with the Massachusetts Supreme Judicial Court and the United States Court of Appeals for the Third Circuit reaching similar decisions and state supreme courts in Indiana and Pennsylvania deciding the opposite.

=== Social and political cases ===
In State v. Driver (1962), the Court held that a sound recording of an interrogation of a defendant can only be admitted into evidence if it is competent and relevant. The Court introduced a five-factor test to assess whether a recorded interrogation is admissible.

In Abbott v. Burke (1981), or Abbott I, which was filed on behalf of students of the most depressed school districts, the Court decided that a single test must be applied statewide to determine if students were getting the constitutionally mandated education. Also, the Abbott districts are given state aid to match the operating budget of the richer districts. Since then there have been seven "Abbott cases", many of which ended with the court finding the New Jersey Legislature's latest educational acts unconstitutional.

In 1975 and 1983, two cases, both named Southern Burlington County N.A.A.C.P. v. Mount Laurel Township, were decided by the Court. The Constitution was interpreted to require that zoning authorities institute inclusionary zoning of their land to create affordable housing, that the districts had to equally take on the required load of housing, and that exclusionary zoning was illegal. These requirements are now commonly referred to as the Mount Laurel Doctrine.

State v. Kelly, 91 N.J. 178 (1984), is a Supreme Court case where the defendant, Gladys Kelly, was on trial for allegedly murdering her husband, Ernest Kelly, with a pair of scissors. The Supreme Court reversed the case for further trial after finding that expert testimony regarding the defense's submission that Kelly suffered from battered woman syndrome was incorrectly excluded, as the syndrome was a proper subject for expert evidence despite being a new field.

In Democratic Party v. Samson, 814 A.2d 1028 (2002), the Court allowed the state Democratic Party to change their candidate for the upcoming federal Senate race from Robert Torricelli to Frank Lautenberg despite the deadline having passed. In its opinion it cited previous cases before the Court, including one stating "Election laws are to be liberally construed", to decide that the change was in the interest of the electorate.

== See also ==
- List of justices of the Supreme Court of New Jersey
- List of New Jersey Supreme Court cases

== Works cited ==
- New Jersey State Constitution of 1776, July 2, 1776
- New Jersey State Constitution of 1947, November 4, 1947
