= James Hendricks =

James Hendricks may refer to:

- Jim Hendricks (musician), American guitarist and folk musician
- James Hendricks (colonist), merchant, farmer and Continental Army officer during the Revolutionary War
- Jimmy Hendricks, American murder victim, see murder of Jimmy Hendricks and Kim Mills

== See also ==
- Jim Hendricks, American actor and former disc jockey
- James Hendrix (disambiguation)
