= Kim Mills =

Kim Mills may refer to:

- Kim Mills (director) (1931–2006), British television director of ten episodes of The Avengers, among others
- Kim Mills (murder victim), discovered on June 17, 1978
