= Kearny Cottage =

Historic house in New Jersey, United States

- Lawrence Kearny House
- U.S. National Register of Historic Places
- New Jersey Register of Historic Places
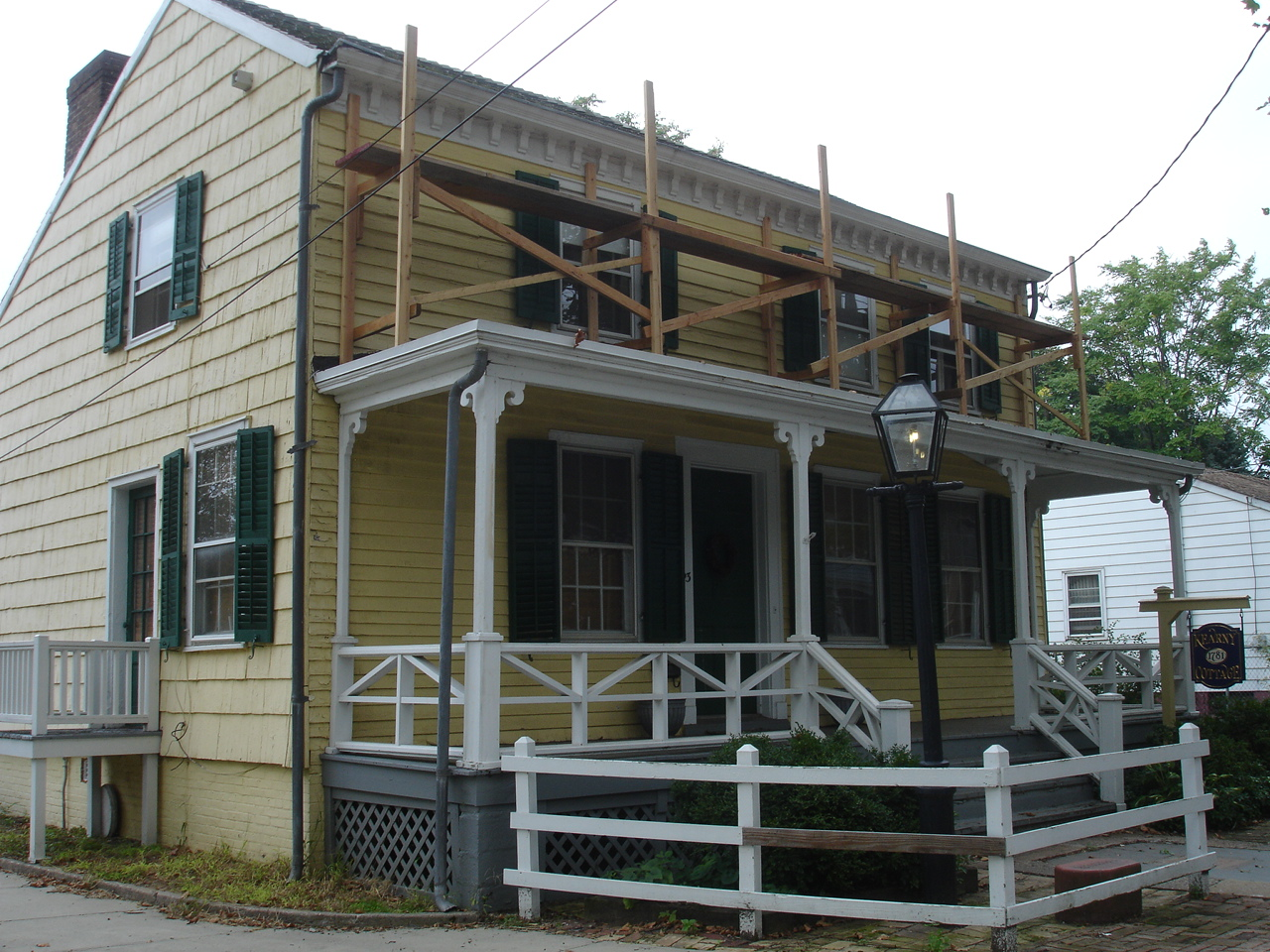
- The Lawrence House in fall 2011

- Location within Middlesex County, New Jersey Location within New Jersey Location within the United States
- Location: 63 Catalpa Avenue; Perth Amboy, New Jersey
- Coordinates: 40°30′23″N 74°15′57″W
- Built: 1781
- Architectural style: 18th century vernacular
- NRHP reference No.: 76001166
- NJRHP No.: 1894

Significant dates
- Added to NRHP: May 28, 1976
- Designated NJRHP: September 16, 1975

The Kearny Cottage is a historic home in Perth Amboy, Middlesex County, New Jersey, United States. It is open to the public as a historic house museum and is operated by Kearny Cottage Historical Society.

Built in 1781, it was originally located on High Street but was moved to Sadowski Parkway when the last Kearny descendant died in the 1920s. The building was later moved again to where it now stands at 63 Catalpa Avenue, just inland from the mouth of the Raritan River. The four-room cottage is a museum operated by Kearny Cottage Historical Society and serves as a repository for many items donated by citizens of Perth Amboy reflecting the maritime history of its owners and the city. A colonial garden is located on the grounds.

The cottage was home Elizabeth Lawrence Kearny, the poet Lady Scribblerus, and Michael Kearny. Their son, Lawrence Kearny was born and died in the house. Commodore Kearny was famous for his open door trade policy with China and he was known as “the Sailor Diplomat.”

The house is listed on the New Jersey Register of Historic Places and National Register of Historic Places as the Lawrence Kearny House

== See also ==
- List of the oldest buildings in New Jersey
- National Register of Historic Places listings in Middlesex County, New Jersey
