= James Hendrix =

James Hendrix may refer to:

- Jimi Hendrix (1942–1970), American rock guitarist, singer, and songwriter
- James R. Hendrix (1925–2002), United States Army master sergeant and Medal of Honor recipient
- James Wesley Hendrix (born 1977), United States District Judge

== See also ==
- James Hendricks (disambiguation)
