= Maurer, Perth Amboy =

Populated place in Middlesex County, New Jersey, US

Maurer, New Jersey
- Unincorporated community
- Maurer, Perth Amboy, Middlesex County, New Jersey
- Coordinates: 40°32′13″N 74°16′09″W
- Country: United States
- State: New Jersey
- County: Middlesex
- City: Perth Amboy
- Established: 1876
- Elevation: 13 ft (4.0 m)
- Time zone: EST
- GNIS feature ID: 878195

Maurer is residential neighbourhood and industrial district of Perth Amboy in Middlesex County, in the U.S. state of New Jersey. Its name is derived from the "company town" built there in 1876. It is north of the Route 440 approach to the Outerbridge Crossing and south of the Perth Amboy Refinery, which began in 1920 as the Barber Asphalt Company. For a time it was known as Barber, a name which has fallen out of use

The eastern area along the waterfront was active during World War II in building and decommissioning ships for the U.S. Navy. One of the primary ship builders during World War II was the New Jersey Shipbuilding Company. The community also housed the American Smelting and Refining Company.

== See also ==
- Neighborhoods in Perth Amboy, New Jersey
- Amzi L. Barber
