= Perth Amboy Public Library =

Public library in the city of Perth Amboy, New Jersey, U.S.

- U.S. National Register of Historic Places
- New Jersey Register of Historic Places
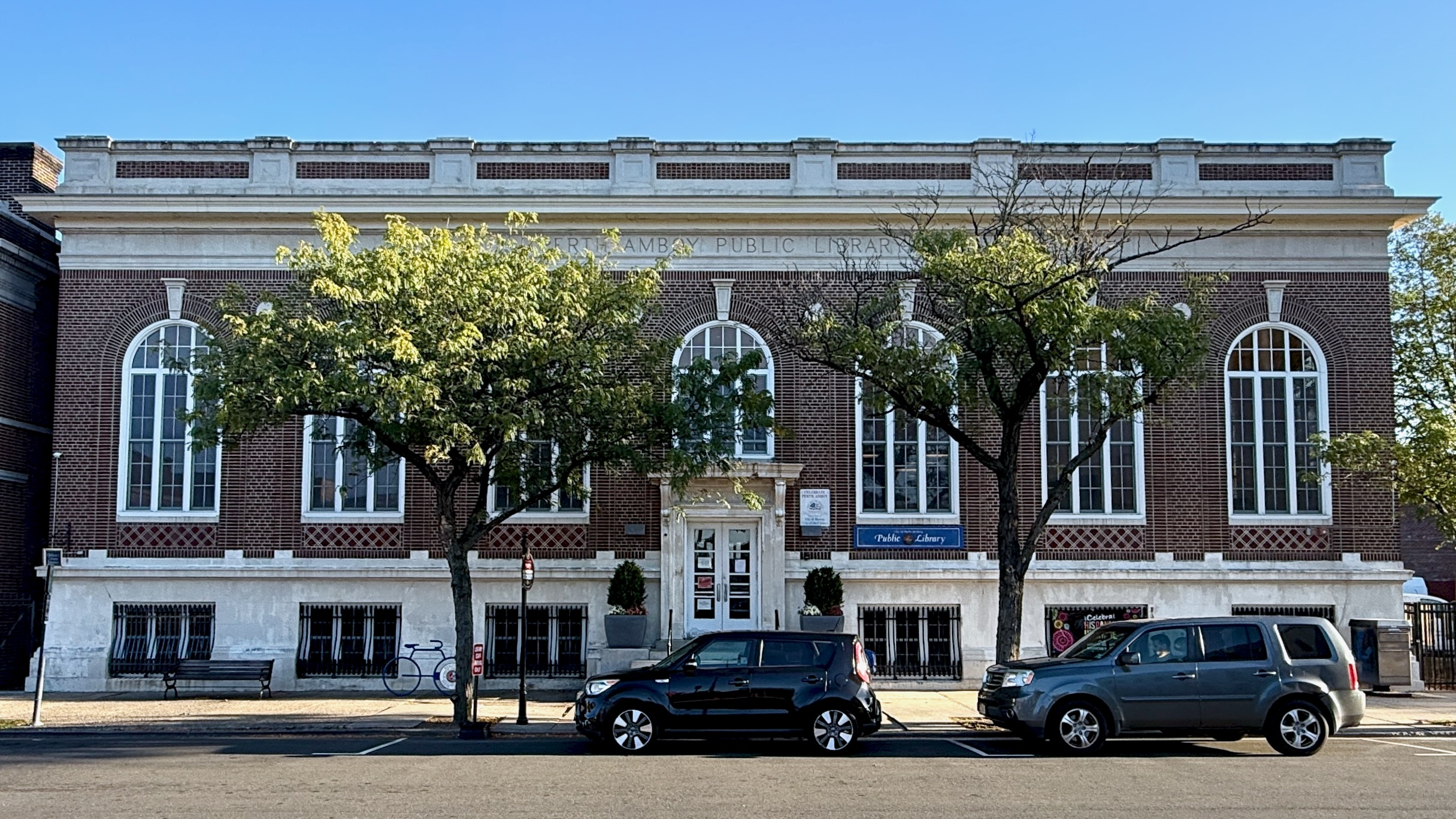

- Location within Middlesex County, New Jersey Location within New Jersey Location within the United States
- Location: 196 Jefferson Street, Perth Amboy, New Jersey
- Coordinates: 40°30′37.8″N 74°16′13.8″W
- Built: 1903, 1915
- Architectural style: Beaux Arts, Classical Revival
- NRHP reference No.: 100012279
- NJRHP No.: 4999

Significant dates
- Added to NRHP: September 24, 2025
- Designated NJRHP: July 28, 2025

The Perth Amboy Public Library is the free public library in the city of Perth Amboy, New Jersey, located at 196 Jefferson Street. It was added to the National Register of Historic Places on September 24, 2025, for its significance in architecture.

== Circulation ==
Serving a population of 47,000, the collection includes a collection of 177,469 volumes and circulates 110,260 items per year. The library is a member of the Libraries of Middlesex Automation Consortium.

== History ==
In 1825, several Perth Amboy citizens created the Perth Amboy Library Company, but disbanded in 1835 with the book collection being scattered. The Perth Amboy Library Association was created in 1888, again by a group of locals citizens who in 1891 the saw the library became incorporated under state law. In 1896, the Perth Amboy Free Public Library, with municipal support. From its inception the library relocated five times.

== Carnegie building ==
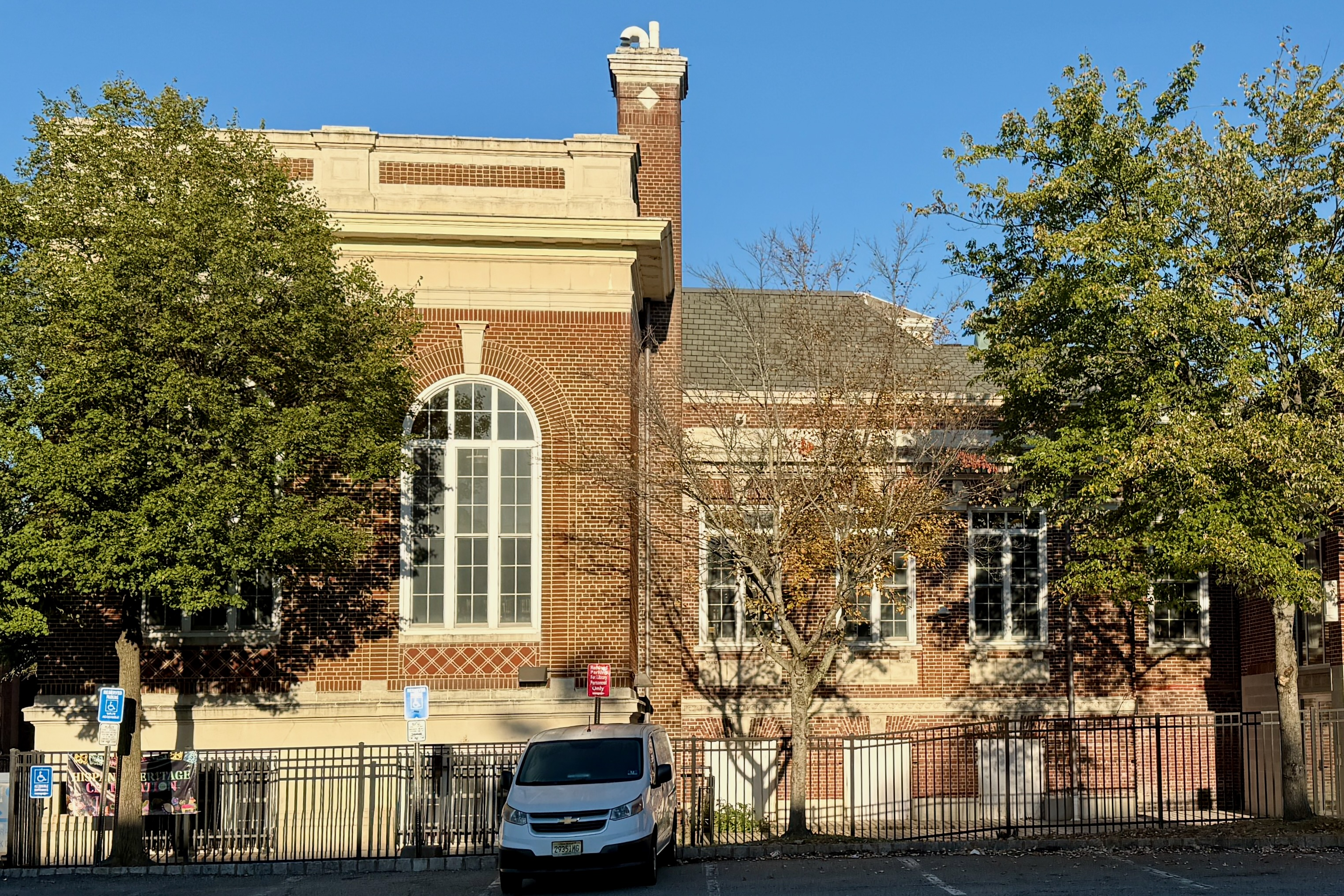
East elevation: 1915 addition on the left, original Beaux Arts 1903 building on the right

The current building is one of the first of New Jersey's original 36 Carnegie libraries, built with partial funding from the Andrew Carnegie in 1901. It was built on land donated by J. C. Mc Coy, of the Raritan Copper Works. A donation of $1,000 from Adolph Lewisohn was made to purchase new books. The city agreed to operate and maintain the new facility. Dedicated on December 3, 1903, it one of three Carnegie libraries opened that year still in use. In 1914, the Carnegie Corporation donated an additional $30,000 for the creation of two reading rooms. A Children's Library was added in 1925, but was destroyed by fire in 1977 and not rebuilt. The Children's Library was the basement, a space which had been used as a meeting room and theater. A branch library was created at the Shull School in 1925, but later closed to make way for additional classrooms. In 2010, renovations of the original building, including the replacement windows and repairs to the roof, were made as part of a restoration project. Dennis Kowal Architects prepared a Historic Preservation and Renovation study released in 2010. It recommends restoring the library, exposing hidden skylights, enlarging the children's library, as well as new restrooms, stairs and elevators to make the facility wheelchair-friendly. An outdoor garden, a meeting room, a local history room, a magazine-reading room and air-conditioning are suggested. It is estimated total costs would run about $3.5 million.

== Expansion plans ==
At 12,351 square feet, the current building does not satisfy the state's 27,214-square-feet minimum required size for a library and is considered too small for the city's 51,000 residents. The 2010 study calls for adding 22,500 square feet by constructing an addition on the east side of the property. Total costs for renovation and new construction are estimated at $9 million.

== See also ==
- List of Carnegie libraries in New Jersey
- National Register of Historic Places listings in Middlesex County, New Jersey
