= Lawrence Kearny =

American politician (1789-1868)

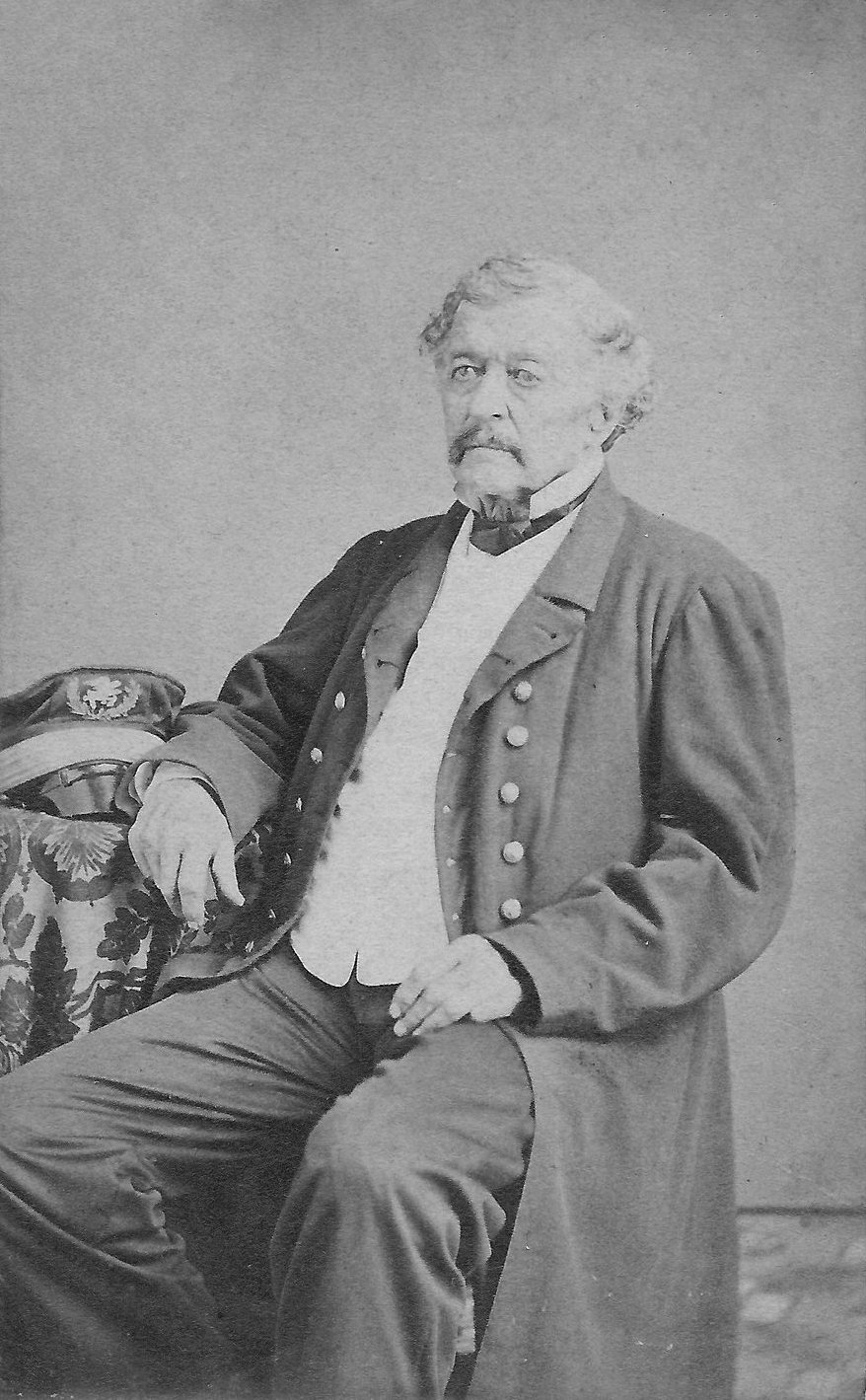

Mayor of Perth Amboy, New Jersey
- In office 1848–1849

Personal details
- Born: November 30, 1789 Perth Amboy, New Jersey
- Died: November 29, 1868 (aged 78) Perth Amboy, New Jersey
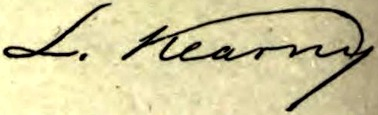
- Signature

Commodore Lawrence Kearny (30 November 1789 – 29 November 1868) was an officer in the United States Navy during the early nineteenth century. In the early 1840s he began negotiations with China which opened that country to U.S. trade and pointed the way toward the American Open Door Policy a half century later. He was Mayor of Perth Amboy, New Jersey in 1848.

== Early life ==
Born in Perth Amboy, New Jersey, Kearny was appointed Midshipman in the Navy 24 July 1807. Commodore Kearny was known for his tenacity in capturing slave traders in West-Indian waters and his efforts in fighting Greek pirates in the Mediterranean Sea. Kearny served aboard USS Nonsuch. In 1818, he commanded USS Enterprise of the New Orleans Squadron when he sailed to Galveston, Texas and forced Jean Lafitte to abandon his base without a fight.

== Pacific Diplomacy ==
=== China ===
Some Americans in China suffered during the first Opium War of 1839 as Chinese indignant about British opium traders failed to distinguish between English-speaking people of European ancestry. Commodore Kearny was given command of a squadron consisting of the 42-year-old frigate Constellation and the sloop Boston. Kearny's March 1842 arrival in China reflects the speed of early 19th century communications. Kearny's orders—to 1) protect the interests of the United States and her citizens along the coast of China, 2) to respect the foreign and domestic policies of the Chinese, and 3) prevent and punish opium smuggling into China by Americans or under the cover of the American flag—similarly reflect the broad discretion given to naval officers who would have to wait months for official response from higher authority.

The Opium War had ended, but letters from American merchants began arriving aboard as soon as Constellation anchored in Macau. The letters requested protection from the Chinese and demanded reparations for damages. Kearny first issued a ban against American smuggling and then reviewed the reparations claims. Kearny considered some claims valid and others gross overstatements. Viceroy Ke in Guangzhou wrote to the United States Vice Consul: "...I have heard that the newly arrived Commodore manages affairs with clear understanding, profound wisdom, and great justice." Ke committed China to abide by Kearny's decisions regarding adjudication of claims, and several hundred thousand dollars were paid to American merchants.

Kearny first learned of the Treaty of Nanking when he arrived in Hong Kong. Kearny observed the treaty's provisions opening five Chinese ports to British trade, and sought equal trading opportunity for Americans. Ke offered Kearny a treaty giving Americans fair treatment. Kearny did not have authority to sign such a treaty, but tactfully informed Ke agreement would be forthcoming as soon as authorized negotiators arrived. Caleb Cushing reached China in 1844, and the Treaty of Wanghia was signed on 2 July.

=== Hawaii ===
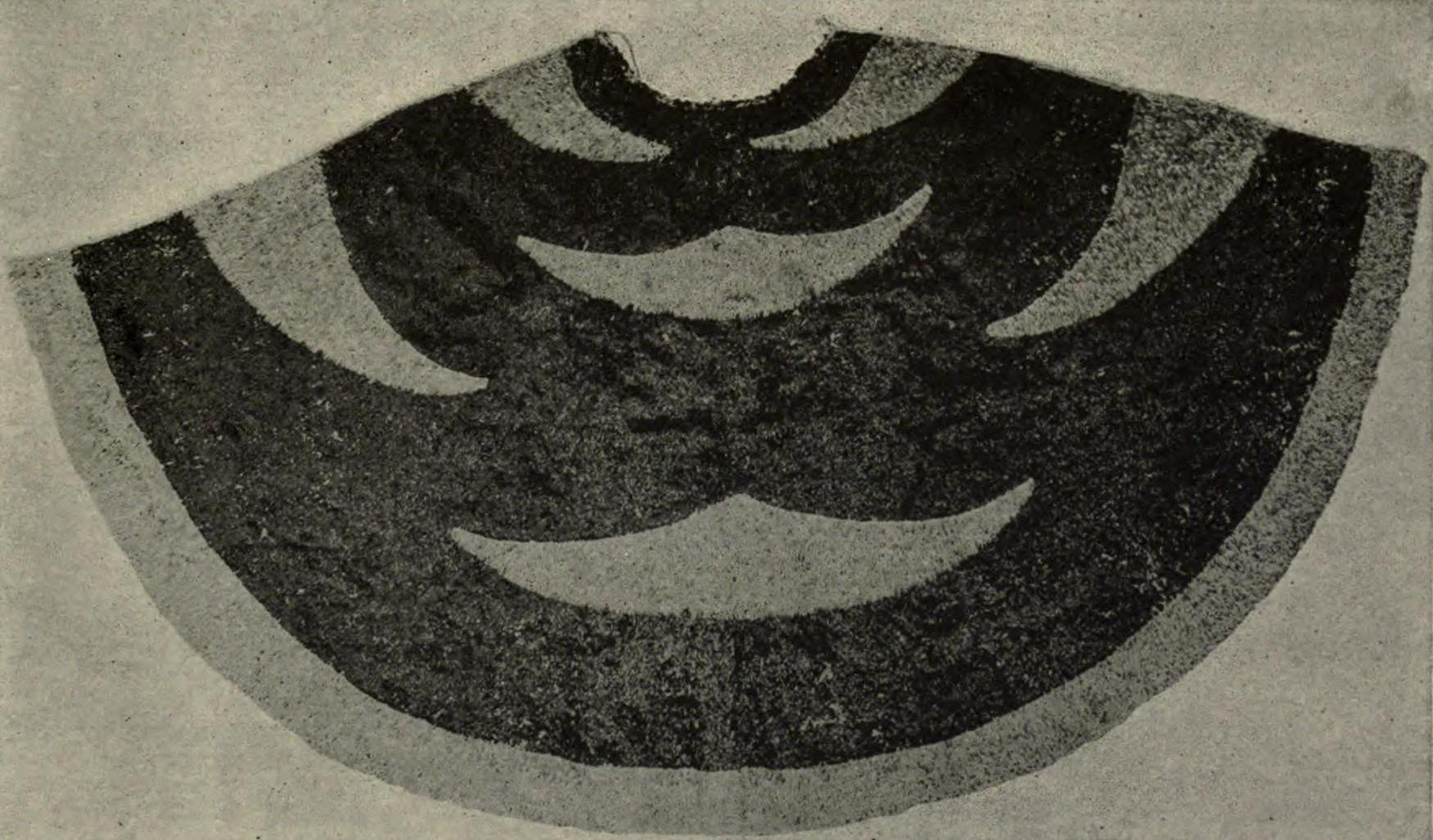
Hawaiian feather cloak presented to Kearny by King Kamehameha III during his visit.

Kearny visited the Hawaiian Islands on his return voyage in July 1843. He discovered King Kamehameha III had ceded the islands to Great Britain under threat of naval bombardment by Lord George Paulet. He received letters of protests from American residents of Honolulu. Commodore Thomas ap Catesby Jones arrived a short time later on the USS United States .

Kearny's orders were 3 years old at that point, and English disavowal of Paulet's actions was unknown to either side in Hawaii. Kearny issued a stiff, formal protest against the seizure and refused to recognize its validity until Hawaiian and English representatives settled the matter with United States representatives. England's senior officer in the Pacific, Rear Admiral Thomas, arrived two weeks later with the news Hawaiian sovereignty had been restored.

=== Later career ===
Commodore Kearny later served as Commandant at the Norfolk and New York Naval Shipyards. He retired November 14, 1861. He died in Perth Amboy, New Jersey on November 29, 1868.

== Namesake ==
USS Kearny (DD-432) was named for him. Kearny Cottage was Kearny's lifelong residence.

== Notes ==
Military offices
Preceded by George C. Read	Commander, East India Squadron; 4 February 1841–27 February 1843	Succeeded by Foxhall A. Parker, Sr.
