= Joseph J. Sadowski =

- Born: December 8, 1917; Perth Amboy, New Jersey, US
- Died: September 14, 1944 (aged 26); Valhey, France
- Burial place: Saint Stephens Cemetery, Keasbey, New Jersey
- Military career
- Allegiance: United States of America
- Branch: United States Army
- Service years: 1941 - 1944
- Rank: Sergeant
- Units: 37th Tank Battalion, 4th Armored Division
- Conflicts: World War II
- Awards: Medal of Honor; Purple Heart

Joseph John Sadowski (December 8, 1917 – September 14, 1944) was a United States Army sergeant and a recipient of the United States military's highest decoration for valor—the Medal of Honor—for his actions in France during World War II.

== Biography ==
Sadowski joined the Army from his birth city of Perth Amboy, New Jersey in May 1941, and by September 14, 1944, was serving as a Sergeant in Company A, 37th Tank Battalion, 4th Armored Division. On that day, in Valhey, France, Sadowski's tank was disabled by enemy fire. He and his crew dismounted the vehicle, except for one man who was trapped inside the burning tank. Despite intense enemy fire, Sadowski returned to the tank and attempted to rescue the crewman, but was killed before he could do so. For his actions, he was posthumously awarded the Medal of Honor seven months later, on April 23, 1945.

Sadowski, aged 26 at his death, was buried in Saint Stephens Cemetery, Keasbey, New Jersey. The Sadowski Field House at Fort Knox is named in his honor as well as Sadowski Field at Fort Hood, Texas. A monument to Sadowski was erected on the Parkway bearing his name in Perth Amboy by the Society of Polish Combatants (Stowarzyszenie Polskich Kombatantow), Post 40. In 1999, the citizens of Valhey, France, also erected a monument honoring Sgt. Sadowski. In September, 2009, ceremonies were held at the monument recognizing 65 years since Sgt. Sadowski's death. Colonel James (Jimmie) Leach who knew Sadowski personally and was the commander of Company B, 37th Tank Battalion at the time of Sgt. Sadowski's death, made the remarks about Sadowski.

== Medal of Honor citation ==
Sergeant Sadowski's official Medal of Honor citation reads:

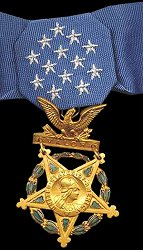
Medal of Honor

For conspicuous gallantry and intrepidity at the risk of his life above and beyond the call of duty at Valhey, France. On the afternoon of 14 September 1944, Sgt. Sadowski as a tank commander was advancing with the leading elements of Combat Command A, 4th Armored Division, through an intensely severe barrage of enemy fire from the streets and buildings of the town of Valhey. As Sgt. Sadowski's tank advanced through the hail of fire, it was struck by a shell from an 88-mm. gun fired at a range of 20 yards. The tank was disabled and burst into flames. The suddenness of the enemy attack caused confusion and hesitation among the crews of the remaining tanks of our forces. Sgt. Sadowski immediately ordered his crew to dismount and take cover in the adjoining buildings. After his crew had dismounted, Sgt. Sadowski discovered that 1 member of the crew, the bow gunner, had been unable to leave the tank. Although the tank was being subjected to a withering hail of enemy small-arms, bazooka, grenade, and mortar fire from the streets and from the windows of adjacent buildings, Sgt. Sadowski unhesitatingly returned to his tank and endeavored to pry up the bow gunner's hatch. While engaged in this attempt to rescue his comrade from the burning tank, he was cut down by a stream of machinegun fire which resulted in his death. The gallant and noble sacrifice of his life in the aid of his comrade, undertaken in the face of almost certain death, so inspired the remainder of the tank crews that they pressed forward with great ferocity and completely destroyed the enemy forces in this town without further loss to themselves. The heroism and selfless devotion to duty displayed by Sgt. Sadowski, which resulted in his death, inspired the remainder of his force to press forward to victory, and reflect the highest tradition of the armed forces.

== Awards and Decorations ==

1st row	Medal of Honor		
2nd row	Purple Heart	Army Good Conduct Medal	American Defense Service Medal
3rd row	American Campaign Medal	European–African–Middle Eastern Campaign Medal with 2 Campaign stars	World War II Victory Medal

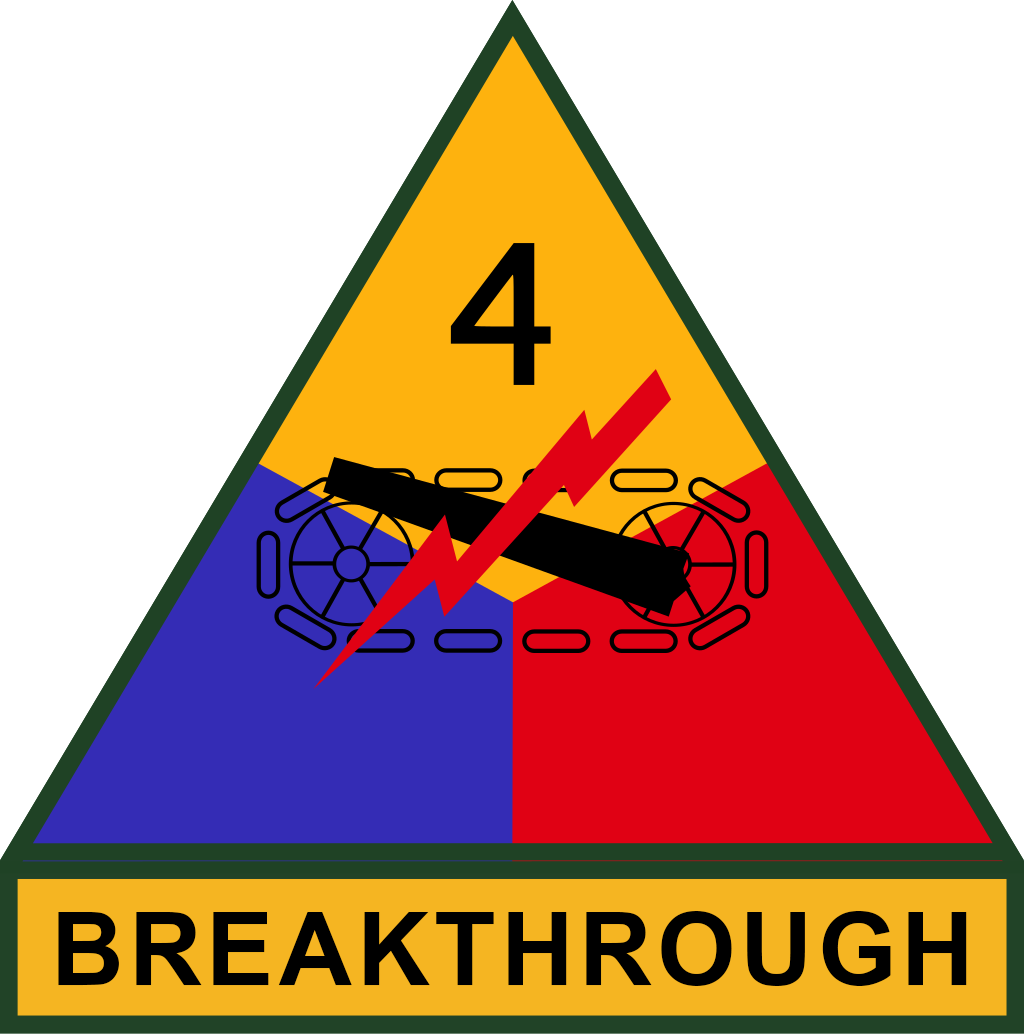

4th Armored Division Insignia

== See also ==
- List of Medal of Honor recipients
- List of Medal of Honor recipients for World War II
- James H. Fields
- James R. Hendrix
