= Perth Amboy, New Jersey =

City in Middlesex County, New Jersey, U.S.

- City
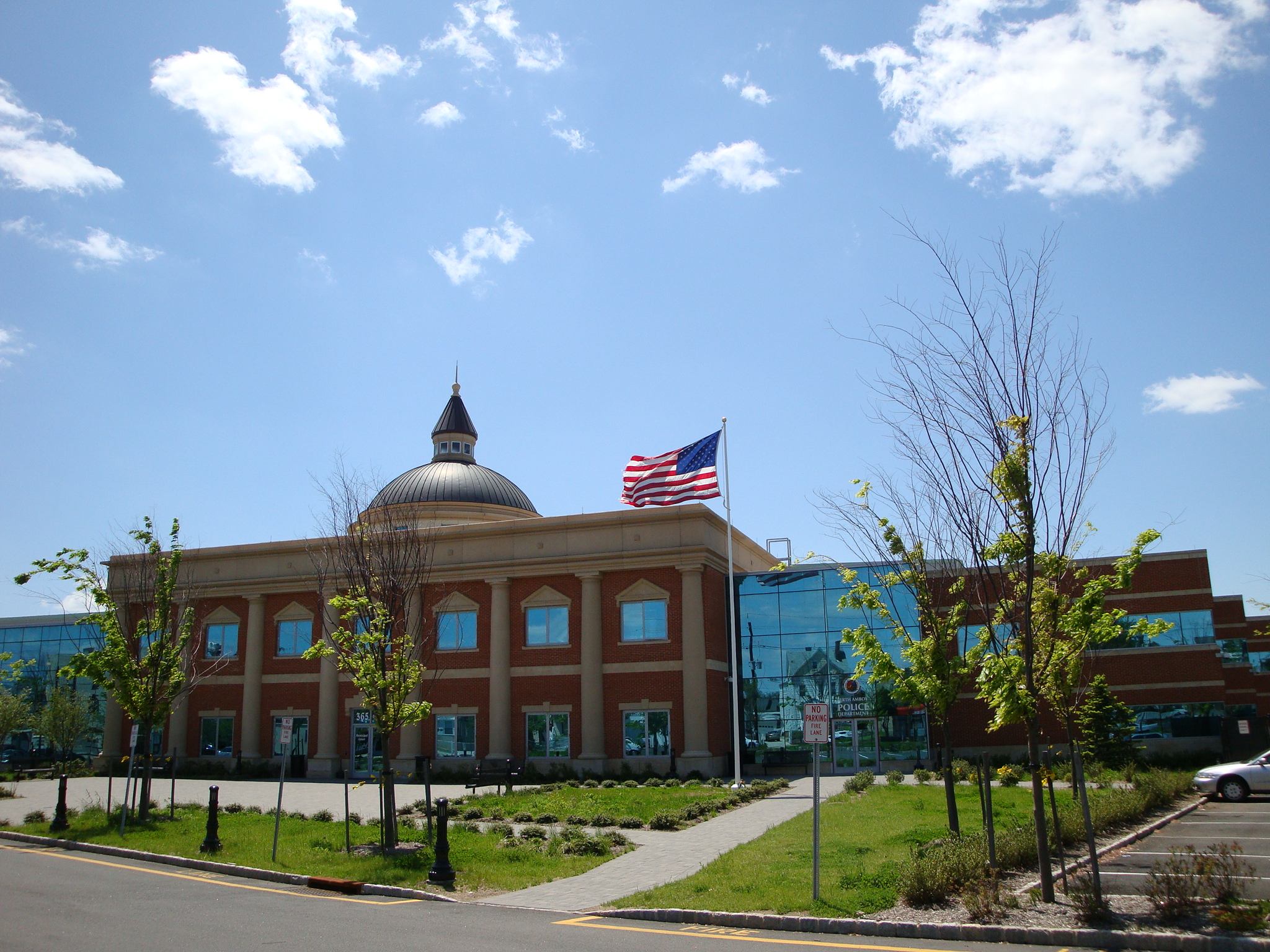
- Perth Amboy courthouse and police station

- Seal
- Motto: The City by the Bay
- Location of Perth Amboy in Middlesex County highlighted in red (left). Inset map: Location of Middlesex County in New Jersey highlighted in orange (right).

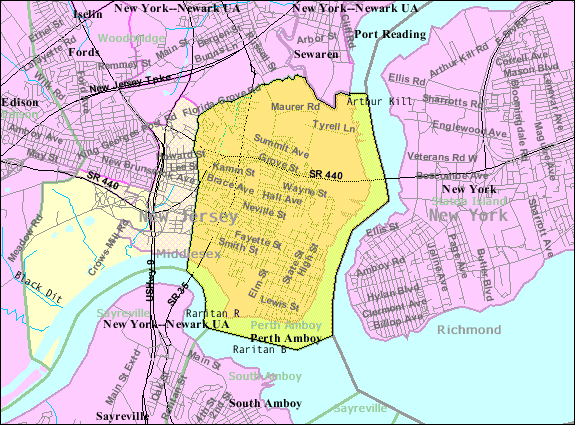
- Census Bureau map of Perth Amboy, New Jersey

- Location in Middlesex County Location in New Jersey Location in the United States
- Coordinates: 40°30′31″N 74°16′4″W
- Country: United States
- State: New Jersey
- County: Middlesex
- Earliest European settlement: 1683
- Royal charter: August 4, 1718
- Incorporated: December 21, 1784
- Reincorporated: April 8, 1844 (included Township)
- Named for: James Drummond, 4th Earl of Perth

Government
  - Type: Faulkner Act (mayor–council)
  - Body: City Council
  - Mayor: Helmin J. Caba (D, term ends December 31, 2028)
  - Administrator: D. Talib Aquil
  - Municipal clerk: Victoria Ann Kupsch

Area
  - Total: 5.96 sq mi (15.44 km^{2})
  - Land: 4.66 sq mi (12.07 km^{2})
  - Water: 1.30 sq mi (3.37 km^{2}) 21.37%
  - Rank: 259th of 565 in state 13th of 25 in county
- Elevation: 62 ft (19 m)

Population (2020)
  - Total: 55,436
  - Estimate (2023): 55,249
  - Rank: 725th in country (as of 2022); 31st of 565 in state 5th of 25 in county
  - Density: 11,891/sq mi (4,591/km^{2})
  - Rank: 27th of 565 in state 1st of 25 in county
- Time zone: UTC−05:00 (Eastern (EST))
  - Summer (DST): UTC−04:00 (Eastern (EDT))
- ZIP Codes: 08861–08863
- Area code: 732 Exchanges: 293, 324, 376, 442, 697, 826
- FIPS code: 3402358200>
- Website: perthamboynj.org

Perth Amboy is a historic waterfront city in northeastern Middlesex County, in the U.S. state of New Jersey, within the New York metropolitan area. As of the 2020 census, the city's population was 55,436. Perth Amboy is known as the "City by the Bay", referring to its location adjoining Raritan Bay.

The earliest residents of the area were the Lenape Native Americans, who called the point on which the city lies "Ompoge". Perth Amboy was settled in 1683 by Scottish colonists and was called "New Perth" after James Drummond, 4th Earl of Perth; the native name was eventually corrupted and the two names were merged. Perth Amboy was formed by Royal charter in 1718, and the New Jersey Legislature reaffirmed its status in 1784, after independence. The city was a capital of the Province of New Jersey from 1686 to 1776. During the mid-1800s, the Industrial Revolution and immigration grew the city, developing a variety of neighborhoods which residents from a diverse range of ethnicities lived in. The city developed into a resort town for the Raritan Bayshore near it, but the city has grown in other industries since its redevelopment starting in the 1990s. Its residents are mostly Hispanic.

Perth Amboy borders the Arthur Kill and features a historic waterfront. The Perth Amboy Ferry Slip was once an important ferry slip on the route south from New York City; it was added to the National Register of Historic Places in 1978. The Raritan Yacht Club, one of the oldest yacht clubs in the United States, is located in the city. Perth Amboy is connected to the Staten Island borough of New York City via the Outerbridge Crossing.

== History ==
=== Name ===
The Lenape Native Americans called the point on which the city is built "Ompoge", meaning "level ground" or "standing or upright". When settled in 1683, the new city was dubbed "New Perth" in honor of James Drummond, Earl of Perth, one of the 12 associates of a company of Scottish proprietors; Drummond has been honored with a statue located outside of city hall. The Algonquian language name persisted, corrupted to Ambo, or Point Amboy, and eventually a combination of the native and colonial names emerged, also appearing in South Amboy.

=== Scottish colony ===
Perth Amboy was settled by Scottish colonists around 1683 who had been recruited to inhabit the share of the East Jersey colony owned by Robert Barclay, a Quaker who would later become the absentee governor of the province.

=== Charter and incorporation ===
Perth Amboy was formed by Royal charter on August 4, 1718, within various townships and again by the New Jersey Legislature on December 21, 1784, within Perth Amboy Township and from part of Woodbridge Township. Perth Amboy Township was formed on October 31, 1693, and was enlarged during the 1720s to encompass Perth Amboy city. Perth Amboy Township was incorporated as one of New Jersey's initial 104 townships through the Township Act of 1798 on February 21, 1798. The township was replaced by Perth Amboy city on April 8, 1844.

=== Provincial capital ===
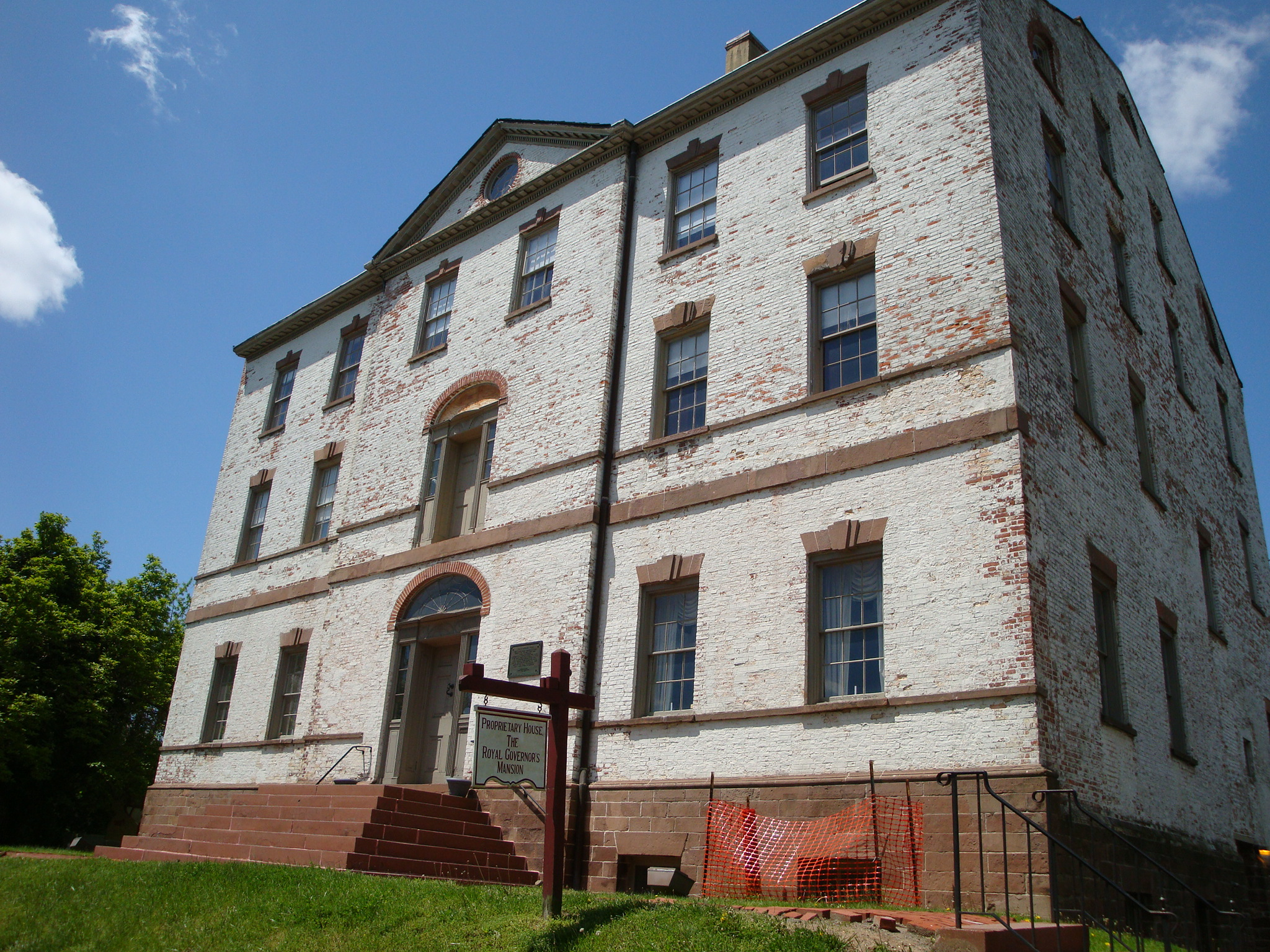
Proprietary House

Elizabeth (then known as Elizabethtown) was designated in 1668 as the first capital of New Jersey. In 1686, Perth Amboy was designated as the capital of East Jersey, while Burlington was the capital of West Jersey. After the two were united as a royal colony in 1702, the two cities alternated as the capital of the Province of New Jersey until November 1790, when Trenton was designated as the unified state capital, chosen based on its location midway between New York City and Philadelphia.

A few of the buildings from this early period can still be seen today. Most notably, the Proprietary House, the home of William Franklin, the last Royal Governor of New Jersey and estranged son of Benjamin Franklin, still stands in the waterfront area of the city. Architect John Edward Pryor was hired in 1761 to design and construct the building, which was completed in September 1764, years late and over budget. Franklin preferred his alternate home in Burlington. Franklin finally moved in 1774 into the Proprietary House. Franklin's father, Ben, tried unsuccessfully to convince his son to support the Colonial cause. William Franklin was arrested and detained at Proprietary House in 1776 until he was tried and convicted of treason.

Perth Amboy City Hall was first built as a court house for Middlesex County in 1714, having been designated as the county seat the previous year. The building was later used as the home of the East Jersey Provincial Assembly. The building was destroyed by a major fire in 1731 and rebuilt in 1745. Another fire was deliberately set in 1764, forcing a rebuilding that was completed in 1767. It is the oldest city hall in continuous use in the United States. On November 20, 1789, City Hall was the site where the New Jersey General Assembly met to ratify the Bill of Rights, becoming the first state in the nation to do so.

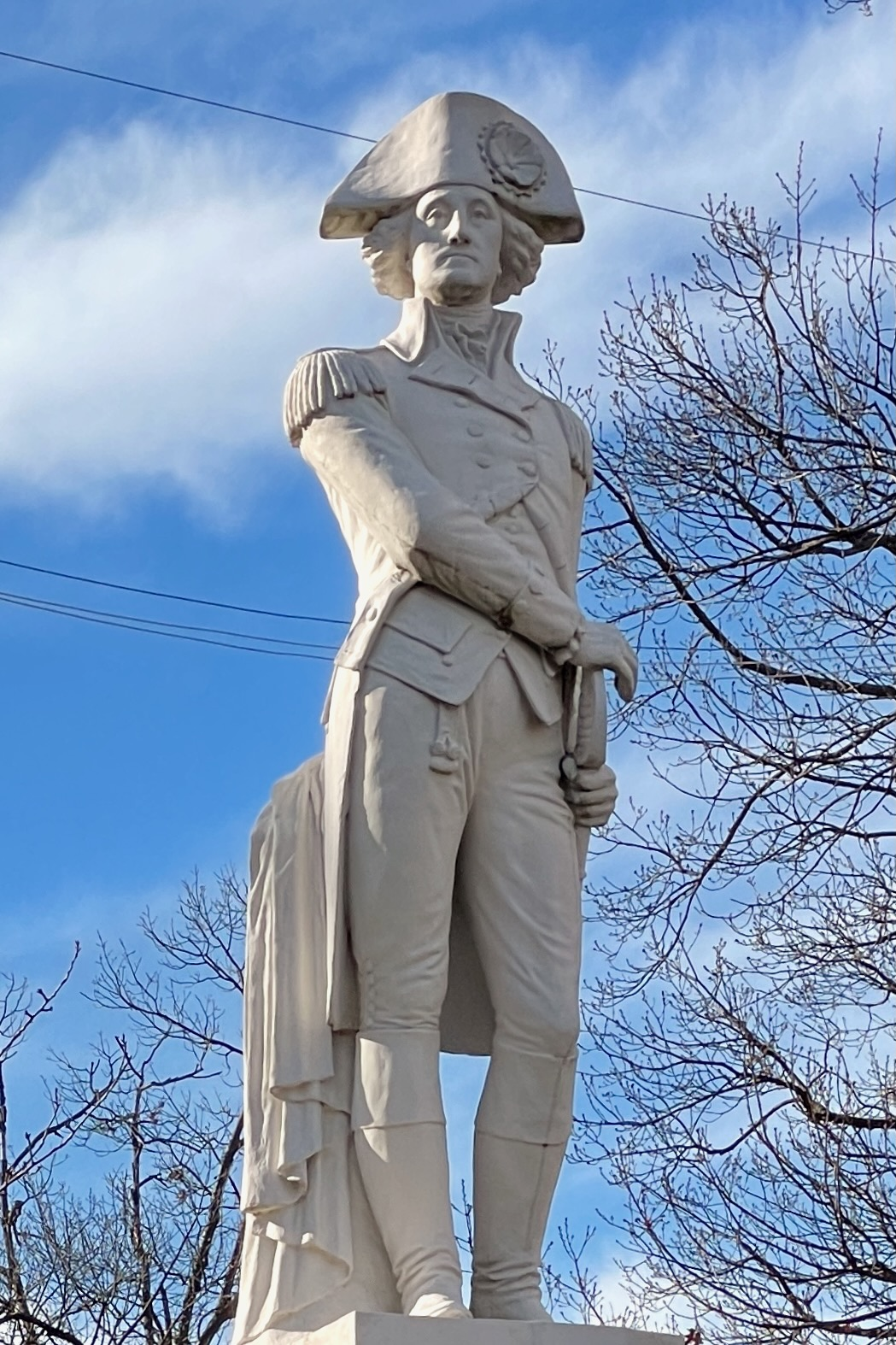
George Washington by Nels N. Alling

Market Square, located across from City Hall, is a park that had been an outdoor marketplace during the Colonial era. Market Square includes a replica of the Liberty Bell, a statue of George Washington, and the Bill of Rights Arch, which commemorates the fact that New Jersey was the first state to ratify the Bill of Rights.

St. Peter's Church, which held its first service in 1685 and received a royal charter in 1718, has been recognized as the first Episcopal congregation in the state. Its current building, dating from the 1850s, is surrounded by a graveyard of early inhabitants and displays a collection of stained-glass windows with religious scenes as well as early depictions of New Jersey receiving her charter and a meeting between William Franklin and his father, Ben.

Perth Amboy was New Jersey's primary inbound port for African slaves.

The Kearny Cottage is a remaining example of 18th-century vernacular architecture. Operated as a historic house museum and operated by the Kearny Cottage Historical Society. Built in 1781 on High Street, the house was moved to Sadowski Parkway in the 1920s, and was later relocated to its current site at 63 Catalpa Avenue, just inland from the mouth of the Raritan River.

During the colonial period and for a significant time thereafter, Perth Amboy was an important way-station for travelers between New York City and Philadelphia, as it was the site of a ferry that crossed the Arthur Kill to Tottenville, Staten Island. The first ferry operated in 1684 and regular service began operating in 1709. This ferry became less important when the Outerbridge Crossing opened in 1928, but continued to operate until 1963. In 1998, the Perth Amboy Ferry Slip was restored to its 1904 appearance. A replica of the ticket office has been constructed and is used as a small museum.

On March 31, 1870, Thomas Mundy Peterson became the first African-American in the United States to vote in an election under the recently enacted provisions of the Fifteenth Amendment to the United States Constitution. Peterson voted in an election to update the Perth Amboy city charter.

=== Industrialization and immigration ===
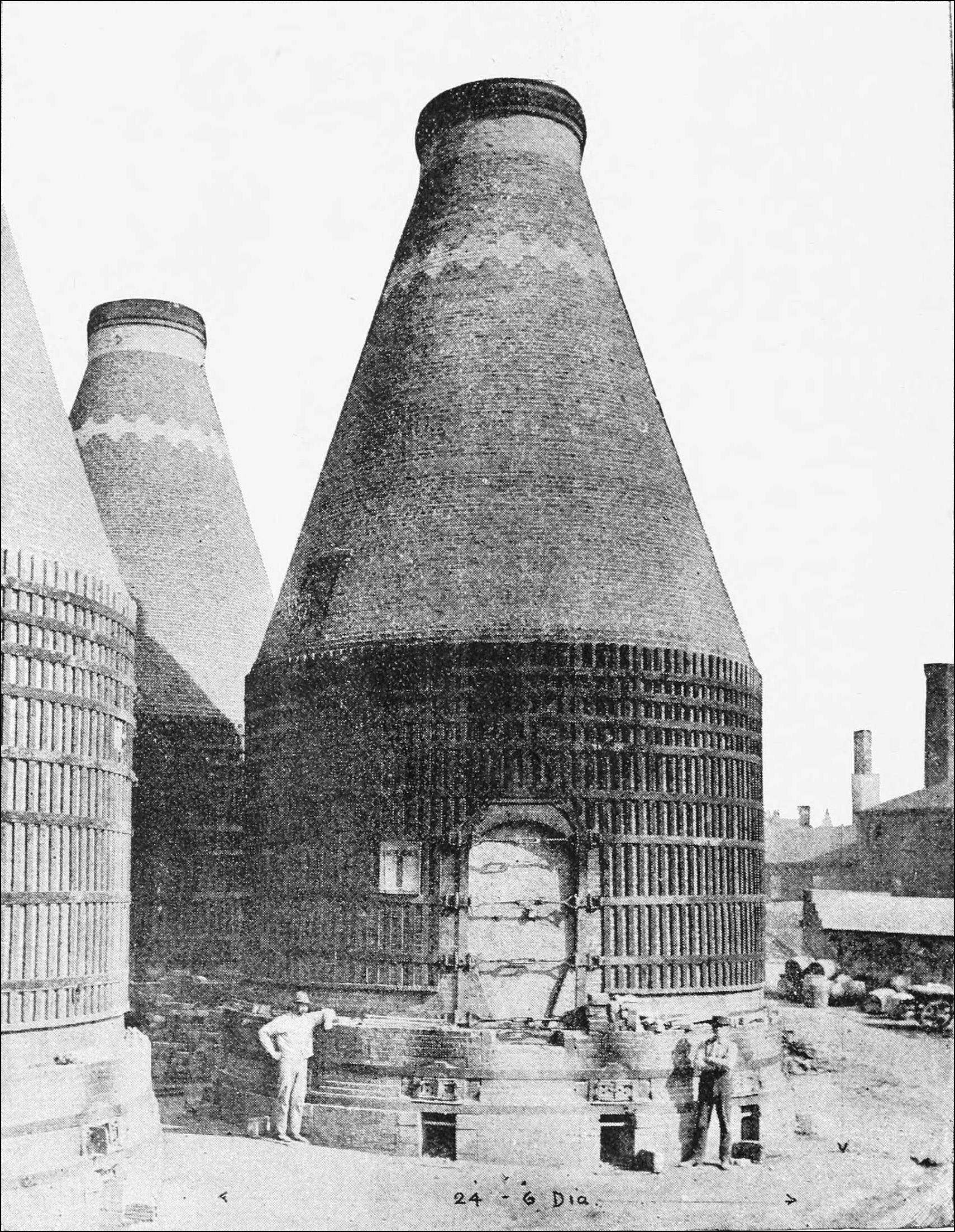
Three kilns at the Perth Amboy Terra Cotta Company

By the middle of the 19th century, immigration and industrialization transformed Perth Amboy. Factories such as A. Hall and Sons Terra Cotta, Guggenheim and Sons and the Copper Works Smelting Company fueled a thriving downtown and employed many area residents. Growth was further stimulated by becoming the tidewater terminal for the Lehigh Valley Railroad and a coal shipping point. Perth Amboy developed tightly-knit and insular ethnic neighborhoods such as Budapest, Dublin, and Chickentown. Immigrants from Denmark, Poland, Hungary, Czechoslovakia, Italy, Russia, and Austria quickly dominated the factory jobs.

In 1903, the Perth Amboy Public Library, one of the first Carnegie libraries in the state, made possible through grants from Andrew Carnegie and donations by local philanthropists, opened to the public.

In 1914, Perth Amboy hosted a minor league baseball team called the Perth Amboy Pacers, who played as members of the Class D level Atlantic League. The Atlantic League folded after one season.

In late August 1923, an estimated 6,000 persons rioted, breaking through police lines after the Ku Klux Klan attempted to organize a meeting in the city.

The city was a resort town in the 19th century and early 20th century, located on the northern edge of the Raritan Bayshore. Since the early 1990s Perth Amboy has seen redevelopment. Small businesses have started to open up, helped by the city's designation as an Urban Enterprise Zone. The waterfront has also seen a rebirth. The marina has been extended, and there are new promenades, parks, and housing overlooking the bay.

The chapter "More Alarms at Night" in humorist James Thurber's biography My Life and Hard Times involves Perth Amboy. One night during his adolescence in Ohio, young Thurber is unable to go to sleep because he cannot remember the name of this New Jersey community. He wakens his father, demanding that he start naming towns in New Jersey. When the startled father names several towns with single-word names, Thurber replies that the name he is seeking is "two words, like helter skelter". This convinces his father that Thurber has become dangerously insane. Thurber also wrote the story later made into the film The Secret Life of Walter Mitty, about an "inconsequential guy from Perth Amboy, New Jersey". Perth Amboy's water pumping station is located in Old Bridge Township.

== Geography ==
According to the U.S. Census Bureau, the city had a total area of 5.93 square miles (15.36 km^{2}), including 4.66 square miles (12.07 km^{2}) of land and 1.27 square miles (3.28 km^{2}) of water (21.37%).

Perth Amboy, and South Amboy across the Raritan River, are collectively referred to as The Amboys. Signage for Exit 11 on the New Jersey Turnpike refers to "The Amboys" as a destination. The Amboys are the northern limit of the area informally referred to as the Bayshore.

Perth Amboy borders Woodbridge (adjacent by land to the north and west), Sayreville (to the southwest, across the Raritan River), South Amboy (south across the upper reaches of Raritan Bay, directly connected only by rail), and the New York City borough of Staten Island (east across the Arthur Kill).

Unincorporated communities, localities and place names located partially or completely within the city include Barber, Eagleswood and Florida Grove.

Perth Amboy sits on a geological layer of clay several hundred feet thick. Consequently, clay mining and factories such as A. Hall and Sons Terra Cotta located in Perth Amboy in the late 19th century.

In its September 2005 issue, Golf Magazine named Perth Amboy the unofficial "Golf Capital of the U.S.", despite the fact that there are no golf courses within the city limits, citing the city's access to 25 of the magazine's Top 100 Golf Courses in the U.S., which can be found within 150 mi (240 km) of Perth Amboy.

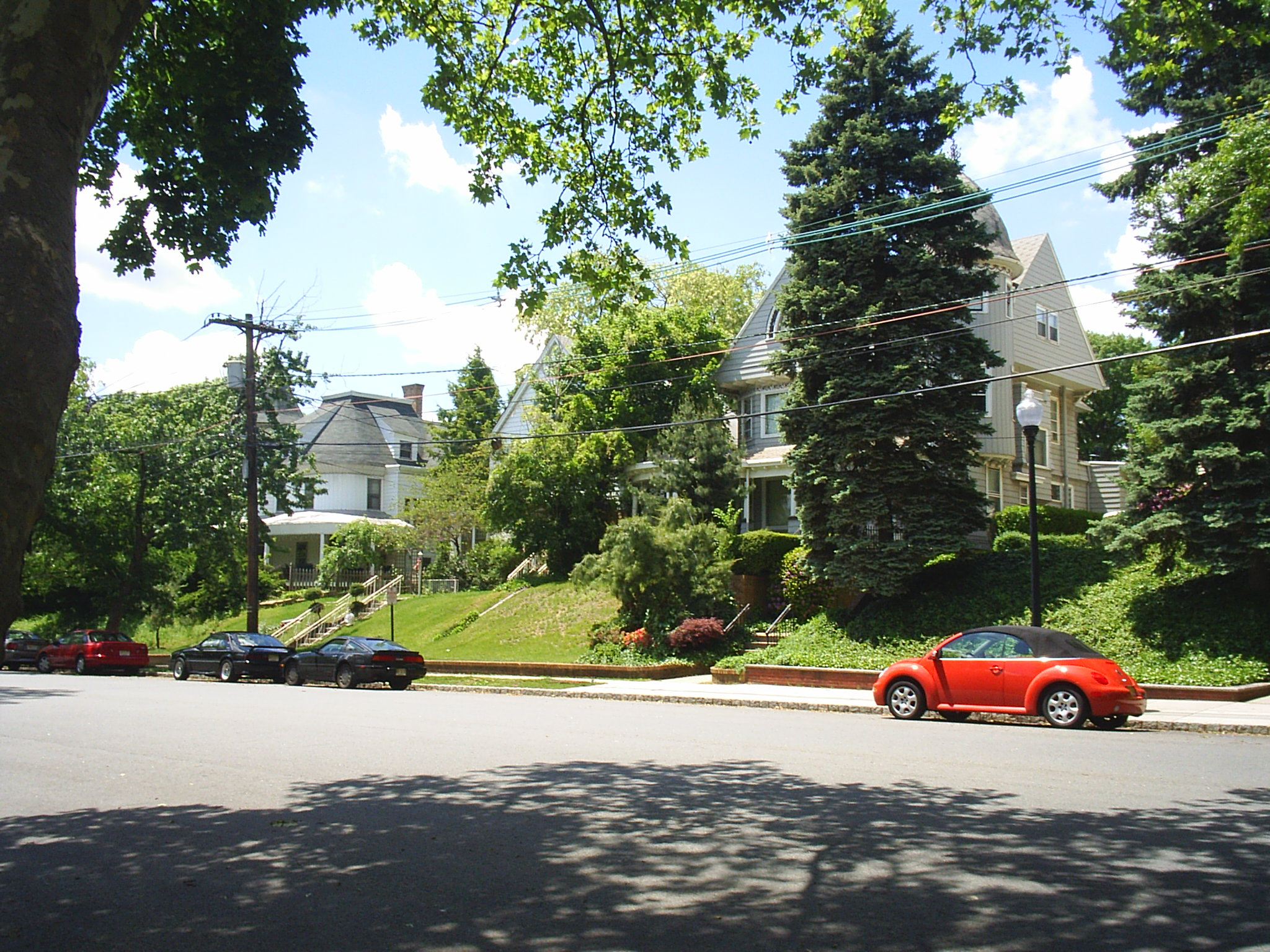
Typical Victorians on High Street

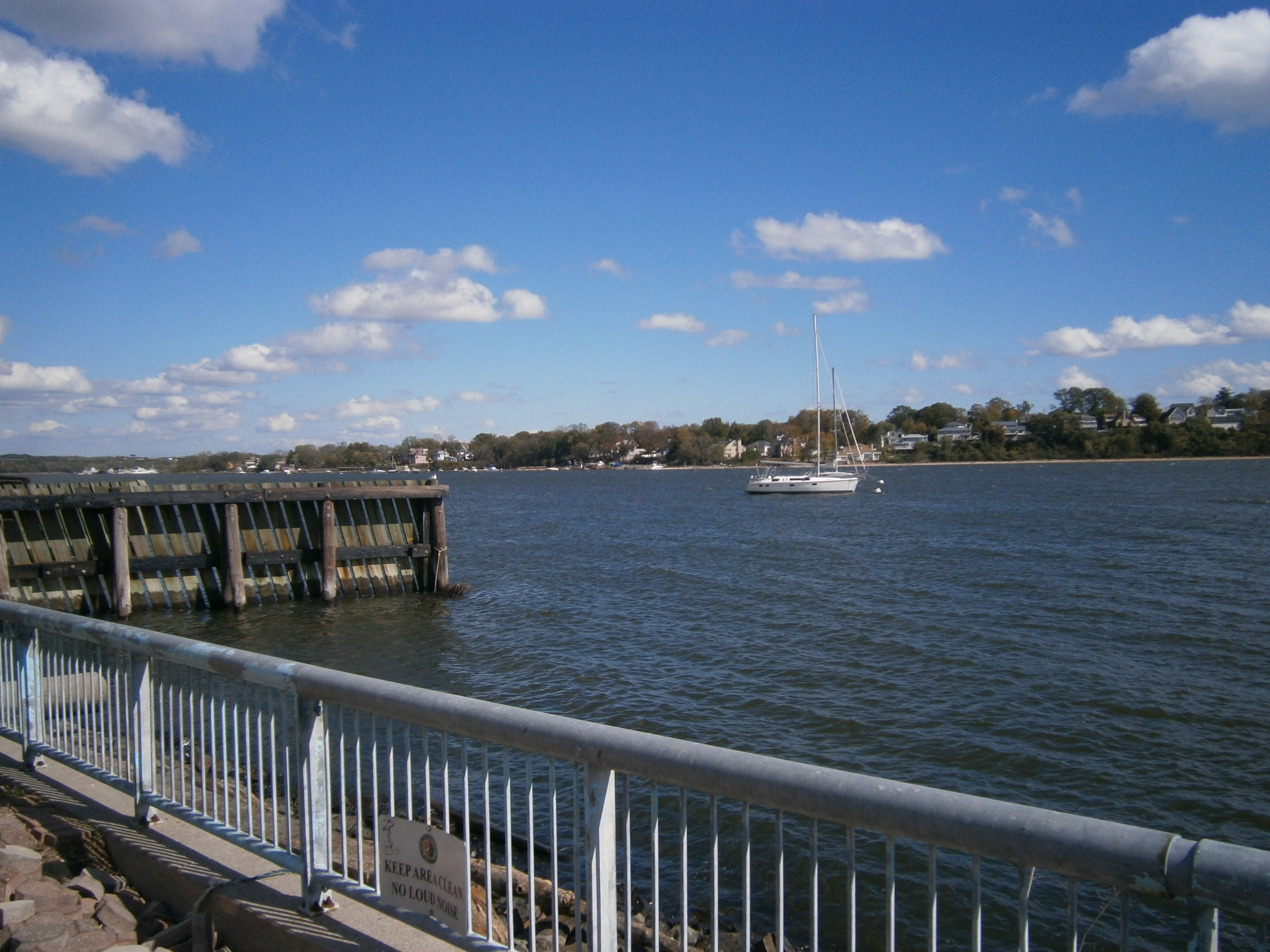
Arthur Kill along waterfront walkway just south of Ferry Slip

=== Waterfront ===
Perth Amboy features a historic waterfront, which has gone through significant revitalization. Local attractions include the Perth Amboy Ferry Slip, two small museums, an art gallery, a yacht club, and a marina. Near the marina lies a park with a small bandshell. On Sunday afternoons in the summertime, Perth Amboy hosts the Concerts by the Bay in the park's bandshell. Every Thursday evening in the summer, Perth Amboy hosts the Mayor's Concert Series in Bayview Park. Perth Amboy also hosts an annual Waterfront Arts Festival. The waterfront is also characterized by a redbrick promenade near the water and many stately Victorian homes, some on hills overlooking the bay and tree lined streets with well-manicured lawns. The land rises steeply after two blocks. This hides the rest of the town, making the waterfront look like a quiet fishing village. Points of interest on the waterfront include St. Peter's Episcopal Church, and the Proprietary House, which is now the former governor's mansion and houses a museum and some offices. Kearny Cottage, which also has a museum, is here. This section of Perth Amboy once had a thriving Jewish community with yeshivas, synagogues, kosher butchers and bakers. Today, however, there are only two synagogues left, each with only a few older members.

A project called 'The Landings at Harborside' was to have featured 2,100 residential units along with indoor parking, 150,000 sq ft (14,000 m^{2}) of retail space, a community center, and recreation amenities for the public as well. However, after meeting with Charles Kushner, the developer who spent two years in prison after being convicted of witness tampering, tax evasion and making illegal campaign contributions, Mayor Wilda Diaz endorsed a scaled-back design concept for the development, allowing Section 8 housing rentals instead of owner-occupied units as originally promised.

The Raritan Yacht Club is the state's second-oldest and one of the oldest yacht clubs in the United States, founded in 1882 from the merger of two older clubs, one founded in 1865 and the other in 1874. Also located on the waterfront and founded in 1917, St. Demetrios was one of the first Greek Orthodox churches in central New Jersey. Established by the Greek immigrants who came to the United States at the turn of the 19th century, this community has stood as a beacon of the Orthodox Faith and Hellenism in Middlesex County.

=== Downtown Perth Amboy ===
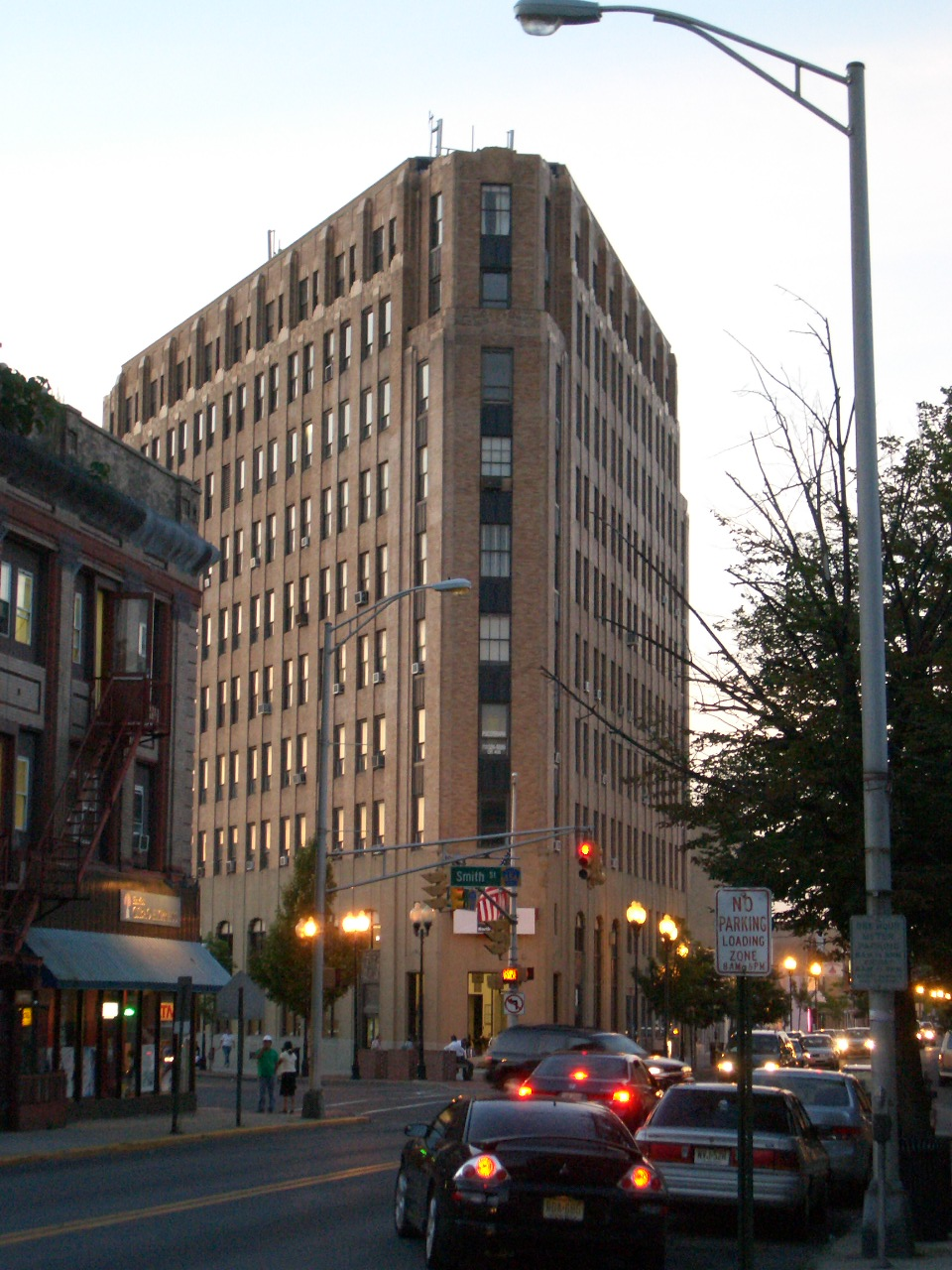
The Perth Amboy National Bank Building at the Five Corners

Perth Amboy was settled by Europeans in 1683 and incorporated as a city in 1718. It was founded by English merchants, Scots seeking religious freedom, and French Protestants, who sought to make use of Perth Amboy's harbor to its full potential. Downtown is the main commercial district, and is centered on Smith Street. It is an Urban Enterprise Zone, and the reduced sales tax rate (half of the statewide rate) funds revitalization of Smith Street with newly planted trees, Victorian streetlights, benches, garbage cans, and redbrick sidewalks. Smith Street is a shopping center seven blocks wide, with stores catering to working-class customers. The street is flanked by mainly two- to three-story buildings of varied architecture. It also has a lone bank skyscraper called 'Amboy Towers', 10 stories tall, located at Five Corners, the intersection of Smith Street, New Brunswick Avenue and State Street. Once home to several department stores downtown, the largest storefront today is a discount retailer.

=== Harbortown ===
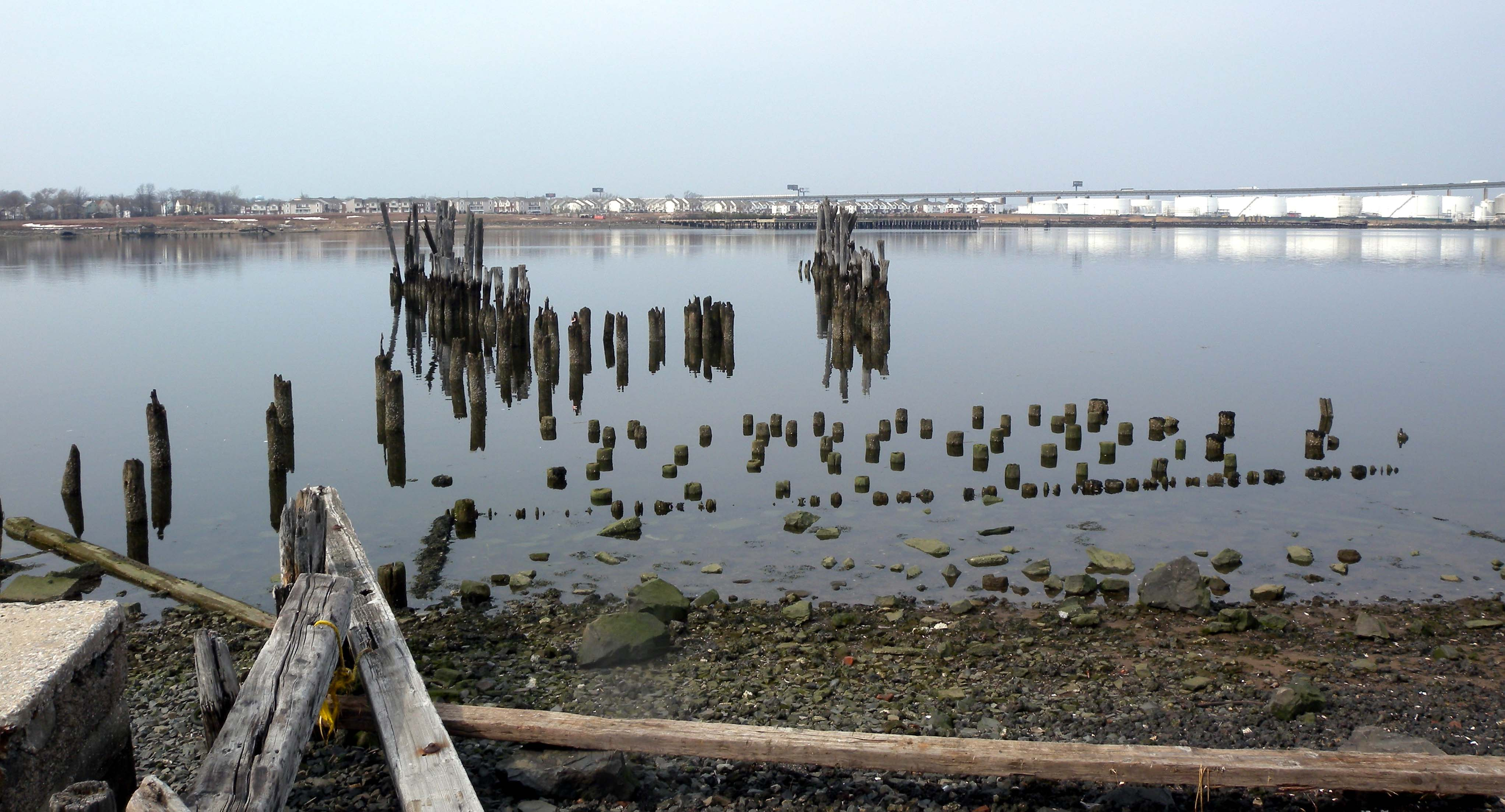
Looking across Arthur Kill to Harbortown (center)

Harbortown is a townhouse development on the waterfront which continues to be expanded since construction started in 1987. "Section 8" housing along with more affluent homes can be found in Harbortown, an economically and ethnically diverse townhouse development in the city.

This area was the Lehigh Valley Railroad marshaling yards where coal was loaded onto barges for shipment to New York City and elsewhere until the LVRR went bankrupt in 1976.

=== Hall Avenue ===
Hall Avenue is a neighborhood centered on Hall Avenue east of the NJ Transit train tracks. The street itself, Hall Avenue, is no longer the commercial strip it once was. However, there is a recently built strip mall on the corner of Hall Avenue and State Street called the "Firehouse Plaza". There is also a "Banco Popular" branch of the bank headquartered in Puerto Rico. However, Hall Avenue is now primarily residential. Most of the homes are aging apartments, but there are also some newly constructed homes. Hall Avenue remains a traditional Puerto Rican neighborhood, and it hosts the city's annual Puerto Rican Day Festival, which is held on the same day of the historic Puerto Rican Day Parade in New York City. Rudyk Park is north of Route 440 and features the Roberto Clemente Baseball Field and an industrial park.

=== Southwestern section ===
The southwestern section is a mainly working-class residential neighborhood with some light industry, once the site of Eagleswood Military Academy. The city's largest strip mall is located here. This neighborhood has a large and diversified Hispanic neighborhood with many Dominicans, Puerto Ricans, and recently, South Americans. Much of the city's Mexican population also lives in this section. Previously, this section of Perth Amboy had a large Irish population and was once named "Dublin". Following the Irish came the Eastern Europeans, primarily Polish and Hungarian. Most of the housing consists of small one- or two-family houses. The main commercial strip is Smith Street, west of the NJ Transit train tracks.

=== Western section ===
The western section of the waterfront is west of Kearny Avenue. It is an overwhelmingly blue-collar Hispanic neighborhood. Most of the homes are over 100 years old; many are modest row houses. Sadowski Parkway Park lines through the southern end of the neighborhood and has a walkway with a beach. The park also hosts the Dominican festival and other festivals during the summer.

=== State Street ===
State Street is a neighborhood east of the NJ Transit train tracks, north of Fayette Street, and south of Harbortown. Like the southwestern section of Perth Amboy, it is predominantly working-class Hispanic. In addition, this neighborhood had many industries and factories before they moved overseas. The neighborhood is mainly Caribbean Hispanic. This section once had a large Cuban community. The State and Fayette Gardens, an apartment complex in the neighborhood, were called "The Cuban Buildings" at one time. The Landings at Harborside redevelopment project is being constructed in this neighborhood.

=== Amboy Avenue ===
Amboy Avenue is a quasi-suburban, working to middle-class neighborhood. It is also referred to as the "Hospital section" or the "High School section" due to the fact that these places are located in the neighborhood. Today most residents are Hispanic; Amboy Avenue once had a strong Italian population.

=== Maurer ===
Maurer is a chiefly working to middle-class neighborhood that lies in the northern part of Route 440. It is heavily industrial with many oil refineries and brownfields. Like Amboy Avenue, it is quasi-suburban.

=== Chickentown ===
Chickentown is a neighborhood in the western part of Route 35 south of Spa Springs, just south of Route 440. It shares many of the same characteristics of Spa Springs but to a lesser extent. The city's largest park, Washington Park, is located here. It received its name from all the chicken farms (hens and eggs) that were located here before World War II.

== Climate ==
Perth Amboy has a humid subtropical climate (Köppen climate classification Cfa) typical of New Jersey with hot, humid summers and cold, wet winters.

Climate data for Perth Amboy, New Jersey
Month	Jan	Feb	Mar	Apr	May	Jun	Jul	Aug	Sep	Oct	Nov	Dec	Year
Mean daily maximum °F (°C)	39 (4)	42 (6)	51 (11)	62 (17)	72 (22)	81 (27)	86 (30)	84 (29)	77 (25)	66 (19)	55 (13)	43 (6)	63 (17)
Mean daily minimum °F (°C)	24 (−4)	26 (−3)	33 (1)	42 (6)	51 (11)	61 (16)	66 (19)	65 (18)	57 (14)	46 (8)	37 (3)	29 (−2)	45 (7)
Average precipitation inches (mm)	3.63 (92)	3.06 (78)	4.13 (105)	4.01 (102)	4.22 (107)	4.21 (107)	5.50 (140)	3.73 (95)	4.57 (116)	4.21 (107)	3.85 (98)	4.00 (102)	49.12 (1,248)

== Demographics ==
Historical population
Census	Pop.	Note	%±
1790	582		—
1810	815		—
1820	798		−2.1%
1830	879		10.2%
1840	1,303		48.2%
1850	1,865		43.1%
1860	2,302		23.4%
1870	2,851		23.8%
1880	4,808		68.6%
1890	9,512		97.8%
1900	17,699		86.1%
1910	32,121		81.5%
1920	41,707		29.8%
1930	43,516		4.3%
1940	41,242		−5.2%
1950	41,330		0.2%
1960	38,007		−8.0%
1970	38,798		2.1%
1980	38,951		0.4%
1990	41,967		7.7%
2000	47,303		12.7%
2010	50,814		7.4%
2020	55,436		9.1%
2023 (est.)	55,249		−0.3%
Population sources:1790–1920 1840 1850–1870 1850; 1870 1880–1890 1850–1930; 1940–2000 2000; 2010 2020

The city is one of many U.S. communities with a majority Hispanic population.

=== 2020 census ===
As of the 2020 census, Perth Amboy had a population of 55,436. The median age was 34.9 years. 26.0% of residents were under the age of 18 and 11.2% of residents were 65 years of age or older. For every 100 females there were 94.7 males, and for every 100 females age 18 and over there were 91.8 males age 18 and over.

100.0% of residents lived in urban areas, while 0.0% lived in rural areas.

There were 17,136 households in Perth Amboy, of which 44.3% had children under the age of 18 living in them. Of all households, 39.0% were married-couple households, 18.4% were households with a male householder and no spouse or partner present, and 34.1% were households with a female householder and no spouse or partner present. About 19.8% of all households were made up of individuals and 7.7% had someone living alone who was 65 years of age or older.

There were 17,855 housing units, of which 4.0% were vacant. The homeowner vacancy rate was 1.1% and the rental vacancy rate was 2.6%.

Racial composition as of the 2020 census
Race	Number	Percent
White	9,650	17.4%
Black or African American	4,583	8.3%
American Indian and Alaska Native	746	1.3%
Asian	662	1.2%
Native Hawaiian and Other Pacific Islander	33	0.1%
Some other race	28,251	51.0%
Two or more races	11,511	20.8%
Hispanic or Latino (of any race)	46,149	83.2%

=== 2010 census ===
The 2010 United States census counted 50,814 people, 15,419 households, and 11,456 families in the city. The population density was 10,806.8 per square mile (4,172.5/km^{2}). There were 16,556 housing units at an average density of 3,521.0 per square mile (1,359.5/km^{2}). The racial makeup was 50.26% (25,541) White, 10.54% (5,358) Black or African American, 1.10% (561) Native American, 1.69% (859) Asian, 0.05% (27) Pacific Islander, 30.77% (15,634) from other races, and 5.58% (2,834) from two or more races. Hispanic or Latino of any race were 78.10% (39,685) of the population. The city's Hispanic population was the second-highest percentage among municipalities in New Jersey as of the 2010 Census, ranked behind Union City with 84.7%.

Of the 15,419 households, 40.0% had children under the age of 18; 40.1% were married couples living together; 24.6% had a female householder with no husband present and 25.7% were non-families. Of all households, 20.3% were made up of individuals and 7.5% had someone living alone who was 65 years of age or older. The average household size was 3.25 and the average family size was 3.65.

27.3% of the population were under the age of 18, 11.0% from 18 to 24, 30.2% from 25 to 44, 22.2% from 45 to 64, and 9.3% who were 65 years of age or older. The median age was 32.4 years. For every 100 females, the population had 97.3 males. For every 100 females ages 18 and older there were 94.3 males.

The Census Bureau's 2006–2010 American Community Survey showed that (in 2010 inflation-adjusted dollars) median household income was $47,696 (with a margin of error of +/− $3,644) and the median family income was $53,792 (+/− $2,943). Males had a median income of $38,485 (+/− $2,450) versus $30,078 (+/− $3,452) for females. The per capita income for the city was $20,162 (+/− $933). About 16.3% of families and 19.4% of the population were below the poverty line, including 28.8% of those under age 18 and 15.2% of those age 65 or over.

=== 2000 census ===
As of the 2000 United States census there were 47,303 people, 14,562 households, and 10,761 families residing in the city. The population density was 9,892.0 inhabitants per square mile (3,819.3/km^{2}). There were 15,236 housing units at an average density of 3,186.2 per square mile (1,230.2/km^{2}). The racial makeup of the city was 46.41% White, 10.04% African American, 0.70% Native American, 1.53% Asian, 0.13% Pacific Islander, 35.59% from other races, and 5.61% from two or more races. Hispanic or Latino of any race were 69.83% of the population.

There were 14,562 households, out of which 40.3% had children under the age of 18 living with them, 44.6% were married couples living together, 21.0% had a female householder with no husband present, and 26.1% were non-families. 20.6% of all households were made up of individuals, and 8.8% had someone living alone who was 65 years of age or older. The average household size was 3.20 and the average family size was 3.63.

In the city the population was spread out, with 28.5% under the age of 18, 11.4% from 18 to 24, 31.6% from 25 to 44, 18.3% from 45 to 64, and 10.2% who were 65 years of age or older. The median age was 31 years. For every 100 females, there were 98.2 males. For every 100 females age 18 and over, there were 94.8 males.

The median income for a household in the city was $37,608, and the median income for a family was $40,740. Males had a median income of $29,399 versus $21,954 for females. The per capita income for the city was $14,989. About 14.3% of families and 17.6% of the population were below the poverty line, including 24.1% of those under age 18 and 12.8% of those age 65 or over.

In 2000, 27.79% of Perth Amboy residents identified themselves as being of Puerto Rican ancestry, the fifth highest concentration of Puerto Ricans on the U.S. mainland of those municipalities with 1,000 or more residents identifying their ancestry. In the same census, 18.81% of Perth Amboy residents identified themselves as being of Dominican ancestry, the third highest concentration in the country of Dominicans in the United States after Haverstraw, New York, and Lawrence, Massachusetts, using the same criteria.

== Economy ==
Portions of the city are part of an Urban Enterprise Zone (UEZ), one of 32 zones covering 37 municipalities statewide. The city was selected in 1994 as one of a group of 10 zones added to participate in the program. In addition to other benefits to encourage employment within the UEZ, shoppers can take advantage of a reduced 3.3125% sales tax rate (half of the 6 5/8% rate charged statewide) at eligible merchants. Established in October 1994, the city's Urban Enterprise Zone status expires in October 2025. As of 2023, hundreds of millions of dollars were being invested in the redevelopment of Perth Amboy's waterfront area, in part related to its strategically-located industrial area.

== Government ==
=== Local government ===
The City of Perth Amboy is governed under the Mayor-Council system of municipal government under the Faulkner Act. The city is one of 71 municipalities (of the 564) statewide governed under this form. The governing body is comprised of the Mayor and the City Council, all of whom are elected at-large on a partisan basis. The city council includes five members, who are elected to four-year terms of office on a staggered basis, with either two or three seats coming up for election in alternating even-numbered years. The mayor also serves a four-year term of office, which is up for election the same year that two council seats are up for vote. In October 2010, the City Council voted to shift the city's non-partisan elections from May to November, with the first balloting held in conjunction with the General Election in November 2012. In November 2023, voters approved a referendum to switch from non-partisan to partisan elections.

As of 2025, the mayor of Perth Amboy is Democrat Helmin J. Caba, whose term of office ends December 31, 2028. Caba defeated former three-term mayor Wilda Diaz who had served 12 years in office from 2008 to 2020. After trailing behind incumbent mayor Wilda Diaz by 33%-30% (a margin of more than 400 votes) in the November 2020 general election, he won the mayoral runoff election against Wilda Diaz on December 15, 2020. Members of the City Council are Hailey V. Cruz (2026), Rose B. Morales (D, 2028), Stacey Peralta (D, 2028), Kenneth Puccio (2026), Milady Tejeda (2026).

In the November 2014 general election, Fernando Gonzalez came in third place, winning the final seat up for election ahead of Sergio Diaz by nine votes. In March 2015, a Superior Court judge ordered a special election between Diaz and Gonzalez after finding that votes had been illegally cast and that there was evidence of fraud in mail voting. In the special election, Gonzalez beat Diaz by a 112-vote margin.

=== Federal, state and county representation ===
Perth Amboy is located in the 6th Congressional District and is part of New Jersey's 19th state legislative district.

For the 119th United States Congress, New Jersey's 6th congressional district is represented by Frank Pallone (D, Long Branch). New Jersey is represented in the United States Senate by Democrats Cory Booker (Newark, term ends 2027) and Andy Kim (Moorestown, term ends 2031).

For the 2026–2027 session, the 19th legislative district of the New Jersey Legislature is represented in the State Senate by Joe F. Vitale (D, Woodbridge Township) and in the General Assembly by Craig Coughlin (D, Woodbridge Township) and Yvonne Lopez (D, Perth Amboy).

Middlesex County is governed by a Board of County Commissioners, whose seven members are elected at-large on a partisan basis to serve three-year terms of office on a staggered basis, with either two or three seats coming up for election each year as part of the November general election. At an annual reorganization meeting held in January, the board selects from among its members a commissioner director and deputy director. As of 2025, Middlesex County's Commissioners (with party affiliation, term-end year, and residence listed in parentheses) are:

Director Ronald G. Rios (D, Carteret, 2027), Deputy Director Shanti Narra (D, North Brunswick, 2027), Claribel A. "Clary" Azcona-Barber (D, New Brunswick, 2025), Charles Kenny (D, Woodbridge Township, 2025), Leslie Koppel (D, Monroe Township, 2026), Chanelle Scott McCullum (D, Piscataway, 2025) and Charles E. Tomaro (D, Edison, 2026).

Constitutional officers are: Clerk Nancy Pinkin (D, 2025, East Brunswick), Sheriff Mildred S. Scott (D, 2025, Piscataway) and Surrogate Claribel Cortes (D, 2026; North Brunswick).

=== Politics ===
As of March 2011, there were a total of 22,737 registered voters in Perth Amboy, of which 9,212 (40.5%) were registered as Democrats, 1,022 (4.5%) were registered as Republicans and 12,500 (55.0%) were registered as Unaffiliated. There were 3 voters registered to either the Libertarian Party or the Green Party.

United States presidential election results for Perth Amboy
Year	Republican		Democratic		Third party(ies)	
Year	No.	%	No.	%	No.	%
2024	6,209	44.65%	7,430	53.43%	268	1.93%
2020	4,246	27.79%	10,929	71.53%	104	0.68%
2016	2,278	16.91%	10,915	81.01%	281	2.09%
2012	1,667	12.31%	11,774	86.95%	100	0.74%
2008	2,261	16.94%	10,999	82.38%	91	0.68%
2004	3,359	27.73%	8,677	71.62%	79	0.65%
2000	2,065	19.69%	8,212	78.30%	211	2.01%

In the 2012 presidential election, Democrat Barack Obama received 87.0% of the vote (11,774 cast), ahead of Republican Mitt Romney with 12.3% (1,667 votes), and other candidates with 0.7% (100 votes), among the 13,869 ballots cast by the city's 24,253 registered voters (328 ballots were spoiled), for a turnout of 57.2%. In the 2008 presidential election, Democrat Barack Obama received 81.6% of the vote (10,999 cast), ahead of Republican John McCain with 16.8% (2,261 votes) and other candidates with 0.7% (91 votes), among the 13,473 ballots cast by the city's 23,248 registered voters, for a turnout of 58.0%. In the 2004 presidential election, Democrat John Kerry received 71.0% of the vote (8,677 ballots cast), outpolling Republican George W. Bush with 27.5% (3,359 votes) and other candidates with 0.4% (79 votes), among the 12,223 ballots cast by the city's 21,686 registered voters, for a turnout percentage of 56.4.

Gubernatorial election results for Perth Amboy
Year	Republican		Democratic		Third party(ies)	
Year	No.	%	No.	%	No.	%
2025	1,849	21.58%	6,647	77.59%	71	0.83%
2021	1,415	25.20%	4,148	73.87%	52	0.93%
2017	928	16.78%	4,513	81.59%	90	1.63%
2013	2,014	35.57%	3,574	63.12%	74	1.31%
2009	1,611	24.66%	4,645	71.09%	278	4.25%
2005	1,297	19.27%	5,157	76.62%	277	4.12%

In the 2013 gubernatorial election, Democrat Barbara Buono received 63.1% of the vote (3,574 cast), ahead of Republican Chris Christie with 35.6% (2,014 votes), and other candidates with 1.3% (74 votes), among the 5,915 ballots cast by the city's 24,593 registered voters (253 ballots were spoiled), for a turnout of 24.1%. In the 2009 gubernatorial election, Democrat Jon Corzine received 69.8% of the vote (4,645 ballots cast), ahead of Republican Chris Christie with 24.2% (1,611 votes), Independent Chris Daggett with 3.4% (228 votes) and other candidates with 0.8% (50 votes), among the 6,654 ballots cast by the city's 22,185 registered voters, yielding a 30.0% turnout.

United States Senate election results for Perth Amboy1
Year	Republican		Democratic		Third party(ies)	
Year	No.	%	No.	%	No.	%
2024	3,936	33.75%	7,170	61.48%	557	4.78%
2018	1,525	16.27%	7,662	81.76%	184	1.96%
2012	1,210	10.18%	10,529	88.62%	142	1.20%
2006	1,130	17.43%	5,252	81.01%	101	1.56%

United States Senate election results for Perth Amboy2
Year	Republican		Democratic		Third party(ies)	
Year	No.	%	No.	%	No.	%
2020	3,056	20.95%	10,989	75.33%	542	3.72%
2014	841	15.89%	4,356	82.28%	97	1.83%
2013	555	18.20%	2,448	80.29%	46	1.51%
2008	1,832	16.48%	9,073	81.64%	209	1.88%

== Transportation ==
=== Roads and highways ===
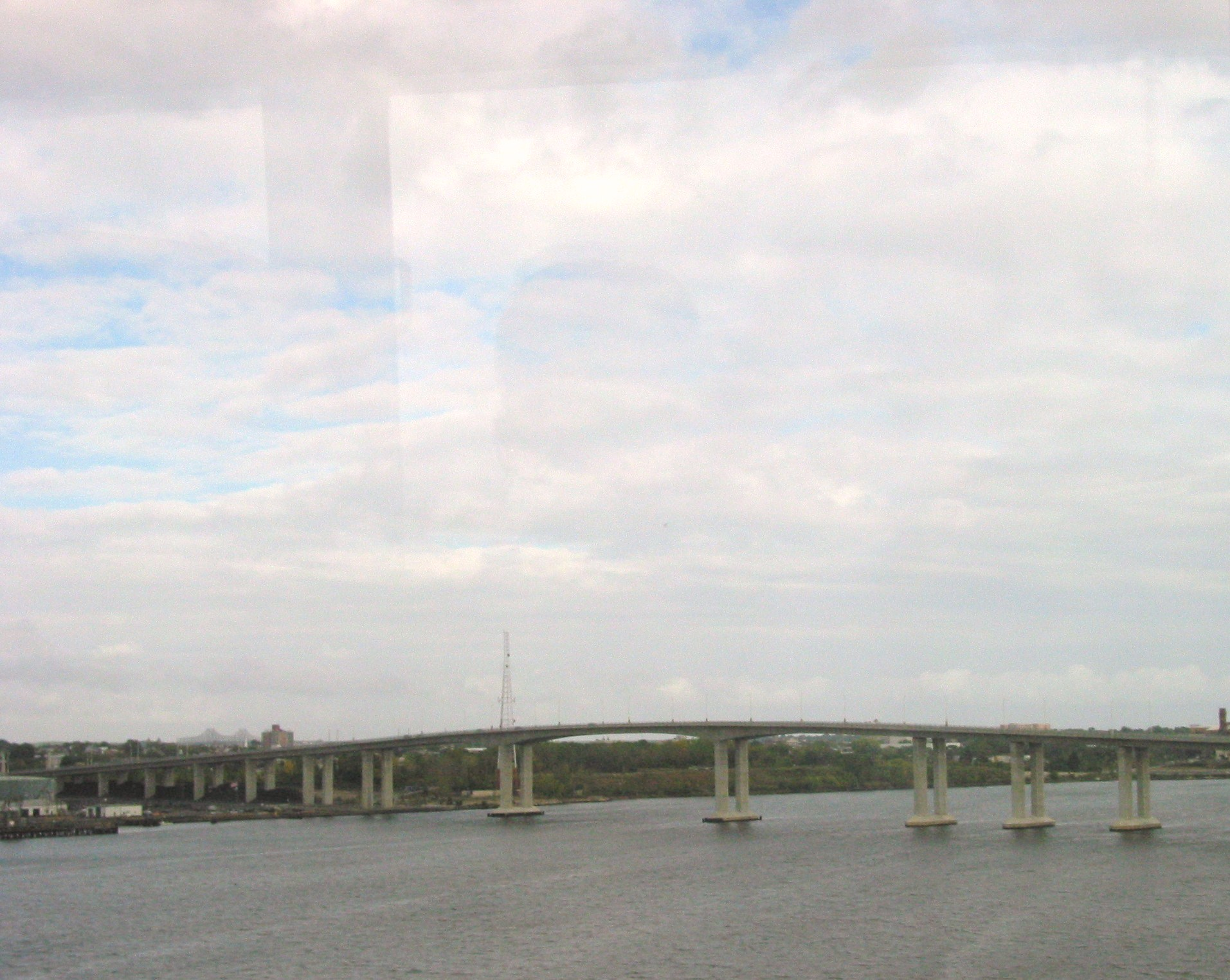
Victory Bridge from US 9

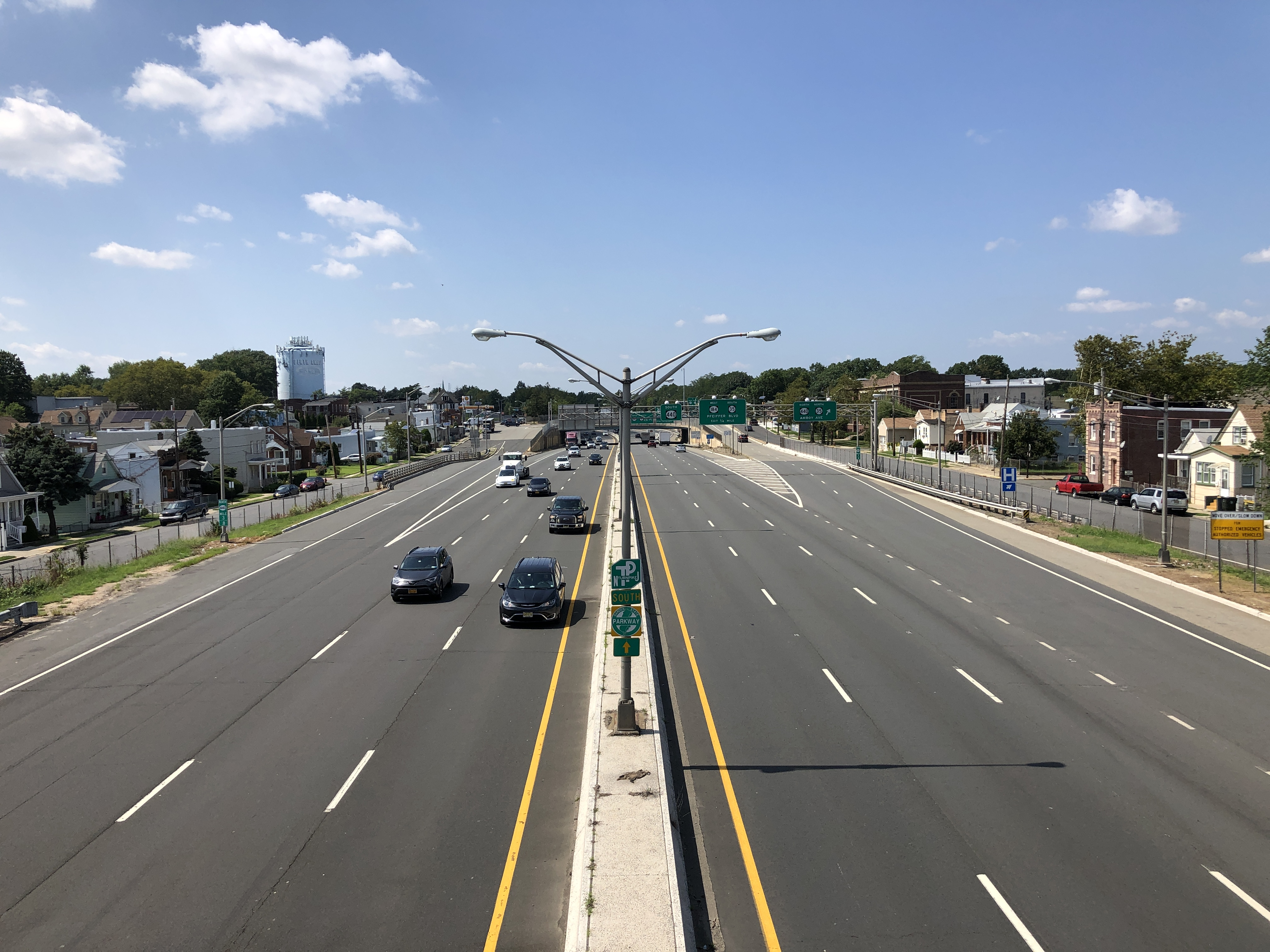
View south along Route 440, the largest and busiest highway in Perth Amboy

As of March 2019, the city had a total of 75.14 miles (120.93 km) of roadways, of which 58.59 miles (94.29 km) were maintained by the municipality, 11.11 miles (17.88 km) by Middlesex County, 4.27 miles (6.87 km) by the New Jersey Department of Transportation and 1.17 miles (1.88 km) by the Port Authority of New York and New Jersey.

The city is crisscrossed by many many major roads and highways. Major roads in the city include Route 35 Route 184, Route 440, CR 501 and CR 616.

The Outerbridge Crossing, which opened to traffic on June 29, 1928, is a cantilever bridge over the Arthur Kill that connects Perth Amboy with Staten Island. Known locally as the "Outerbridge", it is part of a major route on NY-440 / NJ-440 from the south and west to New York City and Long Island. Despite the assumption that the name is derived from its location as the southernmost bridge in New York State and Staten Island, the Outerbridge Crossing was named in honor of Eugenius H. Outerbridge, first Chairman of the Port Authority. The bridge clears the channel by 143 ft (44 m), providing passage for some of the largest ships entering the Port of New York and New Jersey.

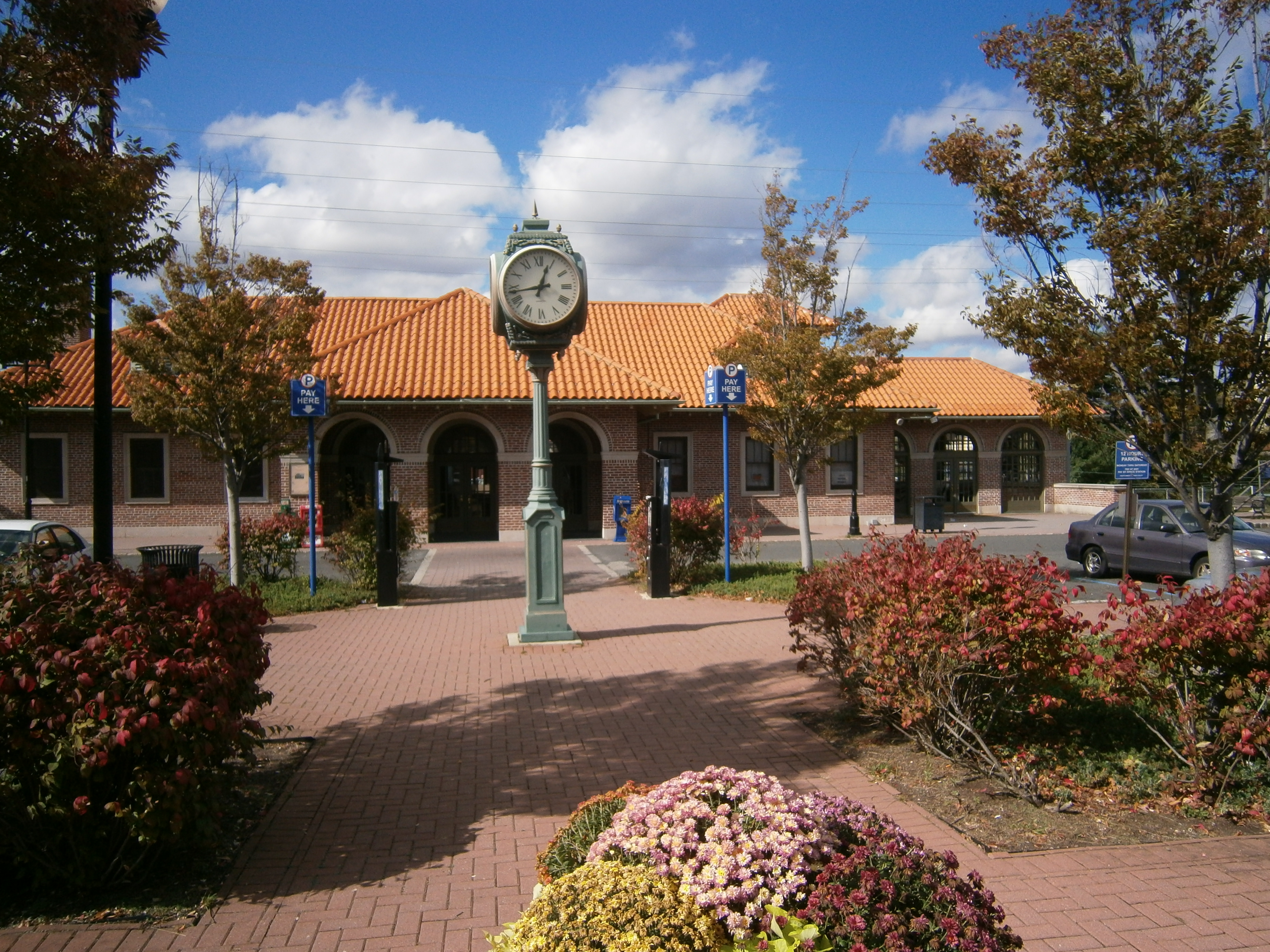
Main entrance of Perth Amboy Station

The Victory Bridge carries Route 35 over the Raritan River, connecting Perth Amboy on the north with Sayreville to the south. From the time of its construction in 1926 until the Edison Bridge was completed in 1939, all traffic heading across the Raritan River was funneled through the Victory Bridge, whose original single-span swing bridge was replaced under a project completed in 2005 that provides two spans of traffic, including a 134-metre (440 ft) main span that was the longest precast cantilever segmental construction in the United States at the time of its construction.

=== Public transportation ===
The city has NJ Transit train service at Perth Amboy station. The station provides service on the North Jersey Coast Line to Newark Penn Station, Hoboken Terminal, Secaucus Junction, New York Penn Station and the Jersey Shore.

NJ Transit buses serve the Port Authority Bus Terminal on the 116 route, Elizabeth on the 48 line, with local service available on the 813, 815, and 817 bus routes.

=== Bicycle regulation ===
Since 1939, legal use of a bicycle in Perth Amboy requires a license issued by the Perth Amboy police department. The purchase and sale of used bicycles must be reported to the Perth Amboy police department. Any person operating a business engaged in the sale or purchase of new or used bicycles must file a daily report with the Chief of Police detailing the particulars of all transactions. There is at least one bicycle shop in Perth Amboy.

== Education ==
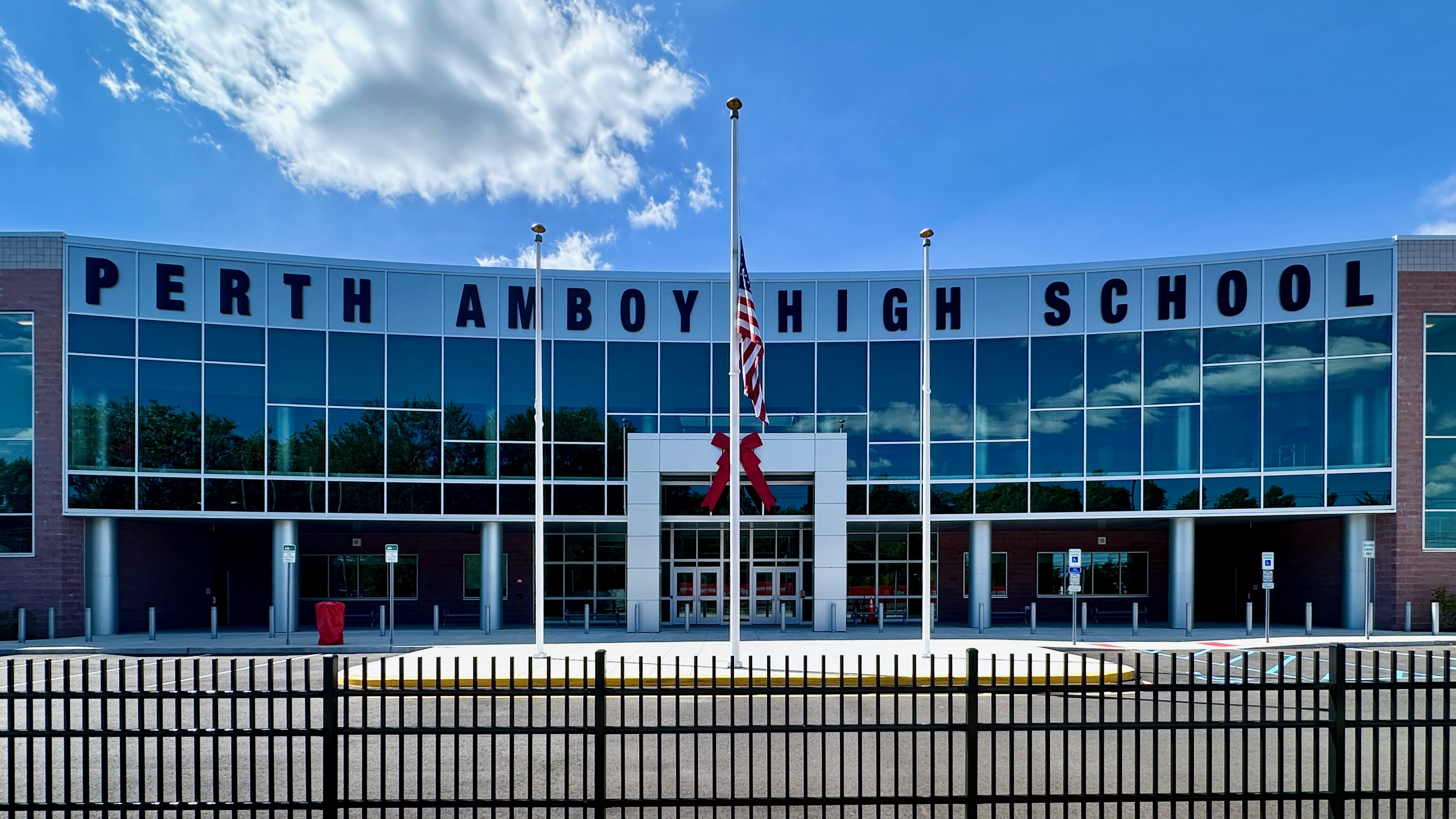
Perth Amboy High School

Public schools in Perth Amboy are operated by Perth Amboy Public Schools, serving students in pre-kindergarten through twelfth grade. The district is one of 31 former Abbott districts statewide that were established pursuant to the decision by the New Jersey Supreme Court in Abbott v. Burke which are now referred to as "SDA Districts" based on the requirement for the state to cover all costs for school building and renovation projects in these districts under the supervision of the New Jersey Schools Development Authority.

As of the 2020–21 school year, the district, comprised of 12 schools, had an enrollment of 10,786 students and 898.7 classroom teachers (on an FTE basis), for a student–teacher ratio of 12.0:1. Schools in the district (with 2020–21 enrollment data from the National Center for Education Statistics) are Ignacio Cruz Early Childhood Center (with 667 students in Pre-K), Edmund Hmieleski Jr. Early Childhood Center (362; Pre-K), School #7 Early Childhood Center (NA; Pre-K), Anthony V. Ceres Elementary School (581; K–4), James J. Flynn Elementary School (550; K–4), Rose M. Lopez Elementary School (812; K–3), Edward J. Patten Elementary Elementary School (660; K–4), Dr. Herbert N. Richardson 21st Century Elementary School (491; K–4), Robert N. Wilentz Elementary School (637; K–4), Dual Language School (397; 4–8), William C. McGinnis Middle School (1,398; 5–8), Samuel E. Shull Middle School (1,410; 5–8) and Perth Amboy High School (2,547; 9–12).

Based on data from the 2013–2017 American Community Survey, 14.5% of adults over the age of 25 in Perth Amboy have a bachelor's degree or higher, a percentage significantly below the state average of 38.9% and the 42.7% of those in Middlesex County.

The Academy for Urban Leadership Charter High School is a public high school serving grades 7–12 open since September 2010, operating independently of the Perth Amboy Public Schools under the terms of a charter granted by the New Jersey Department of Education. The school opened with one hundred 9th graders, with plans to add a class of 100 students each year until it reached its goal of 400 students in grades 9–12 by the 2013–2014 school year and has since added grades 7 and 8. As of the 2021–22 school year, the school had an enrollment of 414 students and 39.0 classroom teachers (on an FTE basis), for a student–teacher ratio of 10.6:1.

Eighth grade students from all of Middlesex County are eligible to apply to attend the high school programs offered by the Middlesex County Magnet Schools, a county-wide vocational school district that offers full-time career and technical education at its schools in East Brunswick, Edison, Perth Amboy, Piscataway and Woodbridge Township, with no tuition charged to students for attendance.

Assumption Catholic School (Pre-K–8) and Perth Amboy Catholic Primary School / Upper School (Pre-K–8) operate under the supervision of Roman Catholic Diocese of Metuchen.

In 1903, the Perth Amboy Public Library became the first Carnegie library in the state, made possible through a grant of $20,000 from Andrew Carnegie Foundation and donations from local philanthropists, which were supplemented in 1914 by an additional $30,000 in Carnegie grants to pay for two additional reading rooms. The library reopened in 2015 after a $2 million renovation project that kept the library closed for more than two years.

== Notable people ==
People who were born in, residents of, or otherwise closely associated with Perth Amboy include:

- Soren Sorensen Adams (1879–1963), inventor and manufacturer of novelty products, including the joy buzzer
- Garth Ancier (born 1957), media executive best known for being one of only two people to have programmed three of the five US broadcast television networks
- Solomon Andrews (1806–1872), creator of the first successful dirigible airship; served three terms as mayor of Perth Amboy
- Carolyn Aronson (born 1966), hair care entrepreneur
- Mike Baumgartner (1922–1991), bobsledder who competed in the Four-man event at the 1964 Winter Olympics
- Jay Bellamy (born 1972), safety who played in the NFL for the Seattle Seahawks and the New Orleans Saints
- Jon Bon Jovi (born 1962), singer was born in Perth Amboy
- Padi Boyd, astrophysicist who is the head of NASA's Exoplanets and Stellar Astrophysics Laboratory
- Kelly J. Breen (born 1969), trainer of thoroughbred racehorses
- Malcolm Brenner (born 1951), author, journalist and zoophile
- Miles Browning (1897–1954), officer in the United States Navy in the Atlantic during World War I and in the Pacific during World War II who was a pioneer in the development of aircraft carrier combat operations concepts
- Frank Buckiewicz (1930–2017), football player and coach who served as the head football coach at Pacific University from 1965 to 1980
- Johnny Buff (1888–1955), boxer who was world bantamweight champion from 1921 to 1922
- Anne Casale (1930–2002, class of 1948), cookbook author and cooking teacher
- Karen A. Cerulo (born 1957), sociologist specializing in the study of culture, communication and cognition
- Alan Cheuse (1940–2015), writer
- Steve Christiansen (born 1956), rower who competed in the men's eight event at the 1976 Summer Olympics
- Stanley Norman Cohen (born 1935), co-creator of the first genetically modified organism and the process of recombinant DNA technology
- Lewis Compton (1892–1942), Assistant Secretary of the Navy from 1940 to 1941
- Craig Coughlin (born 1958), politician who has represented the 19th Legislative District in the New Jersey General Assembly since 2010 and has served as the Speaker of the General Assembly since 2018
- Flora Parker DeHaven (1883–1950), actress and mother of actress Gloria DeHaven
- Linda Deutsch (1943–2024), journalist who worked for the Associated Press
- Thomas J. Deverin (1921–2010), politician who served 11 terms in the New Jersey General Assembly, from 1970 to 1992
- Cora Du Bois (1903–1991), cultural anthropologist
- William Dunlap (1766–1839), theater pioneer
- Bernard J. Dwyer (1921–1998, class of 1938), politician, who served in the United States House of Representatives from New Jersey from 1981 to 1993
- Walt Flanagan (born 1967), comic book artist and podcaster, creator of One True Three
- Bill Flynn (born 1938), politician who served in the New Jersey General Assembly from 1974 to 1986
- William Franklin (1730–1813), last governor of Province of New Jersey
- Arthur Franz (1920–2006), actor
- Elsie Frost (1919– 2003), American educator who was a children's advocate and wife of James A. Frost
- Charles Goldstein (1936–2015), real estate lawyer who headed the Commission for Art Recovery, which helped recover $160 million of Nazi plunder and stolen art by the time of his death
- Thomas Gordon (1652–1722), lawyer who served as Chief Justice of the New Jersey Supreme Court and New Jersey Attorney General for the Province of New Jersey
- Angelina Grimké (1805–1879) and Sarah Grimké (1792–1873), abolitionists
- Vida Guerra (born 1974), model, was born in Cuba but was raised in Perth Amboy
- Gene Hubka (1924–2017), American football tailback who played for the Pittsburgh Steelers
- George Inness (1825–1894), landscape painter
- Augustus Johnston (1729–1790), Rhode Island Attorney General, Tory sympathizer
- Lewis B. Kaden, businessman, attorney, legal scholar, and former political advisor who served as vice chairman of Citigroup from 2005 to 2013
- Lawrence Kearny (1789–1868), the "Sailor Diplomat", who paved the way for an open-door policy with China
- Edward L. Kemeys (1843–1907), sculptor in residence at Eagleswood Mansion
- Morgan Foster Larson (1882–1961), Governor of New Jersey from 1929 to 1932
- Yvonne Lopez (born 1957), politician who has represented the 19th Legislative District in the New Jersey General Assembly since 2018
- Miilkbone (born 1974 as Thomas Wlodarczyk), rapper
- Walter Mitty, fictional character from the 1947 film The Secret Life of Walter Mitty
- Steve Mizerak (1944–2006), champion pool player
- Joseph Montani (PAHS, 1970), astronomer and planetary scientist who named the minor planet "12465 Perth Amboy" after his hometown
- John A. Nagy (1946–2016), author of books about espionage and mutinies of the American Revolution
- Maria, Lady Nugent (1770/71 – 1834), diarist, first lady of Jamaica
- George Otlowski (1912–2009), politician who served as mayor of the city from 1976 to 1990
- Thomas H. Paterniti (1929–2017), dentist and politician who served as Mayor of Edison and in both houses of the New Jersey Legislature
- Edward J. Patten (1905–1994), lawyer and politician who represented New Jersey's 15th congressional district in the United States House of Representatives from 1963 until 1981
- Will Pennyfeather (born 1968), former center fielder for the Pittsburgh Pirates
- Thomas Mundy Peterson (1824–1904), first African-American to vote under the provisions of the 15th Amendment to the U.S. constitution in 1870
- Bony Ramirez (born 1996), self-taught painter and visual artist
- Joseph J. Sadowski (1917–1944), United States Army soldier awarded the Medal of Honor for his actions in World War II
- Richie Sambora (born 1959), guitarist for Bon Jovi, was born here
- Arthur J. Sills (1917–1982), attorney who served as New Jersey Attorney General from 1962 to 1970
- Danny Silva (born 1973), cross-country skier who represented Portugal at the Winter Olympics in 2002 and 2006,
- Dave Smigelsky (born 1959), former American football punter who played for the Atlanta Falcons of the National Football League and Washington Federals of the United States Football League
- Joann H. Smith (1934–1998), politician who served in the New Jersey General Assembly from the 13th Legislative District from 1986 to 1998
- Marcus Spring (1810–1874), founder of Raritan Bay Union and Eagleswood Military Academy
- Steve Stanko (1917–1978), heavyweight weightlifter and bodybuilder who was crowned Mr. America in 1944 and Mr. Universe in 1947
- John Stevens (c. 1715–1792), colonial American landowner, merchant and politician who was a delegate to the Continental Congress from New Jersey
- John Stevens (1749–1838), engineer who developed the multitubular boiler engine and the screw propeller
- Alec John Such (1951–2022), musician who was best known as a founding member of the rock band Bon Jovi, and as their bass player from 1983 to 1994
- Bruce Taylor (born 1948), former NFL player
- Brian Taylor (born 1951), former professional basketball player who played for the New York Nets and three other teams in his 10-year career in the NBA
- Harry Tierney (1890–1965), composer
- Marc Turtletaub (born 1946), movie producer and former president and CEO of The Money Store
- Marcus Valdez (born 1999), professional football defensive lineman for the Montreal Alouettes of the Canadian Football League
- John Watson (1685–1768), one of the first painters in the United States
- Ruth White (1914–1969), Emmy Award winning television, stage and motion picture actress
- William Adee Whitehead (1810–1884), historian, surveyor, customs official and public servant
- Amy Wilentz (born 1954), writer
- David T. Wilentz (1894–1988), N.J. Attorney General from 1934 to 1944, who prosecuted Bruno Hauptmann in the Lindbergh kidnapping trial
- Robert Wilentz (1927–1996), Chief Justice of New Jersey Supreme Court from 1979 to 1996
- Warren W. Wilentz (1924–2010), attorney and politician
- Blenda Wilson (born 1941), university president and education executive who was the first African-American woman to lead a large (over 25,000 students) university in the United States
- John Wisniewski (born 1962), politician who served in the New Jersey General Assembly from 1996 to 2018, where he represented the 19th Legislative District

== Sister cities ==
- Caldas da Rainha, Portugal
- Hillsdale, Michigan

== See also ==
- ASARCO
- King's Highway
