= James R. Hendrix =

United States Army Medal of Honor recipient (1925–2002)

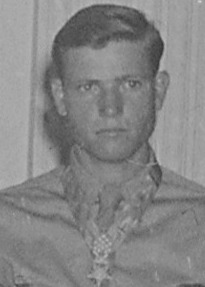
- James Hendrix after receiving his Medal of Honor from President Harry S. Truman on August 13, 1945
- Born: August 20, 1925; Lepanto, Arkansas, US
- Died: November 14, 2002 (aged 77); Davenport, Florida, US
- Burial place: Florida National Cemetery, Bushnell, Florida
- Military career
- Allegiance: United States of America
- Branch: United States Army
- Service years: 1943–1966
- Rank: Master sergeant
- Units: 53rd Armored Infantry Battalion, 4th Armored Division
- Conflicts: World War II; Korean War; Vietnam War
- Awards: Medal of Honor

James Richard Hendrix (August 20, 1925 – November 14, 2002) was a United States Army master sergeant and a recipient of the United States military's highest decoration for valor—the Medal of Honor—for his actions in Belgium during World War II.

== Biography ==
Hendrix was born and raised in Lepanto, Arkansas, the oldest child of a sharecropper with fourteen children. He left elementary school at West Side after the third grade to work in the fields in order to help his family at home. He learned marksmanship skills while hunting for food. In 1943, at age 18, he was drafted into the U.S. Army. He was sent to basic training in Florida, the first time he had been more than a few miles from his hometown. He became a member of the 4th Armored Division after basic training.

He was sent to Europe as a private with Company C, 53rd Armored Infantry Battalion, 4th Armored Division. After waiting out the invasion of Normandy aboard ship in the English Channel, the 4th AD landed on Utah Beach on June 11, 1944, and joined the drive across France and into Belgium as the spearhead of General George Patton's Third Army.

During the Battle of the Bulge, on December 26, 1944, near Assenois, Belgium, Hendrix, a bazooka man, captured two enemy artillery guncrews, and armed with a rifle, held off the fire of two machine guns until wounded comrades could be evacuated, and then rescued a soldier from a burning vehicle. He was presented the Medal of Honor by President Truman at a White House ceremony on August 23, 1945; he was awarded the medal on September 1, 1945.

Hendrix re-enlisted in 1945, and became a paratrooper; during parachute training he broke his leg when his chute failed to open. He reached the rank of master sergeant and served in combat with a parachute unit during the Korean War and served briefly during the Vietnam War before retiring from the Army in 1966. He died of cancer at age 77 and was buried in the Florida National Cemetery, Bushnell, Florida.

== Medal of Honor citation ==
Hendrix's official Medal of Honor citation reads:

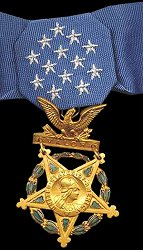
Medal of Honor

On the night of 26 December 1944, near Assenois, Belgium, he was with the leading element engaged in the final thrust to break through to the besieged garrison at Bastogne when halted by a fierce combination of artillery and small arms fire. He dismounted from his half-track and advanced against two 88mm. guns, and, by the ferocity of his rifle fire, compelled the guncrews to take cover and then to surrender. Later in the attack he again left his vehicle, voluntarily, to aid 2 wounded soldiers, helpless and exposed to intense machinegun fire. Effectively silencing 2 hostile machineguns, he held off the enemy by his own fire until the wounded men were evacuated. Pvt. Hendrix again distinguished himself when he hastened to the aid of still another soldier who was trapped in a burning half-track. Braving enemy sniper fire and exploding mines and ammunition in the vehicle, he extricated the wounded man and extinguished his flaming clothing, thereby saving the life of his fellow soldier. Pvt. Hendrix, by his superb courage and heroism, exemplified the highest traditions of the military service.

== Awards and decorations ==

Badge	Combat Infantry Badge		
1st row	Medal of Honor	Bronze Star Medal	Purple Heart
2nd row	Army Good Conduct Medal	American Campaign Medal	European–African–Middle Eastern Campaign Medal with two campaign stars
3rd row	World War II Victory Medal	Army of Occupation Medal	National Defense Service Medal with one oak leaf cluster
Badge	Parachutists Badge		

== See also ==
- List of Medal of Honor recipients for World War II
- James H. Fields
- Joseph J. Sadowski
