= Valhey =

- Commune
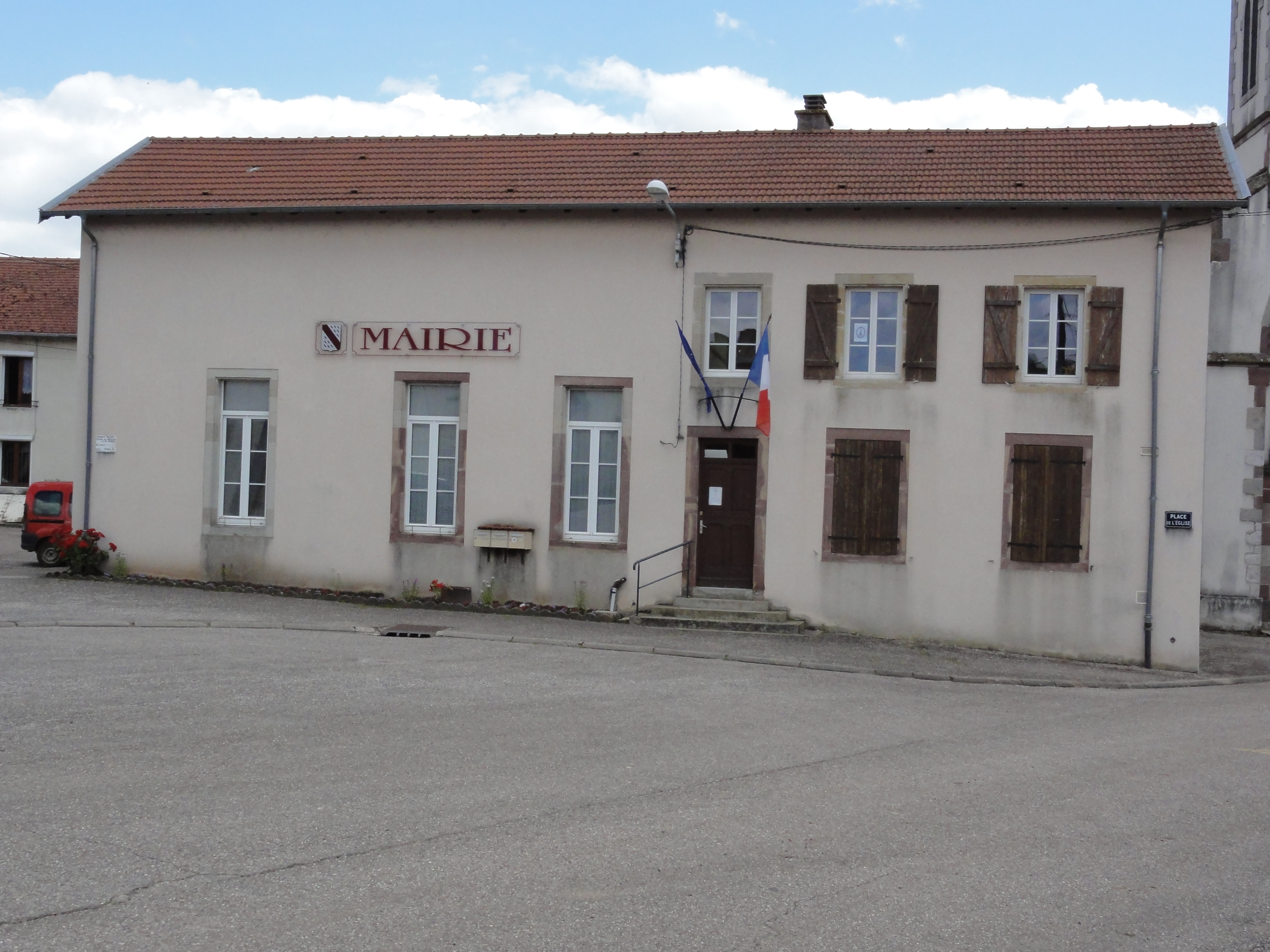
- The town hall in Valhey

- Coat of arms
- Location of Valhey
- Location within France Location within Grand Est
- Coordinates: 48°40′48″N 6°29′31″E
- Country: France
- Region: Grand Est
- Department: Meurthe-et-Moselle
- Arrondissement: Lunéville
- Canton: Lunéville-1
- Intercommunality: Pays du Sânon

Government
  - Mayor (2020–2026): Jean-Charles Braconot
- Area^{1}: 6.23 km^{2} (2.41 sq mi)
- Elevation: 240 m (790 ft)
- Highest elevation: 320 m (1,050 ft)
- Lowest elevation: 224 m (735 ft)
- Population (2023): 158
  - Density: 25.4/km^{2} (65.7/sq mi)
- Time zone: UTC+01:00 (CET)
  - Summer (DST): UTC+02:00 (CEST)
- INSEE/Postal code: 54541 /54370
- ^{1} French Land Register data, which excludes lakes, ponds, glaciers > 1 km^{2} (0.386 sq mi or 247 acres) and river estuaries.

Valhey (French pronunciation: [valɛ]) is a commune in the Meurthe-et-Moselle department in north-eastern France.

== See also ==
- Communes of the Meurthe-et-Moselle department
