= Neighborhoods in Perth Amboy, New Jersey =

Neighborhoods in Middlesex County, New Jersey, US

Perth Amboy, New Jersey is located at the mouth of the Raritan River and the Arthur Kill at the Raritan Bay, and is part of the region known as the Raritan Bayshore.

== Neighborhoods ==
=== The Waterfront ===
Perth Amboy features a historic waterfront, which has gone through significant revitalization. Perth Amboy's waterfront is where the city was first settled and one of the few places left in New Jersey that has a historic and marina culture surrounded by water. Local attractions include two small museums, an art gallery, a yacht club, and a marina. Near the marina lies a park with a small bandshell. On Sunday afternoons in the summertime, Perth Amboy hosts the Concerts by the Bay in the park's bandshell. The waterfront is also characterized by a redbrick promenade near the water and many stately Victorian homes, some on hills overlooking the bay and predominating tree lined streets with well-manicured lawns. It has a number of seafood restaurants, as well. The waterfront rises very steep after two blocks. This hinders the rest of the town making the waterfront look like a quiet fishing village. Points of interest on the waterfront include St. Peter’s Episcopal Church, and the Proprietary House, which is now the former governor’s mansion and houses a museum and some offices. Kearny Cottage, which also has a museum, is here. In addition, this section of Perth Amboy once had a thriving Jewish community with yeshivas, synagogues, kosher butchers and bakers. Today however there are only two synagogues left each with only a few members usually over the age of 55.

=== Waterfront West ===
The western section of the waterfront is west of Kearny Avenue. It is an overwhelmingly blue-collar Hispanic neighborhood. Most of the homes are over 100 years old and many are modest row houses. Sadowski Parkway Park lines through the southern end of the neighborhood and has a walkway with a beach. The beach however is no longer in use for swimming. The park also hosts the Dominican festival and other festivals during the summer.

=== Downtown Perth Amboy ===
Downtown is the main commercial district and is centered on Smith Street. It is an Urban Enterprise Zone and the reduced sales tax rate of 3 1/2% (half of the statewide rate of 7%) funds revitalization of Smith Street with newly planted trees, Victorian streetlights, benches, garbage cans, and redbrick sidewalks. Smith Street is a relatively small shopping center that is only seven blocks wide and bustles with stores catering to working-class customers. The street is flanked by mainly two- to three-storey buildings of varied architecture. It also has a lone bank skyscraper which is 10 stories tall called Amboy Towers in the Five Corners. The Five Corners is the intersection of Smith Street, New Brunswick Avenue and State Street. Although there were previously several department stores downtown, the largest today is discount retailer Bargain Man.

=== The Gateway neighborhood ===
The Gateway neighborhood is located in the southwest. The area is located west of the New Jersey Transit train tracks.

Gateway is named so not only because it is at the main entrance of the city (Rt. 35 and Smith St.) but also it is point of entry for many of the immigrants arriving to Perth Amboy. Once named Dublin because it was an Irish neighborhood, it has been re-branded to give it a more accurate name. There is an Eastern European influence here (including Sipo's Bakery and Joe's Meat Market). However the neighborhood is predominantly Latino with businesses catering to this demographic. The area is diverse with Jamaican and Portuguese eateries however the main groups are Dominicans, Mexicans and Peruvians.

=== The Barber Section ===
The Barber Section is a neighborhood centered on Hall Avenue east of the New Jersey Transit train tracks. Its northern boundary is the border near Sewaren, it is bounded by the south by Lehigh Valley RR. To the east is the water and to the west is the NJ Transit RR. THe neighborhood includes Harbortown Terrace, a part-rental, part-condo housing development near the Arthur Kill. Long home to the Puerto Rican population in the city, it hosts the three-day Puerto Rican festival in Rudyk Park, which coincides on the same Sunday when the historic Puerto Rican Day Parade in New York City is held. There is a Puerto Rican population, as well as Dominicans and Mexicans in the neighborhood.

=== State Street ===
State Street is a neighborhood east of the NJ Transit train tracks, north of Fayette Street, and south of Harbortown. Like the southwestern section of Perth Amboy, it is predominantly working-class Hispanic. In addition, this neighborhood had many industries and factories before they moved overseas. The neighborhood is mainly Caribbean Hispanic. This section also once had a visible Cuban community. The State and Fayette Gardens, an apartment complex in the neighborhood, was at one point considered to be "The Cuban Buildings." The Landings at Harborside redevelopment project is being constructed in this neighborhood.

=== Amboy Avenue ===
Amboy Ave is a quasi-suburban, working to middle-class neighborhood. It is also referred to as the "Hospital section" or the "High School section" because these places are located in the neighborhood. Although today it is mostly Hispanic, Amboy Avenue once had a strong Italian population.

=== Budapest ===
Budapest as the name suggests was once a Hungarian neighborhood. Today, the neighborhood is heavily Latino with other ethnicities including Portuguese, African Americans, and Eastern Europeans. It is mainly working to middle-class neighborhood that lies in the northern part of Route 440. It is heavily industrial with many oil refineries and brownfields. Like Amboy Avenue, it is quasi-suburban.

=== Chickentown ===
Chickentown is a neighborhood in the western part of Route 35 south of Spa Springs, just south of Route 440. It shares many of the same characteristics of Spa Springs but to a lesser extent. The city's largest park, Washington Park, is located here.

=== Spa Springs ===
Along with the waterfront, Spa Springs, which is in the northwestern part of the city, remains one of the most attractive and middle-class areas of the city. In this neighborhood, the population is older. Spa Springs is also the wealthiest neighborhood in town and is the most suburban with single-family houses and garages.

=== Goat Hill ===
Goat Hill was a small neighborhood of Perth Amboy near the waterfront, located slightly north of Hartford Street. The term was most popular from the 1890 to 1950.

== See also ==
- List of neighborhoods in Woodbridge Township, New Jersey
- List of neighborhoods in Edison, New Jersey
