= Murder of Jimmy Hendricks and Kim Mills =

Unsolved homicide case in Missouri, United States

- Hendricks and Mills prior to their disappearances
- Date: June 17, 1978
- Location: Pemiscot County, Missouri, United States
- Cause: Homicide by firearm
- Participants: Jimmy Hendricks (fatality); Kim Mills (fatality); Unidentified subject(s) (perpetrator)
- Outcome: Identified; Jimmy was identified in May 2017. Kim was positively identified on February 2, 2018.
- Deaths: 2
- Inquiries: Active investigation

James Hendricks and Kimberlin Mills are American murder victims who were discovered on June 17, 1978. The pair were believed to have been seen together at a truck stop in Missouri, which is where the murders are presumed to have taken place. Hendricks was left at the crime scene, while Mills was found in Mississippi County, Arkansas.

Hendricks was identified in May 2017; Mills's identity was confirmed in late 2017, and publicly released in early February 2018. Neither had been reported missing. Both were from Michigan.

== Case ==
The bodies later identified as Hendricks and Mills were discovered on June 17, 1978, in Pemiscot County, Missouri, and Blytheville, Arkansas, respectively. Although they were found fifteen miles from each other, they were likely murdered by the same person, as the pair were reportedly seen together before the murders at a truck stop in the same town and were believed to have been dropped off by a man.

Due to flooding, their case files were damaged, including the loss of their fingerprint records, although their dental charts and DNA information remained intact. In September 2017, both victims were identified.

=== Victims ===
Hendricks's age range was between 25 and his early 30s; this placed his birth between c. 1948 and 1953. He was discovered in Pemiscot County, Missouri, where it is believed the murders took place. He had blue eyes, brown hair and a light complexion with freckles. Hendricks had a tattoo on his right arm, which consisted of the letters "J" and "H", later found to be his initials. He was estimated to be 5 feet 8 inches (1.73 m) tall and weighing 130 to 140 pounds (59 to 64 kg). He had a distinctive vertical scar on his forehead, the cause of which was unknown. He wore a red shirt containing a graphic of a woman enclosed inside a circle, with the words "hot sauce" underneath. Other clothing included size nine or ten boots and blue jeans. Some of his teeth were reported to have been missing.

Unlike Mills, who was shot once, Hendricks had suffered three bullet wounds to his neck and head. Mills was determined to be between the ages of 18 and 25, although possibly as old as 35; this placed her birth between c. 1943 and 1960. Her hair was naturally brown, but was likely dyed blond, as its color was darker toward the roots. The word "Kim" was amateurishly tattooed on her right arm; this was speculated, before her identification, to have been her own or her child's name, as her autopsy concluded that she had borne at least one child. Some of her teeth had yet to erupt. She was shot once in the head with a shotgun. Her possessions included a mercury dime necklace and a multicolored striped shirt and jeans.

== Identification ==
Hendricks's identity was confirmed first, in May 2017. His DNA was matched to his sister June. Additionally, his fingerprints were linked to those taken by the Michigan Department of Corrections; Hendricks had served a prison term in Michigan for an unspecified offense. After his relatives were contacted by police with questions about his female companion, they informed the investigators of his girlfriend at the time. Mills's brother's DNA was later obtained and was matched to her remains in February 2018. The couple had not been reported missing due to the belief that they left Michigan due to Hendricks's parole agreement. The pair had planned to leave for Texas and return home after seven years, according to Hendricks's sister.

== See also ==
- List of solved missing person cases: 1950–1999
- List of unsolved murders (1900–1979)
