= William F. Hyland =

American politician (1923-2013)

Bill Hyland
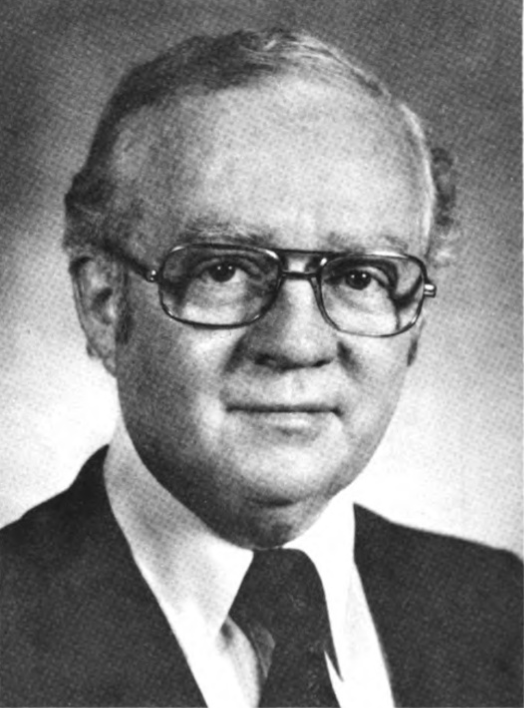
- Hyland c. 1974

Attorney General of New Jersey
- In office January 15, 1974 – January 17, 1978
- Governor: Brendan Byrne
- Preceded by: George F. Kugler Jr.
- Succeeded by: John J. Degnan

Speaker of the New Jersey General Assembly
- In office 1958–1958
- Preceded by: Elden Mills
- Succeeded by: William Kurtz

President of the New Jersey Board of Public Utilities
- In office 1961–1968
- Governor: Robert B. Meyner

Chair of the New Jersey State Commission of Investigation
- In office 1969–1971
- Governor: Richard J. Hughes; William T. Cahill
- Preceded by: Office created

Member of the New Jersey General Assembly
- In office 1954–1961

Personal details
- Born: July 30, 1923 Burlington, New Jersey, U.S.
- Died: March 2, 2013 (aged 89)
- Party: Democratic
- Education: University of Pennsylvania

William F. 'Bill' Hyland (July 30, 1923 – March 2, 2013) was an American lawyer and Democratic Party politician who served as Speaker of the New Jersey General Assembly and Attorney General of New Jersey. Later in life he was a partner in the law firm of Riker Danzig and the executor of the estate of Benny Goodman.

== Biography ==
Hyland was born in Burlington, New Jersey in 1923. He graduated from the Wharton School of the University of Pennsylvania in 1944. From a young age he was an accomplished clarinetist, and he worked his way through college by playing with dance bands.

During World War II, he served as a Lieutenant (junior grade) in the United States Navy. He took part in convoy duty in the Battle of the Atlantic, as well as in the Battle of Iwo Jima and the Battle of Luzon.

Hyland graduated from University of Pennsylvania Law School in 1949 and was admitted to the New Jersey Bar in the same year. He became involved in Democratic politics in Camden County, and was elected to the New Jersey General Assembly in 1954. He served as Speaker of the Assembly in 1958.

Hyland resigned from the Assembly in 1961 when he was nominated by Governor Robert B. Meyner to be the president of the New Jersey Board of Public Utilities. Hyland was one of Meyner's choices to succeed him as the Democratic nominee for Governor of New Jersey in 1961, but he lost the nomination to Richard J. Hughes.

He continued serving on the Public Utilities Board until 1968, when he resigned to return to his law practice in Camden. He returned to public service when Governor Hughes nominated him to be the chairman of the newly created New Jersey State Commission of Investigation. The Commission succeeded in jailing reputed leaders of organized crime on contempt of court charges for refusing to divulge knowledge of criminal activities.

In 1970 Hyland resigned and again returned to his private law practice. In December 1973, Governor-elect Brendan Byrne nominated Hyland as Attorney General of New Jersey. He served from 1974 to 1978, and then joined the law firm Riker, Danzig, Scherer, Debvois and Hyland (later known as Riker, Danzig, Scherer, Hyland & Perretti). He retired from the firm in 2006.

Hyland continued performing as a clarinetist even while serving as Attorney General. In 1976, he had the opportunity to play with Benny Goodman, and the two struck up a friendship. Goodman named him the legal and musical consultant for his estate, responsible for deciding which previously unreleased recordings were appropriate for release. Upon Goodman's death in 1986, Hyland served as executor of his estate.

He died on March 3, 2013.

Political offices
Preceded by Elden Mills	Speaker of the New Jersey General Assembly; 1958	Succeeded by William Kurtz
Legal offices
Preceded by George F. Kugler Jr.	Attorney General of New Jersey; 1974 – 1978	Succeeded by John J. Degnan
