= Perth Amboy High School =

High school in Middlesex County, New Jersey, US

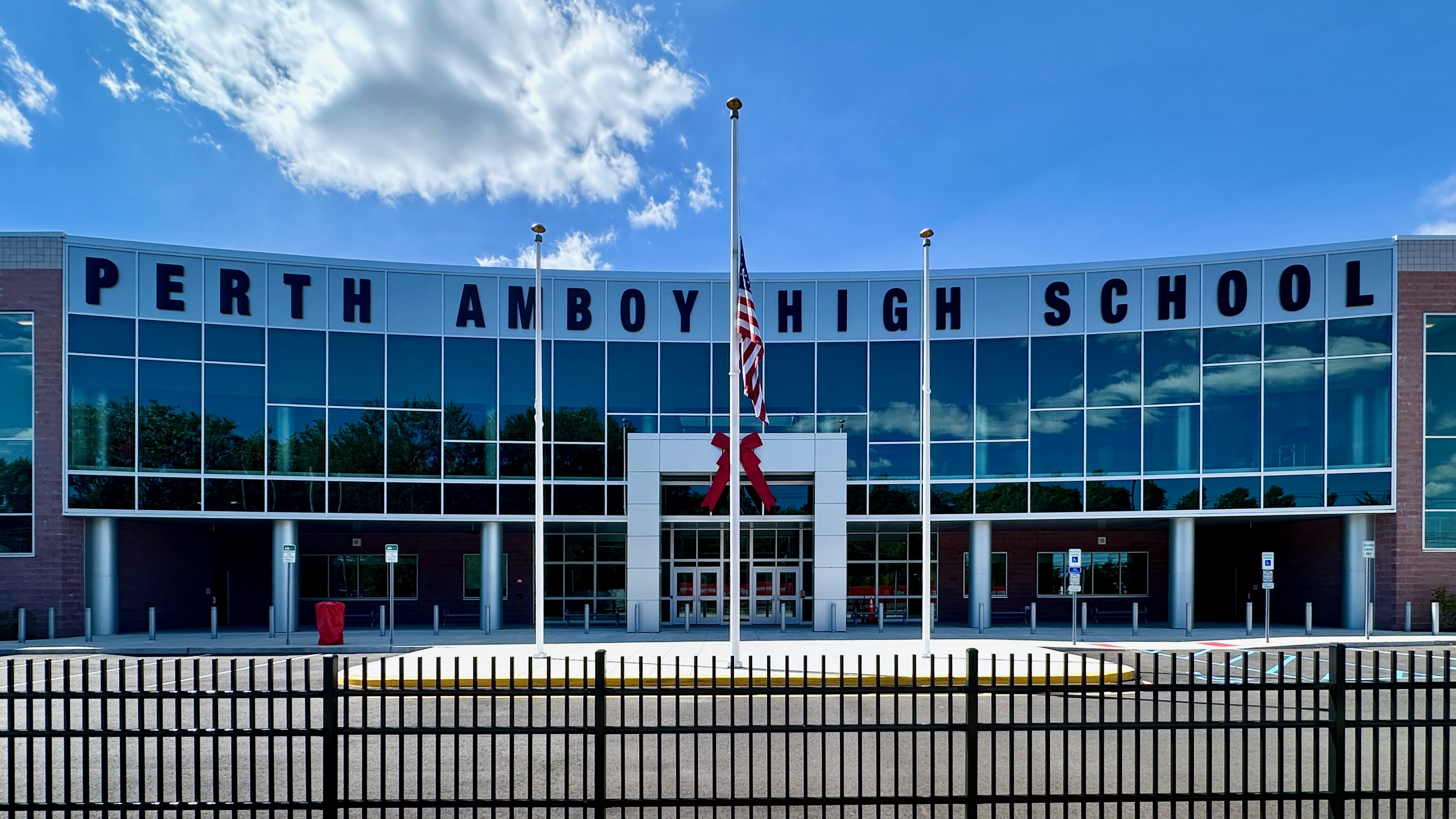

Location
- 931 Convery Boulevard; Perth Amboy, Middlesex County, New Jersey 08861; United States; 40.523323°N 74.269857°W

Information
- Type: Public high school
- Established: 1881
- School district: Perth Amboy Public Schools
- NCES School ID: 341293003530
- Principal: Charles Ezell
- Faculty: 187.5 FTEs
- Grades: 9–12
- Enrollment: 2,769 (as of 2024–25)
- Student to teacher ratio: 14.8:1
- Colors: Red and white
- Athletics conference: Greater Middlesex Conference (general); Big Central Football Conference (football)
- Team name: Panthers
- Rival: Carteret High School
- Accreditation: Middle States Association of Colleges and Schools
- Newspaper: Pawprints
- Website: pahs.paps.net

Perth Amboy High School (or PAHS) is a four-year comprehensive community public high school which serves students in ninth through twelfth grades from Perth Amboy in Middlesex County, in the U.S. state of New Jersey, operating as the lone secondary school of the Perth Amboy Public Schools. The school has been accredited by the Middle States Association of Colleges and Schools Commission on Elementary and Secondary Schools since 1928.

As of the 2024–25 school year, the school had an enrollment of 2,769 students and 187.5 classroom teachers (on an FTE basis), for a student–teacher ratio of 14.8:1. There were 1,763 students (63.7% of enrollment) eligible for free lunch and 171 (6.2% of students) eligible for reduced-cost lunch. Based on 2021-22 data from the New Jersey Department of Education, it was the eighth-largest high school in the state and one of 29 schools with more than 2,000 students.

Perth Amboy High School opened a new 590,000 square feet (55,000 m^{2}) facility in September 2024 that was designed to handle 3,300 students and was constructed at a cost of $283 million by the New Jersey Schools Development Authority, which paid for all but the $3.3 million covered by the school district. The new building replaced a previous facility completed in 1971 that was operating in excess of capacity. The school building constructed in 1971 replaced an earlier building that opened in 1881. The 1971 building was originally built to accommodate 1,600 students, resulting in overcrowding with nearly 50% more students attending the school than the design capacity. Perth Amboy High School is the only public high school in the city other than the Perth Amboy campus of the Middlesex County Vocational and Technical High Schools. The school mascot is a panther.

== Awards, recognition, and rankings ==
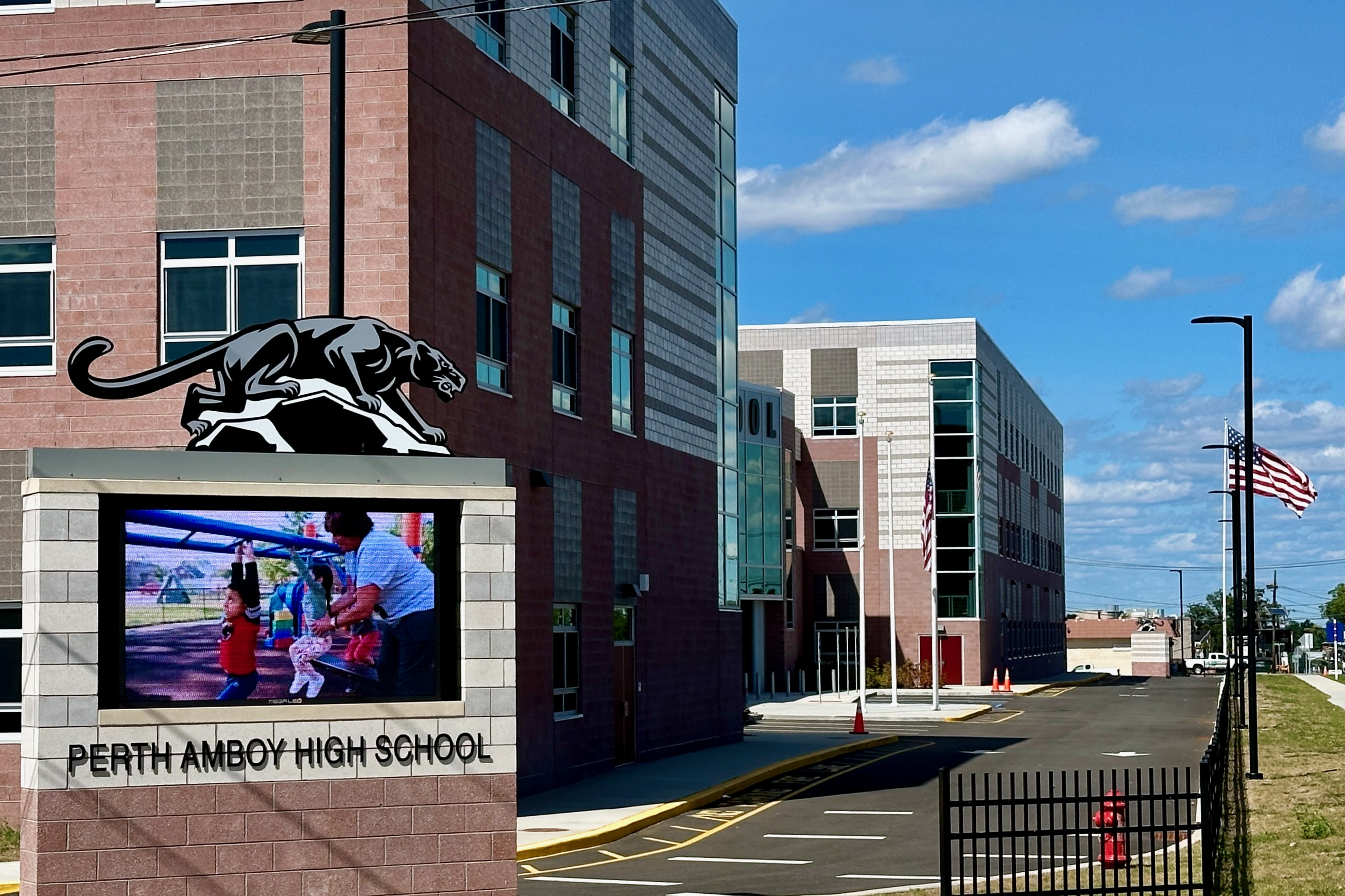
Perth Amboy High School sign with mascot

The school was the 322nd-ranked public high school in New Jersey out of 339 schools statewide in New Jersey Monthly magazine's September 2014 cover story on the state's "Top Public High Schools," using a new ranking methodology. The school had been ranked 320th in the state of 328 schools in 2012, after being ranked 318th in 2010 out of 322 schools listed. The magazine ranked the school 270th in 2008 out of 316 schools. The school was ranked 274th in the magazine's September 2006 issue, which surveyed 316 schools across the state.

== Demographics ==
PAHS is 91% Hispanic, 5.9% Black, 2.5% White, and 0.4% Asian. Most of the students belong to working class families. 68% of the students participate in the free or reduced price lunch program. 71% of the school speaks Spanish in their homes while another 1% speaks another language that isn't English at home, mainly Portuguese, Polish, Vietnamese, or Cantonese. There are also limited English proficient (LEP) students, who compose 15% of the school. Limited English Proficient students cannot speak, read, or write in English and are placed in "bilingual" classes.

The average class size is 24 students, with special education courses meeting state standards. The school's ratio of students to computers is 1:1; meanwhile, the state average is 4:1. The school day is longer than the state average. The instructional time is seven hours, whereas the state average is five hours and 52 minutes.

== Student performance ==
On the language arts section of the High School Proficiency Assessment (HSPA), 58% scored proficient and 39% scored partial. On the math section of the test, 45% scored proficient and 48% scored partial. The average SAT score is 849 out of 1600. However, these results are offset by the high number of bilingual students resulting in lower than average test scores in the school itself. The Advanced Placement Program (AP) participation is 11%. The average attendance rate is 90%. As of the 2004–05 school year, PAHS had a suspension rate of 44%. 91% of PAHS seniors graduated. 33% of the school graduated via the SRA process and 12% graduated through the Limited English Proficiency SRA process. Roughly 54% of the graduating seniors go on to two-year colleges, particularly Middlesex County College and another 29% of the graduating seniors go on to four-year colleges.

== Extracurricular activities ==
Extracurricular activities include many clubs such as Robotics, Guitar Club, and Anime Club. The high school also features School Based Youth Services Program. The School Based Youth Services Program is designed to concern the social issues and health needs of students, and is sponsored by the Jewish Renaissance Foundation and the Perth Amboy Board of Education.

There are also many school clubs which students can propose or start themselves, and run if they find an advisor. The school also has a Concert and Marching Band, which plays many parades throughout the year and during football season.

== Athletics ==
The Perth Amboy High School Panthers compete in the Greater Middlesex Conference, which is comprised of public and private high schools in the Middlesex County area and operates under the supervision of the New Jersey State Interscholastic Athletic Association (NJSIAA). With 1,720 students in grades 10–12, the school was classified by the NJSIAA for the 2019–20 school year as Group IV for most athletic competition purposes, which included schools with an enrollment of 1,060 to 5,049 students in that grade range. The football team competes in Division 5C of the Big Central Football Conference, which includes 60 public and private high schools in Hunterdon, Middlesex, Somerset, Union and Warren counties, which are broken down into 10 divisions by size and location. The school was classified by the NJSIAA as Group V South for football for 2024–2026, which included schools with 1,333 to 2,324 students.

Led by Brian Taylor, the 1968 boys basketball team won the Group IV state championship, defeating Neptune High School by a score of 72-70 in the tournament final at Atlantic City's Convention Hall.

Dating back to 1927, Perth Amboy has had a Thanksgiving Day football rivalry with Carteret High School that was listed at 8th on NJ.com's 2017 list "Ranking the 31 fiercest rivalries in N.J. HS football". Perth Amboy lead the rivalry with a 46-42-2 overall record as of 2017.

== Feeder patterns ==
All Perth Amboy Public Schools elementary and middle schools feed into PAHS.

== Administration ==
The school's principal is Charles Ezell.

== Notable alumni ==
Notable alumni of Perth Amboy High School include:

- Frank Buckiewicz (1930–2017, class of 1947), football player and coach who served as the head football coach at Pacific University from 1965 to 1980
- Alan Cheuse (1940–2015, class of 1957), writer and critic
- José DeLeón (1960–2024), professional baseball pitcher
- Wilda Diaz (born 1964), politician who served as Mayor of Perth Amboy from 2008 to 2020
- Cora Du Bois (1903–1991, class of 1921), cultural anthropologist
- Bernard J. Dwyer (1921-1998, class of 1938), politician, who served in the United States House of Representatives from New Jersey from 1981 to 1993
- Bill Flynn (born 1938), politician who served in the New Jersey General Assembly from 1974 to 1986
- Gene Hubka (1924–2017), American football tailback who played for the Pittsburgh Steelers
- Chad Kinch (1958–1994), professional basketball player
- Jack Kolbert (1927–2005), French teacher and educator in the humanities and social sciences
- Steve Mizerak (1944–2006, class of 1962), champion pool player
- Edward J. Patten (1905–1994), politician who served as mayor of Perth Amboy and represented the New Jersey's 15th congressional district in the United States House of Representatives
- Bony Ramirez (born 1996), self-taught painter and visual artist
- Arthur J. Sills (1917–1982, class of 1934), New Jersey Attorney General from 1962 to 1970
- Joann H. Smith (1934-1998, class of 1952), politician who served in the New Jersey General Assembly from the 13th Legislative District from 1986 to 1998
- Brian Taylor (born 1951, class of 1969), former NBA basketball player
- Bruce Taylor (born 1948), former cornerback who played for the San Francisco 49ers
- David T. Wilentz (1894–1988, class of 1912), New Jersey Attorney General from 1934 to 1944
- Robert Wilentz (1927–1996), longest-serving Chief Justice of the New Jersey Supreme Court, from 1979 to 1996
- Warren W. Wilentz (1924-2010), attorney and politician
