= James R. Zazzali =

American judge (born 1937)

James Zazzali

Chief Justice of the Supreme Court of New Jersey
- In office October 26, 2006 – June 17, 2007
- Appointed by: Christine Todd Whitman
- Preceded by: Daniel Joseph O'Hern
- Succeeded by: Stuart Rabner

Associate Justice of the Supreme Court of New Jersey
- In office May 25, 2000 – October 26, 2006

Attorney General of New Jersey
- In office March 26, 1981 – January 19, 1982
- Governor: Brendan Byrne
- Preceded by: John J. Degnan
- Succeeded by: Irwin I. Kimmelman

Personal details
- Born: June 17, 1937 (age 88) Newark, New Jersey, U.S.
- Spouse: Eileen Fitzsimmons
- Education: Georgetown University

James Ronald Zazzali (born June 17, 1937) is an American jurist who served as Chief Justice of the New Jersey Supreme Court from October 26, 2006, until his retirement on June 17, 2007. He previously served as an associate justice of the Supreme Court from June 14, 2000.

== Biography ==
Zazzali was born in Newark, New Jersey, on June 17, 1937, of Italian descent. He studied at Seton Hall Preparatory School, and later graduated with a B.S. from Georgetown College in 1958 and was awarded a J.D. from Georgetown University Law Center. After graduation, he was admitted into the bars of New Jersey, New York, and the District of Columbia.

Zazzali served as the chief of the Appeals Division in the Office of the Essex County Prosecutor. He also served as the general counsel to the New Jersey Sports and Exposition Authority and was a receiver for Bloomfield College. He went on to become the chairman of the New Jersey State Commission of Investigation, the vice-chairman of the Disciplinary Review Board, and served as New Jersey Attorney General from 1981 to 1982. He was also appointed as special master for county jails in Essex, Monmouth, and Bergen counties. He also served on delegations to certain United Nations conferences.

Zazzali was nominated by Governor Christine Todd Whitman for the position of justice to the NJ Supreme Court on May 18, 2000, and was confirmed on May 25, 2000. He was officially sworn into the position by then-Chief Justice Deborah T. Poritz. In September 2006, with Poritz nearing mandatory retirement age, Governor Jon Corzine nominated Zazzali for promotion to chief justice.

Zazzali was sworn in as Chief Justice on October 26, 2006. He left the court upon reaching the mandatory retirement age of 70 on June 17, 2007, and was replaced by then-Attorney General Stuart Rabner.

Zazzali is married to Eileen Fitzsimmons and has five children: Mara; James, Jr., Robert; Courtney; and Kevin. He has been a resident of Rumson, New Jersey.

Legal offices
Preceded by John J. Degnan	Attorney General of New Jersey; 1981 – 1982	Succeeded by Irwin I. Kimmelman
Preceded by Deborah T. Poritz	Chief Justice of the New Jersey Supreme Court; 2006 – 2007	Succeeded by Stuart Rabner
