= Christopher Porrino =

American politician (born 1967)

Chris Porrino
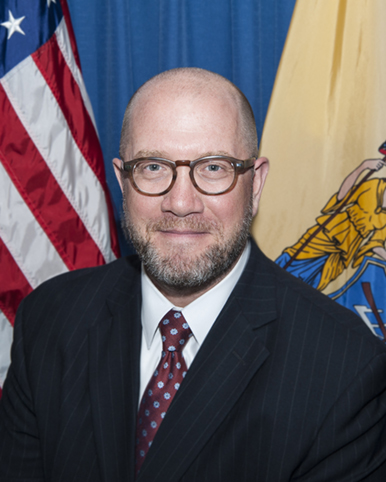

60th Attorney General of New Jersey
- In office June 21, 2016 – January 16, 2018; Acting: June 21, 2016 – August 1, 2016
- Governor: Chris Christie
- Preceded by: Jeffrey Chiesa
- Succeeded by: Gurbir Grewal

Personal details
- Born: 1966 or 1967 (age 59–60) Teaneck, New Jersey, U.S.
- Party: Independent
- Education: Lehigh University (BA); Seton Hall University (JD)

Christopher S. Porrino (born October 20, 1967) is an American trial lawyer who served as the Attorney General of New Jersey from 2016 to 2018. Porrino is currently a partner of Lowenstein Sandler, and chair of the firm's Litigation Department.

Porrino was born in Teaneck and raised in Fort Lee and Englewood Cliffs. He resides in Summit, New Jersey, with his wife, Christina, and their two children.

== Education ==
Porrino graduated from Lehigh University and received his J.D. degree from Seton Hall University School of Law. He is admitted to the bars of the State of New Jersey and the State of New York, and is admitted to practice in the United States District Court for the District of New Jersey, the United States District Court for the Southern District of New York, and the United States Court of Appeals for the Third Circuit.

== Law practice ==
Porrino began his legal career as a law clerk (1992-1993) for then-Magistrate Judge Freda L. Wolfson, U.S. District Judge for the District of New Jersey. He then worked as an associate attorney at Greenbaum, Rowe, Smith & Davis from 1993 to 2004. Porrino joined Lowenstein Sandler as a partner in 2004, and served as vice chair of the firm's litigation department, focusing his practice on criminal and civil trials.

In 2012, Porrino left private practice for public service. He held a variety of positions at the State of New Jersey, including Director of the Division of Law from 2012 to 2014, Chief Counsel to Chris Christie from 2014 to 2015, and as the state's Attorney General from 2016 to 2018.

After serving as the 60th Attorney General of New Jersey, Porrino returned to Lowenstein Sandler in 2018 as a partner and chair of the firm's litigation department. He is a crisis manager, having represented numerous private and public companies and individuals in alleged scandals, including Governor Christie during the "Bridgegate" scandal, and currently represents individuals and businesses of all sizes in civil, criminal, and regulatory matters involving securities, consumer fraud, banking, insurance, tax, antitrust, real estate, and the environment. He also regularly conducts internal investigations for clients faced with allegations of wrongdoing by insiders.

Approximately ten months after completing his term as Attorney General in a Republican administration, Porrino was hired by New Jersey Governor Phil Murphy (D) in October 2018 to represent his office in connection with an anticipated legislative inquiry of Murphy and his administration. The state legislative panel was to be tasked with looking into certain hiring practices and an alleged sexual assault that occurred during the governor's campaign. The announcement of Porrino's hiring by the Murphy administration was applauded by legislative leaders who were driving the inquiry ("Sweeney, Coughlin have no problems with Porrino," New Jersey Globe, October 22, 2018).

== Christie administration ==
Porrino served as Director of the Division of Law in the Attorney General's Office from February 2012 to January 2014, overseeing a team of 800 state employees, 500 of whom were lawyers.

Porrino argued the landmark Harvey Cedars “dunes” case, before the New Jersey Supreme Court. The decision in 2013 paved the way for the state's shore protection and the dune construction projects that followed.

From January 2014 through July 2015, Porrino served as Chief Counsel to the Christie administration. On his first day as Chief Counsel, the Fort Lee lane closure scandal, known as "Bridgegate", broke in the news media. As Chief Counsel, Porrino navigated the Governor's Office through that crisis and the myriad legal issues that followed. In that role, he also had broad responsibility overseeing appointments, legislative matters, and all state authorities.

Porrino worked closely with Governor Christie and members of the New Jersey Legislature to secure the passage of numerous pieces of critical legislation, including the Criminal Justice Reform Act (i.e., bail reform).

He was involved in the state's controversial ExxonMobil-New Jersey environmental contamination settlement.

== New Jersey Attorney General ==
In June 2016, Porrino was nominated by the Governor of New Jersey, Chris Christie to be the New Jersey Attorney General, and served as Acting Attorney General until unanimously confirmed by the Senate on August 1, 2016.

Under his leadership, the Attorney General's Office created and enacted what was then the strictest prescribing rules in the country aimed at curtailing the over-dispensing of highly addictive pain medication, and proposed regulations to prevent prescribing physicians from being influenced by gifts and other rewards from pharmaceutical companies. He targeted “pill mills” and professionals engaged in indiscriminate prescribing, resulting in more civil and criminal charges filed against medical professionals during his term than during any comparable period in the history of the department. He oversaw the expansion of the state's prescription monitoring program (PMP), including the implementation of mandatory PMP look-ups by prescribers and interconnectivity with PMPs from a number of other states.

Porrino oversaw the implementation of bail reform in New Jersey. Using a validated risk assessment tool, dangerous and high-risk defendants are now held in custody and can no longer “buy” their way out of jail pending trial.

Porrino targeted violent crime in New Jersey, including gun violence, taking almost 5,000 guns out of circulation over a single weekend. He also led a multi-department cooperative effort to address critical public safety issues in Trenton, New Jersey.

To help identify potential cases of corruption, Porrino's office launched an Anti-Corruption Whistleblower Program. Among other examples, the office indicted and convicted Mayor Jose “Joey” Torres of the City of Paterson and three city employees on corruption charges.

To combat elder abuse, Porrino's office became the country's first to loan hidden cameras to citizens who suspected that their elders were being abused. The “Safe Care Cam Program” gives participants the opportunity to covertly observe the care being given to their loved ones.

In 2016, on the child protection front, Porrino drafted legislation that strengthened child protection statutes and increased penalties for those engaged in child pornography in New Jersey. The department investigated and prosecuted persons who violated the child protection laws, including “Operation Statewide,” a statewide sweep that resulted in the arrest of forty men on charges of child pornography, and “Operation Safety Net” that resulted in the arrest of another seventy-nine men on child exploitation charges.

To combat distracted driving, Porrino spearheaded a campaign to encourage the public to report distracted driving violations through the state's #77 hotline in response to the burgeoning numbers of distracted drivers. The New Jersey State Police sent warning letters to those reported to inform motorists that their vehicles have been spotted being driven dangerously or by a distracted driver and warning them of the penalties if caught by the police.

In the civil rights area, the department prosecuted numerous acts of discrimination. In a case that received national attention, Porrino led a civil rights action against the Township of Mahwah wherein it was alleged that local officials engaged in a pattern of discrimination to exclude Orthodox Jews.

In the area of juvenile justice, he led the planned closure of a Civil War-era youth prison as part of other important reforms of the state's juvenile justice system.

In the area of community policing, Porrino and the department implemented the first statewide community policing grant program, named in honor of fallen police officer Matthew Tarentino. The department designed and mandated the first-ever statewide continuing education curriculum to train police on de-escalation, cultural awareness, and implicit bias.

== See also ==
- Governorship of Chris Christie
- List of people involved in the Fort Lee lane closure scandal

Legal offices
Preceded by Robert Lougy; Acting	Attorney General of New Jersey; 2016–2018	Succeeded by Gurbir Grewal
