= Arthur J. Sills =

American politician

Arthur J. Sills (October 19, 1917 – December 26, 1982) was the attorney general of New Jersey from 1962 to 1970. As New Jersey's top law enforcement official, Sills championed an expanded state police, civil rights and stronger laws on gun control.

== Early life and education ==
Sills was born in Brooklyn, New York in 1917, and his family moved to Perth Amboy, New Jersey in 1921. He contracted polio when he was four years old and later traveled to Warm Springs, Georgia for treatment. There he befriended Franklin D. Roosevelt, who was receiving treatment for his paralytic illness.

Sills graduated from Perth Amboy High School in 1934. He received a B.A. degree from Rutgers University in 1938 and a law degree at Harvard Law School in 1941. He joined the law firm of former Attorney General David T. Wilentz, former Attorney General of New Jersey, from 1941 to 1950. From 1950 to 1962, he was a partner in the Perth Amboy firm of Wilentz, Goldman, Spitzer & Sills.

== Attorney General ==
Sills was appointed by Governor Richard J. Hughes as Attorney General of New Jersey. He was confirmed by the New Jersey Senate and sworn in on January 16, 1962, the day of Hughes's inauguration. As Attorney General in the two Hughes administrations, Sills championed civil rights and strong gun control legislation.

=== Civil Rights controversies ===
Sills was criticized by civil rights groups for defending a warrantless search for stolen guns by 300 heavily armed New Jersey State Police and National Guardsmen during the 1967 Plainfield riots. The search was carried out without warrants under a declaration of emergency by Governor Hughes. The search was called off when residents protested that their homes were being damaged.

Sills also came under fire from the American Civil Liberties Union for writing a memorandum in the wake of the 1967 Newark riots encouraging state police to compile detailed dossiers on people taking part in demonstrations.

== Law firm ==
After leaving office, Sills founded his own firm based in Newark, New Jersey, Sills, Beck, Cummis, Radin, Tischman & Zuckerman (now known as Sills Cummis & Gross). He represented James Florio during the recount for the 1981 gubernatorial election. He also served as a member of the Board of Directors of New Jerey's Anti-Defamation League. In 1982 he died of a stroke at the age of 65.

Legal offices
| Preceded by David D. Furman | Attorney General of New Jersey; 1962 – 1970 | Succeeded by George F. Kugler, Jr. |
