= New Jersey Antitrust Act =

New Jersey competition law enacted in 1970

The New Jersey Antitrust Act is a 1970 law of the U.S. state of New Jersey. It prohibits agreements that unlawfully restrain trade, monopolization, and attempts to monopolize a market within the state. Its principal prohibitions are modeled on the federal Sherman Antitrust Act.

== History ==
In October 1969, the New Jersey State Commission of Investigation issued a report on organized crime in the state's garbage collection and disposal industry. The report identified industry trade associations that fixed prices and restricted competition.

In December 1969, Governor Richard J. Hughes called for a state antitrust law to help combat organized crime's involvement in business. The Legislature enacted the Antitrust Act in 1970 in response to the commission's recommendations. The law took effect on May 21, 1970.

== Provisions and enforcement ==
Courts must interpret the act consistently with rulings on comparable federal antitrust laws. The New Jersey Attorney General investigates suspected violations and brings enforcement proceedings.

The act provides for civil and criminal enforcement and allows private lawsuits. Available civil remedies include injunctions, treble damages, and attorneys' fees. A 2022 amendment allowed indirect purchasers, who buy through intermediaries, to seek damages for antitrust violations.
