= Walter D. Van Riper =

Republican Party politician

Attorney General of New Jersey
- In office February 4, 1944 – February 4, 1948
- Governor: Walter Evans Edge
- Preceded by: David T. Wilentz
- Succeeded by: Theodore D. Parsons

Personal details
- Born: May 18, 1895 Montville, New Jersey, U.S.
- Died: March 4, 1973 (aged 77) Boca Raton, Florida, U.S.
- Party: Republican
- Education: New Jersey Law School (LLB)

Walter David Van Riper (May 18, 1895 – March 4, 1973) was an American politician and judge. A member of the Republican Party, he served as mayor of West Orange, New Jersey, and was a county court judge for 18 years before being chosen to serve as the Attorney General of New Jersey from 1944 to 1948, focusing on combating racketeering while in office.

== Early life and education ==
Van Riper was born in Montville, New Jersey, and graduated from Boonton High School in 1912. He attended the New Jersey Law School (since merged into Rutgers Law School) and was admitted to the state bar in 1916. He was mayor of West Orange, New Jersey, in 1920 and served as an Assistant United States Attorney for the United States District Court for the District of New Jersey from 1922 to 1924.

== New Jersey Attorney General ==
Having served for 18 years as a judge in the Essex County Court of Common Pleas, he was nominated by Governor of New Jersey Walter Evans Edge to succeed David T. Wilentz. Van Riper took office as New Jersey Attorney General in 1944 and served through 1948.

As part of an effort to target Frank Hague, boss of the Hudson County Democratic machine, Van Riper was appointed to take over the county prosecutor's office. Using outside investigators and 55 state troopers, Van Riper conducted a series of raids in August 1944 on Hudson County horse-race betting wire rooms that had been protected by Hague and was able to obtain indictments against more than 50 people who had been involved in the illegal activities, the first such indictments in Hague's 27 years controlling the county. In retaliation, Hague had charges of check kiting and black-market gasoline sales filed against Van Riper in federal court through a United States Attorney controlled by Hague. Van Riper went to trial on both indictments and was acquitted of all charges.

== Death ==
A resident of West Orange, Van Riper died of a heart attack he experienced while swimming in the pool at the Boca Raton Hotel and Country Club in Boca Raton, Florida, on March 4, 1973, at the age of 77.

Legal offices
Preceded by David T. Wilentz	Attorney General of New Jersey; 1944 – 1948	Succeeded by Theodore D. Parsons
