= John Jay Hoffman =

American judge (born 1965)

John Hoffman

Justice of the Supreme Court of New Jersey
- Incumbent
- Assumed office October 2, 2024
- Appointed by: Phil Murphy
- Preceded by: Lee Solomon

Attorney General of New Jersey
- Acting
- In office June 10, 2013 – March 14, 2016
- Governor: Chris Christie
- Preceded by: Jeffrey Chiesa
- Succeeded by: Robert Lougy (acting)

Personal details
- Born: August 23, 1965 (age 60)
- Party: Independent
- Spouse: Mary Jude Cox (m. 2003)
- Education: Colgate University (BA); Duke University (JD)

John Hoffman (born August 23, 1965) is an American lawyer who has served as a justice of the Supreme Court of New Jersey since 2024. He previously served as the acting attorney general of New Jersey from 2013 to 2016. He served from 2013 to 2016, longer than any other acting attorney general in the state's history.

== Background ==
Hoffman was born August 23, 1965, to Judith and John A. Hoffman. Raised in Edison, New Jersey, Hoffman graduated from J. P. Stevens High School in 1983 He graduated from Colgate University before earning his Juris Doctor degree at Duke University. Hoffman married Mary Jude Cox December 6, 2003. Their fathers, Stuart T. Cox and John A. Hoffman, worked together as partners of the law firm Wilentz, Goldman & Spitzer in Woodbridge Township, New Jersey.

His wife is an ophthalmologist and a glaucoma specialist.

He has been a resident of the Marlton section of Evesham Township, New Jersey.

== Tenure as acting attorney general ==
He ascended to the position when Attorney General Jeffrey Chiesa resigned on June 6, 2013, after Governor Chris Christie announced that he would appoint Chiesa to succeed recently deceased United States Senator Frank Lautenberg.

Hoffman resigned as acting attorney general in March 2016 and became the general counsel of Rutgers University.

== Background ==
Hoffman was a trial attorney in the United States Department of Justice Civil Division, where he worked on a number of the Winstar-related cases (United States v. Winstar Corp.#Winstar-Related Cases).

== New Jersey Supreme Court ==
On June 10, 2024, Hoffman was nominated as an associate justice to the New Jersey Supreme Court by Governor Phil Murphy, to succeed Lee Solomon upon Solomon's mandatory retirement from the court.

After his nomination was announced, he gained support from Senators Brian P. Stack, Jon Bramnick (R), Vin Gopal, Joseph Lagana, and Bob Smith. He also has the support of Senators Nicholas Scutari, John Burzichelli, Patrick Diegnan, Gordon M. Johnson, Raj Mukherji, Declan O'Scanlon (R), Vincent J. Polistina (R), and Doug Steinhardt (R). As of June 2024, after winning the additional support of Senators Paul Sarlo and Linda Greenstein, Hoffman has enough support to advance through the Senate Judiciary Committee. However, under the New Jersey Senate's unwritten rule of senatorial courtesy, Hoffman also needs the support of his home county (Burlington County) senators Troy Singleton (D) (also a member of the Senate Judiciary Committee) and Latham Tiver (R). On August 14, 2024, the New Jersey Globe confirmed that Tiver will vote in support of Hoffman. On September 26, 2024, Hoffman was unanimously approved by the Senate Judiciary Committee. On September 30, 2024, Hoffman was unanimously confirmed by the New Jersey Senate. He was sworn in on October 2, 2024.

Legal offices
Preceded by Jeffrey Chiesa	Attorney General of New Jersey; Acting; 2013–2016	Succeeded by Robert Lougy; Acting
Preceded by Lee Solomon	Justice of the Supreme Court of New Jersey; 2024–present	Incumbent
