= Theodore D. Parsons =

American politician

Theodore D. Parsons (May 24, 1894 – October 20, 1978) was an American lawyer who served as New Jersey Attorney General from 1949 to 1954.

== Biography ==
Parsons was born on May 24, 1894, in La Crosse, Wisconsin. After moving to New Jersey, he graduated from Red Bank High School and attended Princeton University Class of 1915. During World War I he served as a test and delivery pilot with the United States Army Air Service in France. After graduating from Columbia Law School, he passed the bar in 1919 and began practicing law. He was named by Governor Alfred E. Driscoll to serve as New Jersey Attorney General, and took office on February 4, 1948, serving in that role until 1954. He died in 1978 at the age of 84.

Legal offices
| Preceded by Walter D. Van Riper | Attorney General of New Jersey; 1949 – 1954 | Succeeded by Grover C. Richman, Jr. |
