= Essex County Prosecutor's Office =

County prosecutor's office in the State of New Jersey

Coordinates: 40.738030°N 74.181358°W

The Essex County Prosecutor's Office (ECPO) is the largest and busiest county prosecutor's office in the State of New Jersey. It consists of approximately 140 assistant prosecutors (attorneys at law), 160 detectives licensed to carry arms, and 125 support staff. It is headquartered at the Essex County Government Complex.

ECPO presently processes between 16,000 and 20,000 adult defendants charged with criminal acts per year. In addition, between 3,500 and 5,000 juveniles are processed each year through delinquency proceedings. Most of these defendants are arrested and charged by local or county-level law enforcement agencies, but ECPO also originates charges against defendants through its own investigatory units, and via direct indictment by the Essex County Grand Jury (i.e., charges issued directly by the grand jury and not prior to grand jury review). Between 5,000 and 6,000 adult defendants are indicted in Essex County each year. Essex County currently accounts for about 18% of all criminal (felony) cases referred to county prosecutors' offices in New Jersey. Approximately 35% of the state's homicides and 14% of sexual assaults occur in Essex.

== The Essex County Prosecutor ==
The position of Essex County Prosecutor was established by the Constitution of the State of New Jersey. The Prosecutor serves as the Chief Law Enforcement Officer in the county. County Prosecutors in New Jersey are appointed by the Governor for a term of five years, and must be affirmed by the State Senate. They are not elected to office, as with equivalent positions (e.g., District Attorney or State's Attorney) in other states. County Prosecutors in New Jersey may be reappointed without term limit. The daily operations of the Office of the Essex County Prosecutor are funded mostly through tax revenues collected by Essex County and budgeted by the Board of Chosen Freeholders, with additional sums garnered from crime forfeitures and from grants made by State and federal agencies.

== History ==
In 1776, the State of New Jersey ratified its first Constitution (superseded by later Constitutions in 1844 and 1947). Under this Constitution, the elected Governor appointed an Attorney General to enforce the laws of the State. The Attorney General in turn appointed deputies for the various counties, including Essex, to enforce the criminal laws on behalf of the local populace. In 1822, the New Jersey General Assembly passed an act authorizing a more independent Prosecutor of Pleas for each county, to be appointed by the Court of Quarter Sessions once every five years. A few years later, the Governor was given the authority to appoint each county's Prosecutor of Pleas.

On February 20, 1829, Amzi Dodd became the first governor-appointed Prosecutor of Pleas for Essex County. The earliest record of a prosecution by Prosecutor Dodd involves “a nuisance in suffering the water to stagnate and become offensive in the old burying ground” in Newark.

The first Prosecutor of Pleas worked alone, but by 1877 the Prosecutor required the help of a First Assistant. As Essex County grew and matters became more complex, the Office of the Prosecutor grew in size. By 1922, Essex County Prosecutor John O. Bigelow employed 28 men, including three Assistant Prosecutors, two Detective Captains, two Lieutenants, and various detectives and clerks. In the 1920s and 30's, cases involving gambling, organized crime and official corruption were growing in number. In October 1935, the nationally known organized crime figure Dutch Schultz was shot at the Palace Chop House in Newark. Although the prime suspect was found hanged soon after the incident, the Office continued its investigation and identified Schultz's real shooter who pleaded guilty to the murder in 1940.

By 1945, the Office still had only three Assistant Prosecutors, despite a growing number of murder and gambling cases. In 1951, Prosecutor Edward Gaulkin gained attention by successfully prosecuting four men charged with conspiracy, extortion and bribery in the Newark milk scandal case. In 1959, New Jersey Governor Robert B. Meyner nominated Brendan T. Byrne of West Orange as the 25th Prosecutor of Essex County. Prosecutor (and later Governor) Byrne served the Office until 1967. By 1962, there were 16 Assistant Prosecutors, most of whom were part-time employees. Shortly thereafter, the first female Assistant Prosecutor was appointed. Also during Byrne's tenure, the “Charlie Squad” was formed, a name coined after members of the public were urged to report illegal gambling by calling a dedicated phone number.

Shortly after Prosecutor Byrne left the Office in 1967, the City of Newark experienced a violent week-long civil disturbance, which heralded long-term social and economic change in Essex County. These transformations challenged future Prosecutors to respond to changing patterns of crime, including increased violent crime rates and increased narcotics-related crime. By 1973, the legal staff numbered 63 lawyers, all full-time. County Investigators were increasingly selected from the ranks of experienced local police officers. Under Prosecutor George Schneider (Prosecutor from 1981 to 1986), the number of Assistant Prosecutors exceeded 100. Increasing resources were also dedicated to special squads. The Homicide Squad was expanded and a Narcotics Section, which at first was a joint task force with the Sheriff's Office, was created. Eventually specialized units were established in Child Abuse, Sex Assault, Arson, Domestic Violence, Megan's Law, Gangs, and Economic Crime and Corruption.

In 1986, Governor Thomas Kean appointed the first African-American Prosecutor in Essex County (and only the second in the State of New Jersey), Herbert H. Tate, Jr. Computerization of the Office was begun and continued in stages throughout the terms of Prosecutor Tate and his successor, Prosecutor Clifford J. Minor. Also during this time, ECPO also established a Victim Witness Advocacy Office to help crime victims and witnesses cope with the disruption that crime and participation in the criminal justice system can bring.

In January, 1998, the first female Prosecutor, Patricia Hurt, was appointed by Governor Christie Todd Whitman. Prosecutor Hurt's tenure was affected by allegations of managerial and fiscal irregularities, and in July 1999, Governor Whitman dismissed Hurt and appointed Acting Prosecutor Donald Campolo from the State Division of Criminal Justice. A variety of other personnel from the State Attorney General's Office helped Campolo oversee ECPO operations for several years. However, in 2003, N.J. Governor James McGreevey appointed Paula T. Dow as Acting Prosecutor and effectively ended State oversight of the Office's daily functioning. In June, 2005, Governor Richard Codey swore in Dow to the office of Essex County Prosecutor.

== Recent developments ==
Since the year 2000, the Essex County Prosecutor's Office has responded to increased auto theft, narcotics and youth gang activity through the formation of special task forces in conjunction with federal, state and multi-state law enforcement agencies. During this time, ECPO also completed a second generation of computerization complete with e-mail and Internet access and increased its outreach to the public through its newly established Community Justice Program and its public web site. ECPO also established a fatal vehicle collision investigation unit, and a program to assure humane treatment and accurate evidence collection from the victims of sexual assault.

To respond to increased incidence of witness harassment by street gangs since 2002, ECPO has stepped up its witness protection efforts, and has opened a modern 15,000-square-foot (1,400 m^{2}) crime scene office to replace a small, outdated facility. The new facility features a forensic processing room, digital photo processing room and a drying chamber designed to process and package blood-soaked evidence. Its computer system is linked to the N.J. Automated Fingerprint Identification System (AFIS) to identify and match fingerprint evidence. Computer software allows detectives to visually reconstruct crime scenes. In addition to investigating homicides, shootings and sex crimes, the ECPO Crime Scene Unit is able to assist county police departments in burglaries and other criminal investigations.

Also during Prosecutor Dow's tenure, the process of handling most criminal cases after arrest and bail-setting was revised from a "horizontal" structure involving separate departments handling initial evaluation ("screening"), grand jury presentation, and trial or plea negotiation, to a "vertical" structure where one team of assistant prosecutors and support staff handles a case from start to finish. By early 2008, the "vertical trial units" handled most cases, although some cases continue to be handled partly or entirely by the special investigatory units dedicated to arson, sexual assault, domestic violence, narcotics, economic corruption and gang-related cases.

== High Profile Cases ==
The Essex County Prosecutor's Office has been involved in a variety of high-profile cases that gained national attention over the past twenty five years. In 1985, Kelly Michaels, a child care worker at the Wee Care Nursery School in Maplewood, NJ was arrested on allegations of sexually abusing children. The Essex County Prosecutor's Office helped to investigate the case and brought forth an indictment against Ms. Michaels, setting the stage for a trial. In 1988, the trial jury found Ms. Michaels guilty. However, the Appellate Division of the N.J. Superior Court overturned this verdict citing to a variety of improper prosecutorial practices, and required a new trial. After the N.J. Supreme Court affirmed this decision in 1994, ECPO dropped the indictment against Ms. Michaels.

In 1989, a sexual assault case was brought by ECPO against four high school athletes from Glen Ridge, NJ, who were convicted in 1993 for victimizing a 17-year-old developmentally disabled woman. Three were convicted of aggravated sexual assault, and the fourth was convicted on one count of conspiracy. This case was the subject of a popular book, a TV movie, and an episode on the TV show “Law & Order.”

In April, 1999, during Prosecutor Hurt's tenure, the ECPO participated in the investigation of the shooting death of Orange, NJ Police Officer Joyce Carnegie. Both ECPO and the local police were criticized for the arrest of two suspects, the first alleged to have been held wrongly because of the failure to interview a key alibi witness, and to have been physically mistreated while in custody. A second suspect, Earl Faison, died while in the custody of local police. Five Orange Police Officers were later indicted by a federal grand jury and convicted for violating Faison's civil rights. Another suspect, Condell Woodson, pleaded guilty to Carnegie's murder and was sentenced to life in prison in June, 1999.

In January, 2000, a fire occurred in the Boland Hall dormitory of Seton Hall University in South Orange, NJ that caused the deaths of three students and the injuries of 58 students. Two University students were charged with murder and a variety of other counts after being indicted by the Essex County Grand Jury in 2003. In 2007, after years of detailed investigation, Joseph LePore and Sean Ryan were sentenced to five years in prison under a plea agreement. Some local commentators criticized Prosecutor Dow regarding her Office's handling of the case, citing delays and the fact that murder charges had been dropped. However, there were no direct witnesses, and all evidence in this case was forensic, circumstantial or hearsay in nature.

In January, 2003, two starving children were discovered in the basement of a shared home by a man who was living there with a woman named Sherry Murphy. The mummified remains of a 7-year-old child (Faheem Williams) were later also found in the basement. Murphy was a cousin of the dead child's mother. In September, 2005, Ms. Murphy pleaded guilty to charges of aggravated assault, criminal restraint and endangering the welfare of a child. Ms. Murphy's son Wesley also pleaded guilty to a reckless endangerment charge for a "wrestling" incident during which Faheem Williams had died about four months before being found.
