= Robert Lougy =

American politician

Attorney General of New Jersey
- Acting
- In office March 14, 2016 – June 21, 2016
- Governor: Chris Christie
- Preceded by: John Hoffman (Acting)
- Succeeded by: Christopher Porrino

Personal details
- Education: Pennsylvania State University (BA); Columbia University (JD)

Robert Lougy is a judge on the New Jersey Superior Court and the former acting New Jersey Attorney General.

== Early life and legal career ==
Lougy graduated from Pennsylvania State University in 1994 and from Columbia Law School in 2002.

== New Jersey Attorney General ==
A resident of Cranbury, New Jersey, Lougy was appointed by Governor Chris Christie on February 29, 2016 to serve as the state's Attorney General following the resignation of John Jay Hoffman, who left to become General Counsel of Rutgers University. Christie hailed Lougy for his deep public service experience, which spanned across both Democrat and Republican administrations. Despite criticisms that Governor Christie had assembled one third of his cabinet without the required Senate confirmation, politicians and special interests from both sides of the aisle commended his appointment. Beginning his position on March 15, 2016, Lougy oversaw more than 7,000 employees and served as the state's top law enforcement official.

== New Jersey Judiciary ==
Christie appointed Lougy to serve as a Superior Court Judge on May 20, 2016, after only two months as acting Attorney General. Lougy resigned from his position as Attorney General on March 14, 2016. He was approved by the Senate on June 23, 2016, and assigned to the Family Division of Mercer County. On June 8, 2021, Lougy was elevated by New Jersey Chief Justice Stuart Rabner to be Assignment Judge of Mercer, taking effect September 1, 2021.

Legal offices
| Preceded by John Hoffman; Acting | Attorney General of New Jersey; Acting; 2016 | Succeeded by Christopher Porrino |
