= United States v. Winstar Corp. =

- Supreme Court of the United States

Argued April 24, 1996 Decided July 1, 1996
- Full case name: United States v. Winstar Corp., et al.
- Citations: 518 U.S. 839 (more) 116 S.Ct. 2432; 135 L. Ed. 2d 964; 1996 U.S. LEXIS 4266

Case history
- Prior: Winstar Corp. v. United States, 25 Cl. Ct. 541 (1992); reversed, 994 F.2d 797 (Fed. Cir. 1993); on rehearing en banc, 64 F.3d 1531 (Fed. Cir. 1995); cert. granted, 516 U.S. 1087 (1996).

Holding
- Claim against government for breach of contract upheld.

Court membership
- Chief Justice William Rehnquist Associate Justices John P. Stevens · Sandra Day O'Connor; Antonin Scalia · Anthony Kennedy; David Souter · Clarence Thomas; Ruth Bader Ginsburg · Stephen Breyer

Case opinions
- Plurality: Souter, joined by Stevens, O'Connor, Breyer
- Concurrence: Breyer
- Concurrence: Scalia, joined by Kennedy, Thomas
- Dissent: Rehnquist, joined by Ginsburg (Parts I, III, IV)

United States v. Winstar Corp., 518 U.S. 839 (1996), was a decision by the United States Supreme Court which held that the United States Government had breached its contractual obligations. The court in Winstar rejected the Government's "unmistakability defense"—that surrenders of sovereign authority, such as the promise to refrain from regulatory changes, must appear in unmistakable terms in a contract in order to be enforceable.

Winstar arose as a consequence of the savings and loan crisis. Federal regulators had allowed "supervisory goodwill" to be counted as regulatory capital for financial institutions that took over failing thrifts. Congress later passed the Financial Institutions Reform, Recovery, and Enforcement Act of 1989, which substantially changed these advantages and one of the successor banks successfully sued. The United States Court of Appeals for the Federal Circuit found a breach of contract and awarded damages—the Supreme Court upheld the lower court decision. "Winstar" cases resulted in multimillion-dollar payouts to plaintiffs. As of July 31, 2000, there were 13 settlements or judgments totaling $1.158 billion against the federal government, with more than 100 more cases pending, as a result of the Winstar decision.

Winstar Corporation and its subsidiary United Federal Savings Bank was successfully represented by Charles J. Cooper. The board of United Federal Savings Bank consisted of chairman E. Ted Yoch, and directors Kenneth Bureau, Howard Rekstad, Gary Nordness, and William Bartolic. The decision makes clear that the Stipulation and Consent to Issuance of Order of Prohibition against United's board was improperly required by the Government.

== Winstar-Related Cases ==
The Winstar-related cases are 122 cases originating in the United States Court of Federal Claims and involving 400 financial institutions claiming a total of $30 billion in contract breach damages resulting from the enactment of the Financial Institutions Reform, Recovery, and Enforcement Act of 1989(FIRREA). The cases are named after the Supreme Court's decision in United States v. Winstar Corp., which rejected certain defenses raised by the United States and set the stage for the massive litigation that followed.

== History ==
In the 1980s, the Savings and loan crisis saw the industry collapsed under the weight of rising interest rates and deregulation. In response, regulators encouraged some banks and thrifts to acquire others; to support this, regulators allowed the resulting institution to meet lower capital guidelines. These reduced capital requirements were known as "forbearances" or "Supervisory goodwill. More than 122 separate cases were eventually filed in the Court of Federal Claims seeking compensation on behalf of thrifts and their owners and investors, claiming that FIRREA breached contracts the institutions had with the United States regarding the reduced capital standards. Specifically, regulators disallowed over 300 thrifts from including supervisory goodwill and capital credits as regulatory capital. The first set of cases to move forward from this group included the cases titled Winstar v. United States; eventually this went to the Supreme Court of the United States. In 1996, in United States v. Winstar Corp., a plurality of the Supreme Court rejected two of the Government's defenses, which paved the way for the remaining Winstar-related cases to move forward. These cases were very individualized, large contract-based claims; their only evident commonality was that their contracts with the government were allegedly breached by the passage of FIRREA. The last Winstar-related case was resolved in December 2015.

The Winstar cases were brought against the United States and defended by the Department of Justice. The Department of Justice's Civil Division's FY2011 Performance Budget Congressional Submission explained "The bailout of the savings and loan industry in the 1980s resulted in extensive defensive litigation that continues to this day. The Winstar litigation consisted of 122 cases involving 400 financial institutions claiming a total of $30 billion in contract breach damages resulting from the enactment of the Financial Institutions Reform, Recovery and Enforcement Act of 1989." The Civil Division's Deputy Assistant Attorney General, Stuart Schiffer, stated "This is the largest family of cases we've ever had, and I've never seen dollars like this at stake." The Department of Justice assembled a large team to litigate the cases for nearly two decades; leadership for these cases included David M. Cohen, Jeanne E. Davidson, William F. Ryan, and Kenneth M. Dintzer; team members included Scott D. Austin, Ashley N. Bailey, Delfa Castillo, Glenn Chernigoff, Colleen Conry, Gary Dernelle, Michael M. Duclos, Richard B. Evans, Henry R. Felix, Gregory R. Firehock, Tom Forgue, Elizabeth Frank, Paul G. Freeborne, Arlene P. Groner, Craig Gottlieb, Linda Halpern, Elizabeth A. Holt, John Jay Hoffman, Elizabeth M. Hosford, F. Jefferson Hughes, Joanne Johnson, John N. Kane, Jr., William G. Kanellis, Teresa A. Kolb, Kenneth M. Kulak, Luke P. Levasseur, David A. Levitt, Matthew D. Lee, Brian A. Mizoguchi, Elizabeth W. Newsom, Brian L. Owsley, Jane M.E. Peterson, Vincent D. Phillips, Scott Pivnick, John H. Roberson, John J. Todor, Delisa Sanchez, Jacob A. Schunk, Tarek Sawi, Ho Sik Shin, Lee M. Straus, Edward P. Sullivan, Tonia J. Tornatore, James R. Whitman, Tonya J. Williams, and Sameer P. Yerawadekar.

The FDIC had two roles in the Winstar-related cases. As the agency that enforced capital requirements against banks, the FDIC was a defendant agency in some cases. Also, as the receiver for failed thrifts, the agency sought to appear as a plaintiff and intervener on behalf of the failed thrifts. For example, in Landmark v. FDIC, the United States Court of Appeals for the Federal Circuit explained "The FDIC, as successor in interest to the defunct Dixie, intervened in this case in order to assert Dixie's claims in the amounts of $641.9 million for its 1986 contributions to St. Bernard, and $32.3 million for the unamortized portion of Dixie's goodwill that had been created by the 1982 Assistance Agreement and then eliminated by FIRREA. . . . Even if the FDIC were to have won a judgment for the entire amount it was seeking, however, none of the money paid by the government in satisfaction of such a judgment would leave the government. That is because the government holds a claim against Dixie for an even greater amount paid by the RTC to Dixie's depositors upon Dixie's liquidation. Nor would adjudication of the FDIC's claims affect Dixie's other creditors. For these reasons, the FDIC's claims do not give rise to an actual case or controversy because the FDIC and the government are not truly adverse as to the FDIC's claims. Therefore, the FDIC lacks standing, and its claims must be dismissed."

List of Winstar-related cases that went to judgment. [incomplete]

Institution	case	outcome
Glendale Federal Bank	Glendale Federal Bank, FSB v. United States	$381 million
California Federal Bank FSB	California Federal Bank, F.S.B. v. United States Six week Trial	$23 million
Landmark Land Company	Landmark Land Company v. FDIC	$21.5 million
El Paso Holding Co.	Hughes v. United States	$0
First Nationwide Financial Corp	Granite Management Corp v. United States	$0
Washington Mutual	Anchor Savings Bank, FSB v. United States of America	$356 million
First Federal Lincoln Bank	First Federal Lincoln v. United States	$0
First Federal Savings Loan Association of Annapolis	First Annapolis Bancorp, Inc. v. U.S.	$0
Sentry Mortgage Corporation	Glass v. United States	0$
Hansen Bancorp	Hansen Bancorp Inc. v. United States	0$
Southwest Savings Association	Caroline Hunt Trust Estate	$12.5 million
