= David D. Furman =

American judge

David D. Furman (November 22, 1917 – February 14, 2008) was an American lawyer and judge who served as New Jersey Attorney General and New Jersey Superior Court judge.

== Biography ==
Furman was born in 1917 in New York City. He was raised in South Orange, New Jersey and attended Phillips Exeter Academy, graduating in 1935. He received his A.B. degree from Harvard College in 1939. From 1939 to 1948, he worked as an electric furnace helper and metallurgist for the Duraloy Company and Carnegie-Illinois Steel Corporation in Pennsylvania.

He attended New York University School of Law, where he was editor-in-chief of the NYU Law Review. After graduating in 1950, he served as a law clerk to Judge Nathan L. Jacobs and then as a clerk on the New Jersey Superior Court, Appellate Division. From 1951 to 1954, he was an associate with the Newark law firm Stryker, Tams & Horner.

In January 1954, Furman was named Assistant Counsel in the Governor's Office. He was selected to head the Appellate Litigation section in the Division of Law in April 1955 and became chief of the Division in May 1956. In May 1958, Governor Robert B. Meyner nominated him to be New Jersey Attorney General. The New Jersey Senate confirmed the nomination on June 2, 1958. He served until January 1962.

In 1962 Furman was appointed Superior Court judge, first assigned to Hudson County and then to Middlesex County. He served in the Law Division from 1962 to 1965, the Chancery Division from 1965 to 1980, and the Appellate Division from 1980 to 1988. He was presiding judge of the Appellate Division on his retirement.

After retiring from the bench, he served as counsel to the firm of Purcell, Ries, Shannon, Mulcahy & O'Neill in Bedminster. He was also an adjunct professor of law at Seton Hall School of Law, where he taught courses on zoning, planning, and land use law. His Casebook on Zoning, Planning & Land Use Law in New Jersey was first published in 1996 and remains in publication through Gann Law Books.

In 2008 he died at the age of 90 at his residence in Far Hills, New Jersey.

Legal offices
Preceded by Grover C. Richman, Jr.	Attorney General of New Jersey; 1958–1962	Succeeded by Arthur J. Sills
