= Charles J. Cooper =

American lawyer (born 1952)

Chuck Cooper

United States Assistant Attorney General for the Office of Legal Counsel
- In office 1985–1988
- President: Ronald Reagan
- Deputy: Samuel Alito
- Preceded by: Theodore Olson
- Succeeded by: Douglas Kmiec

Personal details
- Born: March 8, 1952 (age 74) Dayton, Ohio, U.S.
- Party: Republican
- Education: University of Alabama (BA, JD)

Charles J. "Chuck" Cooper (born March 8, 1952, in Dayton, Ohio) is an appellate attorney and litigator in Washington, D.C., where he is a founding member and chairman of the law firm Cooper & Kirk, PLLC. He was named by The National Law Journal as one of the 10 best civil litigators in Washington. The New York Times described him as "one of Washington’s best-known lawyers." He has represented prominent American political figures, including Attorney General Jeff Sessions, in response to the alleged Russian interference in the 2016 United States elections; Attorney General John Ashcroft; and former National Security Adviser and United States Ambassador to the United Nations John Bolton.

Cooper has more than 40 years of legal experience in government and private practice, with numerous cases in trial and appellate court. He has argued several cases before the United States Supreme Court and been described as "one of the most prominent and aggressive Supreme Court litigators in the country."

== Biography ==
Cooper was born on March 8, 1952, in Dayton, Ohio, and was raised in Alabama. He attended local schools and received his Bachelor of Arts in business in 1974 from the University of Alabama. He earned his J.D. degree in 1977 from the University of Alabama Law School. He was editor-in-chief of the Alabama Law Review and ranked first in his class. He passed the bar in Alabama and Washington, D.C. He had two clerkships with judges. From 1977 to 1978, he clerked for Judge Paul Roney of the United States Court of Appeals for the Fifth Circuit, and from 1978 to 1979, he clerked for Justice William H. Rehnquist of the United States Supreme Court.

A member of the Republican Party, he started working in 1981 in the Civil Rights Division of the U.S. Department of Justice in Washington, D.C. In 1985, during the Reagan administration, he was appointed as an Assistant Attorney General in the Office of Legal Counsel, United States Department of Justice, the office responsible for providing legal opinions and informal advice to the White House, the Attorney General, and Executive Branch Departments and Agencies on issues of statutory, regulatory, constitutional and international law.

At a lunch at the Old Ebbitt Grill with Attorney General Ed Meese and other administration officials, he saw documents showing the administration's role in the Iran–Contra affair of 1986. He was Meese's chief aid in the so-called weekend investigation that discovered Lt. Col. Oliver North's plan to divest funds from the CIA's covert sale of missiles to Iran to the Nicaraguan Contras.

After his government service, in 1988 he entered private practice in the office of McGuireWoods. In 1990 he became a partner at Shaw Pittman (now Pillsbury Winthrop Shaw Pittman), where he headed the firm's Constitutional and Government Litigation Group. He worked there until co-founding Cooper & Carvin, now Cooper & Kirk, in 1996. His practice focuses on constitutional, commercial, and civil rights litigation.

Cooper led the legal team for the defendant-intervenors in Hollingsworth v. Perry, defending California Proposition 8 in 2008, which banned same-sex marriage in the state. He argued the case before the US Supreme Court. He has testified before Congress or Congressional committees on more than a dozen occasions.

He received the Republican National Lawyers Association's "Edwin Meese III Award" in 2016, and the group's "Republican Lawyer of the Year Award" in 2010.

Cooper was touted as a possible Solicitor General nominee in 2017. During this process, legal blogger David Lat explained his reasons for supporting Cooper. He described Cooper as “thoroughly devoted to drawing principled constitutional lines,” “an immovable rock” for upholding the rule of law, and “one of the most principled lawyers you’ll ever encounter.”

== Cooper & Kirk ==
Cooper & Kirk was described by The National Law Journal in 2021 as "one of the most influential firms in Washington", and "a player in many of the major events in American history over the past quarter-century". The firm's clients have included two former U.S. attorneys general, five U.S. senators, and a former national security adviser to the President.

Alumni of the firm Cooper founded include U.S. senators such as Ted Cruz and Tom Cotton; federal judges such as James Ho, Victor J. Wolski, and Howard C. Nielson Jr.; and solicitor general Noel Francisco. In 2022, legal commentator David Lat wrote that Cooper & Kirk may have the "most impressive and influential alumni" of any law firm, especially adjusting for size.

== Supreme Court arguments ==
Cooper has argued nine cases in front on the United States Supreme Court.

=== Federal Election Commission v. Ted Cruz for Senate ===
On January 19, 2022, Cooper argued on behalf of Ted Cruz in FEC v. Ted Cruz for Senate. In this case, the Supreme Court considered the constitutionality of provisions of the Bipartisan Campaign Reform Act (BCRA). Cooper on behalf of Cruz contended section 304 and the corresponding regulations violated the Free Speech Clause of the First Amendment.

On May 16, 2022, by a vote of 6-3, in an opinion written by Chief Justice John Roberts, the Supreme Court ruled in favour of Ted Cruz.

=== Virginia Uranium v. Warren ===
On Number 6, 2018, Cooper argued Virginia Uranium v. Warren. In that case, Cooper represented the owner of a uranium mine arguing that Virginia's ban on uranium mining was preempted by federal law and was therefore unenforceable.

=== Hollingsworth v. Perry ===
On March 26, 2013, Cooper argued Hollingsworth v. Perry. The substantive question in that case was whether the Equal Protection Clause of the Fourteenth Amendment prohibits the state of California from defining marriage as the union of one man and one woman. Cooper represented the proponents of Proposition 8, a ballot initiative adopted by the voters of California that defined marriage as being between one man and one woman.

=== South Central Bell Telephone Company v. Alabama ===
On January 19, 1999, Cooper argued the case South Central Bell Telephone Company v. Alabama. In this case, the Supreme Court considered whether Alabama's franchise tax discriminates against interstate commerce, in violation of the Commerce Clause, and whether the Alabama Supreme Court's refusal to permit the South Central Bell Telephone Company and others to raise their constitutional claims because of res judicata deprives them of the due process of law guaranteed by the Fourteenth Amendment. Cooper argued the case on behalf of the State of Alabama.

=== Clinton v. City of New York ===
On April 27, 1998, Cooper argued the case Clinton v. City of New York. In that case, the Supreme Court considered whether the President's ability to selectively cancel individual portions of bills, under the Line Item Veto Act, violated the Presentment Clause of Article I. Cooper argued this case on behalf of the City of New York.

This case has been called “the blockbuster separation of powers case of the Rehnquist years.”

=== United States v. Winstar Corp. ===
On April 24, 1996, Cooper argued the case United States v. Winstar Corp.. In that case, the Supreme Court considered the question of whether the federal government can be sued by thrifts that were sent into financial trouble when Congress changed the computation of required reserves after the Federal Home Loan Bank Board encouraged actions based on the premise that the rules would not change.

This case has been described as “enormously important” and creating an “important precedent on the interpretation of Government contracts.”

=== Federal Election Commission v. NRA Political Victory Fund ===
On October 11, 1994, Cooper argued Federal Election Commission v. NRA Political Victory Fund This case raised various questions regarding whether portions of the Federal Election Campaign Act violated the Constitutionally mandated separation of powers. Cooper represented the NRA Political Victory Fund.

=== Lee v. Weisman ===
On November 6, 1991, Cooper argued the case Lee v. Weisman. The question in that case was whether the inclusion of clergy who offer prayers at official public school ceremonies violated the Establishment Clause of the First Amendment. This case is credited for introducing the “coercion test” that has subsequently gained greater prominence in Establishment Clause jurisprudence.

== Academic Freedom and George Mason University ==
In a June 2024 argument before the 11th Circuit Court of Appeals, Cooper argued that a state can "insist that professors not offer—or espouse, I should say, and endorse—viewpoints that are contrary to the state’s.” When asked, "Could a legislature prohibit professors from saying anything negative about a current gubernatorial administration?” Cooper responded, “I think, your honor, yes, because in the classroom the professor’s speech is the government’s speech and the government can restrict professors on a content-wide basis and restrict them from offering viewpoints.”

In February 2025, Virginia Governor Glenn Youngkin appointed Cooper to the George Mason University Board of Visitors. At his first meeting of the board, Cooper reiterated his position, stating, "I believe that the authorities support the proposition that academic freedom is the University's academic freedom, and that the faculty doesn't have an academic freedom that is superior to the university's leadership itself. It is the leadership of the University that decides what can and cannot be taught, even, let alone what the University can and will endorse or will refuse to endorse in its own name."

In June 2025, the Virginia Senate Privileges and Elections Committee rejected Cooper's appointment and those of seven other appointments to university boards. Youngkin’s office argued that the committee lacked the power to reject the nominations.

== Publications ==
Cooper has published many articles in law reviews and other scholarly publications.

- "Litigation: Time to Revisit Chevron Deference?" Mississippi Law Journal (2016)
- "Confronting the Administrative State," National Affairs (Fall 2015)
- "The Constitutional Legacy of William H. Rehnquist" (West Academic Publishing, 2015)
- "Reserved Powers of the States,” The Heritage Guide to the Constitution (Fully Revised Second Edition) (2014)
- "Complete Diversity and the Closing of the Federal Courts," Harvard Journal of Law & Public Policy (Winter 2014) (with Howard C. Nielson, Jr.)
- "Tribute to Judge Mark R. Kravitz," Lewis & Clark Law Review (2014)
- "An Attack on Separation of Powers and Federal Judicial Power? An Analysis of the Constitutionality of Section 18 of the America Invents Act," Engage: The Journal of the Federalist Society Practice Groups (July 30, 2012) (with Vincent Colatriano).
- "The Regulatory Authority of the Treasury Department to Index Capital Gains for Inflation: A Sequel," Harvard Journal of Law & Public Policy (Spring 2012) (with Vincent Colatriano).
- "The Constitution in One Sentence: Understanding the Tenth Amendment," First Principles Series (Published by the Heritage Foundation) (Jan. 10, 2011)
- "Federalism and the Telephone: The Case for Preemptive Federal Deregulation in the New World of Intermodal Competition," 6 Journal on Telecommunications & High Technology Law 293 (2008) (with Brian Stuart Koukoutchos).
- "Debate on Radicals in Robes," Originalism: A Quarter-Century of Debate (2007) (with Prof. Cass Sunstein)
- "The State of the Judiciary: A Corporate Perspective," 95 The Georgetown Law Journal 1107 (April 2007) (with Larry D. Thompson)
- "A Perjurer in the White House?: The Constitutional Case for Perjury and Obstruction of Justice as High Crimes and Misdemeanors," Harvard Journal of Law & Public Policy, (Spring 1999).
- "The Geography of Race in Elections: Color-Blindness and Redistricting," The Journal of Law and Politics (Winter 1998).
- "Term Limits for Judges?," 10 The Journal of Law and Politics, 669 (1997).
- "Race, Law and Justice: The Rehnquist Court and the American Dilemma,” The American University Law Review (Feb. 1996)
- "Constitutional Constraints on the Government," published in Litigating Against The Government: Leveling The Playing Field (National Legal Center for the Public Interest (1996)).
- "The Republican Congress and the Constitution in Foreign and Military Affairs," 2 Common Sense 75 (1995) (with Prof. John McGinnis).
- "The Federal Judiciary, Life Tenure, and Self-Government," 4 Cornell Journal of Law and Public Policy 500 (1995).
- "The Fifth Annual Robert C. Byrd Conference on the Administrative Process: The First Year of Clinton/Gore: Reinventing Government or Refining Reagan/Bush Initiatives?" The Administrative Law Journal of the American University (1994)
- "The Price of 'Political Independence': The Unconstitutional Status of the Legal Services Corporation," 4 Boston University Public Interest Law Journal 13 (1994) (with Michael A. Carvin).
- "Harry Jaffa’s Bad Originalism," 1994 Public Interest Law Review 189.
- "The Legal Authority of the Department of the Treasury to Promulgate a Regulation Providing for Indexation of Capital Gains," 12 Virginia Tax Review 631 (Spring 1993) (with Michael A. Carvin and Vincent J. Colatriano).
- “Independent of Heaven Itself: Differing Federalist and Anti-Federalist Perspectives on the Centralizing Tendency of the Federal Judiciary," 16 Harvard Journal of Law & Public Policy 119 (Winter 1993).
- "A Note on Justice Marshall and Stare Decisis," 1992 The Public Interest Law Review 95.
- "Wards Cove Packing Co. v. Atonio: A Step Toward Eliminating Quotas in the American Workplace," 14 Oklahoma City University Law Review 265 (Summer 1991).
- "Executive Power Over Foreign and Military Policy: Some Remarks on the Founders’ Perspective,” 16 Oklahoma City University Law Review 265 (Summer 1991).
- "How Separation of Powers Protects Individual Liberties," 41 Rutgers Law Review 789 (Spring 1989).
- "A Slow Return To Constitutional Colorblindness," 47 Legal Times 27 (May 1, 1989).
- "The Constitutionality of Drug Testing," Federal Bar News & Journal (October 1988).
- "Presidential Powers in the Area of Foreign Affairs," 43 University of Miami Law Review 165 (September 1988).
- "The Demise of Federalism," 20 The Urban Lawyer 239 (Spring 1988).
- "Stare Decisis: Precedent and Principle in Constitutional Adjudication," 73 Cornell Law Review 801 (January 1988).
- "The Line-Item Veto: The Framers' Intentions," published in Revitalizing the Presidential Veto (National Legal Center for the Public Interest (1988)).
- "Comment on Arthur Schlesinger's 'After the Imperial Presidency,'" 47 Maryland Law Review 84 (Fall 1988).
- "Raoul Berger, Constitutionalist," 4 Benchmark 183 (July–October 1987).
- "The Collateral Attack Doctrine and the Rules of Intervention: A Judicial Pincer Movement on Due Process," 1987 University of Chicago Legal Forum 155.
- "Limited Government and Individual Liberty: The Ninth Amendment's Forgotten Lesson," 4 Journal of Law & Politics 63 (University of Virginia) (Summer 1987).
- "Constitutional Adjudication and the Intentions of the Framers," 119 Federal Rules Decisions 553 (address before the judicial conference of the U.S. Court of Appeals for the District of Columbia Circuit, May 29, 1987).
- "Landmarks of Constitutional Interpretation," 40 Policy Review 10 (Spring 1987) (with Nelson Lund).
- "Application of Section 504 of the Rehabilitation Act of 1973 to persons with AIDS," published in Aids and the Law (Wiley Law Publications 1987).
- "Survey of Legal Issues Related to Acquired Immune Deficiency Syndrome (AIDS)," published in The Medical and Legal Implications of AIDS (Virginia Bar Association, 1987).
- "The First Amendment, Original Intent and The Political Process," 10 Harvard Journal of Law & Public Policy 15 (Winter 1987).
- "The Tenth Amendment Under Fire," 73 ABA Journal 42 (May 1987).
- "The Coercive Remedies Paradox," 9 Harvard Journal of Law and Public Policy 77 (Winter 1986).
- Book Review, 24 The Atlanta Lawyer 17 (April–May 1980) (reviewing B. Woodward and S. Armstrong, The Brethren).
- "The Attorney-Client Privilege in Alabama," 28 Alabama Law Review 641 (1977).

== See also ==
- Timeline of investigations into Trump and Russia (2019)
- List of law clerks for the ninth seat of the Supreme Court of the United States
