= Frank Buckiewicz =

American football player and coach (1930–2017)

Biographical details
- Born: April 14, 1930; Perth Amboy, New Jersey, U.S.
- Died: September 5, 2017 (aged 87); Gaston, Oregon, U.S.

Playing career
- 1947–1950: Pacific (OR)

Coaching career (HC unless noted)
- 1961–1964: Portland Grant HS (OR)
- 1965–1980: Pacific (OR)

Frank Anthony Buckiewicz (April 14, 1930 – September 5, 2017) was an American football player and coach. He served as the head football coach at Pacific University in Forest Grove, Oregon, from 1965 to 1980.

Born in Perth Amboy, New Jersey, Buckiewicz graduated from Perth Amboy High School in 1947. When, Frank was the coach at Grant HS in Portland, he had a HS record of 88–23–2.
