= Grover C. Richman Jr. =

American politician (1911–1983)

Grover Cleveland Richman Jr. (October 1, 1911 – May 6, 1983) was an American lawyer who served as U.S. Attorney for the District of New Jersey from 1951 to 1953 and New Jersey Attorney General from 1954 to 1958.

== Biography ==
Richman was born in 1911 in Wenonah, New Jersey, United States. His father, Grover Richman Sr., was a deputy State Attorney General from 1920 to 1929 and assistant counsel to the New Jersey Board of Public Utilities. He attended William Penn Charter School in Philadelphia and then received his A.B. degree from Amherst College and LL.B. degree from the University of Pennsylvania Law School. He joined his father's law practice in 1936.

Richman was chief counsel to the Office of Price Administration for New Jersey's southern counties from 1941 to 1942 and assistant U.S. Attorney for the District of New Jersey from 1944 to 1951. He was promoted to U.S. Attorney in January 1951, serving until his resignation in June 1953.

In 1954, Governor Robert B. Meyner appointed him New Jersey Attorney General. Meyner nominated him for a second term in January 1958, but Albert McCay, the State Senator from Richman's home county of Burlington, exercised his right of senatorial courtesy and opposed the renomination. Despite Meyner's efforts to continue pushing through the appointment, Richman withdrew his name from consideration.

Richman returned to private practice in 1958, serving as senior partner at Richman, Ferren, Tyler & Vecchio in Haddonfield. He also served as general counsel for the New Jersey Turnpike Authority from 1958 to 1970 and as chairman of the Burlington County Bridge Commission from 1960 to 1965.

A resident of Edgewater Park Township, New Jersey, he died in 1983 of a heart ailment at the age of 71 at New York Hospital Westchester Division in White Plains, New York.

Legal offices
Preceded by Alfred E. Modarelli	United States Attorney for the District of New Jersey; 1951 – 1953	Succeeded by William F. Tompkins
Preceded by Theodore D. Parsons	Attorney General of New Jersey; 1954 – 1958	Succeeded by David D. Furman
