= John J. Degnan =

American lawyer (born 1944)

Chair of the Port Authority of New York and New Jersey
- In office July 23, 2014 – August 3, 2017
- Governor: Chris Christie
- Preceded by: David Samson
- Succeeded by: Kevin J. O'Toole

Attorney General of New Jersey
- In office January 17, 1978 – March 5, 1981
- Governor: Brendan Byrne
- Preceded by: William F. Hyland
- Succeeded by: James R. Zazzali

Personal details
- Born: October 6, 1944 (age 81) West Orange, New Jersey, U.S.
- Spouse: Mary Degnan
- Education: Saint Vincent College (BA); Harvard University (JD)

John J. Degnan (born October 6, 1944) was the Attorney General of New Jersey from 1978 until 1981. He was vice chairman and chief operating officer of The Chubb Corporation until 2010, and Chairman of the Port Authority of New York and New Jersey (PANYNJ) from 2014 to 2017.

== Background ==
Degnan attended Our Lady of Lourdes Grammar School in West Orange, New Jersey, and St. Benedict's Preparatory School in Newark. He graduated with a B.A. from Saint Vincent College in Latrobe, Pennsylvania in 1966 and then attended Harvard Law School, receiving his J.D. degree in 1969. He resides with his wife Mary in Chester Township, New Jersey.

== Career ==
From 1969 to 1971, Degnan served as law secretary to John J. Francis, associate justice of the New Jersey Supreme Court. He then joined the Newark law firm of Clapp & Eisenberg from 1971 to 1974.

Degnan was selected by New Jersey Governor Brendan Byrne as assistant counsel in November 1974. He later served as Governor Byrne's executive secretary from March 1976 to March 1977, when he became special counsel to the Governor. After Byrne was elected to a second term, he announced Degnan's appointment as Attorney General. His nomination was confirmed in January 1978, and at 33 he was among the youngest ever to serve as Attorney General.

In 1981, Degnan resigned his position as Attorney General to run in the Democratic primary for Governor. The crowded field of 13 Democratic candidates included U.S. Representative James Florio, Newark Mayor Kenneth A. Gibson, New Jersey Senate President Joseph P. Merlino, U.S. Representative Robert A. Roe, and Jersey City Mayor Thomas F. X. Smith. Degnan was seen as Byrne's hand-picked successor and received the Governor's endorsement. But in the primary election Degnan received only 11 percent of the vote, finishing in fifth place behind Florio (26 percent), Roe (16 percent), Gibson (16 percent), and Merlino (11 percent).

After the election Degnan joined the firm of Shanley & Fisher as a senior partner. In 1990, he joined Chubb & Son, a subsidiary of Chubb Corp., as senior vice president and general counsel. He was elected president of Chubb Corp. in 1996 and also became president of Chubb & Son in 1998. In 2002, he became vice chairman and chief administrative officer of Chubb Corp. He added the titles of chief ethics and legal compliance officer in 2005. In June 2008, was promoted to vice chairman and chief operating officer of Chubb Corp before retiring in 2010.

== Port Authority of New York and New Jersey ==
Governor Chris Christie nominated Degnan on April 29, 2014, to succeed embattled David Samson as Chairman of the Port Authority of New York and New Jersey. Procedurally, the New Jersey Senate would vote to place him on the PA Board of Commissioners, and then the Board itself would approve him as Chairman. He was confirmed by full Senate on July 10, 2014.

At Senate hearings in July 2014, Degnan, in regard to the Fort Lee George Washington Bridge lane closures of September 2013 said "If the lanes were closed as an act of political retribution against the mayor of Fort Lee or any other individual and not part of a legitimate traffic study, and that seems to be validated by some of the evidence, it's an outrageous misuse of office." During his tenure as chairman he opposed dissolving the PANYNJ in its entirety, believing any changes made to the mission of agency should involve state legislatures and governors in both states.

He supported 2011 toll hikes based on PANYNJ capital improvement plan but acknowledged the process to enact them as "terrible" and commissioners' non-attendance at public hearings "an insult to the public." He stated intentions to improve the agency response to sunshine laws and whistleblower laws. As one of his first tasks he toured the outdated and over capacity Port Authority Bus Terminal to plan improvements for the facility that handles 225,000 passenger-trips per day, mostly New Jerseyans.

In 2017, Kevin J. O'Toole replaced Degnan as Chair of the Port Authority of New York and New Jersey.

Legal offices
Preceded by William F. Hyland	Attorney General of New Jersey; 1978–1981	Succeeded by James R. Zazzali
Political offices
Preceded by David Samson	Chairman of the Port Authority of New York and New Jersey; 2014–2017	Succeeded by Kevin J. O'Toole
