= Bony Ramirez =

Dominican-American visual artist (born 1996)

- Born: 1996 (age 29–30); Tenares, Dominican Republic
- Occupation: Visual artist
- Known for: Paintings, sculptures, installations

Bony Ramirez (born 1996) is a Dominican-born American self-taught painter and visual artist based in Perth Amboy, New Jersey and Harlem, New York. Ramirez works primarily in paintings, sculptures, and installations that comment on elements of Caribbean visual and material culture.

== Biography ==
Ramirez was born in the city of Tenares, in the Dominican Republic. He emigrated to the United States with his nuclear family when he was thirteen years old. His parents told the artist and his brother that they would go on a trip to Disney, and the Ramirez family established a home in Perth Amboy, New Jersey, where he attended Perth Amboy High School. As Ramirez could not afford an arts degree after finishing high school, he went on to work in construction with his uncle. During his construction years, to develop a more sustainable and affordable artistic practice, he used to buy paintings from thrift stores in order to reuse their canvases. By repurposing old canvases from second-hand paintings, Ramirez created a practice that he still uses today except with a few more resourceful modifications.

== Artistic practice ==
Ramirez's paintings, drawings, sculptures, and installations often evoke personal memories and shared histories of the artist's upbringing. His colorful and intentionally disproportionate figurative paintings draw from magical realism and religious motifs within traditional art history to represent Caribbean culture and history. Among the artist's art historical interests is the portraiture of the European Mannerist movement and its stylistic colonial influence across Latin America and the Caribbean. Because his mother was a church-goer back in the Dominican Republic, religious objects from the Renaissance play an important part in Ramirez's visual cues. As he was exposed to catholic symbols at a young age and his sculptures can sometime relate to religious stories.

The fauna and flora of the Caribbean are often depicted in Ramirez's paintings and visual worlds, plantain and coconut trees, machetes and knives, seashells and crabs, appear repeatedly creating a taxonomy of the region. In a 2020 interview, the artist talks about the importance of bilingual titles in his artworks and how they are presented both in Spanish and English.

== Career ==
He have had the following one person exhibitions Musa x Paradisiaca (2020) at Thierry Goldberg gallery, New York; Noblesse Oblige (2021) at Bradley Ertaskiran in Montreal, Canada; and Pa'l Pati' (2022) at Calderon Gallery, New York.

Ramirez was featured in The Artsy Vanguard 2021, published by Artsy, among twenty other artists. His work was featured in The New York Times review of collective exhibition Shattered Glass at Jeffrey Deitch gallery in Los Angeles, California.

In 2022, he was included in the list Forbes 30 Under 30, in the Art and Style section. His painting Maria (2022) was exhibited in the group show Miami is Not the Caribbean. Yet it Feels Like it, at Oolite Arts space in Miami. The painting depicts a central figure of a woman and child standing up on a tree branch and surrounded by a body of water under a blue sky, on the back of the picture, coconut trees are being blown by a heavy wind.

In Spring 2023, the one person exhibition Bony Ramirez: Caribaby was presented at the Sugar Hill Children's Museum at the historic community of Sugar Hill in Harlem, New York. The show included paintings, drawings, installations, and sculptures made of found materials to celebrate Caribbean material culture and natural landscapes.

Ramirez received a solo show at Jeffrey Deitch's gallery in New York. The exhibition Bony Ramirez: Tropical Apex presented in Fall of 2023, featured a number of paintings and sculptures that relate to Ramirez's lived experience in the Dominican Republic and the United States. In the show, on top of his figurative colorful paintings, the artist's interest in taxidermy and the Caribbean fauna is represented through a bullhead attached to a wood panel placed at the entrance of the exhibition and by representations of cockfighting.

In 2024, Ramirez is presenting the solo show Bony Ramirez: Cattleya at the Newark Museum of Art. The installation is organized in dialogue with the institution's collection.

== Collections ==
Ramirez's work Fiera: Views from the Outside (2021) is on view in the collection display at the Pérez Art Museum Miami, Florida. The painting Adonde están los aguacates? - Where Are the Avocados? (2021) has entered the collection of the Institute of Contemporary Art, Miami. The Museum of Fine Arts, Boston; and the X Museum, in Beijing, have also acquired Ramirez's work for their collection.
