= Paula Dow =

American lawyer (born 1955)

Paula T. Dow

58th New Jersey Attorney General
- In office January 18, 2010 – January 10, 2012
- Governor: Chris Christie
- Preceded by: Anne Milgram
- Succeeded by: Jeffrey S. Chiesa

Essex County Prosecutor
- In office June 30, 2005 – January 18, 2010
- Preceded by: Donald Campolo (Acting)
- Succeeded by: Robert D. Laurino (Acting)

Personal details
- Born: 1955 (age 70–71)
- Party: Democratic
- Education: Franklin & Marshall College (BA); University of Pennsylvania Law School (JD)
- Profession: Attorney

Paula T. Dow (born 1955) is an American lawyer and judge. She served as the 58th Attorney General of New Jersey, appointed by incoming Governor Chris Christie. Her nomination to a full term was confirmed by the New Jersey Senate in February 2010. She is the first African-American woman to be attorney general in state history.

On December 12, 2011, Christie announced that Dow would temporarily become the First Deputy General Counsel for the Port Authority of New York and New Jersey and that he had nominated Jeffrey S. Chiesa, then Christie's chief counsel, to become the new Attorney General. The governor also said he would file a notice of intent to nominate Dow to a Superior Court judgeship in Essex County. Chiesa was sworn in as Dow's successor on January 10, 2012.

== Early life and education ==
Dow was born in 1955. She was raised in Yeadon, Pennsylvania, located outside of Philadelphia. She graduated from Franklin & Marshall College with a B.A. degree in 1977. She received her J.D. degree from the University of Pennsylvania Law School in 1980.

== Career ==
In 1978, she worked as a summer associate for the Camden law firm Tomar, Parks, Seliger, Simonoff & Adourian. From 1980 to 1987 she worked as a lawyer for Exxon in Texas, New Jersey and New York, advising on environmental and labor issues.

Dow joined the office of the United States District Court for the Southern District of New York in 1987, working in the Civil Division until 1994. She then moved to the office of the United States Attorney for the District of New Jersey, working there from 1994 to 2003. From 2002 to 2003 she served as counsel to U.S. Attorney Chris Christie.

=== Essex County Prosecutor ===
In 2003, Dow was nominated by Governor Jim McGreevey to be Essex County Prosecutor. She was opposed by some local leaders, such as Newark Mayor Sharpe James.

State senators from Essex County blocked her confirmation, saying that they had not been consulted by McGreevey on the appointment. After serving as Acting Prosecutor for two years, she was sworn in as Prosecutor in June 2005 by Governor Richard Codey.

=== New Jersey Attorney General ===
On December 15, 2009, in his first cabinet announcement, then-Governor-elect Chris Christie nominated Dow as Attorney General of New Jersey. Her appointment made her the first African-American woman to hold the position.

She became Acting Attorney General on January 19, 2010. On February 8, the Senate Judiciary Committee unanimously approved her nomination to a full term. The full Senate unanimously confirmed her nomination on February 22, and she was sworn in the following day. In 2011, Governor Chris Christie named Dow to a position at the Port Authority of New York and New Jersey.

=== Superior Court appointment ===
In 2012, a New Jersey Senate Committee approved Governor Christie's nomination of Dow to a judgeship on the Superior Court. Dow became a judge in the Family Court Division in Burlington County, where she sat until December 2015, when she was assigned to the General Equity Part. As of April 9, 2025 she has since retired.

== Personal life ==
Dow lives in Lumberton, New Jersey and is a single mother of two.

== See also ==
- List of female state attorneys general in the United States

Legal offices
Preceded by Donald Campolo (Acting)	Essex County Prosecutor; 2003 – 2010	Succeeded by Robert D. Laurino (Acting)
Preceded by Anne Milgram	Attorney General of New Jersey; 2010 – 2012	Succeeded by Jeffrey S. Chiesa
