= Perth Amboy Public Schools =

School district in Middlesex County, New Jersey, US

Coordinates: 40.512262°N 74.268285°W

Address
- 178 Barracks Street Perth Amboy, Middlesex County, New Jersey, 08861; United States

District information
- Grades: PreK to 12
- Superintendent: David A. Roman
- Business administrator: Michael LoBrace (acting)
- Schools: 12
- Affiliation(s): Former Abbott district

Students and staff
- Enrollment: 10,786 (as of 2020–21)
- Faculty: 898.7 FTEs
- Student–teacher ratio: 12.0:1

Other information
- District Factor Group: A
- Website: www.paps.net
| Ind. | Per pupil | District spending | Rank (*) | K-12 average | %± vs. average |
|---|---|---|---|---|---|
| 1A | Total Spending | $19,578 | 69 | $18,891 | 3.6% |
| 1 | Budgetary Cost | 15,759 | 75 | 14,783 | 6.6% |
| 2 | Classroom Instruction | 9,850 | 88 | 8,763 | 12.4% |
| 6 | Support Services | 2,306 | 52 | 2,392 | −3.6% |
| 8 | Administrative Cost | 1,213 | 16 | 1,485 | −18.3% |
| 10 | Operations & Maintenance | 1,957 | 81 | 1,783 | 9.8% |
| 13 | Extracurricular Activities | 124 | 7 | 268 | −53.7% |
| 16 | Median Teacher Salary | 63,650 | 44 | 64,043 |
Data from NJDoE 2014 Taxpayers' Guide to Education Spending. *Of K-12 districts with more than 3,500 students. Lowest spending=1; Highest=103

Perth Amboy Public Schools is a community public school district serving students in pre-kindergarten through twelfth grade, located in the city of Perth Amboy, in Middlesex County, in the U.S. state of New Jersey. The district is one of 31 former Abbott districts statewide that were established pursuant to the decision by the New Jersey Supreme Court in Abbott v. Burke which are now referred to as "SDA Districts" based on the requirement for the state to cover all costs for school building and renovation projects in these districts under the supervision of the New Jersey Schools Development Authority.

As of the 2020–21 school year, the district, comprised of 12 schools, had an enrollment of 10,786 students and 898.7 classroom teachers (on an FTE basis), for a student–teacher ratio of 12.0:1.

The district is classified by the New Jersey Department of Education as being in District Factor Group "A", the lowest of eight groupings. District Factor Groups organize districts statewide to allow comparison by common socioeconomic characteristics of the local districts. From lowest socioeconomic status to highest, the categories are A, B, CD, DE, FG, GH, I and J.

== Schools ==
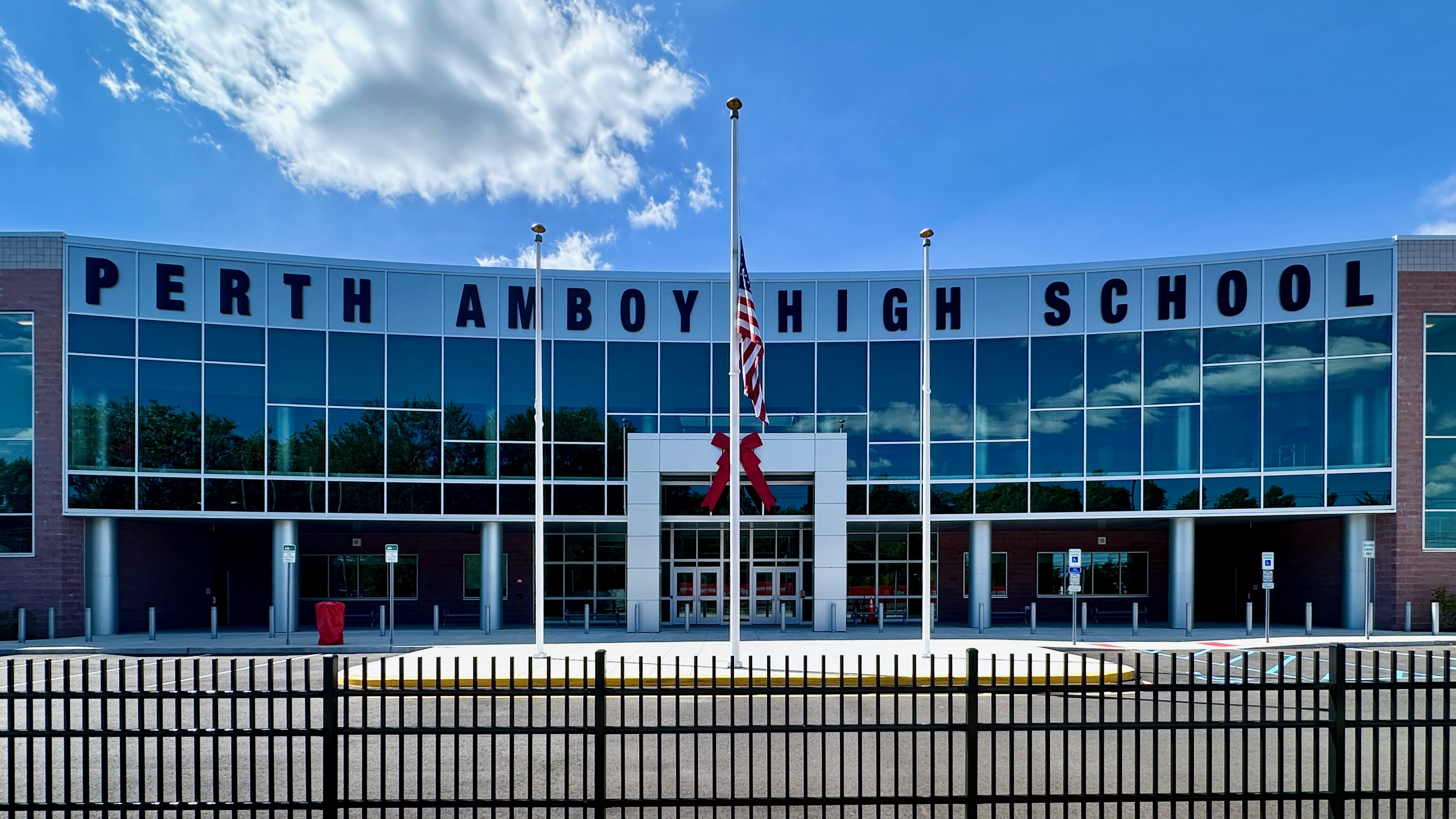
Perth Amboy High School

Schools in the district (with 2020–21 enrollment data from the National Center for Education Statistics) are:

Early childhood schools

- Ignacio Cruz Early Childhood Center (667 students; in PreK)
  - Susan Roque, principal
- Edmund Hmieleski Jr. Early Childhood Center (362; PreK)
  - Jeri Mast, principal
- School #7 Early Childhood Center (NA; PreK)
  - Susan Roque, principal

Elementary schools

- Anthony V. Ceres Elementary School (581; K-4)
  - Derrick Kyriacou, principal
- James J. Flynn Elementary School (550; K-4)
  - Regina Postogna, principal
- Rose M. Lopez Elementary School (812; K-3)
  - Edwin Nieves, principal
- Edward J. Patten Elementary Elementary School (660; K-4)
  - Lauren Marrocco, principal
- Dr. Herbert N. Richardson 21st Century Elementary School (491; K-4)
  - Ronald Mascenik, principal
- Robert N. Wilentz Elementary School (637; K-4)
  - Robyn Carrera, principal

Middle schools

- Dual Language School (397; 4-8)
  - Jose Santos, principal
- William C. McGinnis Middle School (1,398; 5-8)
  - David Loniewski Jr., principal
- Samuel E. Shull Middle School (1,410; 5-8)
  - Jennifer Joseph, principal

High school

- Perth Amboy High School (2,547; 9-12)
  - Michael Heidelberg, principal
- Freshman Academy
  - Keith Guarino, principal

Adult school

- Adult Education Center
  - Fred Geardino, principaland director

== Central administration ==
Core members of the district's administration are:

- David A. Roman, superintendent of schools
- Michael LoBrace, acting business administrator and board secretary

== Board of education ==
The district's board of education, comprised of nine members, sets policy and oversees the fiscal and educational operation of the district through its administration. As a Type II school district, the board's trustees are elected directly by voters to serve three-year terms of office on a staggered basis, with three seats up for election each year held (since 2013) as part of the November general election. The board appoints a superintendent to oversee the district's day-to-day operations and a business administrator to supervise the business functions of the district.
