= Gene Hubka =

American football player (1924–2017)

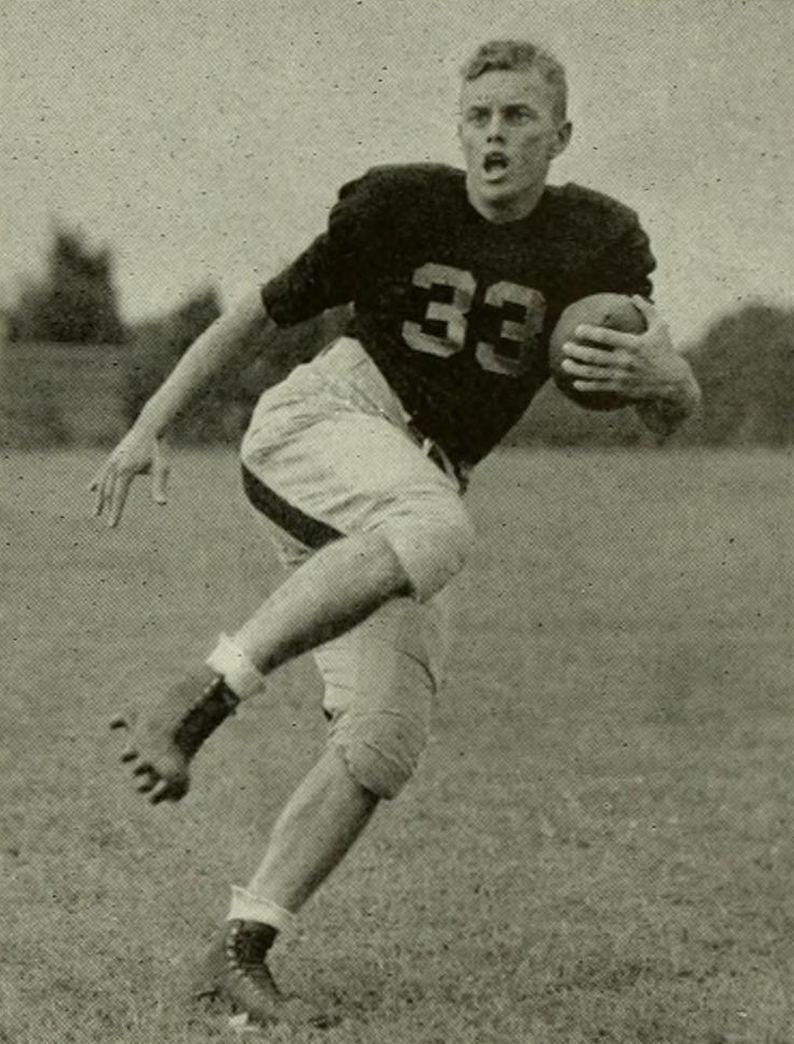
- Hubka pictured c. 1944 at Bucknell

Profile
- Position: Tailback

Personal information
- Born: May 18, 1924; Perth Amboy, New Jersey
- Died: December 3, 2017 (aged 93); Manahawkin, New Jersey
- Listed height: 5 ft 11 in (1.80 m)
- Listed weight: 175 lb (79 kg)

Career information
- High school: Perth Amboy (NJ)
- College: Temple, Bucknell

Career history
- Pittsburgh Steelers (1947)
- Stats at Pro Football Reference

Eugene Lewis Hubka (May 18, 1924 – December 3, 2017) was an American football tailback who played for the Pittsburgh Steelers. He played college football at Bucknell University, having previously attended Perth Amboy High School in Perth Amboy, New Jersey. He was a member of the Bucknell Hall of Fame (inducted 1987). Hubka died on December 3, 2017, at the age of 93.
