= George F. Kugler Jr. =

American politician

Attorney General of New Jersey
- In office 1970–1974
- Governor: William T. Cahill
- Preceded by: Arthur J. Sills
- Succeeded by: William F. Hyland

Personal details
- Born: March 26, 1925 Woodbury, New Jersey, U.S.
- Died: August 1, 2004 (aged 79) Virtua-West Jersey Hospital, Berlin, U.S.
- Education: Peddie School; Temple University (BS); Rutgers University, Camden (LLB)

George Francis Kugler Jr. (March 26, 1925 – August 1, 2004) was an American lawyer who served as New Jersey Attorney General from 1970 to 1974.

== Biography ==
Kugler was born on March 26, 1925, in Woodbury, New Jersey. He attended the Peddie School in Hightstown, graduating in 1943. He enlisted in the United States Navy after graduation, serving in the Pacific Theater of Operations in World War II. He was discharged in 1946 and then attended Temple University, receiving a B.S. degree in 1950. He attended Rutgers School of Law–Camden, where he was Associate Editor of the Law Review, and received his LL.B. degree in 1953.

Kugler worked for many years as a civil trial attorney with the Camden law firm Brown, Connery, Kulp, & Wille. He was certified in the U.S. District Court for the District of New Jersey in 1954, the U.S. Supreme Court in 1957, and the U.S. Third Circuit Court of Appeals in 1960.

In 1970, Governor William T. Cahill appointed him New Jersey Attorney General. He is credited with professionalizing the Attorney General's office, transforming it into a nonpolitical prosecutorial agency. He served until 1974.

Kugler returned to private practice, working as civil litigator with the Haddonfield firm of Archer & Greiner. He died in 2004 at the age of 79 at Virtua-West Jersey Hospital in Berlin. He was survived by his wife, the former Gloria Hicks, and their four sons: George F. Kugler III; Robert B. Kugler, judge of the United States District Court for the District of New Jersey; Jeffrey R. Kugler; and Pete Kugler, who played for several years in the National Football League for the San Francisco 49ers, including in three Super Bowls and was a resident of Cherry Hill, New Jersey.

Legal offices
Preceded by Arthur J. Sills	Attorney General of New Jersey; 1970–1974	Succeeded by William F. Hyland
