= New Jersey State Commission of Investigation =

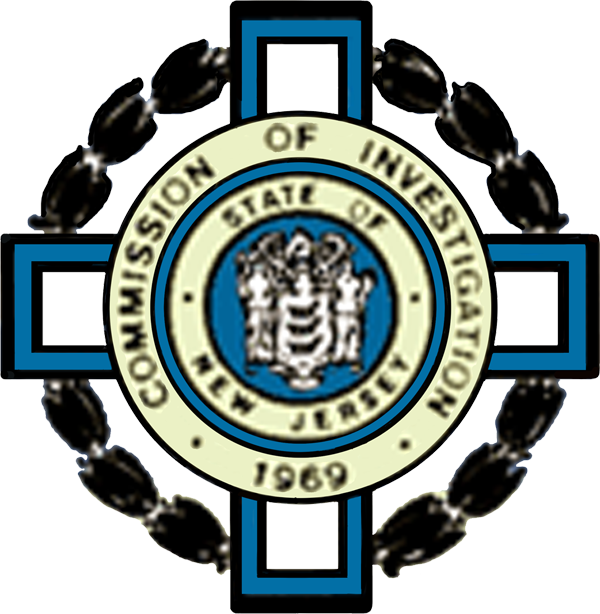

Agency overview
- Formed: 1969
- Jurisdiction: New Jersey
- Headquarters: 50 West State Street, 14th Floor, Trenton, NJ 08625-0045
- Parent agency: New Jersey State Legislature
- Website: http://www.nj.gov/sci/

The New Jersey State Commission of Investigation (SCI) is an independent governmental fact-finding agency in the U.S. State of New Jersey whose mission is to identify and investigate organized crime, corruption and waste, fraud and abuse in government spending by state, municipal and school bodies.

== History ==
The New Jersey Legislature created the SCI in 1968 as part of a package of legislation supported by Governor Richard J. Hughes to combat organized crime. A legislative committee studying organized crime and the state's criminal justice system had recommended establishing both an independent investigative commission and a Division of Criminal Justice under the attorney general.

The commission was initially authorized for a term running from January 1, 1969, through December 31, 1974. The Legislature repeatedly extended its authorization before making it a permanent agency in January 2002.

== Organization and powers ==
The commission has four members: two appointed by the governor and one each by the Senate president and the Assembly speaker. Members serve staggered four-year terms, and no more than two may belong to the same political party. The SCI is funded through the Legislature and operates independently of the executive branch. Its members and staff are prohibited from participating in non-federal political activity in New Jersey.

The SCI can hold public and private hearings, issue subpoenas to compel testimony and the production of evidence, and grant witnesses limited immunity from prosecution. It makes its findings public through reports and hearings and recommends changes to laws and government operations. The commission does not prosecute criminal cases and refers information suggesting criminal misconduct to the New Jersey Attorney General.

== Investigations ==
In October 1969, the commission reported on organized crime in New Jersey's garbage industry. Its recommendations led to the enactment of the New Jersey Antitrust Act and legislation providing for state licensing and regulation of the garbage industry in 1970.

In December 2011, the commission published Industrious Subversion, a report on organized crime in waste disposal and recycling. The report described businesses with undisclosed owners, consultants, and middlemen linked to organized crime, and recommended broader licensing requirements and stronger enforcement.

== See also ==
- List of law enforcement agencies in New Jersey
