= Jeffrey Chiesa =

American politician (born 1965)

Jeff Chiesa
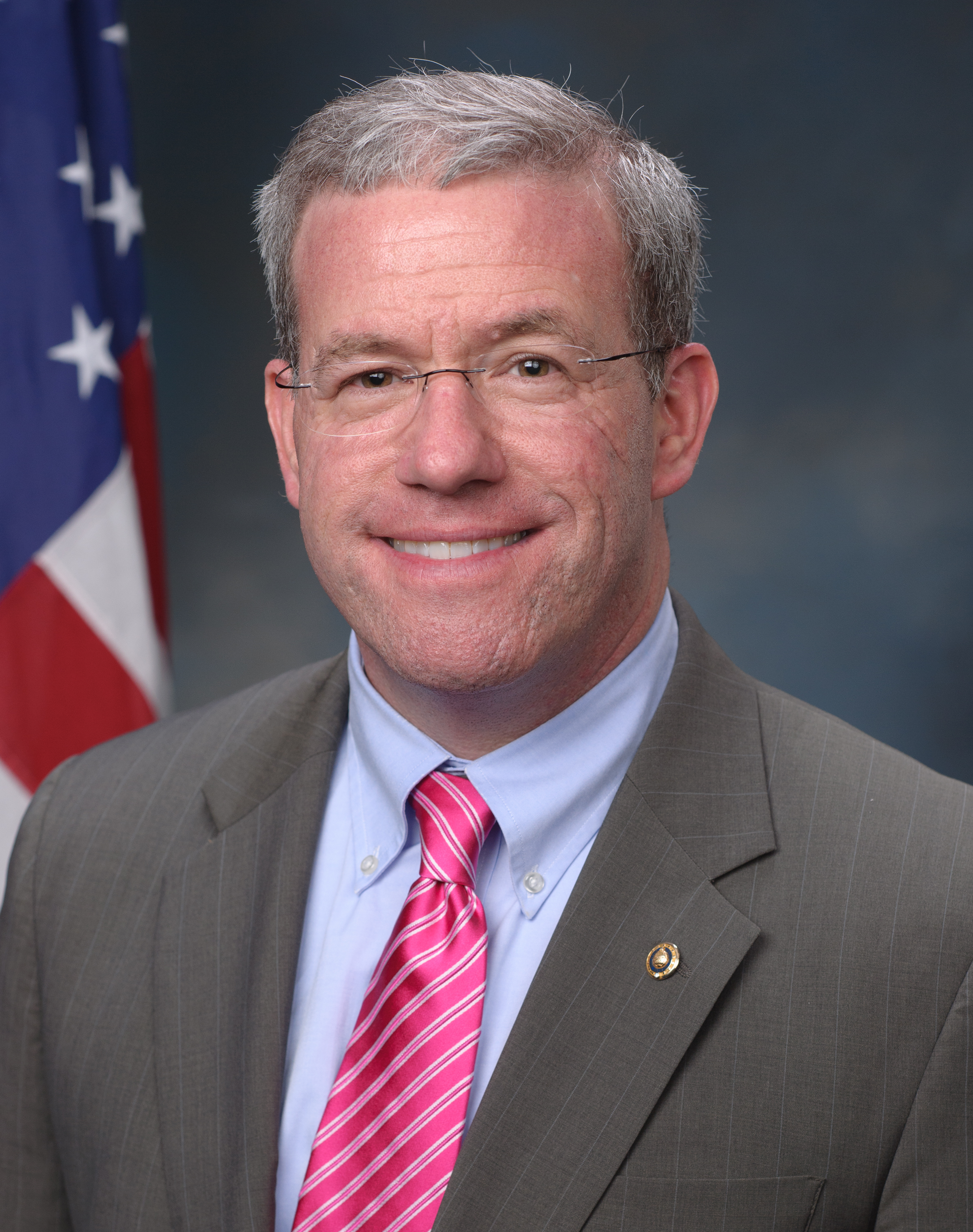
- Official portrait, 2013

United States Senator from New Jersey
- In office June 6, 2013 – October 30, 2013
- Appointed by: Chris Christie
- Preceded by: Frank Lautenberg
- Succeeded by: Cory Booker

59th Attorney General of New Jersey
- In office January 10, 2012 – June 6, 2013
- Governor: Chris Christie
- Preceded by: Paula Dow
- Succeeded by: John Hoffman (acting)

Personal details
- Born: Jeffrey Scott Chiesa; June 22, 1965 (age 60) Bound Brook, New Jersey, U.S.
- Party: Republican
- Spouse: Jenny Sullivan
- Education: University of Notre Dame (BBA); Catholic University (JD)
- Chiesa's voice Chiesa questioning witnesses on inter-agency information sharing at a Senate Homeland Security Committee hearing. Recorded September 11, 2013

Jeffrey Scott Chiesa (/ˌkiːˈeɪzə/ kee-AY-zə; born June 22, 1965) is an American lawyer and politician who served as a United States senator from New Jersey from June 6 to October 30, 2013. As a member of the Republican Party, he previously served as the 59th attorney general of New Jersey from January 10, 2012, until June 6, 2013.

Prior to his tenure as New Jersey Attorney General, he served as Chief Counsel to New Jersey Governor Chris Christie. Christie announced on June 6, 2013, that he would appoint Chiesa to the United States Senate seat that was vacated by the death of Democratic Senator Frank Lautenberg; four days later, Chiesa was sworn in, becoming the first Republican senator of New Jersey since Nicholas F. Brady. He declined to run for the remainder of the Senate term in the 2013 special election, which was subsequently won by Democrat Cory Booker, Mayor of Newark.

To date, Chiesa is the last Republican to serve as a U.S. senator from New Jersey.

== Early life, education and early law career ==
Chiesa grew up in Bound Brook, New Jersey, the eldest of three children. When he was 8 years old, his father, a chemical plant worker, died, and he was raised by his mother, a public school teacher. He attended Bound Brook High School and graduated from the University of Notre Dame in 1987 with a Bachelor of Business Administration degree in accounting. He earned his J.D. from the Columbus School of Law at The Catholic University of America in 1990.

In 1988, Chiesa joined the Cranford law firm of Dughi, Hewit & Palatucci (now known as Dughi & Hewit). There he met and befriended Chris Christie, who had joined the firm the year before.

== U.S. Attorney's Office ==
In 2002, he followed Christie to the office of the United States Attorney for the District of New Jersey, where he led a number of the office's high-profile public corruption cases, including the one against former State Senate President John A. Lynch Jr. He served as counsel to the U.S. Attorney, Chief of the Public Protection Unit, and Executive Assistant U.S. Attorney. He left in 2009 to become a partner in the firm of Wolff & Samson.

== Chief Counsel to Governor Christie ==
In 2009, after Christie was elected Governor of New Jersey, Chiesa headed his transition team. Christie then named Chiesa his chief counsel. In June 2010, Christie sent him to speak to Republican Assemblyman Michael Patrick Carroll, to persuade him to drop his opposition to the budget because it cut proportionally more aid to suburban schools than to urban ones.

== Attorney General of New Jersey ==
On December 12, 2011, Governor Christie nominated Chiesa to succeed Paula Dow as Attorney General of New Jersey. Chiesa was sworn in as Dow's successor on January 10, 2012.

Chiesa supported mandatory drug rehab treatment for non-violent drug offenders and holding violent defendants without bail. In January 2012, he proposed a comprehensive program to crack down on prescription drug abuse addictions and overdoses.

In February 2012, he helped deliver $837.7 million to distressed homeowners of New Jersey from a settlement with major banks. The state had 10.6% of homeowners who are 90 or more days delinquent on their mortgage, the third-highest percentage in the nation at the time.

In April 2012, he announced the arrest of three men accused of theft at several Home Depot stores across five states: New Jersey, Pennsylvania, Delaware, Maryland, and New York. They were "under-ringing" their purchases at self-checkout machines and were charged with more than 500 illegal transactions totaling more than $100,000. In the same month, he announced the arrests of 27 people in a major child pornography incident, that required the involvement of more than 100 law enforcement officers for "Operation Watchdog". He also filed a lawsuit against John Kot and Gabriel R. DaSilva of leading home improvement companies for defrauding people and breaking several laws.

== U.S. Senate ==
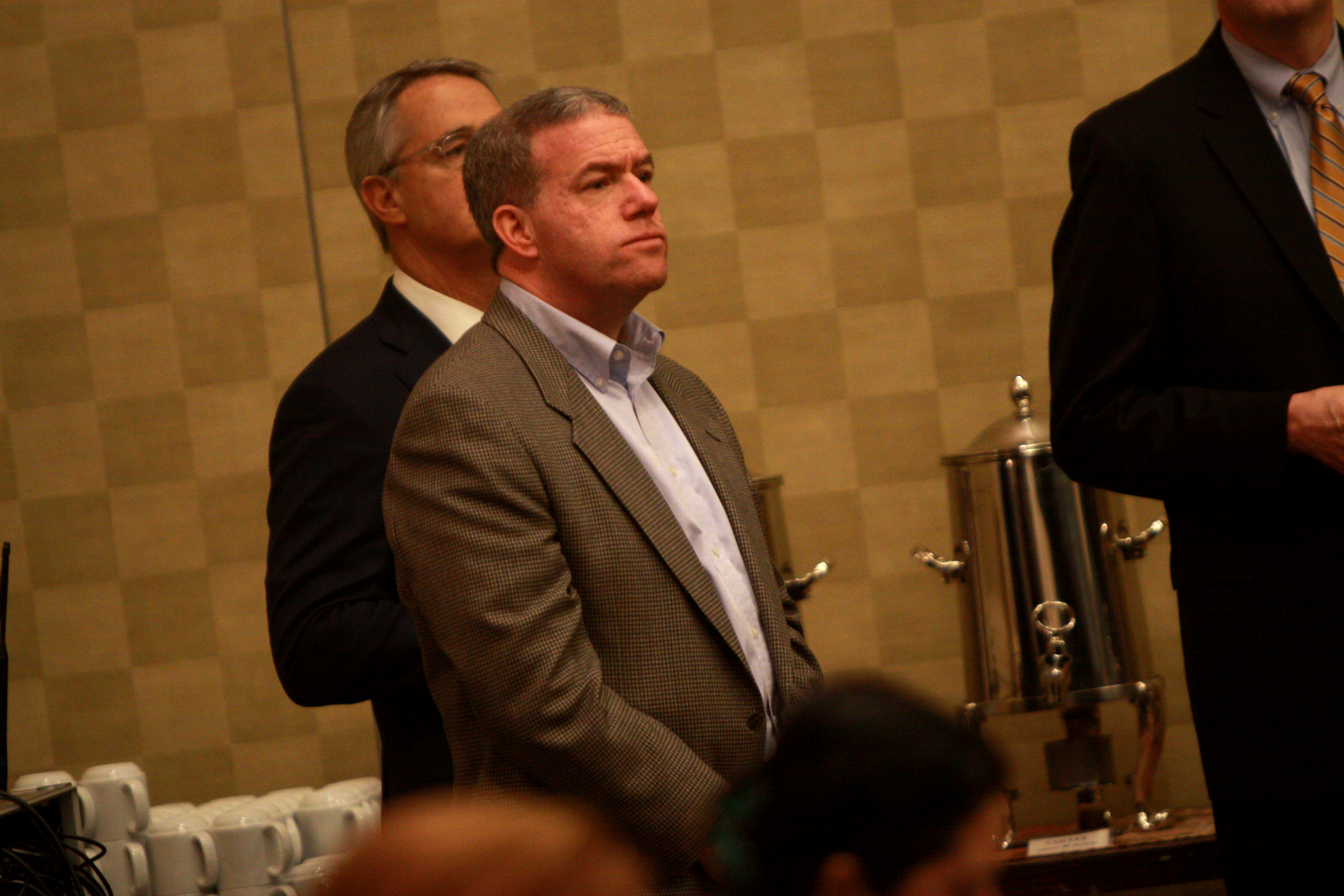
Chiesa in November 2013, following his departure from the Senate

On June 6, 2013, Governor Chris Christie announced that he would appoint Chiesa, a resident of Branchburg, New Jersey, to succeed recently deceased United States Senator Frank Lautenberg. Chiesa announced that he would not seek election to the seat in the 2013 special election. In the news conference, he said that "I'm a conservative Republican, generally speaking." In regard to immigration reform, he stated, "I think the first thing we have to do is make sure the borders are secure."

Chiesa resigned as Attorney General on June 6, 2013, and Executive Assistant Attorney General John Jay Hoffman became acting Attorney General. Chiesa was sworn into the Senate on June 10, 2013, by Vice President Joe Biden. Chiesa was the only Republican senator to represent New Jersey since 1982 when then-Governor Thomas Kean appointed Nicholas F. Brady to the Senate in order to fill a vacancy; in that case, the seat was subsequently won by Lautenberg for the first time.

Chiesa's vote was seen as crucial to the passing of the Border Security, Economic Opportunity, and Immigration Modernization Act of 2013. John McCain joked that "I'm going to subject him to intense interrogation—I may waterboard the guy. Or maybe tell him that he's either going to support this legislation or hire someone to start his car in the morning." He ultimately voted for the bill, which prompted conservative commentator Ann Coulter to proclaim that Christie was "dead to me" for appointing Chiesa to the Senate. In July 2013, he signed the Mike Lee letter which called for an amendment to the continuing resolution that would defund the Patient Protection and Affordable Care Act. He opposed Democratic attempts to reinsert funding for the Affordable Care Act but ultimately voted for the Reid-McConnell bill to end the shutdown.

He used his time in the Senate to try to draw attention to the issue of human trafficking and, according to The Washington Post, voted with his party 84% of the time. He left the Senate on October 31, 2013, when Newark Mayor Cory Booker, who won the special election, was sworn in. Chiesa recorded a tenure of 129 days, the fourth-shortest of the 65 U.S. Senators who have served in New Jersey's history.

Chiesa ruled out the possibility of running for the seat in the regularly scheduled 2014 election, but said that he would consider running for office in the future.

=== Committee assignments ===
- Committee on Commerce, Science, and Transportation
  - Subcommittee on Consumer Protection, Product Safety, and Insurance
- Committee on Homeland Security and Governmental Affairs
- Committee on Committee on Small Business and Entrepreneurship

== Atlantic City state takeover ==
Chiesa was appointed by Christie to oversee the state takeover of Atlantic City in 2016. His private firm is to bill the state for their services.

Legal offices
| Preceded by Paula Dow | Attorney General of New Jersey; 2012–2013 | Succeeded by John Hoffman; Acting |
U.S. Senate
| Preceded by Frank Lautenberg | United States Senator (Class 2) from New Jersey; 2013; Served alongside: Bob Menendez | Succeeded by Cory Booker |
U.S. order of precedence (ceremonial)
| Preceded by Jon Corzine as Former U.S. Senator | Order of precedence of the United States | Succeeded by George Helmy as Former U.S. Senator |
