= David T. Wilentz =

American politician (1894–1988)

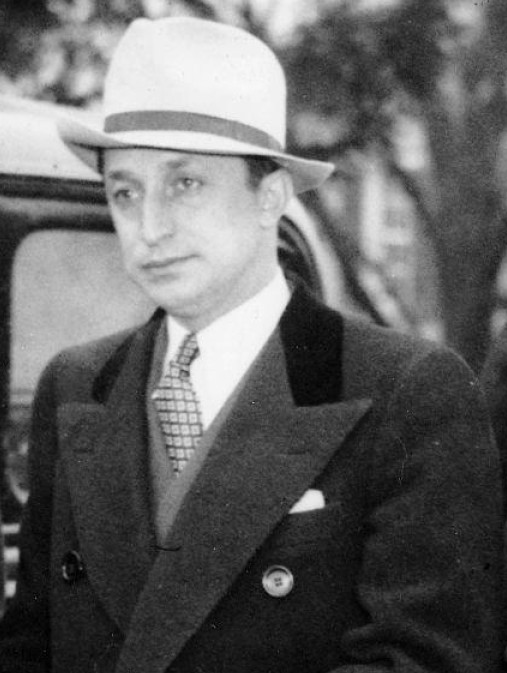
- Wilentz in 1935

Attorney General of New Jersey
- In office February 4, 1934 – February 4, 1944
- Governor: A. Harry Moore
- Preceded by: William A. Stevens
- Succeeded by: Walter D. Van Riper

Personal details
- Born: December 21, 1894 Dvinsk, Russian Empire
- Died: July 6, 1988 (aged 93) Long Branch, New Jersey, U.S.
- Party: Democratic
- Spouse: Lena Goldman (m. 1919)
- Children: 3, including Robert and Warren
- Education: New York Law School (LLB)

David Theodore Wilentz (December 21, 1894 – July 6, 1988) was the Attorney General of New Jersey from 1934 to 1944. In 1935 he successfully prosecuted Bruno Hauptmann in the Lindbergh kidnapping trial. He was the father of Robert Wilentz, Chief Justice of the New Jersey Supreme Court from 1979 to 1996, as well as Norma Hess, wife of Leon Hess, founder of Hess Corporation and Warren Wilentz

== Early career ==
Wilentz was born in Dvinsk in the Russian Empire (now Daugavpils, Latvia) on December 21, 1894. The following year he emigrated with his parents to the United States, settling in Perth Amboy, New Jersey. He graduated from Perth Amboy High School in 1912. Upon graduation he worked at the Perth Amboy Evening News, eventually becoming sports editor (replacing future Governor of New Jersey Harold Hoffman). He was also manager of the local basketball team.

In World War I he served in the United States Army, entering as a private and receiving an honorable discharge as a lieutenant.

He commuted to Manhattan to attend night classes at New York Law School, receiving his LL.B. degree in 1917. He was admitted to the New Jersey Bar in 1919. In the same year he married Lena Goldman (December 25, 1898 – June 10, 1991) and they settled in Perth Amboy. Wilentz entered private practice there and also became involved in local Democratic politics.

In 1928 he was appointed City Attorney of Perth Amboy, and was elected Democratic chairman for Middlesex County in the same year. Governor A. Harry Moore appointed Wilentz Attorney General of New Jersey on February 5, 1934. The appointment was at the behest of Democratic political boss Frank Hague, but Wilentz was reported to have told Hague, "If I take the office, I will be no dummy."

== Lindbergh kidnapping trial ==
Charles A. Lindbergh, Jr., infant son of Charles Lindbergh and Anne Morrow Lindbergh, had been abducted from the family home in Hopewell, New Jersey on March 1, 1932. The child's body was found two months later a few miles from the Lindberghs' home, but the arrest of Bruno Hauptmann, a German carpenter, was not made until September 19, 1934. Over $14,000 in ransom money was found in Hauptmann's garage, and wood found in his home was said to match the ladder used in the kidnapping.

The trial began on January 2, 1935, with Wilentz prosecuting. Press descriptions of the trial often focused on his sharp tongue and natty attire. Wilentz had no previous experience in trying criminal cases, but he was certain he could secure the conviction and execution of Hauptmann, whom he called "Public Enemy Number One of the World."

Wilentz built his case against Hauptmann on mostly circumstantial evidence, supported by both eyewitness and expert witness testimony. Expert witnesses included handwriting expert Albert Osborn, who testified that Hauptmann had written the ransom notes, and wood expert Arthur Koehler, who testified that the wood used to construct the ladder found at the scene of the kidnapping came from Hauptmann's attic. Wilentz's final star witness was John F. Condon, Lindbergh's go-between for the delivery of the ransom money, who testified that he had met Hauptmann and given the money to him.

After Wilentz's effective presentation of evidence, the jury returned a guilty verdict and Hauptmann was sentenced to death. His appeals were rejected, despite a temporary reprieve from Governor Harold G. Hoffman, who ordered the New Jersey Board of Pardons to review the case. Hauptmann was electrocuted on April 3, 1936.

The conviction was questioned many times in subsequent years, but Wilentz never wavered in his assertion that Hauptmann was guilty. In 1981 Hauptmann's widow, Anna, unsuccessfully sought to overturn the guilty verdict, requesting $100 million in damages from Wilentz and the state, claiming false prosecution. At the time, Robert Wilentz, David's son, was Chief Justice of the New Jersey Supreme Court, though Anna Hauptmann's appeal was made in Federal District Court.

== Later career ==
After the Lindbergh trial, Wilentz leveraged his fame to exert greater control within the state Democratic Party. In the 1940s his Middlesex County Democratic organization rivaled the Hudson County machine of Frank Hague. After John V. Kenny defeated Hague in the Jersey City mayoral election of 1949, Wilentz consolidated his power, joining with Kenny in founding the National Democratic Club of New Jersey to combat Hague's influence.

In the 1950s, Wilentz grew increasingly influential behind the scenes as a confidante of Democratic governors and one of a small number of kingmakers who selected Democratic nominees for statewide office. As a member of the Democratic National Committee he was a powerful voice in the selection of candidates for president and vice-president.

Wilentz maintained a private practice with Wilentz, Goldman & Spitzer, the firm he founded in Perth Amboy in 1950. His sons, Warren and Robert, joined him in the family firm. Robert Wilentz remained a member until 1979, when he was appointed Chief Justice of the New Jersey Supreme Court. Warren W. Wilentz was the Democratic candidate for United States Senate in 1966, losing to the incumbent Clifford P. Case. David Wilentz's daughter Norma married Leon Hess, founder of the Hess Corporation and owner of the New York Jets. Norma and Leon's daughter, Constance H. Williams, served as a state representative and state senator in Pennsylvania.

In 1988 Wilentz died at his home in Long Branch, New Jersey at the age of 93.

== See also ==
- List of Jewish American jurists

Legal offices
Preceded by William A. Stevens	Attorney General of New Jersey; 1934 – 1944	Succeeded by Walter D. Van Riper
