= Elden Mills =

American politician (1908–1965)

Member of the New Jersey General Assembly from the Morris district
- In office 1948–1958
- Preceded by: Multi-member district
- Succeeded by: Multi-member district

Personal details
- Born: June 24, 1908 Morristown, New Jersey, U.S.
- Died: May 9, 1965 (aged 56) Philadelphia, Pennsylvania, U.S.
- Party: Republican

Elden Mills (June 24, 1908 – May 9, 1965) was an American politician who served in the New Jersey General Assembly from the Morris district from 1948 to 1958. He served as Speaker of the New Jersey General Assembly in 1957.
