= New Jersey Attorney General =

Member of the New Jersey executive cabinet

State of New Jersey Office of the Attorney General

Agency overview
- Jurisdiction: New Jersey
- Headquarters: Richard J. Hughes Justice Complex, 25 Market Street, Trenton, New Jersey
- Agency executive: Jennifer Davenport, Attorney General
- Parent agency: State of New Jersey
- Website: Official website

The attorney general of New Jersey is a member of the executive cabinet of the state and oversees the Department of Law and Public Safety. The office is appointed by the governor of New Jersey, confirmed by the New Jersey Senate, and term limited. Under the provisions of the New Jersey State Constitution, the Attorney General serves a concurrent term to the governor (starting on the third Tuesday of January following the election and ending on the third Tuesday following the next election). Matt Platkin became the acting officeholder on February 14, 2022, following his nomination by Governor Phil Murphy.

The conventional wisdom is that the attorney general cannot be removed from office except "for cause" by the governor or by way of legislative impeachment.

It is fourth in the line of succession after the lieutenant governor of New Jersey, president of the New Jersey Senate, and speaker of the New Jersey General Assembly. The attorney general cannot also serve as the lieutenant governor.

== List of office holders ==
Holders of the office of attorney general include:

=== Colonial period ===
Term of office	Attorney General	Notes and references
1704 –1714	Alexander Griffith	Alexander Griffith was the first Colonial New Jersey Attorney General.
1714 –1719	Thomas Burnett Gordon	(17 April 1652—April 28, 1722) was a Scottish emigrant to the Thirteen Colonies who became Chief Justice of the New Jersey Supreme Court and New Jersey Attorney General for the Province of New Jersey.
1719 –1723	Jeremiah Basse	(died 1725) was a governor of both West Jersey and East Jersey. He became governor of West Jersey in 1697, and became governor of East Jersey in 1697.
1723 –1728	James Alexander	(May 27, 1691 – April 2, 1756) was a lawyer and statesman in colonial New York. He served in the Colonial Assembly and as attorney general of the colony in 1721 –23. His son William was later a major general in the Continental Army during the American revolution. Alexandria Township, New Jersey was named after James Alexander.
1728 –1733	Lawrence Smyth	
1733 –1754	Joseph Warrell	
1754 –1776	Cortlandt Skinner	(December 16, 1727 – March 15, 1799) was the last colonial attorney general of New Jersey and a brigadier general in the British Loyalist force, the New Jersey Volunteers during the American Revolutionary War.

=== Post-independence ===
#	Picture	Attorney General	Term in office	Party affiliation	Appointed by
1		William Paterson(1745–1806)	1776 – 1783	Federalist	Elected by the legislature
2		Joseph Bloomfield (1753–1823)	1783 – 1792	Anti-Administration	Elected by the legislature
3		Aaron Woodruff	1792 – 1811	Federalist	Elected by the legislature
4		Andrew S. Hunter	1811	Democratic-Republican	Elected by the legislature
5		Aaron Woodruff	1812 – June 26, 1817	Federalist	Elected by the legislature
6		Theodore Frelinghuysen	November 1, 1817 – March 4, 1829	Federalist	Elected by the legislature
7		Samuel L. Southard	1829 – 1833	National Republican	Elected by the legislature
8		John Moore White	1833 – 1838	[data missing]	Elected by the legislature
9		Richard Stockton Field	1838 – 1841	Republican	Elected by the legislature
10		George P. Mollesson	1841 – 1844	[data missing]	Elected by the legislature
11		Richard P. Thompson	1844 – 1845	[data missing]	Daniel Haines
12		Abraham Browning	1845 – 1850	Democratic	Daniel Haines
13		Lucius Elmer	1850 – 1852	Democratic	Daniel Haines
14		Richard P. Thompson	1852 – 1857	[data missing]	George Franklin Fort
15		William L. Dayton	1857 – 1861	Republican	William A. Newell
16		Frederick Theodore Frelinghuysen	1861 – 1867	Republican	Charles Smith Olden
17		George M. Robeson	1867 – 1870	Republican	Marcus Lawrence Ward
18		Robert Gilchrist Jr.	1870 – 1875	Democratic	Theodore Fitz Randolph
19		Joel Parker	1875	Democratic	Joseph D. Bedle
20		Jacob Vanatta	1875 – 1877	[data missing]	Joseph D. Bedle
21		John P. Stockton	April 8, 1877 – April 5, 1897	Democratic	Joseph D. Bedle
22		Samuel H. Grey	1897 – 1902	[data missing]	John W. Griggs
23		Thomas N. McCarter	1902 – 1903	Republican	Franklin Murphy
24		Robert H. McCarter	1903 – 1908	Republican	Franklin Murphy
25		Edmund Wilson Sr.	1908 – 1914	Republican	John Franklin Fort
26		John Wesley Wescott	1914 – 1919	Democratic	James F. Fielder
27		Thomas F. McCran	1919 – 1924	Republican	Walter Evans Edge
28		Edward L. Katzenbach	1924 – 1929	[data missing]	George S. Silzer
29		William A. Stevens	1929 – 1934	[data missing]	Morgan F. Larson
30		David T. Wilentz	1934 – 1944	Democratic	A. Harry Moore
31		Walter D. Van Riper	1944 – 1948	Republican	Walter Evans Edge
32		Theodore D. Parsons	February 4, 1948 – 1954	[data missing]	Alfred E. Driscoll
33		Grover C. Richman Jr.	1954 – 1958	[data missing]	Robert B. Meyner
34		David D. Furman	1958 – 1962	[data missing]	Robert B. Meyner
35		Arthur J. Sills	January 6, 1962 – 1970	[data missing]	Richard J. Hughes
36		George Francis Kugler Jr.	1970 – 1974	[data missing]	William T. Cahill
37		William F. Hyland	1974 – 1978	Democratic	Brendan Byrne
38		John J. Degnan	January 17, 1978 – March 5, 1981	Democratic	Brendan Byrne
39		James R. Zazzali	1981 – 1982	Democratic	Brendan Byrne
40		Irwin I. Kimmelman	January 19, 1982 – January 21, 1986	Republican	Thomas Kean
41		W. Cary Edwards	January 21, 1986 – January 19, 1989	Republican	Thomas Kean
42		Peter N. Perretti Jr.	February 14, 1989 – January 16, 1990	[data missing]	Thomas Kean
43		Robert Del Tufo	January 16, 1990 – August 24, 1994	Democratic	Jim Florio
44		Deborah Portiz	January 18, 1994 – July 10, 1996	Republican	Christine Todd Whitman
45		Peter Verniero	July 10, 1996 – May 15, 1999	Republican	Christine Todd Whitman
46		John Farmer Jr.	June 3, 1999 – January 15, 2002	Republican	Christine Todd Whitman
47		David Samson	January 15, 2002 – February 15, 2003	[data missing]	Jim McGreevey
48		Peter C. Harvey	February 15, 2003 – January 30, 2006	Democratic	Jim McGreevey
49		Zulima Farber	January 30, 2006 – August 31, 2006	Democratic	Jon Corzine
Acting		Anne Milgram	August 31, 2006 – September 26, 2006	Democratic	Jon Corzine
50		Stuart Rabner	September 26, 2006 – June 29, 2007	Democratic	Jon Corzine
51		Anne Milgram	June 29, 2007 – January 18, 2010	Democratic	Jon Corzine
52		Paula Dow	January 18, 2010 – January 10, 2012	Democratic	Chris Christie
53		Jeffrey S. Chiesa	January 10, 2012 – June 6, 2013	Republican	Chris Christie
Acting		John Jay Hoffman	June 10, 2013 – March 14, 2016	Republican	Chris Christie
Acting		Robert Lougy	March 14, 2016 – June 21, 2016	[data missing]	Chris Christie
54		Christopher Porrino	June 21, 2016 – January 16, 2018	Independent	Chris Christie
55		Gurbir Grewal	January 16, 2018 – July 19, 2021	Democratic	Phil Murphy
Acting		Andrew Bruck	July 19, 2021 – February 14, 2022	Democratic	Phil Murphy
Acting		Matt Platkin	February 14, 2022 – September 29, 2022	Democratic	Phil Murphy
56		Matt Platkin	September 29, 2022 – January 20, 2026	Democratic	Phil Murphy
Acting		Jennifer Davenport	January 20, 2026 – February 24, 2026	Democratic	Mikie Sherrill
57		Jennifer Davenport	February 24, 2026 – present	Democratic	Mikie Sherrill
