= Ronald Chen =

Professor

- Born: May 28, 1958 (age 68); Stamford, Connecticut, U.S.

Academic background
- Education: Dartmouth College (BA); Rutgers University (JD)

Academic work
- Discipline: Law
- Institutions: Rutgers School of Law–Newark

Ronald Chen (born May 28, 1958) is currently University Professor, Distinguished Professor of Law and Judge Leonard I Garth Scholar at Rutgers Law School. Until August 2018, he was co-dean of Rutgers Law School and is the former New Jersey Public Advocate.

== Life ==
Chen was born on May 28, 1958, in Stamford, Connecticut, and raised in Berkeley Heights, New Jersey, where he now resides. He attended Dartmouth College, where he was president of Phi Tau fraternity and a member of the rowing team, graduating in 1980. He then attended Rutgers Law School, where he was editor-in-chief of the Rutgers Law Review, and graduated magna cum laude in 1983. He currently serves as Chair of the New Jersey Supreme Court Advisory Committee on Professional Ethics, and as a member of the American Civil Liberties Union National Executive Committee, and was elected General Counsel of the national ACLU beginning January 2018. He has also served as secretary and a member of the board of directors of the U.S. Rowing Association, was a referee in the 1996 Summer Olympics, and serves as Chair of the Masters Commission and a member of the Council of the International Rowing Federation, the international governing body of rowing.

Until January 2010, he served as the New Jersey Public Advocate, having been nominated to fill that position on January 5, 2006, by Governor of New Jersey Jon Corzine. He was the first public advocate since 1994, when the job was abolished by former Governor Christine Todd Whitman following the two-year tenure of Zulima Farber, who was Governor James Florio's Public Advocate. The first New Jersey public advocate—and the first of any state—was Stanley Van Ness, whose office filed an Amicus Brief in the case resulting in a decision which was to become known as the Mt. Laurel Doctrine, which prevents municipalities from using zoning as a means of excluding low-income residents. Prior to becoming public advocate, Chen was an associate dean and professor of law at Rutgers Law School, teaching courses on contracts, constitutional law, and the federal courts. He returned to Rutgers after his term as public advocate and resumed an active teaching and administrative role. In April 2013, he rose from Vice-Dean to Acting Dean, due to new responsibilities assumed by Dean John Farmer. He was appointed permanent Dean in April 2015. With the merger of the Newark and Camden campuses, he became co-dean of Rutgers Law School. until 2018.
