= Jon Corzine =

American politician (born 1947)

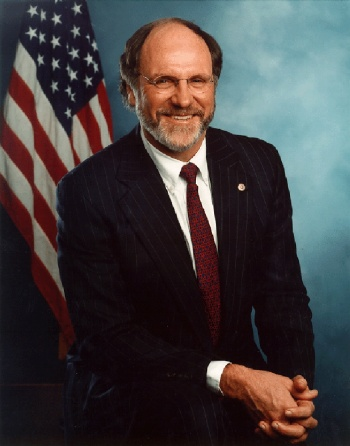

54th Governor of New Jersey
- In office January 17, 2006 – January 19, 2010
- Preceded by: Richard Codey
- Succeeded by: Chris Christie

Chair of the Democratic Senatorial Campaign Committee
- In office January 3, 2003 – January 3, 2005
- Leader: Tom Daschle
- Preceded by: Patty Murray
- Succeeded by: Chuck Schumer

United States Senator from New Jersey
- In office January 3, 2001 – January 17, 2006
- Preceded by: Frank Lautenberg
- Succeeded by: Bob Menendez

Personal details
- Born: Jon Stevens Corzine; January 1, 1947 (age 79) Taylorville, Illinois, U.S.
- Party: Democratic
- Spouses: Joanne Dougherty (m. 1969; div. 2003); Sharon Elghanayan (m. 2010)
- Children: 3
- Relatives: Roy A. Corzine (grandfather)
- Education: University of Illinois, Urbana-Champaign (BA); University of Chicago (MBA)

Military service
- Branch/service: United States Marine Corps
- Years of service: 1969–1975
- Rank: Sergeant
- Unit: United States Marine Corps Reserve

Jon Stevens Corzine (/ˈkɔːrzaɪn/ KOR-zyne; born January 1, 1947) is an American financial executive and retired politician who served as a United States senator from New Jersey from 2001 to 2006, and the 54th governor of New Jersey from 2006 to 2010. Corzine ran for a second term as governor in 2009 but was defeated for re-election by Republican Chris Christie. A member of the Democratic Party, he previously worked at Goldman Sachs; after leaving politics, he was CEO of MF Global from 2010 until its collapse in 2011.

== Education and early business career ==
Corzine was born in Taylorville, Illinois, the son of Nancy June (née Hedrick) and Roy Allen Corzine, Jr. His grandfather Roy A. Corzine, Sr. served in the Illinois General Assembly. He grew up on a small family farm in Willey Station, Illinois near Taylorville. After completing high school at Taylorville High School, where he had been the football quarterback and basketball captain, he attended the University of Illinois at Urbana–Champaign, where he was a member of the Phi Delta Theta fraternity, and graduated in 1969, earning Phi Beta Kappa honors. While in college, he enlisted in the United States Marine Corps Reserve and served from 1969 until 1975, attaining the rank of sergeant. In 1970, he enrolled in the University of Chicago Booth School of Business, from which he received a Master of Business Administration degree in 1973.

His first business experience was in the bond department of Continental Illinois National Bank, where he worked days while attending the Booth School of Business MBA program at night. He then moved to BancOhio National Bank, a regional bank in Columbus, Ohio, that was acquired in 1984 by National City Bank. Corzine worked at BancOhio until 1975, when he moved his family to New Jersey and was hired as a bond trader for Goldman Sachs.

== Goldman Sachs ==
In 1976, Corzine joined Goldman Sachs as a bond trader and then became co-manager of the Fixed Income, Currencies and Commodities Division. He became a partner in 1980, and a member of the management committee in 1984. He served as Goldman Sachs' CFO (1991–1994), CEO (1994-1998) and a senior partner (1994–1999). During his leadership, Corzine oversaw the firm's expansion into Asia and was instrumental in leading the transition of the firm from a private partnership to a public company.

Corzine also chaired a presidential commission on capital budgeting for Bill Clinton and served as Chairman of the United States Department of the Treasury's borrowing committee. As the Goldman Sachs senior partner, he helped develop a private sector plan to rescue the hedge fund Long-Term Capital Management when the leveraged fund's collapse in the fall of 1998 threatened contagion across the U.S. financial system. According to U.S. News & World Report, Corzine did not get along with co-CEO Henry Paulson, who came from the other major area of the bank, investment banking. When Corzine participated in structuring the bailout, Paulson seized control of the firm. When Goldman Sachs went public after Corzine's departure, Corzine made $400 million.

Corzine has participated in meetings of the Bilderberg Group, a network of leaders in the fields of politics, business and banking (1995–1997, 1999, 2003, and 2004). He is a former member of the group's steering committee.

Corzine is a member of Kappa Beta Phi.

== U.S. Senate ==
=== 2000 election ===
After being forced out from Goldman Sachs in January 1999, Corzine launched a campaign for the New Jersey U.S. Senate seat being vacated by the retiring Frank Lautenberg. Despite initially trailing behind his opponent, former governor James Florio, in the Democratic primary by 30 percentage points, Corzine won the nomination by 16 points. He later attributed his successful primary run to pollster Bob Shrum who convinced him to run not as "a seasoned investment banker and job creator" but as a "liberal progressive". In the general election, Corzine won by just a three-point margin over his Republican opponent, four-term United States Congressman Bob Franks, in the November 2000 election. He was sworn into the Senate in January 2001.

He spent more than $62 million of his own money on his campaign, the most expensive Senate campaign in U.S. history – over $33 million of this was spent on the primary election alone, where he defeated former Governor James Florio 58–42%. Franks had been a last-minute choice because New Jersey Governor Christine Todd Whitman had been expected to run for the Senate. The record $62 million amount surpassed Michael Huffington, who spent nearly $28 million in an unsuccessful 1994 Senate race.

During the campaign, Corzine refused to release his income tax return records. He claimed an interest in doing so, but he cited a confidentiality agreement with Goldman Sachs. Skeptics argued that Corzine should have followed the example of his predecessor Robert Rubin, who converted his equity stake into debt upon leaving Goldman.

Corzine campaigned for state government programs including universal health care, universal gun registration, mandatory public preschool, and more taxpayer funding for college education. He pushed affirmative action and same-sex marriage. David Brooks opined that Corzine was so liberal that his election, although the fact that his predecessor was also a Democrat, helped push the Senate to the left.

During Corzine's campaign for the United States Senate, he made some controversial off-color statements. When introduced to a man with an Italian name who said he was in the construction business, Corzine quipped: "Oh, you make cement shoes!" according to Emanuel Alfano, chairman of the Italian-American One Voice Committee. Alfano reported that when introduced to a lawyer named David Stein, Corzine said: "He's not Italian, is he? Oh, I guess he's your Jewish lawyer who is here to get the rest of you out of jail." Corzine denied mentioning religion, but did not deny the quip about Italians, stating that some of his own ancestors were probably Italian, or maybe French.

Also in 2000, Corzine denied having made payments to African-American ministers, although the foundation controlled by Jon and Joanne Corzine had paid one influential black church $25,000. Reginald T. Jackson, director of the Black Ministers Council of New Jersey, had campaigned against a form of racial profiling whereby police officers stop minority drivers, and had gotten New Jersey state police superintendent Carl A. Williams fired. Corzine had donated to Jackson prior to getting what appears to be a reciprocal endorsement.

=== Tenure ===
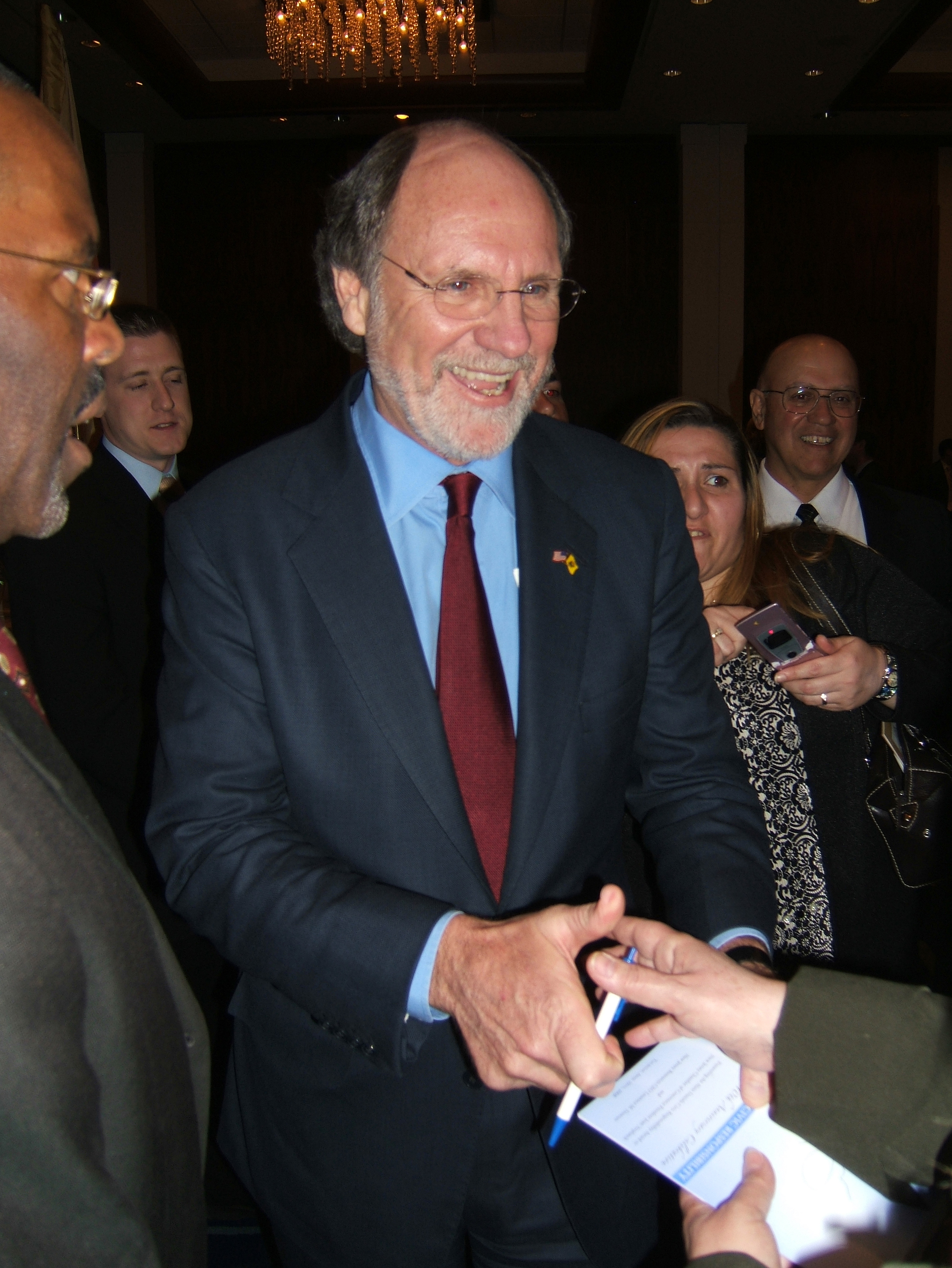
Corzine in New Brunswick, New Jersey, in 2008

Corzine entered Congress in a class of 10 new senators, eight of whom were Democrats. According to U.S. News & World Report, Corzine, Hillary Clinton and Jean Carnahan were the more notable new senators in 2000. During his five-year senatorial career, he was present at 1,503 of 1,673 votes, cosponsored 1,014 bills, sponsored 145 bills (only 11 of which made it out of committee), and had one sponsored bill enacted.

He co-authored the Sarbanes–Oxley Act. In the aftermath of Enron, he cosponsored (with Barbara Boxer) legislation, which was later propounded by Ted Kennedy, that reforms the 401(k) plan to minimize the risk of investment portfolios. The plan was opposed by President George W. Bush and faced strong opposition in Congress. Restrictions on retirement account allocations were in direct opposition to the contemporaneous movement towards self-directed individual retirement accounts for Social Security.

Corzine was a sponsor of the Start Healthy, Stay Healthy Act. He supported providing a two-year tax break to victims of the September 11, 2001 attacks and help grant citizenship to victims who were legal resident aliens. He supported gun control laws, outlawing racial profiling, and subsidies for Amtrak. He was the chief sponsor, along with U.S. Senator Sam Brownback, of the Darfur Accountability Act. He was one of 23 Senators to vote against the Iraq War Resolution. Corzine was the prime sponsor, along with fellow New Jersey U.S. Senator Frank Lautenberg, of a federal version of John's Law, in memory of Navy Ensign John R. Elliott (a native of New Jersey), a U.S. Naval Academy graduate who was killed by a drunk driver. The legislation provides federal highway safety grant incentives to encourage states to impound the cars of DUI suspects. He was an early contributing blogger at The Huffington Post.

In the aftermath of the September 11, 2001, attacks, Corzine and Peter Fitzgerald attempted to mold a more disciplined bailout of the airline industry, but even the redesigned plan was not entirely satisfactory to Corzine. Corzine opposed the reduction in low-income student eligibility for Pell Grant funding caused by changes in the "expected family contribution".

Corzine tried and failed to introduce legislation for chemical plant regulation six weeks after the September 11, 2001 attacks. Subsequent efforts by then-Administrator of the Environmental Protection Agency and former New Jersey Governor Christine Todd Whitman in 2002 were also squelched. Along with Hillary Clinton, he was one of the few senators who attempted to pressure the Bush administration to clamp down on regulation of the chemical and nuclear-power industries. His efforts helped make New Jersey one of the stricter states in the nation in terms of chemical plant regulation.

In 2001, Corzine coauthored (with Bob Graham) a tax-cut proposal aimed at lowering the marginal tax bracket from 15% to 10% on the first $19,000 of taxable income. In 2002, he proposed a tax cut that exempted the first $10,000 of income from the $765 of Social Security taxes for both employers and employees. Corzine also proposed making dividend payments tax deductible to companies as a form of economic stimulus.

While in the Senate, he chaired the Democratic Senatorial Campaign Committee from 2003 to 2005. In this role he was influential in convincing certain potential candidates to not run in order to avoid costly primaries in three key states during the 2004 United States Senate elections. He also played a role in the selection of Senator John Edwards as a running mate for Senator John Kerry. In 2002, Corzine called for the resignation of United States Securities and Exchange Commission Chairman Harvey Pitt.

=== Committee assignments ===
In the Senate, Corzine was a member of the Committees on Banking, Intelligence, the Budget, Foreign Relations, Environment, and Energy and Natural Resources.

== Campaigns for New Jersey Governor ==
=== 2005 ===
Corzine and his opponent, Republican Doug Forrester, spent $73 million on their gubernatorial campaigns by the week before election day. This included $38 million by Corzine and $19 million by Forrester for the general election. The primaries accounted for the difference. Since Corzine had spent over $62 million on his 2000 United States Senate elections, the combined expenditures for Corzine's run for the Senate and governorship exceeded $100 million. The main campaign issues were property taxes and the Bush administration. New Jersey had averaged $5,500 in 2004 property taxes, and Corzine tried to link his opponent to Bush.

The campaign for the post of Governor of New Jersey was successful with 54% of the vote. Forrester, a businessman and a former Mayor of West Windsor Township, in Mercer County, won 43%. Corzine received 1,224,493 votes to Forrester's 985,235. A total of 80,277 votes, or 3%, were scattered among other candidates. Corzine won 13 of New Jersey's 21 counties: Atlantic, Bergen, Burlington, Camden, Cumberland, Essex, Gloucester, Hudson, Mercer, Middlesex, Passaic, Salem, and Union. Corzine won the three most populous counties (Bergen, Essex, and Middlesex), five of the top six, and seven of the top nine.

=== 2009 ===
Corzine ran for re-election in the 2009 New Jersey gubernatorial election. In January 2009, Rasmussen Reports indicated that recently announced Republican challenger Chris Christie led Corzine 42% to 40%. Other polls that month showed Corzine with approvals of 46% to 40%, but these were trailing his "favorables", which were just 42–44%. By June and July, a number of polls showed Corzine trailing the Republican nominee, Christie, by double digits, though the tide changed again and by October polls showed Corzine was close, and in some cases, ahead. In the end, Corzine lost the race to Christie by a margin of 48.5% to 44.9%, with 5.8% of the vote going to independent candidate Chris Daggett.

== Governor of New Jersey ==
The Corzine Cabinet
Office	Name	Term
Governor	Jon Corzine	2006–2010
Adjutant General	Maj. Gen. Glenn K. Rieth	2006–2010
Secretary of Agriculture	Charles M. Kuperus	2006–2009
Douglas H. Fisher	2009–2010
Attorney General	Zulima V. Farber	2006–2006
Stuart Rabner	2006–2007
Anne Milgram	2007–2010
Commissioner of Banking and Insurance	Steven M. Goldman	2006–2009
Neil Jasey*	2009–2010
Commissioner of Children and Families	Kevin Ryan	2006–2008
Kimberly Ricketts	2008–2010
Commissioner of Community Affairs	Susan Bass Levin	2006–2007
Joseph V. Doria, Jr.	2007–2009
Charles A. Richman*	2009–2010
Commissioner of Corrections	George W. Hayman	2006–2010
Commissioner of Education	Lucille Davy	2006–2010
Commissioner of Environmental Protection	Lisa P. Jackson	2006–2008
Mark N. Mauriello	2008–2010
Commissioner of Health and Senior Services	Fred M. Jacobs	2006–2008
Heather Howard	2008–2010
Commissioner of Human Services	Clarke Bruno	2006–2007
Jennifer Velez	2007–2010
Commissioner of Labor and Workforce; Development	David J. Socolow	2006–2010
Public Advocate	Ronald Chen	2006–2010
Secretary of State	Nina Mitchell Wells	2006–2010
Commissioner of Transportation	Kris Kolluri	2006–2008
Stephen Dilts	2008–2010
State Treasurer	Bradley Abelow	2006–2007
Michellene Davis*	2007–2008
R. David Rousseau	2008–2010
Chair/Chief Executive Officer of the Civil Service Commission	Hope L. Cooper*	2008–2010
Chief of the Office of Economic Growth	Gary D. Rose	2006–2008
Jerold L. Zaro	2008–2010
Director of the Office of Homeland; Security and Preparedness	Richard L. Cañas	2006–2010
Chair/Chief Administrator of the Motor Vehicle Commission	Sharon Anne Harrington	2006–2009
Shawn B. Sheekey*	2009–2010
President of the Board of Public Utilities	Jeanne Fox	2006–2010
Superintendent of the State Police	Col. Joseph R. Fuentes	2006–2010
- * Acting officeholder only.

Corzine officially declined his $175,000 salary in 2006.

After taking office in January 2006, Corzine's approval numbers were very low. Many polls seemed to indicate that much of this negative polling was a result of the protracted budget battle ahead of the 2006 New Jersey State Government shutdown in July. An April 26, 2006, poll from Quinnipiac University Polling Institute showed Corzine at a 35% approval with a 42% disapproval. A February 28, 2007, poll from Quinnipiac University showed Corzine at 50% approval with 34% disapproval. When Corzine released a controversial plan to monetize the New Jersey Turnpike and the Garden State Parkway, his approval rating fell to 30% in January 2008.

In conjunction with this fall in approval rating, an initiative to recall the Governor was started for the first and only time ever in New Jersey history. The recall effort failed after gathering less than the required 1.2 million signatures.

Corzine had long insisted that state employees must bear part of the cost of their health benefits after retirement. As of July 1, 2007, in agreements with the Communications Workers of America, the American Federation of State, County, and Municipal Employees, and the International Federation of Professional and Technical Engineers, active State employees in those unions (as well as certain other non-union employees) are now required to contribute 1.5% of their salary to offset health care costs. State and local employees' contributions to the two largest pension systems increased by 10%, from 5% to 5.5% of their annual salaries and increased the retirement benefit age for new public employees, from 55 to 60 years. In 2008, Corzine approved a law that increased the retirement age from 60 to 62, required that government workers and teachers earn $7,500 per year to qualify for a pension, eliminated Lincoln's Birthday as a state worker holiday, allowed the state to offer incentives not to take health insurance and required municipal employees work 20 hours per week to get health benefits.

As part of his attempt to balance the budget, Corzine decreased funding to most programs and localities including state universities and colleges. The first of these decreases came with the 2007 budget. Rutgers University and other New Jersey state universities raised tuition, cut hundreds of sections of classes, and several sports teams. With the latest decrease in funding for 2009, most state institutions have less funding than they had a decade ago. Despite the $15 million in cuts, Rutgers went ahead with previous agreed upon raises of $15 million to their executive faculty. This resulted in Rutgers making $30 million in cuts.

Corzine has been the only New Jersey governor in recent memory to make any headway in addressing the crisis of municipal funding. While not directly touching the third rail of New Jersey governance – property taxes – Corzine's reform of the school funding formula (passed and signed in January 2008) resulted in significant relief to many New Jersey towns with outsize school costs but limited tax base. The plan survived a legal challenge and was declared constitutional by the New Jersey Supreme Court on May 28, 2009.

Corzine championed expanding government health and education programs. He planned to require every resident to enroll in a health plan and have taxpayers help pick up the tab for all the welfare low- and middle-income residents. In June 2008, state legislators voted for the first phase of that program mandating health care coverage and Corzine signed it into law in July.

Corzine spent some $200,000 of public funds on advertisements to promote a referendum on the 2007 New Jersey ballot to borrow $450 million to fund stem cell research. The referendum faced strong opposition and was rejected despite the fact that $270 million had previously been approved to build stem cell research centers.

Corzine, a death penalty opponent, as governor supported and presided over abolition of capital punishment in New Jersey and replacing it with life imprisonment. After the legislature passed and he signed it into law, New Jersey became the first state to legislatively eliminate capital punishment since 1965. Although the bill was not passed until late in 2007, New Jersey had not executed any criminals since 1963. Because the penalty was never used and often reversed upon appeal, it was viewed as a form of extended suffering for victims' families by some supporters of its abolition. Before the enactment of the new law, he commuted the death sentences of all death row inmates to life in prison. Corzine also has supported early New Jersey efforts at gun control.

Corzine was one of several United States Governors – including Martin O'Malley of Maryland, Mike Beebe of Arkansas, and Eliot Spitzer of New York – who were early supporters of Hillary Clinton's 2008 presidential campaign. He raised $1 million for her campaign. He, Bill Clinton, Eliot Spitzer, Chuck Schumer, and Charlie Rangel co-hosted Clinton's October 25, 2007 60th-birthday party. He remained a committed Clinton superdelegate late into the 2008 Democratic Party presidential primary season. If the Democratic National Committee had decided to recontest the Michigan and Florida primaries, Corzine and Ed Rendell were prepared to spearhead Clinton's fundraising in for those races. Towards the end of the primary season in April 2008, Corzine made it clear that although he was a Clinton supporter, his superdelegate vote would be determined by the popular vote. After her win in the April 22, 2008 Pennsylvania Democratic primary and a calculation of popular votes that excluded caucuses and included the controversial Michigan and Florida Democratic primaries, Corzine reaffirmed his support for her. Once Barack Obama became the presumptive nominee, Corzine became a prominent spokesperson for Obama's agenda.

Corzine was among a group of big (in terms of population) state governors, such as Republican Arnold Schwarzenegger, who moved his state Republican and Democratic primaries to February 5, 2008, the date of Super Tuesday, 2008. He was also among a group of prominent Democratic politicians (that included Ted Kennedy and Barack Obama) who received political contributions from Norman Hsu that he ended up donating to charity.

In November 2008, in response to the ongoing economic downturn, Corzine proposed an economic recovery package consisting of additional massive spending, accelerated capital improvement spending and reforms and cuts to the corporate income tax. As of December 2008 many elements of the plan had been approved by the Democrats in the NJ Legislature. On January 2, 2009, Corzine joined the governors of four other states in urging the federal government to provide $1 trillion in aid to the country's 50 state governments to help pay for education, welfare and infrastructure as states struggle with steep budget deficits amid a deepening recession.

=== Government shutdown ===
Corzine, in attempting to pass the 2007 fiscal year budget, clashed with a few fellow state Democrats in the New Jersey General Assembly, particularly over the proposed increase of the state's sales tax from 6% to 7%. Corzine said that he would not accept a budget that did not include the sales tax increase. After the legislature failed to pass Corzine's budget by the midnight deadline of July 1, 2006, he signed an executive order that immediately closed down all non-essential state government services, such as road construction projects. Legislators failed to resolve the situation by July 4 and casinos, among other governmentally-regulated industries, closed their doors at 8:00 am on July 5. Corzine called the shutdown "deplorable", though he refused to negotiate with legislators and accept alternate plans that did not increase the sales tax. Some surmised the casino closure was an effort to encourage reluctant South Jersey legislators to break the impasse.

After six days of state government shutdown, Corzine and Assembly Democrats agreed to raise the state sales tax to 7% with half of the 1% increase going to the state budget and the other half going to property tax relief. On July 8, 2006, the $30 billion state budget, with the sales tax agreement, passed both houses and Governor Corzine signed the budget into law ending the budget impasse.

=== Toll hike plan ===
Initially, Corzine opposed privatization of the New Jersey Turnpike. On January 8, 2008, to address ongoing structural budget issues, Governor Corzine proposed a four-part proposal including an overall reduction in spending, a constitutional amendment to require more voter approval for state borrowing, an executive order prohibiting the use of one-time revenues to balance the budget and a controversial plan to raise some $38 billion by leasing the Garden State Parkway, the New Jersey Turnpike, and other toll roads for at least 75 years to a new public benefit corporation that could sell bonds secured by future tolls, which it would be allowed to raise by 50% plus inflation every four years beginning in 2010. Corzine vowed to get that plan through the state legislature by March, but held off for nearly a month before releasing the details. Upon learning how the plan would work, New Jersey native residents railed against it, comparing it to using one credit card to pay off another, pointing out that it would create hardship for commuters and noting that it would actually increase the state's $32 billion debt. Corzine later wrote that only after the proposal was released did he discover "the harsh reality: the public intensely disliked the idea" and that, in retrospect, he "should have pressed harder to identify the most salient arguments against the plan and developed a strategy to get in front of and respond to those challenges".

=== Carla Katz ===
Corzine, who was running for the United States Senate in the spring of 1999, met Carla Katz, the then-married president of Local 1034 of the Communications Workers of America (CWA), in the same apartment building where he resided in Hoboken; the CWA represents the largest number of state workers in New Jersey. As Katz later recalled, Corzine offered her a job on his Senate campaign, but she declined the offer. Corzine and the still-married Katz were soon dating, and they began appearing in public as a couple in early 2002, shortly after Corzine's unofficial separation from his wife, Joanne. (The Corzines divorced the following year.) For more than two years Corzine was romantically involved and living with Katz. She lived with him at his apartment building in Hoboken from April 2002 until August 2004.

After Corzine's breakup with Katz, their lawyers negotiated a financial payout in November 2004. According to press accounts, the settlement for Katz exceeded $6 million, including cash (in part used to buy her $1.1 million condominium in Hoboken), a college trust fund to educate her children, a 2005 Volvo sport utility vehicle, and Corzine forgave a $470,000 loan he had made to Katz in 2002 to buy out her ex-husband's share of their home in Alexandria Township. Katz enrolled in Seton Hall University School of Law on a full scholarship in 2004. Corzine later acknowledged he had given $15,000 to Katz's brother-in-law, Rocco Riccio, a former state employee who was forced to resign after being accused of examining income tax returns for political purposes. At the time, Katz was president of the CWA Local 1034, which bargains on behalf of many state employees.

In the summer of 2005, when Corzine was running in the New Jersey gubernatorial election, news first emerged of his relationship with Katz and the money she had received. Corzine was elected governor despite the scandal. In the fall of 2006, during an impasse in contract negotiations between the Corzine administration and the state's seven major state employee unions (including the CWA), Katz contacted the governor by phone and e-mail to lobby for a renewal of the negotiations. Their relationship and the financial settlement Katz received after their breakup led to allegations of many potential conflicts of interest in labor negotiations while Corzine was governor. A state ethics panel, acting on a complaint from Bogota mayor Steve Lonegan, ruled in May 2007 that Katz's contact with Corzine during negotiations did not violate the governor's code of conduct.

Separately, New Jersey Republican State Committee Chairman Tom Wilson filed a lawsuit to release all e-mail correspondence between Corzine and Katz during the contract negotiations. On May 30, 2008, New Jersey Superior Court Judge Paul Innes ruled that at least 745 pages of e-mail records should be made public, but Corzine's lawyers immediately appealed the decision and the appellate court overturned the trial court ruling. Wilson then filed an appeal to the New Jersey Supreme Court, asking the Supreme Court to reinstate the trial court ruling.

Corzine won his case on appeal. On March 18, 2009, the New Jersey Supreme Court ruled it would not hear arguments in the case, effectively ending the legal battle to make his e-mails with Katz public. Corzine spent approximately $127,000 of taxpayer funds to keep the e-mails secret. Nonetheless, on August 1, 2010, The Star-Ledger published 123 of the Corzine-Katz e-mails, revealing the extent of their personal contact during negotiations over a new state government workers contract in early 2007.

=== Appointments ===
Corzine continued to serve in the U.S. Senate while running for governor, which ensured that he could resign from the Senate and appoint a Democrat as his successor if he won and allowed him to retain his Senate seat if he lost. Speculation was that he would appoint a Democrat from one of the congressional districts in New Jersey, perhaps Congressmen Rob Andrews, Rush Holt, or Frank Pallone. Corzine, once he was Governor-Elect, said on November 11, 2005, that he was strongly considering appointing State Senator Nia Gill to fill his vacant seat in the United States Senate. Corzine said about Gill that she was "an extraordinarily capable woman". Gill for her part told the Associated Press "I have the qualifications. If I am chosen by Jon, I am more than qualified to rise to the occasion." He strongly hinted he might appoint Governor Richard Codey although on November 23, 2005, Codey announced that he was not interested in pursuing the seat. On December 9, 2005, Corzine named his friend, who lived and lives in the same apartment building, U.S. Rep. Robert Menendez, a Democrat, to succeed him.

One of Corzine's first nominations was that of Zulima Farber as New Jersey Attorney General. She served for approximately seven months until an ethics investigation concluded that she had acted improperly by going to the location where local police in Fairview, New Jersey had stopped her boyfriend, Hamlet Gore, for driving with a suspended license and an expired vehicle registration. Corzine said he did not ask for Farber's resignation.

On February 9, 2006, after many scandals regarding financial mishandling at the University of Medicine and Dentistry of New Jersey, Corzine nominated Robert Del Tufo, the former Attorney General of New Jersey and U.S. Attorney, as chairman of the board of trustees. Corzine also nominated Oliver Quinn, Prudential Financial's vice president and chief ethics officer, as vice chairman of the board.

Corzine's commissioner of the Department of Environmental Protection and Chief of Staff, Lisa P. Jackson was nominated as the administrator of the United States Environmental Protection Agency. She was confirmed by the Senate on January 22, 2009.

=== Motorcade accident ===
On April 12, 2007, Corzine and 25-year-old aide Samantha Gordon were injured in an automobile accident on the Garden State Parkway near Galloway Township while traveling from the New Jersey Conference of Mayors in Atlantic City to Drumthwacket, his residence in Princeton, to meet with radio personality Don Imus and the Rutgers University women's basketball team.

The New Jersey State Police determined that Corzine's SUV, driven by a state trooper, was traveling in excess of 90 miles per hour (140 km/h) with its emergency lights flashing when the collision occurred. A pickup truck drifted onto the shoulder and swerved back onto the lane, and another pickup truck swerved to avoid the truck and hit the Governor's SUV, causing the SUV to hit the guardrail. The State Police reviewed roadside camera recordings and E-ZPass records to track down the driver of the truck; he was not charged with any violation.

Corzine and the trooper were flown by helicopter to Cooper University Hospital in Camden, a Level I trauma center. The aide was taken by ambulance to Atlantic City Medical Center. Neither the NJ State Trooper nor the aide was seriously injured, but Corzine suffered broken bones, including an open fracture of the left femur, 11 broken ribs, a broken sternum, a broken collarbone, a fractured lower vertebra, and a facial cut that required plastic surgery. The Governor was not wearing a seat belt. Friends had long said that they had rarely seen him wear one. When asked why the state trooper who was driving would not have asked Corzine to put on his seat belt, a staffer said the governor was "not always amenable to suggestion". The Superintendent of State Police has also noted that the trooper could be charged if the crash were preventable.

By April 23, 2007, Corzine's doctors had upgraded him from critical to stable condition. He was sedated and unable to speak because of a breathing tube in his throat, and as such, was unable to perform his duties as governor. In accordance with the New Jersey State Constitution, New Jersey Senate President Richard Codey assumed the position of acting governor for the short period from April 12 until May 7, 2007. In 2005, voters had approved an amendment to the state constitution to provide for a lieutenant governor who would succeed the governor in the event of a vacancy or assume gubernatorial duties in the event of incapacitation, but that position would not be filled until 2010.

Corzine left the hospital on April 30, 2007. He returned to Drumthwacket, where he recuperated and used a videoconferencing center (installed at his expense) to communicate with legislators. He issued an apology, paid a $46 ticket for not wearing a seat belt, and he appeared in a public service announcement advocating seat belts, which opened with the words "I'm New Jersey Governor Jon Corzine, and I should be dead."

It was reported that Corzine, not taxpayers, would pay his medical bills.

=== Public opinion ===
Corzine Approvals

During the first months of his administration, Corzine experienced favorable approval ratings. According to a March 2006 Fairleigh Dickinson PublicMind Poll, 47% of New Jersey voters approved of the job Corzine was doing, while 16% disapproved. Peter Woolley, director of the PublicMind, noted, "the numbers are pretty good for a New Jersey governor heading full tilt into an unprecedented budget crisis." Much of the good will that was indicated by the March poll was quickly diminished, and in April 2006, a PublicMind poll showed that Corzine's approval rating had eroded to 39% while his disapproval rating increased to 36%. By July 2006, the Governor's ratings recovered to some extent from the April decline and in September of the same year it was clear that Corzine's approvals had not suffered from the summer conflict over the budget and the sales tax hike; 51% of New Jersey voters approved of the governor's handling of his job while 31% disapproved. His PublicMind poll ratings remained relatively stable and healthy through the rest of 2006 and 2007 with his average approvals at 54% and his average disapprovals at 29%.

In January 2008, prior to the State of the State address Corzine was at 48% approving 32% disapproving, according to the PublicMind poll. But another FDU PublicMind poll taken in late January, after the State of the State address, showed that governor's ratings were slipping; 41% of voters approved of the job Corzine was doing while 39% reported that they disapproved. The decline was largely in response to the governor's plan to raise tolls on the New Jersey Turnpike and the Garden State Parkway. February 2008 was not any kinder, as a PublicMind poll indicated that his numbers continued to slip with disapprovals catching up to approvals with 42% of voters approving and 43% of voters disapproving. Woolley remarked on the decline saying, "Considering the beating he has taken on his toll plan, it's remarkable that his numbers are not a good deal worse." The governor's approval ratings showed no recovery through September 2008 with his approvals and disapprovals averaging 42% and 43% respectively. Coincident with the presidential campaign, Corzine's approval ratings saw some improvement.

In January 2009 he stood at 46% approving and 40% disapproving. Woolley asserted that the governor was faring relatively well in public opinion considering "the enormous and growing pressure on the state budget and on the governor to protect various constituencies". Come March 2009, the PublicMind Poll found, "Gov. Jon Corzine's standing with the New Jersey public is suffering along with the economy," and as a result his approvals began to slip with 40% of voters approving and 43% disapproving. His approvals continued to decline in April as he contended with the budget and the financial crisis with 40% approving and 49% disapproving. At the end of his term, in January 2010, Corzine's approvals landed at their lowest point during the administration with 33% approving and 58% disapproving.

== Philanthropy and academia ==
Corzine has been active with a number of philanthropic and civic organizations. He currently serves as a member of the Board of Directors of Covenant House and is on the board of the New Jersey Reentry Corporation. His civic work has involved serving on the boards of several organizations in the New York-New Jersey area, including the New Jersey Performing Arts Center, the New York Philharmonic, the New York Child Study Center and the NYC Partnership. In addition, Corzine has served as co-chair of the National Commission on Capital Budgeting under President Clinton, chairman of the Treasury's Government Borrowing Committee and Chairman of the Public Securities Association.

He served on the board of trustees of the University of Chicago and served as an ex-officio member of the board of trustees of Princeton University. Corzine was the J.L. Weinberg Visiting Professor of Public Policy at Princeton in 2010 and 2011. He currently is serving at Fairleigh Dickinson University as chairman of an advisory board that is working to establish a graduate school of public and global affairs. Corzine is also serving as a visiting lecturer on politics and public policy at Farleigh's Wroxton campus in the United Kingdom.

== MF Global ==
Corzine was appointed CEO and Chairman of MF Global, a multinational futures broker and bond dealer, in March 2010.

MF Global's stock price declined two-thirds in the final week of October 2011 and its credit rating was reduced making its debt high-yield debt following huge quarterly losses. On October 31, 2011, trading was halted on shares of MF Global prior to the market opening, and soon thereafter MF Global announced that it had declared Chapter 11 bankruptcy. Shortly afterwards, federal regulators began an investigation into hundreds of millions of dollars in missing customer funds. Corzine resigned as CEO on November 4, 2011, after having retained the services of defense attorney Andrew J. Levander. It was reported that Corzine declined a severance package worth $12.1 million. MF Global's collapse was one of the ten biggest bankruptcies in U.S. history.

Corzine was subpoenaed to appear before a House committee on December 8, 2011, to answer questions regarding 1.2 billion dollars of missing money from MF Global client accounts. He testified before the committee, "I simply do not know where the money is, or why the accounts have not been reconciled to date," and that given the number of money transfers in the final days of trading at MF Global, he didn't know specifics of the movement of the funds. He also denied authorizing any misuse of customer funds. In March 2012, Bloomberg reported on a memo produced by congressional investigators that quoted an internal company e-mail relating to a $175 million transfer that was a subject of their investigation. Initial media reports suggested impropriety on Corzine's part, but this was later disproved. According to The New York Times, the employee responsible for the transfer emailed Corzine stating the transfer was a "House Wire", meaning it came from the firm's own account. The instructions Corzine had given were to deal with several overdrafts at JPMorgan Chase, but never related to any specific accounts or specific transfers made. A spokesperson for Corzine responded that Corzine "never directed Ms. O'Brien or anyone else regarding which account should be used to cure the overdrafts, and he never directed that customer funds should be used for that purpose. Nor was he informed that customer funds had been used for that purpose". In fact, as The New York Times reported, Corzine had been given specific assurances that the transfer in question was proper, and that no customer funds had been used. Subsequent court filings also attest to this fact. On November 5, 2013, The New York Times reported that MF Global customers would likely recover 100 percent of their funds. A spokesman for Corzine said "Mr. Corzine is very pleased that all customers will receive a full recovery. This is a great outcome, which has been anticipated for many months." Customers have since received distributions making them whole.

In June 2013, the Commodity Futures Trading Commission (CFTC) filed civil charges against Corzine for using funds from MF's customer accounts for corporate purposes. "Corzine is charged with one count of failure to segregate and misuse of customer funds and one count of failure to supervise diligently," a news report said. The commission drew on extensive taped Corzine phone conversations in filing the complaint. Corzine's attorney Levander issued a statement contesting the charges when they were filed.

In 2013, Corzine, and managers including Bradley Abelow and Henri Steenkamp, appealed a court ruling relating to repayments to customers of the bankrupt brokerage. A spokesman for Corzine made clear that the appeal was not an attempt to delay payments to customers, but due to a disagreement regarding how those claims would be handled by the trustee after they were paid. Corzine fully supported customers receiving 100 percent of their money and had no desire for this to be delayed. There was nothing preventing the trustee from making full distributions immediately and litigating the appeal after the fact. Ultimately all customers were paid in full.

On January 5, 2017, Corzine and the CFTC agreed to a settlement order requiring Corzine to pay a $5 million penalty for his role in MF Global's collapse. Corzine also agreed to be permanently barred from working for a futures commission merchant or registering with the CFTC in any capacity.

== Electoral history ==
New Jersey U.S. Senate Election 2000
Party	Candidate	Votes	%	±%
Democratic	Jon Corzine	1,479,988	50.1	
Republican	Bob Franks	1,383,474	47.1	

New Jersey Gubernatorial Election 2005
Party	Candidate	Votes	%	±%
Democratic	Jon Corzine	1,224,551	53.5	
Republican	Doug Forrester	985,271	43.0	

New Jersey Gubernatorial Election 2009
Party	Candidate	Votes	%	±%
Republican	Chris Christie	1,174,445	48.5	
Democratic	Jon Corzine (incumbent)	1,087,731	44.9	
Independent	Chris Daggett	139,579	5.8	
Republican gain from Democratic		Swing		

== Personal life ==
Corzine married his high school sweetheart, Joanne Dougherty, in 1969 at the age of 22, and their 33-year marriage produced three children – Jennifer, Josh, and Jeffrey. The couple separated in 2002 and were divorced in November 2003. Corzine's younger son Jeffrey died by suicide on March 13, 2014 at the age of 31.

Corzine had lived with his wife in Summit, New Jersey. After their separation, Corzine moved to a condominium apartment in Hoboken.

Corzine was romantically involved with Carla Katz from April 2002 until August 2004.

In April 2010, The Huffington Post announced the engagement of Corzine and psychotherapist Sharon Elghanayan (née Levine), whom he had been dating since 2004. On November 23, 2010, Corzine married Elghanayan in a ceremony presided over by Chief Justice of the New Jersey Supreme Court Stuart Rabner, according to an announcement in The New York Times. Elghanayan is a graduate of Rutgers University and New York University.

== See also ==
- List of richest American politicians

Business positions
Preceded by Steve Friedman	Chair of Goldman Sachs; 1994–1998	Succeeded by Henry Paulson
Preceded by Steve Friedman	Chief Executive Officer of Goldman Sachs; 1994–1998	Succeeded by Henry Paulson
Preceded by Alison Carnwath	Chair of MF Global; 2010–2011	Position abolished
Preceded by Bernard Dan	Chief Executive Officer of MF Global; 2010–2011	Position abolished
Party political offices
Preceded by Frank Lautenberg	Democratic nominee for U.S. Senator from New Jersey (Class 1); 2000	Succeeded by Bob Menendez
Preceded by Patty Murray	Chair of the Democratic Senatorial Campaign Committee; 2003–2005	Succeeded by Chuck Schumer
Preceded by Jim McGreevey	Democratic nominee for Governor of New Jersey; 2005, 2009	Succeeded by Barbara Buono
U.S. Senate
Preceded by Frank Lautenberg	U.S. Senator (Class 1) from New Jersey; 2001–2006; Served alongside: Robert Torricelli, Frank Lautenberg	Succeeded by Bob Menendez
Political offices
Preceded by Richard Codey	Governor of New Jersey; 2006–2010	Succeeded by Chris Christie
U.S. order of precedence (ceremonial)
Preceded by Ted Kaufman as Former U.S. Senator	Order of precedence of the United States	Succeeded by Jeffrey Chiesa as Former U.S. Senator
