= Rubin Schron =

American real estate investor

Rubie Schron
- Born: 1938 (age 87–88)
- Occupation: Real estate investor
- Known for: Founder of Cammeby’s International Group
- Spouses: Marta Schron (- 2020) Rebbetzin Raizel Katz
- Children: Eight

Rubin "Rubie" Schron is a New York City real estate investor, philanthropist, and the founder of Cammeby's International Group. In 2013, Schron made an unsuccessful offer to buy the Empire State Building for $2 billion. In 2003, an investment group led by Schron paid $705.6 million for a portfolio of about 6,000 outer-borough apartments from Donald Trump. Schron, who practices Orthodox Judaism, has eight children and 50 grandchildren. He and his family reside in Brooklyn.

== Early life ==
Schron grew up on the Lower East Side of Manhattan in an Orthodox Jewish family. His family entered the real estate business by using the proceeds from the death of his brother in World War II to purchase a small apartment building.

== Career ==
Schron continued with the family business purchasing several buildings in the Bronx. In 1967, he founded the real estate investment company Cammeby's International Group. Typically partnering in his transactions, Schron steadily grew the business. In 2007, Cammeby's was managing over $1 billion in assets.

Significant transactions include:

- In 1998, he and partner Steve Witkoff purchased the Woolworth Building for $137.5 million.
- In 2003, he purchased 6,000 outer-borough apartments from the estate of Fred Trump.
- In 2007, he sold 4,000 Mitchell-Lama apartments for $940 million to Urban American Management and its private equity partner, City Investment Fund.
- In 2011, he sold the Lionel Hampton Houses in Harlem to real estate investor Israel Weinberger for $32.5 million.
- In 2013, he made an unsuccessful bid for the Empire State Building.
- In 2013, he purchased the Monterey, a 521-unit apartment tower, for $250 million from the Related Companies.

=== Nursing home investments ===
In 2002, Schron was advised by his friend and attorney, Leonard Grunstein, to purchase two large nursing home chains with over 18,000 patients and 183 facilities spread out over 27 states for a combined $1.4 billion. In 2003, the bankrupt Integrated Health Services (renamed SavaSeniorCare) was purchased and in 2004, Mariner Health Care was purchased. Schron financed the entire transaction. They split each company into two entities: a real estate company which would hold the real property (run by Schron); and an operating company that would run the nursing homes (run by Grunstein and a banker named Murray Foreman). The operating company would make lease payments to the real estate company.

The partnership deteriorated after Schron was told by Grunstein that he could not raise rent payments even while interest rates were rising. A lawsuit resulted and Schron countersued to exercise a $100 million option to purchase the nursing home side of the business. Schron, represented by attorney Andrew J. Levander, prevailed and in 2012, he took full control of the two nursing home companies with a combined $1.4 billion in revenues.

=== Wedding hall ===
Schron purchased and put his late wife's name on a wedding hall in Brooklyn.

== Personal life ==
Schron lives in Brooklyn. His wife Marta, with whom he had eight children, died in June 2020.
