= Andrew J. Levander =

American lawyer

- Born: 1953 (age 72–73)
- Education: Tufts University (BA); Columbia Law School (JD)
- Occupation: Chairman of Dechert
- Spouse: Carol Loewenson
- Children: 2

Andrew J. Levander (born 1953) is an American lawyer and chairman of the law firm Dechert, who advises on securities fraud, commercial litigation and white-collar criminal defense matters. A former federal prosecutor, he is known for representing numerous prominent Wall Street companies and executives, as well as global businesses facing litigation.

== Education and early career ==
Levander received his bachelor's degree summa cum laude from Tufts University in 1973. He graduated in 1977 from Columbia Law School, where he was a James Kent Scholar and the Notes and Comments Editor of the Columbia Law Review. After completing law school, he clerked for the Honorable Wilfred Feinberg of the U.S. Court of Appeals for the Second Circuit.

== Later career ==
In the late 1970s, Levander was an assistant to the Solicitor General, and made his first argument before the U.S. Supreme Court at age 25. He later served as an Assistant U.S. Attorney in the Southern District of New York's Securities and Commodities Fraud Unit.

Upon leaving the U.S. Attorney's office in 1985, Levander joined New York-based firm Shereff, Friedman, Hoffman & Goodman, where his clients included fund managers David Askin and John Kaweske, former Sunbeam Corporation chairman Paul Kazarian, Saudi arms dealer Adnan Khashoggi, and Haroon Kahlon, an associate of National Commercial Bank of Saudi Arabia chairman Sheik Khalid-Bin-Mahfouz who was implicated in the BCCI scandal. Levander continued at Shereff Friedman through that firm's 1998 merger with D.C.-based Swidler & Berlin to form Swidler Berlin Shereff Friedman until joining Dechert with a group of 64 other Swidler lawyers in 2005.

In July 2011, Levander became Chairman of Dechert, then a 900-lawyer firm.

== Notable cases ==
In 2004, with United States v. Rigas, Levander obtained acquittal of six charges and a mistrial on two charges for Michael Rigas, son of Adelphia founder John Rigas, as part of the 2002 Adelphia fraud matter.

Also in 2004, he advised Symbol Technologies in its internal investigation related to allegations of accounting fraud as well as subsequent criminal and SEC investigations and related securities class action, derivative and civil litigation.

Levander represented former Merrill Lynch CEO John Thain in a 2009 investigation by the New York Attorney General's office regarding executive bonuses paid by Merill before the closure of its sale to Bank of America. The same year, he began defending hedge fund manager J. Ezra Merkin in lawsuits brought by the New York Attorney General and investors connected to the Bernard Madoff ponzi scheme. Levander obtained a dismissal of the federal class action in September 2011 and negotiated a settlement with the Attorney General's office in 2012. He also successfully resolved numerous investor claims and in June 2018 he settled the claims with the Madoff Trustee for a net settlement payment to the Merkin funds of $280 million.

He was hired in January 2011 by Hewlett Packard's board of directors to conduct an independent investigation into the departure of CEO Mark Hurd in response to a shareholder lawsuit challenging the payment of up to $53 million in severance to Hurd despite reports that he violated the company's conduct standards. A subsequent derivative lawsuit attacking the independence and thoroughness of that investigation was summarily dismissed in September 2012.

Beginning in 2008 through 2015, Levander represented the Board of Directors of Lehman Brothers in several securities actions, ERISA class actions, and other related litigation arising from the bank's 2008 bankruptcy. He won dismissal with prejudice in the ERISA class action in October 2011 and settled the main securities class action in December of that year.

He was hired by former New Jersey governor and MF Global CEO Jon Corzine in November 2011 for advice on matters related to that company's collapse. The SEC and the DOJ agreed to close their investigations regarding Corzine in 2013. Subsequently, in 2017 the CFTC agreed to settle its claims of failure to supervise for a $5 million fine.

In 2011 and 2012, Levander obtained a series of victories on behalf of New York real estate investor Rubin Schron in a longstanding dispute regarding the ownership of nursing home operator SavaSeniorCare LLC. In May 2012, the New York State Appellate Division, First Department, upheld a previous ruling that Schron's option to acquire Sava was valid. Subsequently, in September, the New York Supreme Court, following trial, decided that Schron's company, Cammeby's Equity Holdings, could proceed in acquiring Sava through the assumption of $100 million in outstanding debt.

In July 2012, Levander began representing Barclays ex-CEO Bob Diamond amid allegations that the bank was involved in manipulating the LIBOR benchmark interest rate. No charges were brought against Diamond in those matters, and 2017 Levander convinced the UK's Serious Fraud Office to decline any charges against Diamond in connection with Barclay's financial crisis fundraising activities in Qatar. Subsequently, Levander obtained a dismissal of a class action regarding Barclays’ trading operations as to Diamond.

In 2014, Takata Corporation hired Levander to represent the company in connection with multiple congressional, regulatory and criminal investigations; class action; and other legal matters stemming from its recall of defective airbags. He negotiated a settlement with the National Highway Traffic Safety Administration (NHTSA) and then a US$1 billion settlement with the Department of Justice on the company's behalf in 2017.

In 2017, Levander began representing 21st Century Fox in connection with multiple sexual harassment claims, obtaining dismissal of claims brought by several different former employees, including Andrea Tantaros. As of 2019, he was representing Leslie Moonves, former chairman and CEO of CBS, in Moonves' attempt to have his $120 million severance restored. As of February 2020, he was representing Goldman Sachs partner Andrea Vella, who had been implicated in the Malaysian Development Bank 1MDB scandal.

In December 2020, it was reported that he was representing Washington Football Team majority owner Daniel Snyder in a dispute brought in by minority owners Dwight Schar, Fred Smith, and Robert Rothman. In March 2021, Levander concluded an investigation into the relationship between Jeffrey Epstein and Leon Black on behalf of Apollo Global Management, finding no evidence of wrongdoing on the part of Black.

== Personal life ==
Levander is married to the architect Carol Loewenson, and they live in New York City.
