= 2008 New Jersey Democratic presidential primary =

- February 5, 2008

Candidate	Hillary Clinton	Barack Obama
Home state	New York	Illinois
Delegate count	59	48
Popular vote	613,500	501,372
Percentage	53.76%	43.93%
- Primary results by county Clinton: 50–60% 60–70% Obama: 40–50% 50–60%

The 2008 New Jersey Democratic presidential primary took place February 5, 2008, also known as Super Tuesday. With 107 pledged delegates at stake, New Jersey was a significant battleground in the Democratic nomination race between Senators Hillary Clinton and Barack Obama.

Hillary Clinton won the primary amid record-breaking turnout. Her margin of victory was narrower than early polling had projected but contradicted Barack Obama’s late surge in polling and strong performance in urban areas.

== Campaign ==
Hillary Clinton was considered the frontrunner to win New Jersey's primary given her strong name recognition and institutional support in the state. She had significant endorsements from key state figures, including Governor Jon Corzine, Assembly Speaker Joseph Roberts and several county Democratic chairpersons. The vast majority of Democratic state legislators also endorsed Clinton.

Barack Obama secured endorsements from prominent local leaders, such as Newark Mayor Cory Booker and Jersey City Mayor Jerramiah Healy. These endorsements were viewed as bolstering Obama's appeal among urban and younger voters.

Sample ballot for the presidential primary.

== Polling ==
Aggregate polls

Source of poll aggregation	Dates administered	Hillary Clinton	Barack Obama	Other/Undecided (Note: Calculated by taking the difference of 100% and all other candidates combined.)	Margin
RealClearPolitics	January 30–February 4, 2008	48.3%	40.6%	11.1%	Clinton +7.7%

Poll source	Date(s) administered	Sample size	Margin of error	Joe Biden	Hillary Clinton	John Edwards	Barack Obama	Bill Richardson	Others	Undecided
Strategic Vision	September 29–October 1, 2006	<800 LV	±3.0%	1%	35%	12%	–	1%	43% (Note: Al Gore with 24%, John Kerry and Russ Feingold each with 5%, Christopher Dodd with 4%, and Wesley Clark, Ed Rendell, Tom Vilsack, Mark Warner, and Evan Bayh each with 1%)	8%
Strategic Vision	October 27–29, 2006	<800 LV	±3.0%	1%	31%	8%	14%	1%	37% (Note: Al Gore with 20%, John Kerry with 5%, Russ Feingold with 4%, Christopher Dodd with 4%, and Wesley Clark, Ed Rendell, Tom Vilsack, and Evan Bayh each with 1%)	8%
Strategic Vision	November 2–4, 2006	<800 LV	±3.0%	–	33%	9%	15%	1%	26% (Note: Al Gore with 17%, Russ Feingold with 5%, and John Kerry, Ed Rendell, Tom Vilsack, and Evan Bayh each with 1%)	9%
Quinnipiac University	January 16–22, 2007	461 RV	±4.6%	6%	30%	8%	16%	1%	22% (Note: Al Gore with 11%, John Kerry with 6%, Wesley Clark with 2%, "someone else" with 2% and "wouldn't vote" with 1%.)	17%
Quinnipiac University	February 20–25, 2007	454 RV	±4.6%	3%	41%	5%	19%	1%	16% (Note: Gore with 10%, "someone else" and "wouldn't vote" each with 2%, Clark and Dennis Kucinich each with 1%, and Chris Dodd and Tom Vilsack each with 0%.)	15%
Monmouth University/Gannett	April 11–16, 2007	451 LV	±4.6%	3%	41%	13%	22%	2%	1% (Note: Gore (voluntary response) with 1% and Dodd and Kucinich each with 0%.)	18%
Strategic Vision	April 25–27, 2007	<800 LV		5%	40%	12%	23%	2%	3% (Note: Dodd with 2% and Kucinich with 1%.)	15%
Quinnipiac University	June 26–July 2, 2007	575 RV	±4.1%	3%	46%	8%	19%	4%	3% (Note: "Other" with 2%, Dodd with 1%, and Gravel and Kucinich each with 0%.)	15%
Quinnipiac University	June 26–July 2, 2007			2%	37%	6%	15%	4%	21% (Note: Gore with 18%, "other" with 2%, Dodd with 1%, and Gravel and Kucinich each with 0%.)	13%
Strategic Vision	July 13–15, 2007	<800 LV		3%	46%	10%	20%	7%	3% (Note: Dodd with 2%, Kucinich with 1%, and Gravel with 0%.)	11%
Strategic Vision	August 24–26, 2007	<800 LV		3%	49%	8%	22%	5%	2% (Note: Kucinich and Dodd each with 1%)	11%
Quinnipiac University	September 18–23, 2007	406 RV	±4.9%	3%	46%	7%	15%	1%	13% (Note: Gore with 11%, Kucinich and "other" each with 1%, and Dodd with 0%.)	12%
Strategic Vision	September 28–30, 2007	<800 LV		2%	52%	7%	21%	5%	2% (Note: Dodd and Kucinich each with 1%.)	11%
Monmouth University/Gannett	September 27–30, 2007	478 LV	±4.5%	2%	42%	7%	23%	1%	3% (Note: Kucinich with 2%, Gore with 1%, and Dodd and Gravel each with 0%.)	21%
Quinnipiac University	October 9–15, 2007	343 RV	±5.3%	2%	46%	9%	20%	3%	4% (Note: Kucinich with 2%, Dodd and "other" each with 1%, and Gravel with 0%.)	14%
Quinnipiac University	December 5–9, 2007	387 RV	±5.0%	3%	51%	7%	17%	1%	5% (Note: Kucinich and "other" each with 2%, Gravel with 1%, and Dodd with 0%.)	12%
Monmouth/Gannett	January 9–13, 2008	475 LV	±4.5%	–	42%	9%	30%	–	3% (Note: Kucinich with 2% and "other" with 1%.)	17%
Quinnipiac University	January 15–22, 2008	464	±4.6%	–	49%	10%	32%	–	2% (Note: Kucinich and "other" each with 1%.)	7%
Survey USA	January 30–31, 2008	642	±3.9%	–	51%	–	39%	–	10%	
Greenberg Quinlan Rosner	January 30–31, 2008	600	±4.0%	1%	44%	3%	38%	1%	3% (Note: "Other" with 2% and Kucinich with 1%.)	11%
Reuters/C-SPAN/Zogby	January 31–February 2, 2008	868	±3.4%	–	43%	–	42%	–	2% (Note: Gravel with 2%.)	14%
Survey USA	February 2–3, 2008	706	±3.8%	–	52%	–	41%	–	4% (Note: "Other" with 4%.)	3%

== Results ==
Key:	Withdrew prior to contest

2008 New Jersey Democratic presidential primary
Candidate	Votes	Percentage	National delegates
Hillary Clinton	613,500	53.76%	59
Barack Obama	501,372	43.93%	48
John Edwards	15,728	1.38%	0
Joe Biden	4,081	0.36%	0
Bill Richardson	3,366	0.29%	0
Dennis Kucinich	3,152	0.28%	0
Totals	1,141,199	100.00%	107

== Analysis ==
2008 New Jersey Democratic presidential primary
Demographic subgroup	Obama	Clinton	% of total vote
Total vote	44	54	100
Sex by race
White men	39	58	25
White women	27	72	34
Black men	85	15	10
Black women	81	14	14
Latino men	36	62	5
Latino women	26	74	7
All other races	38	58	5
Age
17–29 years old	59	39	13
30–44 years old	50	47	29
45–59 years old	38	60	35
60 and older	35	63	23
Religion
Protestant/Other Christian	56	40	35
Catholic	28	69	38
Jewish	37	63	9
Something else	61	35	8
None	51	49	11
Family income
Less than $50,000	40	58	29
$50,000 or more	45	52	71
Which issue is the most important facing the country?
The economy	44	54	47
The war in Iraq	45	51	31
Health care	42	56	18
Candidate quality that matters most
Can bring about needed change	64	35	52
Cares about people like me	43	46	13
Has the right experience	3	94	26
Has the best chance to win in November	40	60	8

== See also ==
- 2008 Democratic Party presidential primaries
- 2008 New Jersey Republican presidential primary
