= Stanley Van Ness =

American lawyer

Stanley Carlton Van Ness
- Born: February 28, 1933; Somerville, New Jersey, U.S.
- Died: September 26, 2007 (aged 74)
- Education: Rutgers University

Stanley Carlton Van Ness (February 28, 1933 – September 26, 2007) was an American jurist who worked for a number of state agencies in New Jersey, US. Most notably, he led the New Jersey Department of the Public Advocate as the first Public Advocate in New Jersey and the United States. He was the third African American to reach cabinet-level status in New Jersey.

Van Ness was born in Somerville, New Jersey. In the early 1950s, he graduated from Rutgers University, subsequently serving in the Air Force. Van Ness graduated Rutgers Law School in 1963, then becoming an Assistant United States Attorney for the District of New Jersey. A few years later, he became counsel to Governor Richard J. Hughes. In 1969, Hughes chose Van Ness to lead the New Jersey Office of the Public Defender. When the New Jersey Department of the Public Advocate was established in 1974, Van Ness was placed as its chief, and the Public Defender office was incorporated into the Public Advocate office.
