= Zulima Farber =

Zulima V. Farber

55th New Jersey Attorney General
- In office January 30, 2006 – August 31, 2006
- Governor: Jon Corzine
- Preceded by: Peter C. Harvey
- Succeeded by: Stuart Rabner

Personal details
- Born: 1944 (age 81–82) Cuba
- Party: Democratic
- Spouse: Eugene Farber (deceased-1986)
- Education: Montclair State University (B.A.); Rutgers School of Law–Newark (J.D.)
- Profession: Lawyer

Zulima Farber (born 1944) is the former Attorney General of New Jersey and the first Latina (Cuban) to serve as Acting Governor of New Jersey. She was appointed Attorney General in 2006 by Governor Jon Corzine and resigned on August 31, 2006. She was succeeded by First Assistant Attorney General Anne Milgram on an interim basis until Stuart Rabner took office on September 26, 2006.

== Biography ==
Zulima Farber fled Cuba with her siblings at age 16 following the takeover by Fidel Castro. Living at first with an aunt until her parents emigrated, she graduated from Memorial High School in West New York, and worked her way through Montclair State College and Rutgers School of Law–Newark. During her time at Rutgers Law School, she was a founding member of the Association of Latin-American Law Students.

Earlier in her career, Farber served as an Assistant Prosecutor in Bergen County and as an Assistant Counsel to then Gov. Brendan Byrne. From 1992 to 1994, she served as state Public Advocate in the Cabinet of former Gov. James Florio. She served as New Jersey Public Advocate from 1992 to 1994, and was the last public advocate to serve in the position before former Gov. Christine Todd Whitman abolished the office in 1994. The office was restored in 2005 under legislation signed by former Gov. Richard Codey and Governor Corzine's appointment of Ronald Chen to the position. When Governor Corzine nominated her to become Attorney General, she was a senior partner at the law firm of Lowenstein Sandler PC, one of New Jersey's largest firms.

In December 1996, Farber was a member of the New Jersey State Electoral College, one of 15 electors casting their votes for the Clinton/Gore ticket.

In 2003, Farber was considered for a seat on the New Jersey Supreme Court by former Gov. James McGreevey. A nomination did not materialize after it was revealed that she had an unpaid traffic ticket for unsafe driving, which led to a bench warrant being issued. Farber claimed she received no notice of a hearing and paid a fine to resolve the matter. The driving record issue would later be raised against Farber during her confirmation hearing for Attorney General in the New Jersey Senate.

== Nomination as Attorney General ==
During Farber's nomination proceedings, Senator Gerald Cardinale, a Republican from Bergen County, directed some of the most pointed queries at Farber. "Can you tell me how many times you've gotten speeding tickets or is it an isolated incident?" Cardinale asked. Farber apologized for her driving history but offered no specifics. She acknowledged some personal difficulties with driving and added,"...I thank the governor for giving me a job with a driver." Cardinale asked Farber about the bench warrants; state records show warrants were issued against her in 1996 and 2003.

Cardinale, one of two Republicans to oppose Farber's nomination, said that he was concerned about the state appointing someone who had been repeatedly accused of breaking traffic laws as its top law enforcement official. "Your record taken in its totality does not support the notion that you have respect for the law," he said. Later, he said that approving Farber's nomination might send a message "to young people, to the whole population of the state of New Jersey, that it's O.K. to offend the law repeatedly time after time. To have bench warrants issued for your arrest is not an impediment. I cannot bring myself to vote for you."

In reply to questions about legal matters, Farber said she opposed the use of deadly force to protect property and the use of mandatory minimum sentences, which she said takes away discretion from judges. She also promised to vigorously pursue allegations of public corruption.

== Acting Governorship ==
On February 2, 2006, Farber became the first Latina to serve as Acting Governor of New Jersey. This occurred when the Governor, Senate President and Assembly Speaker all left the state for a dinner in Washington, D.C. Under the New Jersey State Constitution, Farber exercised the powers of the Governor until Governor Corzine or one of the legislative leaders returned to the state.

== Fairview traffic stop incident ==
On May 26, 2006, Farber's boyfriend, Hamlet Goore, was stopped by police in Fairview, in Bergen County, for driving an unregistered vehicle. The police issued at least one ticket to Goore and were going to impound the vehicle. As this was happening, Goore called Farber, who had her New Jersey State Police driver drive from Newark to Fairview. At the scene, Farber met with Fairview's mayor, Vincent Belluci. Farber claims that she was there just to help Goore remove items from his car before it was impounded. However, the tickets that the Fairview police issued to Goore were withdrawn and his car was not impounded. As a result of this incident, a retired state appellate judge from Atlantic County, Richard J. Williams, headed a special investigation at the request of the New Jersey Governor's Office to look into whether Farber abused her position as Attorney General or broke any laws.

Williams' report, released on August 15, 2006, concluded that Farber violated the state's code of ethics but did not commit a crime when she showed up at the scene of her boyfriend's traffic stop in May 2006. The report found Farber innocent of the more significant ethical violations she was accused of. She was found not to have requested special favors from any officer or ticket fixing, nor any "fixing" or inappropriate favors from the Motor Vehicle Commission in regard to the restoration of her boyfriend's driving privileges.

== Resignation ==
On August 15, 2006, as a result of the conclusions drawn by Williams during his investigation, Farber announced her resignation from the office of Attorney General, effective August 31, saying that she was stepping down on her own initiative "out of respect for the Governor," and not because she had been asked to resign. This came about after the chairman of the Judiciary Committee, State Senator John Adler, called for her resignation, and Governor Corzine allegedly requested that she resign during a private meeting.

Motor vehicle records show that Farber had at least 12 speeding tickets, four bench warrants issued for her arrest and three license suspensions.

After Farber left office on September 1, 2006, First Assistant Attorney General Anne Milgram became Acting Attorney General.

Farber has since joined Issues Management, a Princeton-based lobbying firm affiliated with the law firm Lowenstein Sandler.

Legal offices
Preceded by Peter C. Harvey	New Jersey Attorney General; January 2006 – August 2006	Succeeded by Anne Milgram (acting)
