= Stuart Rabner =

American judge (born 1960)

Chief Justice of the New Jersey Supreme Court
- Incumbent
- Assumed office June 29, 2007
- Appointed by: Jon Corzine
- Preceded by: James Zazzali

56th Attorney General of New Jersey
- In office September 26, 2006 – June 29, 2007
- Governor: Jon Corzine
- Preceded by: Anne Milgram (acting)
- Succeeded by: Anne Milgram

Personal details
- Born: Stuart Jeff Rabner; June 30, 1960 (age 66) Passaic, New Jersey, U.S.
- Party: Democratic
- Spouse: Deborah Wiener (m. 1989)
- Children: 3
- Education: Princeton University (BA); Harvard University (JD)

Stuart Jeff Rabner (born June 30, 1960) is an American judge and lawyer who has been the chief justice of the New Jersey Supreme Court since 2007. He previously served as New Jersey Attorney General, chief counsel to Governor Jon Corzine, and as a federal prosecutor at the U.S. Attorney's Office for the District of New Jersey.

== Background ==
Stuart Jeff Rabner was born in Passaic, New Jersey, on June 30, 1960. He graduated from Passaic High School in 1978, where he was the class valedictorian. He graduated summa cum laude with a Bachelor of Arts from the Woodrow Wilson School of Public and International Affairs at Princeton University in 1982 after completing a 172-page long senior thesis titled "A Commitment Compromised: The Treatment of Nazi War Criminals by the United States Government." He then graduated cum laude from Harvard Law School in 1985. He is a resident of Caldwell, New Jersey. He was married in 1989 to Dr. Deborah Ann Wiener, and has three children: Erica, Carly, and Jack. In June 2007, he was named the most influential political personality in the state of New Jersey.

== Early career ==
Rabner began his legal career as a judicial law clerk to Judge Dickinson R. Debevoise of the United States District Court for the District of New Jersey before joining the office of the United States Attorney for the District of New Jersey in Newark in 1986. In the U.S. Attorney's office, he worked in a number of positions including first assistant United States attorney and chief of the terrorism unit in the office of the United States Attorney for the District of New Jersey. He was chief of the office's criminal division and supervised 100 attorneys and staff, when he was named chief counsel to Governor Corzine in January 2006. He was viewed as a surprise choice for the chief counsel position, as it traditionally goes to individuals with strong political connections and not to career prosecutors.

=== New Jersey Attorney General ===
Rabner served as Attorney General of New Jersey in the cabinet of Governor Jon Corzine. He took office as attorney general on September 26, 2006. Rabner was nominated by Governor Corzine on August 24, 2006, to replace former Attorney General Zulima Farber who resigned and left office on August 31, 2006. On September 25, 2006, Rabner was confirmed by a 35–0 margin by the New Jersey Senate.

== New Jersey Chief Justice ==
On June 4, 2007, Governor Corzine nominated Rabner to be Chief Justice of the New Jersey Supreme Court, replacing James R. Zazzali, who was nearing the mandatory retirement age.

Shortly after the nomination, two members of the New Jersey Senate from Essex County, where Rabner resides, blocked consideration of his confirmation by invoking "senatorial courtesy", a Senate tradition that allows home county legislators to intercede to prevent consideration of a nominee from the counties they represent. State Senator Ronald Rice had initially blocked the nomination, but relented on June 15, 2007, after a meeting with the governor. Senator Nia Gill dropped her block on June 19, 2007, but did not initially explain the nature of concerns.

With the senators permitting consideration of his nomination, Rabner was approved by the Senate Judiciary Committee, with Gill casting the only negative vote. On June 21, 2007, the New Jersey Senate confirmed Rabner as Chief Justice by a 36–1 vote, with Gill again casting the lone dissenting vote.

Rabner was sworn in as chief justice on June 29, 2007, with acting Chief Justice Virginia Long administering the oath of office. On May 21, 2014, Governor Chris Christie renominated Rabner as chief justice despite their political differences, after a compromise was reached with State Senate Democrats, breaking a longstanding impasse over Supreme Court appointments. The Senate Judiciary Committee confirmed the nomination on June 14, 2014.

In 2010, Christopher L. Eisgruber recommended Rabner as a choice to succeed John Paul Stevens on the U.S. Supreme Court.

=== Decisions ===
Chief Justice Rabner authored significant decisions regarding, among other issues, eyewitness identification, the right to privacy, marriage equality, juvenile justice, government transparency, the separation of church and state, fairness in jury selection, and protections against unreasonable searches and seizures.

==== Eyewitness identification ====
In 2011, Chief Justice Rabner authored a landmark decision on eyewitness identification evidence in State v. Henderson. The ruling questioned the longstanding test for admitting eyewitness identifications at trial. Henderson outlined a new standard under the New Jersey Constitution in light of more recent, accepted social science evidence on the risks of misidentification. The following year, the NJ Supreme Court released expanded model jury instructions on eyewitness identifications for use in criminal cases, consistent with the Henderson decision.

==== Privacy rights ====
In 2013, Chief Justice Rabner broke new legal ground in a decision about the right to privacy in the location of one's cell phone. The opinion in State v. Earls marked the first time a state supreme court found a right of privacy in cell-phone location information. In light of recent advances in technology, the Earls decision noted that cell-phone providers in 2013 can pinpoint the location of a person's cell phone with increasing accuracy. The opinion held that, under the State Constitution, cell-phone users are reasonably entitled to expect confidentiality in the location of their cell phones. As a result, to obtain cell-phone location information, police must obtain a search warrant based on a showing of probable cause or qualify for an exception to the warrant requirement, such as exigent circumstances. In 2018, the United States Supreme Court ruled in Carpenter v. United States that historical cell-phone location information is protected by the Fourth Amendment, and the government must get a search warrant to acquire that type of record.

In 2023, the Supreme Court considered requests made by law enforcement to compel Facebook to provide the contents of users' accounts every 15 minutes for 30 days into the future. The Chief Justice's opinion in Facebook, Inc. v. State of New Jersey, concluded that, because the nearly contemporaneous acquisition of electronic communications was the functional equivalent of wiretap surveillance, the protections of the wiretap act applied to safeguard individual privacy rights.

==== Marriage equality ====
Chief Justice Rabner authored a unanimous decision in 2013 denying the state's application for a stay of a trial court order permitting same-sex couples to marry. Garden State Equality v. Dow The ruling was the first by a state supreme court in the wake of the United States Supreme Court's decision in United States v. Windsor. Windsor struck down part of the federal Defense of Marriage Act (DOMA) and held that DOMA violated the federal constitution by denying lawfully married same-sex couples the benefits given to married couples of the opposite sex. In the wake of that decision, a number of federal agencies extended federal benefits to married same-sex couples but not to partners in civil unions. Under New Jersey state law, same-sex couples could enter into civil unions but could not marry. As a result, the New Jersey Supreme Court concluded that the state constitution's guarantee of equal protection for same-sex couples was not being met; that the harm to same-sex couples was real, not speculative; and that the public interest did not favor a stay. Three days after the ruling, same-sex couples began to marry, and the state withdrew its appeal of the trial court order, effectively ending the litigation.

==== Juvenile justice ====
In 2017, Chief Justice Rabner authored a significant ruling in the area of juvenile justice. In State v. Zuber & Comer, New Jersey's high court unanimously extended recent rulings by the U.S. Supreme Court and directed that state trial judges consider various factors related to youth before imposing a sentence that is the practical equivalent of life without parole. Years later, in State v. Comer & Zarate, authored by the Chief Justice, the court held that juvenile offenders sentenced to a mandatory terms of at least 30 years without parole can petition for review of their sentence after they have served two decades in prison, in order to save the sentencing scheme from constitutional infirmity.

==== Government transparency ====
Also in 2017, the Chief Justice wrote for a unanimous court that footage from dashboard cameras must be made public when the police use fatal force. In North Jersey Media Group v. Lyndhurst, the court concluded that once the principal witnesses to the shooting have been interviewed, the public's powerful interest in transparency calls for the release of police dash-cam videos under the common law right of access. More detailed investigative reports and witness statements, which if released would impair the integrity of an ongoing investigation, are not ordinarily subject to disclosure while an investigation is underway.

==== Separation of Church and State ====
In Freedom From Religion Foundation v. Morris County, at 232 N.J. 543 (2018) the Chief Justice authored a 2018 opinion that struck Morris County's award of $4.6 million in historic preservation grant funds to restore twelve churches. The Court held that the grants ran afoul of the State Constitution's Religious Aid Clause, which dates back to 1776 and bars the use of taxpayer funds to repair churches. The grants funded repairs of church buildings that housed regular worship services. The Court found that the application of the Religious Aid Clause in the case did not violate the First Amendment's Free Exercise Clause under current law, including the U.S. Supreme Court's recent decision in Trinity Lutheran Church of Columbia, Inc. v. Comer.

==== Fairness in jury selection ====
In State v. Edwin Andujar, issued in 2021, the Chief Justice wrote for a unanimous court on several issues relating to fairness in jury selection. The court first held that any party seeking to run a criminal history check on a prospective juror must present a reasonable basis for the request and obtain advance permission from the trial judge. The ruling also expanded existing law in concluding that the removal of a juror based on counsel's implicit or unconscious bias can violate a defendant's right to a fair trial in the same way that purposeful discrimination can. In addition, the opinion called for a Judicial Conference on Jury Selection to consider additional steps needed to root out discrimination in the way juries are selected. After the Conference, the Court enacted a new rule designed to reduce bias in the exercise of peremptory challenges in jury selection.

==== Protections against unreasonable searches and seizures ====
Also in 2021, the Supreme Court addressed a law that authorized police officers to stop and ticket motorists when a license plate frame "conceals or otherwise obscures" any marking on a license plate. In prior years, more than 100,000 drivers had been ticketed annually even if the markings on their plates were legible. To avoid serious constitutional concerns, the Chief Justice's opinion construed the statute narrowly to apply to situations when markings on a license plate cannot reasonably be identified. The decision also declined to follow the United States Supreme Court's ruling in Heien v. North Carolina, which held that a reasonable mistake of law could justify a stop under the Fourth Amendment, and noted that the New Jersey Constitution provides greater protection against unreasonable searches and seizures.

== Initiatives ==
Rabner launched a series of initiatives to implement reforms in the state's municipal courts, improve how courts respond to individuals with mental illness, reduce discrimination in the jury selection process and promote more representative juries, enlist volunteers to monitor court-appointed guardians, improve the handling of complex commercial cases, assist veterans, connect Recovery Court graduates and probationers with training programs and employment opportunities, promote access and fairness in the court system, and introduce new uses of technology to make the Judiciary more accessible and efficient, among other areas.

Starting in 2013, Rabner chaired a Joint Committee on Criminal Justice, composed of judges, the attorney general, public defender, representatives of the executive and legislative branches, the ACLU, and private practitioners. In March 2014, the Committee issued a final report that called for bail reform and the enactment of a state speedy trial act.

As part of wholesale revisions to the pending system of pretrial release, the committee proposed that defendants be released based on objective measures of risk and be supervised by pretrial services officers before trial; that judges rely less on imposing "money bail", so that defendants who pose little risk of flight or danger but have limited assets are not held in jail for long periods before trial; and that the State Constitution be amended to allow for pretrial detention of defendants who pose a substantial risk of flight and danger to the community.

The group of recommendations received widespread support and were enacted into law in August 2014. Citizens voted to amend the Constitution in November 2014, and the new law went into effect on January 1, 2017. The results of the first years of the reforms to the state's criminal justice system are summarized in several reports. They showed criminal justice reform proved effective in maintaining the balance between public safety and the rights of the accused and that the practice of holding low-risk defendants in jail for the inability to pay bail had declined dramatically.

== See also ==
- Barack Obama Supreme Court candidates
- List of Jewish American jurists

Legal offices
Preceded by Anne Milgram; Acting	Attorney General of New Jersey; 2006–2007	Succeeded by Anne Milgram
Preceded by James Zazzali	Chief Justice of the New Jersey Supreme Court; 2007–present	Incumbent
