= New Jersey Department of the Public Advocate =

New Jersey government department

State of New Jersey Department of the Public Advocate

Agency overview
- Formed: 1974 (abolished 1994, reinstated 2005, abolished 2010)
- Superseding agency: New Jersey Office of the Public Defender
- Jurisdiction: New Jersey
- Headquarters: 240 West State Street, 16th Floor, Trenton, N.J. 08625

The New Jersey Department of the Public Advocate was a department within the Executive Branch of the New Jersey state government that acted as a voice on behalf of the people of the state. It was responsible to make government "more accountable and responsive to the needs of New Jersey residents" through legal advocacy, policy research and reform and community and legislative outreach.

The department was originally created in 1974 (NJ P.L. 1974, c. 27) by Governor Brendan Byrne. The first Public Advocate was Stanley Van Ness. Wilfredo Caraballo served as Public Advocate from 1990 to 1992, resigning in protest of Republican Party efforts in the legislature to reduce his powers.

The agency was dissolved in 1994 (NJ P.L. 1994, c. 58), ending the tenure of Zulima Farber under Governor James Florio. The New Jersey Legislature passed the Public Advocate Restoration Act (NJ P.L. 2005, c. 155) in 2005, which was signed into law on July 12, 2005, by Governor Richard Codey.

In 2006, Governor Jon Corzine appointed Ronald Chen to serve as the first Public Advocate since the position had been abolished in 1994. Upon entering office as governor in early 2010, Republican Chris Christie began plotting the elimination of this department. On June 29, 2010, Governor Christie signed into law NJ P.L. 2010, c. 34, which abolished the Department of the Public Advocate, transferring some offices and divisions to other departments, and abolishing others.
