= Kimberly Ricketts =

New Jersey politician

Commissioner of the Department of Children and Families
- In office July 1, 2008 – January 19, 2010
- Governor: Jon Corzine
- Preceded by: Kevin Ryan

Kimberly Ricketts is a New Jersey politician. She served as New Jersey's Commissioner of Families and Children under Governor Jon Corzine.

== Early life and education ==
Ricketts majored in human services at the University of North Carolina at Charlotte. She also minored in child and family development. Later, Ricketts earned her masters of education from the University of North Carolina at Charlotte.

Ricckets spent her early career working on children and family focused organizations in North Carolina, Florida and New Jersey.

== New Jersey government ==
Governor Richard Codey appointed Ricketts as executive director of his 2004 Task Force on Mental Health. In 2005, Ricketts served as Acting Director of the New Jersey Division of Consumer Affairs. In August 2006, Ricketts became the Administrator of New Jersey's Department of Law and Public Safety. The position included oversight of the budgets of the New Jersey Attorney General's Office.

In June 2008, Governor Jon Corzine nominated Ricketts, then a resident of Highland Park, New Jersey, to serve as the Commissioner of the Department of Children and Families ("DCF"). Corzine had created the DCF only two years prior as part of a settlement with the advocacy group Children's Rights which had sued the state of New Jersey. She was sworn in as Acting Commissioner on July 1, 2008, replacing outgoing Commissioner Kevin Ryan. Under Rickett's leadership, the Department of Children and Families partnered with Casey Family Programs to launch the "Raise Me Up" campaign to bring awareness to the state foster care system. Children's Rights expressed its approval of Ricketts' performance as Commissioner, noting the progress the state made in increasing adoptions out of foster care and establishing children's medical units in each Division of Youth and Family Services office.

Shortly before taking office, incoming Governor Chris Christie dismissed Ricketts, along with two other Corzine appointed Commissioners, effective January 19, 2010. In 2011, Ricketts testified in the lawsuit of a former employee of the Division of Consumer Affairs who claimed Ricketts terminated him in violation of the state whistle blowing statute. The employee was awarded damages and reinstated following trial.

== Post-government career ==
In June 2010, the Casey Family Programs hired Ricketts as Managing Director for Strategic Consulting.
