= Phi Tau =

Co-ed fraternity at Dartmouth College

- ΦΤ
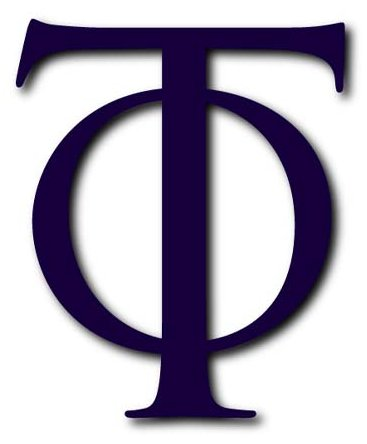
- Founded: March 7, 1956; 70 years ago Dartmouth College
- Type: Social
- Affiliation: Independent
- Former affiliation: Phi Sigma Kappa's, Tau chapter, 1905-1956
- Status: Active
- Scope: Local
- Motto: "Unitas in Diversitate" ("Unity in Diversity")
- Colors: Blue and White
- Chapters: 1
- Headquarters: 31 N. Main Street; Hanover, New Hampshire 03755; United States
- Website: phi-tau.org

Phi Tau (ΦΤ) is a coeducational fraternity at Dartmouth College in Hanover, New Hampshire. Founded in 1905 as the Tau chapter of Phi Sigma Kappa, the organization separated from the national fraternity in 1956 over a dispute regarding the segregationist membership policies of the national organization. The fraternity renamed itself Phi Tau Fraternity, and in 1972 became the first fraternity at Dartmouth to admit women student members. Today, Phi Tau Coeducational Fraternity is one of only three remaining, officially recognized coeducational Greek organizations on the Dartmouth College campus.

== History ==
=== Phi Sigma Kappa ===
Phi Tau Coeducational Fraternity at Dartmouth College was founded as the Tau chapter of Phi Sigma Kappa in 1905. Phi Sigma Kappa was the sixteenth fraternity to open a chapter at Dartmouth. Being a relatively late arrival on campus, prime lots on Webster Avenue, where most of the other fraternities were located, were unavailable. With the help of the national organization, a house for the fraternity was purchased on what was then the northern edge of the college campus. By the late 1920s, however, the house had begun to show its age, and a building campaign resulted in the demolition of the old building and the construction of a new building during the 1927-1928 academic year. This new house was built with three stories above ground with a basement, and included living quarters for eighteen students (the maximum permitted by the College at the time.) Although the new residence included a kitchen, fraternities at Dartmouth were not allowed to serve meals on a regular basis, and the kitchen was used primarily by the residents and during social functions. Over the years, there were many changes to the building, including two different porches constructed on the south side of the building, the installation of sump pumps which allowed finishing of rooms in the basement, and the relocation of the boiler room, social areas, and even a staircase.

The brotherhood of the Tau chapter of Phi Sigma Kappa underwent a great transition in the years of World War II and immediately afterward. Many members of the classes of 1942 through 1945 were rushed through their academic studies and went off to war without so much as a graduation ceremony. At the same time, the U.S. Navy organized a V-12 Navy College Training Program on the Dartmouth College campus. Many Phi Sigma Kappa men from Dartmouth went off to war, and at least one spent time as a prisoner of war. When these same brothers returned to finish their education after the war, attitudes in the house were less innocent, which changed how the brotherhood treated one another. Certain pre-war pledge activities, for example, were completely eliminated, as their shock value no longer entertained anyone.

=== Separation from Phi Sigma Kappa ===
The post-WWII era was a time of rapid social change, facilitated by the integration of the US Military. Colleges and universities were the next locus of change as returning GIs flocked to the educational opportunities granted under the G.I. Bill, many of whom rejected the former class and race rigidity that was the status quo on their campuses. This was more strongly true in the older East Coast schools, but appeared soon at college locations in the West, Midwest and even the South. Like some of its other chapters, the Tau chapter of Phi Sigma Kappa had a history of being progressive about its membership. Until 1952, the Phi Sigma Kappa national organization did not have a formal policy regarding membership of ethnic or religious minorities in its written charter or regulations, while it did host the occasional non-white foreign student. However, the influx of new collegians of all races led some chapters to push for legislation to encourage all local chapters to avoid admitting minorities to membership. In a contentious debate in 1952, the matter was brought to a head, with opposition to this restriction voiced by Tau chapter members, among others. A policy was adopted, narrowly, called The Bedford Resolution, which read: "That the fraternity's tradition be maintained in the sense that there be no pledging or initiating of Negro men until such time as they are acceptable to all chapters." "Bedford" was not written into the national organization's bylaws, but its short-term effect was nevertheless destructive: Phi Sigma Kappa chapters at Boston University and Knox College were both expelled from the national organization in 1953 for pledging African-American students. The Tau chapter had been quietly opposed to this agreement, and had already admitted several Jewish men into the house. A campus-wide referendum on the desegregation of fraternities in 1954 resulted in a slim majority of Dartmouth students favoring mandatory desegregation of fraternities by 1960. This became a binding policy of the college administration.

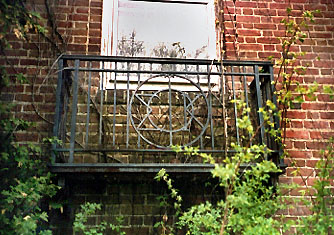
The stylized Greek letters ΦΣΚ appear in a wrought iron railing on the southwest corner of the 1928 residence, photographed in 1995.

Many Dartmouth Phi Sigma Kappa brothers held out hope that the national organization might eventually reverse the Bedford Resolution, but while they awaited a legislative solution, Richard Scobie, class of 1956, reports that some were dismayed by examples of "racist attitudes of certain leaders." Several national organization leaders and their wives visited Dartmouth for a party celebrating the Tau chapter's 50th anniversary in May, 1955. National President A.L. Atcheson, District Director Bob Abbe, and District Deputy Sam Sargent all attended. Scobie relays: "Abbe was reported to have commented to several brothers, including Dick Taft, class of 1956 and then vice-president of the chapter, Well, it's this way. We've got to watch out for all minority groups; not just the Negroes. In different areas you've got to watch out for different things, sometimes it's Italians, sometimes it's Jews, sometimes it's Negroes." Unbeknownst to Abbe, Dick Taft was Jewish. However, this anecdotal report has no corroboration in other sources; Abbe himself was Jewish, and Phi Sigma Kappa had already had a number of Jewish members. However, Scobie made the claim that this was the cause for "many in the chapter [to be] outraged and [offer] proposals to "go local" or to affiliate with a different national fraternity at the house meeting immediately following the visit. [However] no consensus was reached at the time, with the end of the academic year rapidly approaching."

Nationally, "Bedford" had proven to be harmful, and had been repealed by the National fraternity at the 1954 convention only two years after it had passed. It was replaced by a much weaker, unwritten "Gentlemen's Agreement," with similar provisions but no real legislative teeth, which more progressive leaders thought they could use to soothe the process of change for trailing chapters. For some chapters, this was enough, but for others, like Tau, the demand for change would allow no mitigating steps. Tau did not attend the 1954 convention in Roanoke, Virginia.

The movement for Tau to secede from the Phi Sigma Kappa national was rejuvenated in the early winter of 1956. Scobie, then outgoing chapter president, personally resigned his affiliation with the national fraternity in a letter in which he accused Phi Sigma Kappa of "black reactionary ideals." A week later debate continued, and the first vote to disaffiliate failed to gain the two-thirds majority called for in the motion with a result of 41 local, 20 national, and 3 abstaining. A week later on March 7, 1956, the Tau chapter voted again to permanently separate from the national organization, with the ballot this time passing 54 local to 7 national. After briefly considering the name Phi Sigma Tau, the house decided to name themselves Phi Tau Fraternity. The history of the separation was chronicled by Dick Scobie for his senior thesis.

Phi Tau was thus formed in May 1956. Ironically, it still won the debate on the national level: Phi Sigma Kappa voted at its next convention, just two months later in July 1956, to rescind the "Gentleman's Agreement," and with this action its chapters became free to admit members of all races. It had lost reactionary Tau, but, Phi Sig, to its credit, became one of the first national fraternities to put to rest strife over race. That same year, 1956, its Phi chapter at Swarthmore pledged a black man from the Gold Coast, with no reaction from national leadership. Many national fraternities struggled with this issue into the 1980s.

Phi Sigma Kappa has remained male-only, having itself had little call to change that policy. However, should that call ever come, among fraternities, a workable co-ed solution may be observed, where several national fraternities have adopted co-ed "Society" versions of themselves, as parallel organizations, to accommodate those chapters that choose to become co-educational. An example is the Alpha Delta Phi fraternity and the Alpha Delta Phi Society, the latter of which hosts its co-ed chapters and where both use the fraternity's symbols. Phi Sigma Kappa has never been petitioned for similar formation of a co-ed "branch," thus how it would respond is unknown. However, it has expressed strong interest in reopening closed and 'legacy' chapters on its older campuses.

Today, Phi Sigma Kappa's stated anti-discrimination policy is progressive: "No chapter shall discriminate in recruitment or in membership based on race, color, religion, national origin, age, disability, ethnic background, sexual orientation, veteran status, marital status, parental status, or political affiliation."

=== Coeducation to the present ===
Dartmouth College began to admit women students with the freshman class of 1972, which resulted in women members being allowed under current Dartmouth College rules of being accepted to fraternities during the spring semester of 1973. During the winter of 1972/1973, Phi Tau initiated a vote to allow it to become the first coeducational fraternity at Dartmouth College, and to admit women beginning in the spring rush year of 1973. When the organization's constitution was rewritten to reflect the new local status of the brotherhood in 1956, gender references were deliberately excluded from the text, making the house officially coeducational before the college itself. The vote in 1973 formally confirmed the membership policy. Unlike other coeducational Greek houses, members of Phi Tau have continued to refer to one another as "brothers", regardless of their gender. Phi Tau is the only coeducational Greek house at Dartmouth that has always had female members since first admitting them, and was the first fraternity at the College to add sexual preference to its non-discrimination clause.

In the 1980s, the Phi Tau residence began to face serious structural problems after the removal of a porch on the south side of the building. The walls of the building were constructed out of brick. Presented with different loads and stresses, the north wall began to bulge outward by nearly half a meter, and was literally threatening to explode. Large steel plates were placed on the outside of the building and steel tie rods were threaded through the building between the ground and second floor to pull the plates together and force the exterior walls to straighten. A new tradition began of articles in alumni newsletters proclaiming, "The north wall is still standing!"

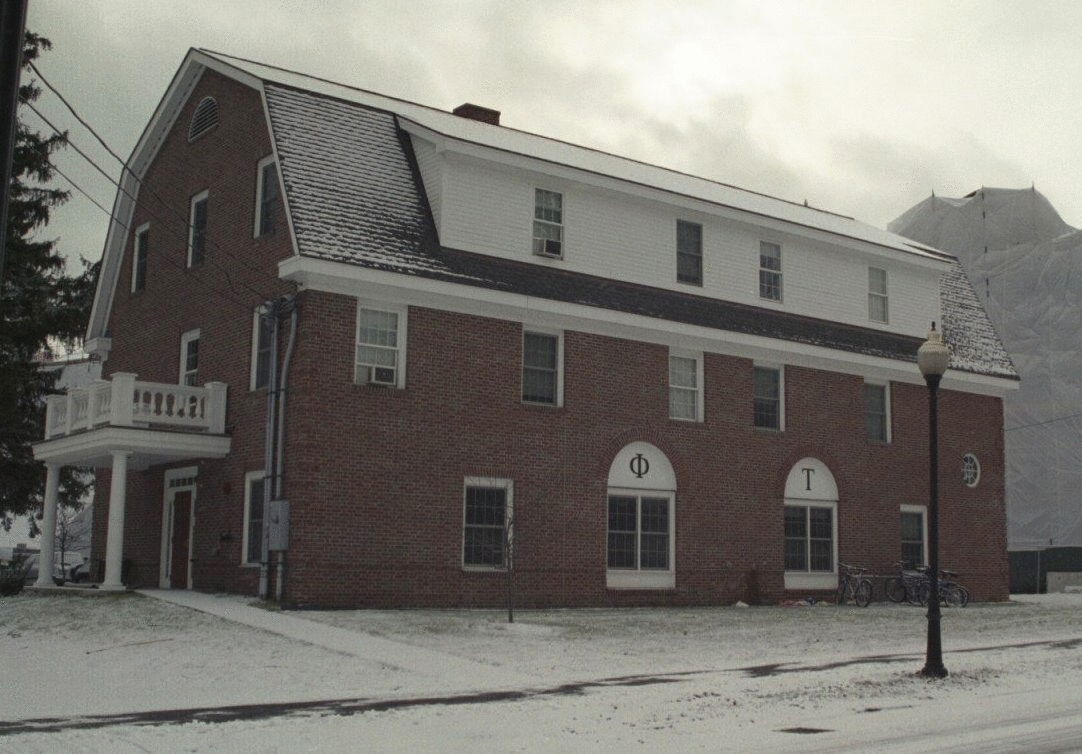
The ΦΤ residence at Dartmouth College, constructed in 2002, photographed in the winter of 2005.

The College introduced undergraduate societies to campus in 1993, as a residential and social alternative to Greek organizations. Similar to the Greek houses in many respects, undergraduate societies were required to have open, coeducational membership policies. Panarchy, a coeducational fraternity with a 97-year history at Dartmouth, voted to change its status to an undergraduate society and was joined the following year by a newly formed society, called Amarna. Phi Tau chose to remain a Greek house. In 1999, the College administration announced a "Residential and Social Life Initiative" to improve campus life. Speculation that all Greek houses at Dartmouth College might be forced to open admissions to anyone who wanted to join drew attention to Phi Tau's status as an already coeducational institution, but one that still held to Greek traditions. Then house president Virginia DeJesus-Rueff, class of 2000, defended Phi Tau's policy of self-selection.

In 2000, Dartmouth College unveiled a new master plan for the north side of the campus. The development plan called for the creation of a green on the northern side of the libraries in the center of campus, and anticipated the use of a portion of the property owned by Phi Tau. The fraternity entered into negotiations to sell 1,675 square metres (0.4 acres) of property to the College in exchange for the funds and construction support to build a new house to replace the existing Phi Tau building. The new structure was built during the summer and fall academic terms of 2002, for a sum in excess of $1.8 million. The new structure was located between North Main Street and the 1928 house. Student members of Phi Tau continued to occupy the old house during construction of the new building. Phi Tau brothers began living in the new house in the winter term of 2003, and the house built in 1928 was demolished in January 2003.

== Membership and activities ==
Like other fraternities and sororities, membership in Phi Tau is self-selective. The process of joining Phi Tau, called "rush," invites potential student members to apply for admission. Members of the house then deliberate on these applications at an official house meeting and decide whether or not to offer a bid to each prospective new member. Anyone offered a bid to join may "sink" the bid, and thereby join the house, whenever they wish to do so until they graduate. Phi Tau, like most other Greek organizations in the United States, has a pledge period. Like all Dartmouth College Greek organizations, Phi Tau holds a weekly house meeting at which only brothers and faculty advisors may be in attendance.

== Associations ==
Phi Tau Coeducational Fraternity is owned by the non-profit Tau Corporation of Hanover, New Hampshire. All past and present members of the fraternity are voting members of the not-for-profit corporation, which meets at least annually. Phi Tau Coeducational Fraternity is a recognized fraternal student organization of Dartmouth College and is a member organization of the Co-Ed Council. Phi Tau has had a long-standing charitable relationship with the Karnak Shriners of Montreal, Quebec, Canada, supporting their Hospital for Burned Children. A major Phi Tau social event each summer is the Shriners Day Parade down North Main Street in front of the Phi Tau house. Another important charitable relationship for Phi Tau is the Upper Valley Humane Society.

== Notable members ==
- Joseph Marsh, class of 1947 - President of Concord University from 1959 to 1973
- John Hagelin, PhD., class of 1975 - quantum physicist who developed a unified field theory based on the Superstring Theory; Natural Law Party candidate for President of the United States in 1992, 1996, and 2000.
- Jeffrey Weeks, class of 1978 - Mathematician and MacArthur Fellow.
- Ronald Chen, class of 1980 - Appointed Public Advocate of the state of New Jersey in 2006.

== See also ==
- List of social fraternities
