= Anne Milgram =

American attorney & academic (born 1970)

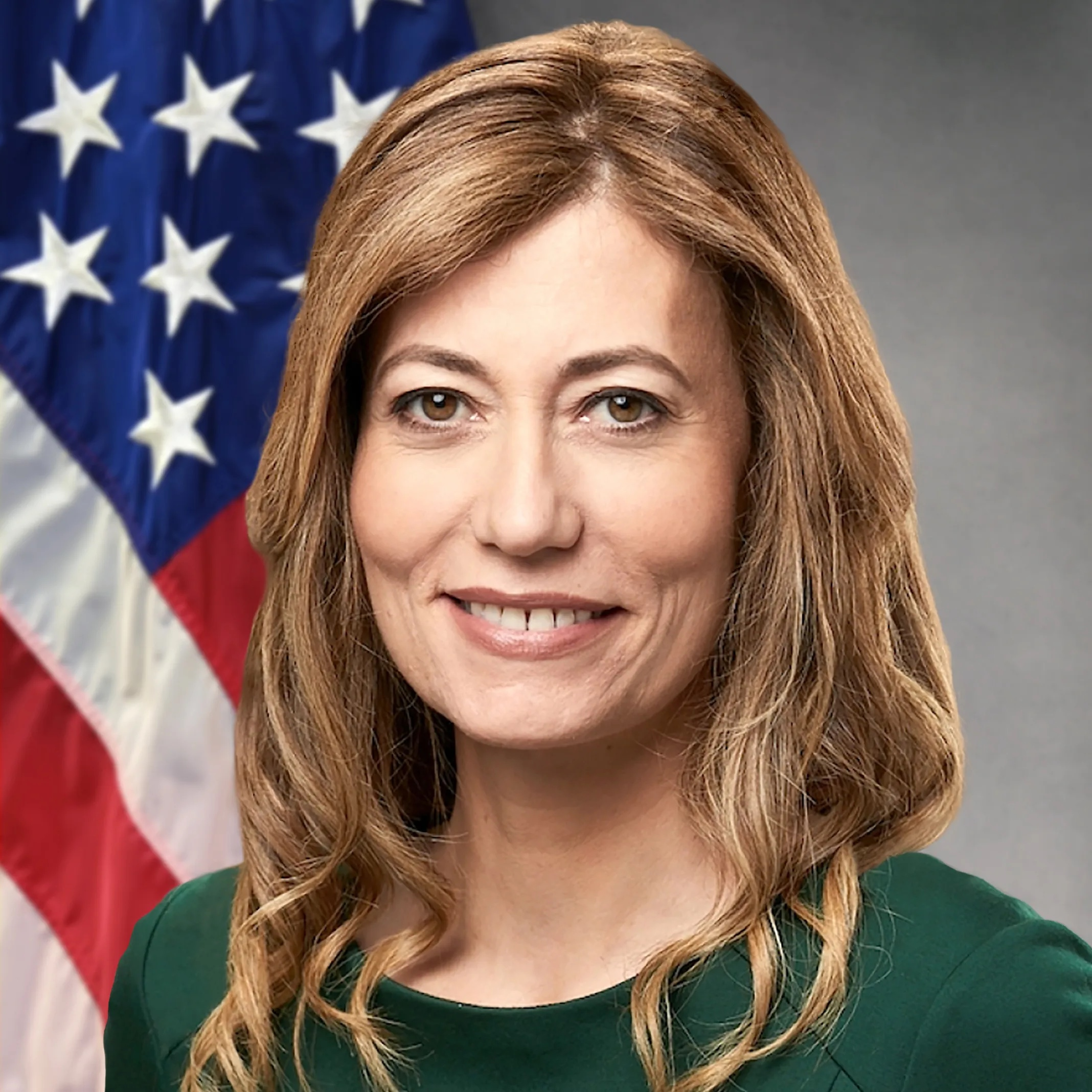

11th Administrator of the Drug Enforcement Administration
- In office June 28, 2021 – January 20, 2025
- President: Joe Biden
- Deputy: Preston Grubbs; Louis J. Milione
- Preceded by: Michele Leonhart (2015)
- Succeeded by: Terry Cole

57th Attorney General of New Jersey
- In office June 29, 2007 – January 18, 2010
- Governor: Jon Corzine; Chris Christie
- Preceded by: Stuart Rabner
- Succeeded by: Paula Dow
- In office Acting: August 31, 2006 – September 26, 2006
- Governor: Jon Corzine
- Preceded by: Zulima Farber
- Succeeded by: Stuart Rabner

Personal details
- Born: December 1, 1970 (age 55) Perth Amboy, New Jersey, U.S.
- Party: Democratic
- Education: Rutgers University (BA); Trinity Hall, Cambridge (MPhil); New York University (JD)

Anne Melissa Milgram (born December 1, 1970) is an American attorney and academic who served as the 11th Administrator of the Drug Enforcement Administration (DEA) from 2021 to 2025. She previously served as the 57th Attorney General of New Jersey from 2007 to 2010.

== Early life and education ==
Milgram was born on December 1, 1970, in Perth Amboy, New Jersey. She grew up in East Brunswick, New Jersey, the daughter of Gail (née Gleason) and William "Bill" Milgram. Her mother was a professor at Rutgers University, and her father was an engineer. She has one sister Lynn Milgram Mayer who is a college professor.

Milgram served as a congressional page while attending East Brunswick High School. She graduated summa cum laude from Rutgers University, New Brunswick in 1992 with a degree in English and political science, where she was also a member of the Cap and Skull Senior Honor Society. She earned her Master of Philosophy in social and political theory from Trinity Hall, Cambridge, in 1993 and subsequently received her Juris Doctor from the New York University School of Law in 1996.

== Career ==
Milgram clerked for United States District Court Judge Anne Elise Thompson in Trenton, from 1996 to 1997. In 1997, she began her career as an Assistant District Attorney in the Manhattan District Attorney's Office. Milgram later worked in the Criminal Section of the Civil Rights Division, United States Department of Justice, where she served as the special litigation counsel for human trafficking and led the department's human trafficking prosecutions. Milgram was counsel to Senator Jon Corzine during his final year in the United States Senate.

=== Attorney General of New Jersey ===
Milgram became Acting Attorney General on September 1, 2006, following the resignation of former Attorney General Zulima Farber. From 2007 to 2010, Milgram served as New Jersey's Attorney General.

In 2007, Milgram announced a partnership with the U.S. Bureau of Alcohol, Tobacco, Firearms and Explosives (ATF) to allow New Jersey to trace the sources of illegal firearms through real-time electronic access to ATF's E-Trace system, a national database that lists a firearm's first purchaser, date of purchase, and the retailer from which the gun was purchased. As Attorney General, Milgram directed all police departments in New Jersey to forward all gun tracing information to E-trace to build a New Jersey database.

=== Other roles ===
==== Arnold Foundation ====
From 2011-2015, Milgram was head of the Criminal Justice Initiative at the Laura and John Arnold Foundation. She led the creation, development and national implementation of a new pretrial risk assessment tool to provide judges with more information for when they decide whether to release or jail people who have been arrested.

==== Law & Order: Special Victims Unit ====
From 2013 to 2021, Milgram served as one of Wolf Entertainment's legal advisors, consulting on the hit television series Law & Order: Special Victims Unit. In this role, she worked with the show's writers, producers, and actors to help portray the courtroom and the country's legal system as accurately as possible.

==== Lowenstein Sandler ====
In July 2017, Milgram joined the law firm of Lowenstein Sandler as special counsel in the tech group and white collar criminal defense practice.

==== Academic career ====
Milgram was a Professor of Practice and Distinguished Scholar in Residence at New York University School of Law. In 2020, as part of her work with the Criminal Justice Lab at New York University School of Law, Milgram worked with the city of Indianapolis.

=== Administrator of the Drug Enforcement Administration ===
On April 22, 2021, President Joe Biden formally nominated Milgram to be Administrator of the Drug Enforcement Administration On May 26, 2021, a hearing on her nomination was held before the Senate Judiciary Committee. She was confirmed by the US Senate by unanimous consent on June 24, 2021, and she was sworn in on June 28 by US Attorney General Merrick B. Garland.

== Personal life ==
Milgram is married and has a son.

Legal offices
Preceded by Zulima Farber	Attorney General of New Jersey; Acting; 2006	Succeeded by Stuart Rabner
Preceded by Stuart Rabner	57th Attorney General of New Jersey; 2007–2010	Succeeded by Paula Dow
Government offices
Preceded by Michele Leonhart; D. Christopher Evans	11th Administrator of the Drug Enforcement Administration; 2021–2025	Succeeded by Terry Cole
