= Peter C. Harvey =

American lawyer

54th New Jersey Attorney General
- In office June 16, 2003 – January 30, 2006
- Governor: Jim McGreevey; Richard Codey
- Preceded by: David Samson
- Succeeded by: Zulima Farber

Personal details
- Party: Democratic
- Education: Morgan State University (BA); Columbia Law School (JD)
- Profession: Lawyer

Peter C. Harvey is an attorney who became the first African American to serve as New Jersey Attorney General. Harvey was appointed by New Jersey governor Jim McGreevey as acting attorney general on February 15, 2003, and was confirmed by the New Jersey Senate as attorney general on June 16, 2003. Harvey served until 2006, when he was succeeded by Zulima Farber. Following his resignation as attorney general, he became a partner in the New York City law office of Patterson, Belknap, Webb, and Tyler.

Harvey was one of the advisers to the National Football League in the league's 2017 personal conduct investigation of Dallas Cowboys running back Ezekiel Elliott. He has been designated by NFL Commissioner Roger Goodell to hear the NFL's appeal of the suspension of Deshaun Watson.

== Biography ==
On January 17, 2002, then-attorney general David Samson appointed Harvey to serve as first assistant attorney general and director of the Division of Criminal Justice, where he served prior to his appointment as attorney general.

Harvey received his J.D. degree in 1982 from Columbia Law School. He received a B.A. in political science from Morgan State University in 1979, where he became a member of Omega Psi Phi fraternity.

Legal offices
Preceded by David Samson	New Jersey Attorney General; June 16, 2003 – January 2006	Succeeded by Zulima Farber
