= New Jersey Office of the Public Defender =

New Jersey government agency

The State of New Jersey Office of the Public Defender

Agency overview
- Formed: July 1, 1967
- Jurisdiction: New Jersey
- Headquarters: 25 Market Street, Trenton, N.J. 08625
- Agency executive: Jennifer N. Sellitti, Public Defender
- Website: http://www.nj.gov/defender/

The New Jersey Office of the Public Defender (OPD) is an agency that is a part of the government of the state of New Jersey, in the United States. The agency provides legal aid to "low income people charged with major crimes." Beyond criminal defense, the agency houses specialized divisions, including the Appellate Unit, Conviction Integrity Unit, the Division of Mental Advocacy, Expungements, Forensic Science, the Intensive Supervision Program (ISP) Unit, the Office of Law Guardian (OLG), the Office of Parental Representation (OPR), the Parole Revocation Defense Unit (PRDU), Recovery Court, and the Special Litigation Unit.

The agency was first established in 1967. In 1974, the agency was incorporated into New Jersey Department of the Public Advocate. With the abolition of the Public Advocate in 1994, the OPD became organized "in but not of" the Department of the Treasury to ensure its independence from the New Jersey Attorney General.

Although the OPD by definition represents low-income defendants, its 1967 enabling legislation required that "in cases where it appears that the defendant has the means to meet some of the cost of services rendered by the public defender, the defendant is required to reimburse the office." This requirement was eliminated in 2023 with the passage of Senate Bill S3771 and its enactment into law.

In December 2023, Jennifer N. Sellitti was appointed to succeed Joseph E. Krakora as the Public Defender, and took office effective February 1, 2024.

== See also ==
- Public defender
