= 2008 New Jersey Republican presidential primary =

- February 5, 2008
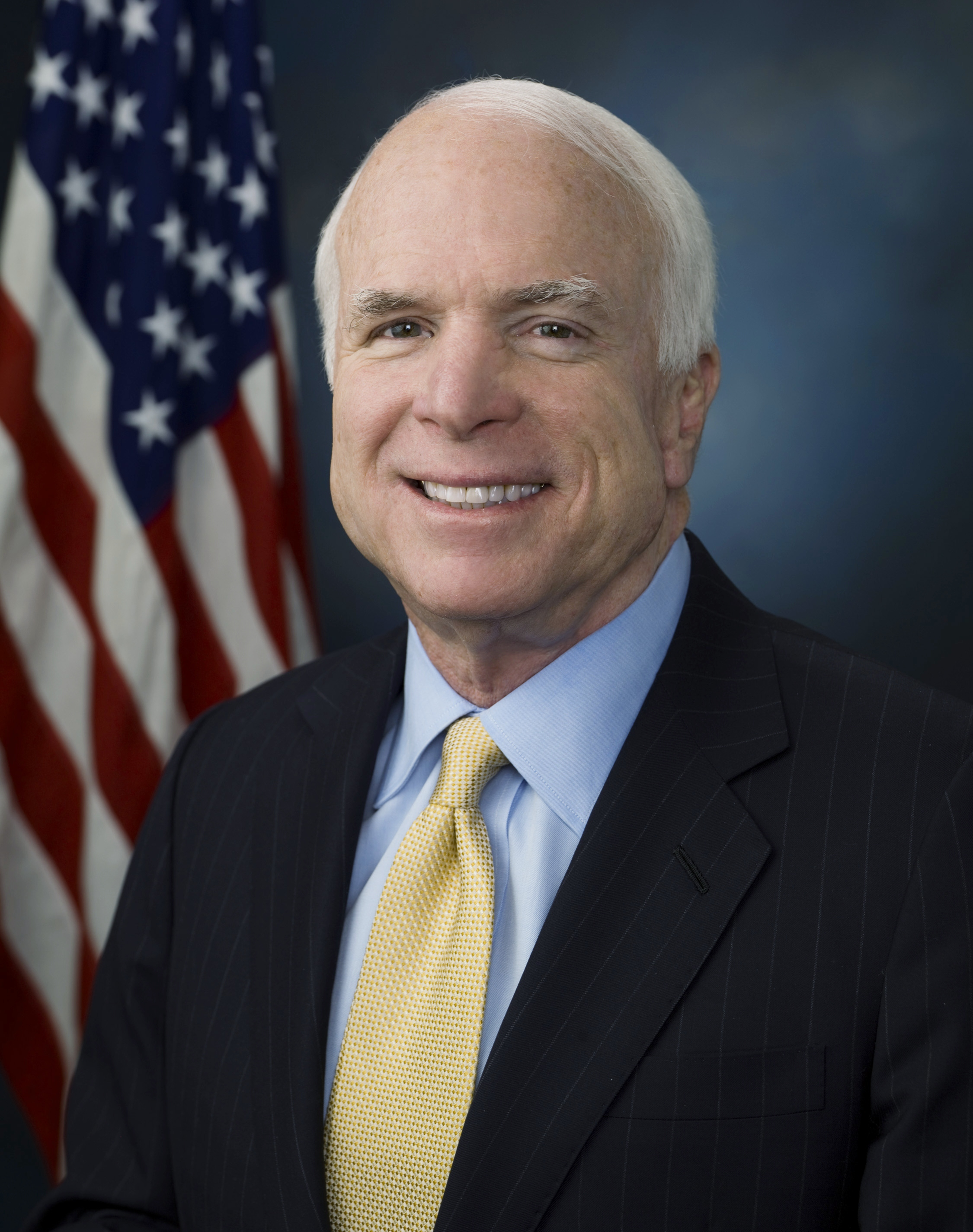

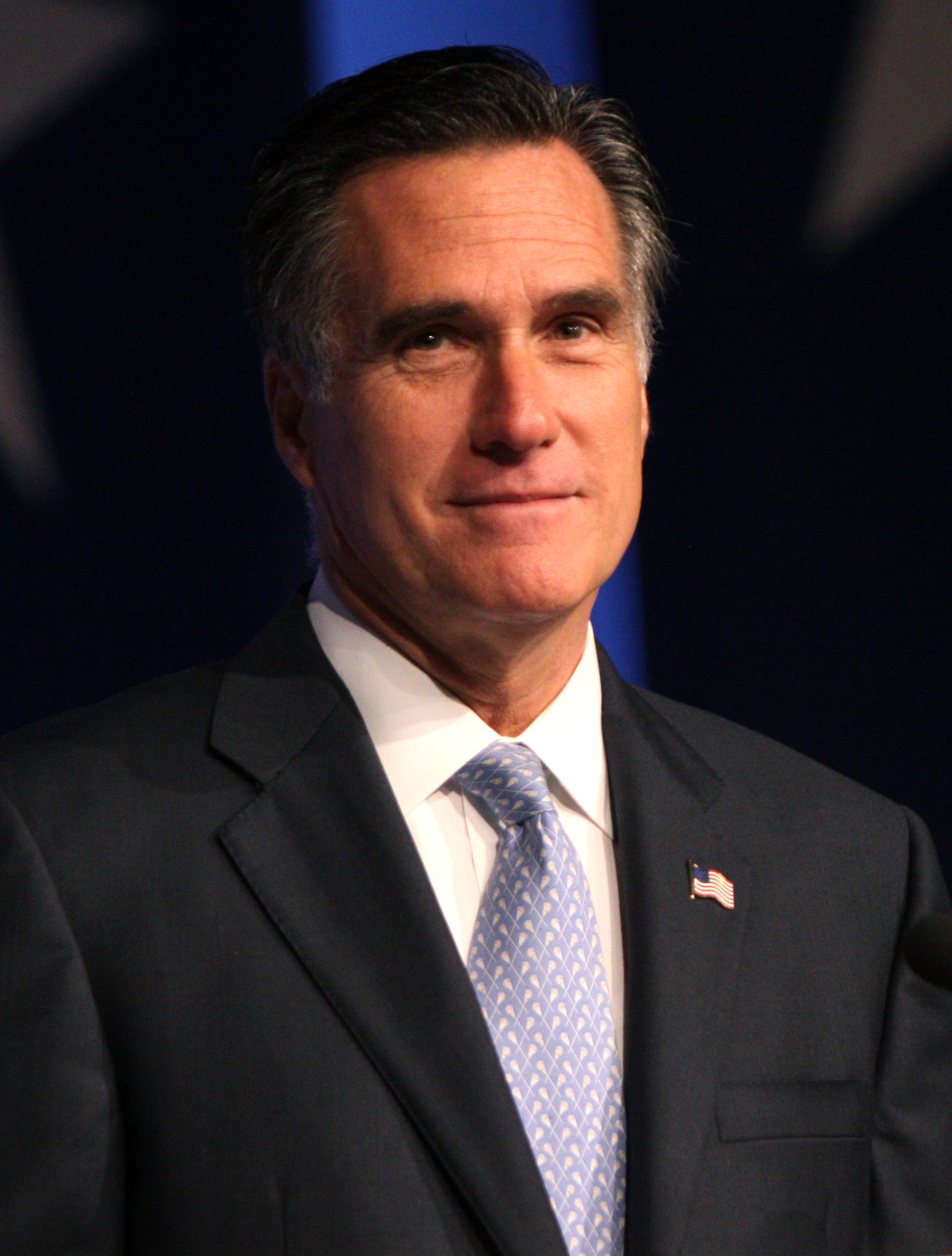

Nominee	John McCain	Mitt Romney	Mike Huckabee
Home state	Arizona	Massachusetts	Arkansas
Delegate count	52	0	0
Popular vote	313,459	160,388	46,284
Percentage	55.36%	28.33%	8.17%
- County results John McCain

The 2008 New Jersey Republican presidential primary took place on February 5, 2008, with 52 national delegates.

Sample ballot for the presidential primary.

== Polling ==
Poll source	Date(s) administered	Sample size	Margin of error	Rudy Giuliani	Mike Huckabee	John McCain	Ron Paul	Mitt Romney	Fred Thompson	Others	Undecided
Result	February 5, 2008			2.6%	8.2%	55.4%	4.8%	28.4%	0.6%	N/A	N/A
Reuters/C-SPAN/Zogby	February 3–4, 2008	862	±3.4%	–	5%	53%	4%	24%	–	4%	10%
Survey USA	February 2–3, 2008	467	±4.6%	–	7%	54%	6%	25	–	3%	6%
Strategic Vision	February 1–3, 2008	600	±4.5%	–	10%	55%	4%	25%	–	–	6%
Quinnipiac University	January 30 – February 3, 2008	350	±5.2%	–	6%	52%	6%	30%	–	1%	5%
McClatchy/MSNBC/Mason Dixon	January 30–February 1, 2008	400	±5.0%	–	5%	46%	4%	31%	–	–	12%
Monmouth University/Gannett	January 30–February 1, 2008	555	±4.0%	–	7%	55%	3%	23%	–	–	12%
Survey USA	January 30–31, 2008	456	±4.7%	–	7%	48%	7%	25%	–	7%	5%
Rasmussen Reports	January 30, 2008	785		–	7%	43%	6%	29%	–	9%	5%
Quinnipiac University	January 15–22, 2008	398	±4.9%	26%	9%	29%	7%	14%	9%	–	4%
Rasmussen Reports	January 15, 2008	616	±4.0%	27%	10%	29%	10%	5%	6%	5%	8%
Monmouth University/Gannett	January 9–13, 2008	400	±4.9%	25%	11%	29%	5%	9%	5%	–	16%
Research 2000/The Record	January 9–10, 2008	400	±5.0%	34%	8%	18%	8%	11%	–	–	17%
Quinnipiac University	December 5–9, 2007	320	±5.5%	38%	8%	12%	2%	7%	4%	4% (Note: "Not voting" with 2%, Duncan Hunter and "other" each with 1%, and Tom Tancredo with 0%.)	23%
Quinnipiac University	October 9–15, 2007			48%	1%	12%	2%	7%	12%	3% (Note: Sam Brownback, Tancredo, and "other" each with 1% and Hunter with 0%.)	13%
Monmouth University/Gannett	September 27–30, 2007			44%	2%	12%	1%	8%	10%	1% (Note: Tancredo with 1% and Brownback and Hunter each with 0%.)	20%
Strategic Vision	September 28–30, 2007			53%	2%	7%	3%	7%	11%	3% (Note: Tancredo with 2% and Hunter with 1%.)	14%
Quinnipiac University	September 18–23, 2007			45%	2%	8%	3%	6%	12%	6% (Note: Newt Gingrich with 4%, "other" with 2%, and Brownback, Hunter and Tancredo each with 0%.)	14%
Strategic Vision	August 24–26, 2007			51%	2%	7%	3%	9%	12%	6% (Note: Gingrich with 3%, Tancredo with 2%, and Hunter with 1%.)	10%
Strategic Vision	July 13–15, 2007			48%	1%	10%	2%	5%	15%	9% (Note: Gingrich with 4%, Tancredo with 2%, and Tommy Thompson, Jim Gilmore, and Duncan Hunter each with 1%.)	10%
Quinnipiac University	June 26–July 2, 2007			46%	1%	11%	1%	7%	9%	9% (Note: Gingrich with 6%, Brownback, Tommy Thompson, and "other" each with 1%, and Gilmore, Hunter and Tancredo each with 0%.)	14%
Strategic Vision	April 25–27, 2007			49%	1%	15%	1%	6%	7%	11% (Note: Gingrich with 4%, Tancredo with 2%, and Gilmore, Chuck Hagel, Hunter, Tommy Thompson and Brownback each with 1%.)	11%
Monmouth University	April 11–16, 2007			49%	1%	19%	–	6%	1% (Note: Voluntarily provided.)	3% (Note: Tommy Thompson with 2%, Brownback with 1%, and Gilmore with 0%.)	21%
American Research Group	March 29–April 2, 2007			38%	0%	23%	0%	8%	8%	3% (Note: George Pataki with 3% and Brownback, Gilmore, Hagel, Hunter, Tommy Thompson and Tancredo each with 0%.)	9%
Quinnipiac University	January 16–22, 2007			39%	1%	21%	–	5%	–	21% (Note: Gingrich with 11%, Pataki and "wouldn't vote" each with 3%, and Brownback, Gilmore, Hunter and "someone else" each with 1%.)	13%

== Results ==
Official Results
Candidate	Votes	Percentage	Delegates
John McCain	313,459	55.36%	52
Mitt Romney	160,388	28.33%	0
Mike Huckabee	46,284	8.17%	0
Ron Paul	27,184	4.06%	0
Rudy Giuliani*	15,516	2.74%	0
Fred Thompson*	3,253	0.57%	0
Total	566,201	100%	52

* Candidate dropped out of the race before the primary

== See also ==
- 2008 New Jersey Democratic presidential primary
- 2008 Republican Party presidential primaries
