= List of justices of the Supreme Court of New Jersey =

== Current justices ==
Name	Born	Joined	Term ends	Mandatory retirement	Party affiliation	Appointed by	Law school
Stuart Rabner, Chief Justice	June 30, 1960 (age 65)	June 29, 2007	– (Note: At the end of their initial seven-year term, the justice was renominated for tenure and was confirmed by the New Jersey Senate to serve until the mandatory retirement age of 70.)	June 30, 2030	Democratic	Jon Corzine (D)	Harvard
Anne M. Patterson	April 15, 1959 (age 66)	September 1, 2011	–	April 15, 2029	Republican	Chris Christie (R)	Cornell
Fabiana Pierre-Louis	September 9, 1980 (age 44)	September 1, 2020	September 1, 2027	September 9, 2050	Democratic	Phil Murphy (D)	Rutgers
Rachel Wainer Apter	July 22, 1980 (age 45)	October 21, 2022	October 21, 2029	July 22, 2050	Democratic	Phil Murphy (D)	Harvard
Douglas M. Fasciale	November 5, 1960 (age 64)	October 21, 2022 (Note: Fasciale served in a temporary appointment from September 1–October 21, 2022)	October 21, 2029	November 5, 2030	Republican	Phil Murphy (D)	Seton Hall
Michael Noriega	March 27, 1978 (age 47)	July 6, 2023	July 6, 2030	March 27, 2048	Democratic	Phil Murphy (D)	Seton Hall
John Jay Hoffman	August 23, 1965 (age 60)	October 2, 2024	October 2, 2031	August 23, 2035	Independent	Phil Murphy (D)	Duke

== List of justices before 1947 ==
Before 1947 and particularly after 1844, the structure of the New Jersey state judiciary was incredibly complex. In some cases, it is not entirely clear whether the following justices served on the Supreme Court of New Jersey (1776–), the New Jersey Court of Common Pleas (1704–1947), or the New Jersey Court of Errors and Appeals (1844–1947).

=== 1776 Constitution ===
Justice	Position	Succeeded	Tenure
Richard Stockton (1730–1781)			1774 – 1776 (Elected to Continental Congress)
John De Hart (1730–1781)			September 4, 1776 – February 1777 (Replaced for failure to attend)
Isaac Smith (1740–1807)			1777 – 1804
Robert Morris (1742–1814)	Chief; Justice		February 5, 1777 – May 25, 1779 (Resigned)
John Cleves Symmes (1742–1814)			1777 – 1778
David Brearley (1745–1790)	Chief; Justice	R. Morris	1779 – September 26, 1789 (Elevated to U.S. District Court)
James Kinsey (1731–1802)	Chief; Justice	D. Brearley	1789 – January 4, 1802 (Died)
Andrew Kirkpatrick (1756–1831)	Justice		1798 – 1808 (Continued as Chief Justice)
Andrew Kirkpatrick (1756–1831)	Chief; Justice	J. Kinsey	1808 – 1825
William Rossell (1760–1840)	Justice		1804 – 1826 (Elevated to U.S. District Court)
William Sanford Pennington (1757–1826)	Justice		1805 – 1813 (Elected Governor of New Jersey)
Mahlon Dickerson (1770–1853)	Justice		1813 – 1815 (Elected Governor of New Jersey)
Samuel L. Southard (1787–1842)		Mahlon Dickerson	1815 – 1820 (Elected to U.S. Senate)
Charles Ewing (1780–1832)	Chief; Justice	A. Kirkpatrick	1825 – August 5, 1832 (Died)
Joseph Coerten Hornblower (1777–1864)	Chief; Justice	C. Ewing	1838 – 1844 (Continued as Chief Justice)
William L. Dayton (1807–1864)	Justice		1838 – 1842 (Appointed to U.S. Senate)

=== 1844 Constitution ===
Justice	Position	Succeeded	Tenure	Appointed by
Joseph Coerten Hornblower (1777–1864)	Chief; Justice		1844 – 1846 (Resigned)	
Joseph Fitz Randolph (1803–1873)	Justice		1845 – 1852 (Resigned)	
Elias B. D. Ogden (1800–1865)	Justice		1848 – February 24, 1865 (Died)	
Garret D. Wall (1783–1850)	Justice		1848 – November 22, 1850 (Died)	
Daniel Haines (1801–1877)	Justice		1852 – 1866	
Lucius Elmer (1793–1883)	Justice		1852 – 1859	
Peter Vrendenburgh (1805–1873)	Justice		1854 – 1868	
Edward W. Whelpley (1818–1864)	Justice		1858 – 1861 (Continued as Chief Justice)	
John Van Dyke (1807–1878)	Justice		1859 – 1866	
Edward W. Whelpley (1818–1864)	Chief; Justice		1861 – 1864	
George Houston Brown (1810–1865)	Justice		1861 – August 1, 1865 (Died)	
Lucius Elmer (1793–1883)	Justice		1861 – 1869	
Mercer Beasley (1815–1897)	Chief; Justice		March 8, 1864 – February 19, 1897 (Died)	
Joseph D. Bedle (1831–1894)	Justice		1865 – January 19, 1875 (Elected Governor of New Jersey)	
Edward W. Scudder (1822–1893)	Justice		1869 – February 3, 1893 (Died)	Theodore Fitz Randolph
Bennett Van Syckel (1830–1921)	Justice		1869 – 1904	
Jonathan Dixon (1839–1906)	Justice		1875 – May 21, 1906 (Died)	Joseph D. Bedle
Alfred Reed	Justice		1875 – 1895	
Joel Parker (1816–1888)	Justice		1880 – January 2, 1888 (Died)	
William J. Magie (1832–1917)	Justice		1880 – 1897 (Continued as Chief Justice)	
Charles G. Garrison (1849–1924)	Justice	J. Parker	1888 – 1893 (Resigned)	
David A. Depue (1826–1902)	Justice		1889 – 1900 (Continued as Chief Justice)	
Manning M. Knapp (1825–1892)	Justice		1889 – January 26, 1892 (Died)	
George Theodore Werts (1846–1910)	Justice	M. Knapp	1892 – January 17, 1893 (Elected Governor of New Jersey)	Leon Abbett
Job H. Lippincott (1842–1900)	Justice	G. T. Werts	1893 – 1900 (Died)	George Theodore Werts
Joseph H. Gaskill (1851–1935)	Justice		1893 – 1896	George Theodore Werts
Leon Abbett (1836–1894)	Justice		1893 – December 4, 1894 (Died)	George Theodore Werts
William Stryker Gummere (1852–1933)	Justice		1895 – November 19, 1901 (Continued as Chief Justice)	George Theodore Werts
George C. Ludlow (1830–1900)	Justice		1895 – December 18, 1900 (Died)	George Theodore Werts
Charles G. Garrison (1849–1924)	Justice		1895 – 1920 (Resigned)	
William H. Vredenburgh	Justice		1897 – 1916	John W. Griggs
Gilbert Collins (1846–1920)	Justice		March 2, 1897 – 1903 (Resigned)	John W. Griggs
William J. Magie (1832–1917)	Chief; Justice	M. Beasley	1897 – 1900 (Elevated to Chancellor of the Court of Errors and Appeals)	John W. Griggs
David A. Depue (c. 1827–1902)	Chief; Justice	W. J. Magie	1900 – 1901 (Resigned)	Foster M. Voorhees
John Franklin Fort (1852–1920)	Justice		1900 – 1907 (Elected Governor of New Jersey)	Foster M. Voorhees
William Stryker Gummere (1852–1933)	Chief; Justice	D. Depue	November 19, 1901 – 1933 (Died)	
Mahlon Pitney (1858–1924)	Justice		November 19, 1901 – 1908	
Thomas Whitaker Trenchard (1863–1942)	Justice		January 15, 1907 – 1941 (Resigned)	
Charles Wolcott Parker (1862–1948)	Justice		1907 – 1942	
James J. Bergen (1847–1923)	Justice		1907 – 1915	
Charles C. Black (1858–1947)	Justice		1914 – 1939	James Fairman Fielder
Frank S. Katzenbach (1868–1929)	Justice		1920 – March 13, 1929 (Died)	Edward I. Edwards
Joseph Lamb Bodine (1883–1950)	Justice		1929 – 1948	
Clarence E. Case (1877–1961)	Justice		1929 – 1946 (Continued as Chief Justice)	
Ralph W. E. Donges (1875–1974)	Justice		1930 – 1948 (Constitution of 1947)	
Thomas J. Brogan (1889–1965)	Justice		1932 – 1933 (Continued as Chief Justice)	
Joseph B. Perskie (1885–1957)	Justice		1933 – 1948 (Constitution of 1947)	
Harry Heher (1889–1972)	Justice		1933 – 1948 (Constitution of 1947)	
Thomas J. Brogan (1889–1965)	Chief; Justice	W. S. Gummere	1933 – 1946 (Resigned)	
Newton Hazelton Porter (1815–1897)	Justice		1938 – 1945	
Frederic R. Colie (1895–1974)	Justice		1941 – 1948 (Constitution of 1947)	
A. Dayton Oliphant (1887–1963)	Justice	N. H. Porter	1945 – 1946	Walter Evans Edge
Clarence E. Case (1877–1961)	Chief; Justice	T. Brogan	1946 – 1948 (Constitution of 1947)	Walter Evans Edge
William A. Wachenfeld (1889–1969)	Justice		1946 – 1948 (Constitution of 1947)	Walter Evans Edge
Howard Eastwood (1884–1976)	Justice		1946 – 1948 (Constitution of 1947)	Walter Evans Edge
Albert E. Burling (1891–1960)	Justice		1947 – 1948 (Constitution of 1947)	Walter Evans Edge

== Supreme Court justices under 1947 Constitution ==
=== List of justices ===
Justice		Position	Succeeded	Tenure	Appointed by
1	Arthur T. Vanderbilt (1888–1957)	Chief; Justice	Inaugural	1948 – June 16, 1957 (Died)	Alfred E. Driscoll
2	Albert E. Burling (1891–1960)	Justice	Inaugural	1948 – October 29, 1960 (Died)	Alfred E. Driscoll
3	Harry Heher (1889–1972)	Justice	Inaugural	1948 – March 20, 1959 (Mandatory retirement)	Alfred E. Driscoll
4	William A. Wachenfeld (1889–1969)	Justice	Inaugural	1948 – February 24, 1959 (Mandatory retirement)	Alfred E. Driscoll
5	A. Dayton Oliphant (1887–1963)	Justice	Inaugural	1948 – October 28, 1957 (Mandatory retirement)	Alfred E. Driscoll
6	Clarence E. Case (1877–1961)	Justice	Inaugural	1948 – 1952 (Resigned)	Alfred E. Driscoll
7	Henry E. Ackerson Jr. (1880–1970)	Justice	Inaugural	1948 – 1952 (Resigned)	Alfred E. Driscoll
8	Nathan L. Jacobs (1905–1989)	Justice	C. Case	1952 – 1975 (Mandatory retirement)	Alfred E. Driscoll
9	William J. Brennan Jr. (1906–1997)	Justice	H. E. Ackerson	1951 – 1956 (Elevated to U.S. Supreme Court)	Alfred E. Driscoll
10	Joseph Weintraub (1908–1977)	Justice	W. J. Brennan	1956 – 1957 (Continued as Chief Justice)	Robert Meyner
10	Joseph Weintraub (1908–1977)	Chief; Justice	A. Vanderbilt	1957 – 1973	Robert Meyner
11	Haydn Proctor (1903–1996)	Justice	A. Oliphant	October 28, 1957 – 1973 (Mandatory retirement)	Robert Meyner
12	John J. Francis (1903–1984)	Justice	J. Weintraub	1957 – 1973 (Mandatory retirement)	Robert Meyner
13	Frederick Wilson Hall (1908–1984)	Justice	W. Wachenfeld	1959 – February 1975 (Resigned)	Robert Meyner
14	C. Thomas Schettino (1907–1983)	Justice	H. Heher	October 1959 – 1972	Robert Meyner
15	Vincent S. Haneman (1902–1978)	Justice	A. Burling	1960 – 1971	Robert Meyner
16	Worrall Frederick Mountain (1909–1992)	Justice	V. Haneman	1971 – 1979	William Cahill
	Pierre P. Garven (1925–1973)	Justice	C. T. Schettino	April 1973 – September 1973 (Continued as Chief Justice)	William Cahill
17	Mark Sullivan (1911–2001)	Justice	J. Francis	March 23, 1973 – August 11, 1981 (Mandatory retirement)	William Cahill
18	Robert L. Clifford (1924–2014)	Justice	P. Garven	1973 – 1994 (Mandatory retirement)	William Cahill
19	Morris Pashman (1912–1999)	Justice	H. Proctor	April 1973 – 1982 (Mandatory retirement)	William Cahill
20	Pierre P. Garven (1925–1973)	Chief; Justice	J. Weintraub	September 1, 1973 – October 19, 1973 (Died)	William Cahill
21	Richard J. Hughes (1909–1992)	Chief; Justice	P. Garven	December 18, 1973 – August 10, 1979 (Mandatory retirement)	William Cahill
22	Sidney Schreiber (1915–2009)	Justice	N. Jacobs	1975 – 1984 (Resigned)	Brendan Byrne
23	Alan B. Handler (1931–2024)	Justice	F. W. Hall	1977 – 1999 (Resigned)	Brendan Byrne
24	Stewart G. Pollock (1932–)	Justice	W. F. Mountain	June 28, 1979 – 1999 (Resigned)	Brendan Byrne
25	Robert Wilentz (1927–1996)	Chief; Justice	R. Hughes	1979 – July 23, 1996 (Died)	Brendan Byrne
26	Daniel Joseph O'Hern (1930–2009)	Justice	M. Sullivan	August 6, 1981 – 2000 (Mandatory retirement)	Brendan Byrne
27	Marie L. Garibaldi (1934–2016)	Justice	M. Pashman	November 17, 1982 – 2000 (Resigned)	Thomas Kean
28	Gary S. Stein (1933–)	Justice	S. Schreiber	January 11, 1985 – 2002 (Resigned)	Thomas Kean
29	James H. Coleman (1933–2024)	Justice	R. Clifford	1994 – 2003	Christine Todd Whitman
30	Deborah Poritz (1936–)	Chief; Justice	R. Wilentz	July 10, 1996 – October 25, 2006 (Mandatory retirement)	Christine Todd Whitman
31	Peter Verniero (1959–)	Justice	S. Pollock	1999 – 2004 (Resigned)	Christine Todd Whitman
32	Virginia Long (1942–)	Justice	A. Handler	September 1, 1999 – March 1, 2012 (Mandatory retirement)	Christine Todd Whitman
33	James R. Zazzali (1937–)	Justice	D. J. O'Hern	May 25, 2000 – October 26, 2006 (Continued as Chief Justice)	Christine Todd Whitman
34	Jaynee LaVecchia (1954–)	Justice	M. Garibaldi	February 1, 2000 – December 31, 2021 (Retired)	Christine Todd Whitman
35	Barry T. Albin (born 1952)	Justice	G. Stein	September 18, 2002 – July 6, 2022 (Retired)	James McGreevey
36	John E. Wallace Jr. (1953–)	Justice	J. Coleman	May 20, 2003 – May 20, 2010 (Not re-nominated)	James McGreevey
37	Roberto A. Rivera-Soto (1953–)	Justice	P. Verniero	September 1, 2004 – August 31, 2011 (Not re-nominated)	James McGreevey
33	James R. Zazzali (1937–)	Chief; Justice	D. Poritz	October 26, 2006 – June 17, 2007 (Mandatory retirement)	Jon Corzine
38	Helen E. Hoens (1937–)	Justice	J. Zazzalli	October 26, 2006 – October 26, 2013 (Not re-nominated)	Jon Corzine
39	Stuart Rabner (born 1960)	Chief; Justice	J. Zazzali	June 29, 2007 – Incumbent	Jon Corzine
40	Anne Patterson (born 1959)	Justice	R. Rivera-Soto	September 1, 2011 – Incumbent	Chris Christie
41	Faustino J. Fernandez-Vina (1952–)	Justice	H. Hoens	November 19, 2013 – February 15, 2022 (Mandatory retirement)	Chris Christie
42	Lee Solomon (born 1954)	Justice	V. Long	June 19, 2014 – August 17, 2024 (Mandatory retirement)	Chris Christie
43	Walter F. Timpone (1950–)	Justice	J. Wallace (2011)	May 2, 2016 – August 31, 2020	Chris Christie
44	Fabiana Pierre-Louis (1980–)	Justice	W. Timpone	September 1, 2020 – Incumbent	Phil Murphy
45	Douglas M. Fasciale (1960–)	Justice	F. Fernandez-Vina	September 1, 2022 – Incumbent	Phil Murphy
46	Rachel Wainer Apter (1980/1981–)	Justice	J. LaVecchia	October 21, 2022 – Incumbent	Phil Murphy
47	Michael Noriega (1977/1978–)	Justice	B. Albin	July 6, 2023 – Incumbent	Phil Murphy
48	John Jay Hoffman (1965–)	Justice	L. Solomon	Designate	Phil Murphy

=== Acting justices ===
==== Wallace vacancy ====
On May 3, 2010, Governor Chris Christie declined to re-nominate John E. Wallace Jr., whose seven-year term expired on May 20, 2010. He was the first Justice of the Supreme Court to be denied tenure in more than a half-century since the adoption of the Constitution of New Jersey in 1947. To fill the vacancy Chief Justice Stuart Rabner appointed a number of acting judges (known as Judge of the Appellate Division, Temporarily Assigned to the Supreme Court) during an extended period of controversy and conflict with the New Jersey Senate about the court's political composition.

- Mary Catherine Cuff
- Ariel A. Rodriguez
- Edwin Stern
- Dorothea O'C. Wefing

==== LaVecchia/Albin/Fernandez-Vina vacancies ====
On March 8, 2021, Justice Jaynee LaVecchia announced that she would retire on August 31, 2021, more than three years before her mandatory retirement date. A week later, Governor Phil Murphy announced his intention to nominate Rachel Wainer Apter, the director of the New Jersey Division of Civil Rights, to replace LaVecchia. Apter was blocked for 14 months by Republican Senator Holly Schepisi by a process called senatorial consent (similar to the blue slip process for federal judgeships), and was only allowed to move forward after two more justices, Barry T. Albin and Faustino J. Fernandez-Vina, had reached retirement age in the interim and Gov. Murphy nominated Republican Douglas M. Fasciale to succeed Fernandez-Vina. Both Apter and Fasciale were confirmed on October 17, 2022. Additionally, Michael Noriega was nominated and confirmed in 2023 to succeed Albin.

LaVecchia vacancy:

- Jose L. Fuentes
- Clarkson S. Fisher, Jr.

Albin vacancy:

- Jack M. Sabatino

Fernandez-Vina vacancy:

- Douglas M. Fasciale

== See also ==
- Judiciary of New Jersey
- Courts of New Jersey
