= Henningsen v. Bloomfield Motors, Inc. =

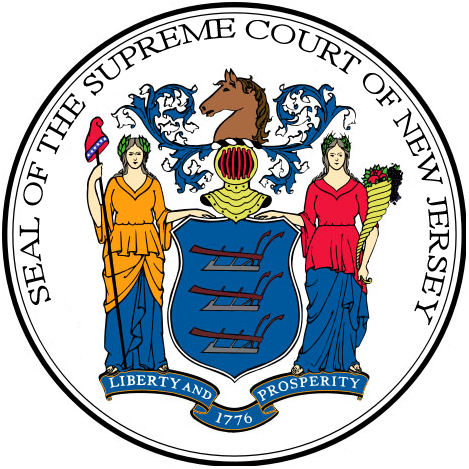
- Court: Supreme Court of New Jersey
- Full case name: Claus H. Henningsen and Helen Henningsen, Plaintiffs-Respondents and Cross-Appellants, v. Bloomfield Motors, Inc., and Chrysler Corporation, Defendants-Appellants, and Cross-Respondents
- Argued: December 7, 1959
- Decided: May 9, 1960
- Citations: 32 N.J. 358; 161 A.2d 69

Holding
- An automobile manufacturer may not use an express warranty to disclaim an implied warranty of merchantability.

Court membership
- Chief Justice: Joseph Weintraub
- Associate Justices: Albert E. Burling, Nathan L. Jacobs, Haydn Proctor, John J. Francis, Thomas C. Schettino, Fredrick W. Hall,

Case opinions
- Majority: Francis, joined by unanimous

In Henningsen v. Bloomfield Motors, Inc., 32 N.J. 358, 161 A.2d 69 (N.J. 1960), the New Jersey Supreme Court held that an automobile manufacturer's attempt to use an express warranty that disclaimed an implied warranty of merchantability was invalid.

== Facts ==
On May 7, 1955, Mr. Claus H. Henningsen purchased a Plymouth automobile, manufactured by Chrysler Corporation, from Bloomfield Motors, Inc. The automobile was intended as a Mother's Day gift to his wife, Helen, and the purchase was executed solely by Mr. Henningsen.

The contract for sale was a one-page form and contained paragraphs in various type sizes on the front and back of the form. Mr. Henningsen testified he did not read all paragraphs of the contract. The back of the contract contained the following clause:

The manufacturer warrants each new motor vehicle (including original equipment placed thereon by the manufacturer except tires), chassis or parts manufactured by it to be free from defects in material or workmanship under normal use and service. Its obligation under this warranty being limited to making good at its factory any part or parts thereof which shall, within ninety (90) days after delivery of such vehicle to the original purchaser or before such vehicle has been driven 4,000 miles, whichever event shall first occur, be returned to it with transportation charges prepaid and which its examination shall disclose to its satisfaction to have been thus defective; This warranty being expressly in lieu of all other warranties expressed or implied, and all other obligations or liabilities on its part, and it neither assumes nor authorizes any other person to assume for it any other liability in connection with the sale of its vehicles.

The car was delivered on May 9, 1955. There were no problems with the car until May 19, 1955. On that day, Mrs. Henningsen was driving the car at 20-22 mph on a smooth two lane highway. Mrs. Henningsen then heard a loud noise, the steering wheel spun in her hands, and the car suddenly veered and collided with a wall. The car was damaged severely, and declared totaled by the Henningsens' insurance carrier.

The defendants refused to repair the car under warranty since they claimed the express warranty was limited only to repairing the defective parts and that it was not liable for damages caused by defective parts.

== Procedure ==
Mr. and Mrs. Henningsen sued under a theory of negligence and a theory of warranty. The court felt the proof was not sufficient to make out a prima facie case of negligence and gave the case to the jury solely on the warranty theory. The jury returned a verdict for the plaintiffs, Mr. and Mrs. Henningsen, against both defendants. The appellate case was argued on December 7, 1959 and was decided on May 9, 1960.

== Holding ==
Automobile purchasers may recover for damages caused by defective parts under an implied warranty of merchantability since automobile manufacturers and dealers may not limit this warranty to replacement of only defective parts as this violates fair dealing and public policy.

== Reasoning ==
The court rejected Chrysler's argument that the law required privity of contract and therefore foreclosed consumers from seeking to hold liable automobile manufactures where a consumers had purchased the vehicle from an automobile retailer. The court explained that the common law rule requiring privity stemmed from the pre-modern nature of markets, where buyers typically purchased directly from the maker. While the court recognized that a majority of states still followed the rule requiring privity, it pointed to the developing trend away from the common law rule due to the changing nature of modern markets, wherein direct sales were no longer as common, as a sufficient basis for it to depart from the common law rule. The court viewed as unjust scenarios where manufacturers could advertise and profit from claims of product suitability but then escape liability where those claims proved untrue. In the court's view, the manufacturer's advertisements of product suitability represented an implied warranty to consumers, and that warranty accompanied every car the manufacturer put into the stream of trade.

The court then turned to the contract between Bloomfield Motors and Mr. Henningsen. The court reiterated that the public policy of New Jersey attached an implied warranty of merchantability to the sale of all goods. While the state's Uniform Sales Act allowed for buyers and sellers to negotiate and vary the terms of a contract, that statutory allowance was in no way intended to permit seller abuse of disproportionate bargaining power to obtain from purchasers any waiver of the implied warranty of merchantability. Because Chrysler had compelled Bloomfield Motors to use a standardized form contract and forbade dealers from altering or consenting to any alteration to the contract's terms, and because Bloomfield Motors had acquiesced to that contract's use in selling to Henningsen, the court determined the manufacturer and dealer had unfairly obtained the disclaimer from Henningsen. Consequently, the disclaimer contained in the contract could not apply, and the implied warranty therefore stood.

== Commentary ==
Some law and economics scholars have criticized this result as it will ultimately raise prices as automobile manufacturers and dealers have to pay for implied warranty costs. This results in an economically inefficient transaction since not all consumers wanted this warranty, but now all consumers are forced to pay for it.

New Jersey courts, attorneys and scholars frequently cite Henningsen as the landmark case that established strict liability for defective products in the United States. However, the majority of US courts, attorneys, and law professors usually cite Escola v. Coca-Cola Bottling Co. and the Supreme Court of California as the source of the doctrine.

Although Henningsen helped articulate the rationale for the then-imminent shift from implied warranty to strict liability as the dominant theory of American product liability, the case never actually imposes "strict liability" or "absolute liability" for defective products.
