= Hedgepeth and Williams v. Board of Education =

1944 New Jersey Supreme Court case

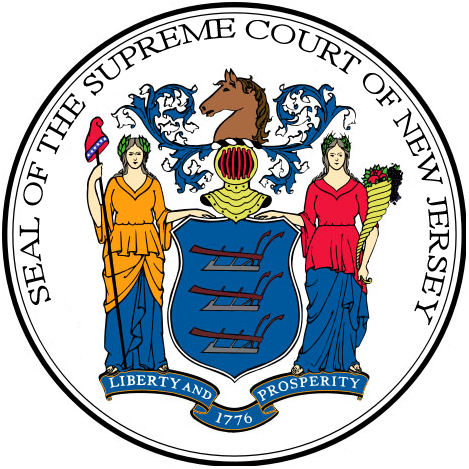
- Court: Supreme Court of New Jersey
- Full case name: Gladys Hedgepeth, Relator, v. Board of Education of the City of Trenton, Respondent; Berline Williams, Relator, v. Board of Education of the City of Trenton, Respondent.
- Decided: January 31, 1944
- Citations: 35 A.2d 622; 131 N.J.L. 153

Holding
- Racial segregation of public schools violates state law.

Court membership
- Chief Justice: Thomas J. Brogan
- Associate Justices: Joseph L. Bodine, Clarence E. Case, Ralph W. E. Donges, Harry Heher, Newton H. Porter, Frederic R. Colie

Case opinions
- Majority: Porter, joined by unanimous

Hedgepeth and Williams v. Board of Education, Trenton, NJ, 131 N.J.L. 153, 35 A.2d 622 (1944), also known as the Hedgepeth–Williams case, was a landmark New Jersey Supreme Court decision decided in 1944. The Court ruled that since racial segregation was outlawed by the New Jersey State Constitution, it was unlawful for schools to segregate or refuse admission to students on the basis of race. The case led to the formal desegregation of New Jersey public schools and was a precursor to Brown v. Board of Education.

== Background ==
Segregation in New Jersey was not officially codified into state law. In contrast, the New Jersey State Constitution was amended to outlaw racially motivated discrimination or segregation in public schools. However, as was common for many states in the North, the 19th and early 20th centuries saw the proliferation of Jim Crow laws and "separate but equal" facilities throughout the state. Schools in particular had been segregated as early as 1901.

=== Trenton Public School District ===
In the 1940s, the city of Trenton saw more racial diversity, with African-Americans comprising roughly 12,000 of its 130,000 residents. Despite this, only one school in the city's school district (the Trenton Central High School) was fully integrated, largely owing to it being the sole high school in the district. Even after the passage of the 1881 amendment outlawing school segregation, the Trenton Board of Education continued establishing and operating segregated public schools. One such school was the Bellevue Avenue Colored School, opened in 1883 and later renamed the Lincoln School, which enrolled black students up to ninth grade. However, the building was too small for its student population and quickly deteriorated.

In 1923, the district opened the New Lincoln School as a replacement for the original Lincoln School. While it was not explicitly labeled a "colored" school, the Board of Education adopted an internal policy to assign all eligible black students to the institution, to the extent that black students were transferred to the New Lincoln School from other junior high schools. By contrast, white and East Asian students were assigned to elementary and junior high schools based on where they lived. The elementary schools were not strictly segregated, as elementary-aged children who were assigned to the New Lincoln School could be transferred elsewhere at their parents' request, but there was no option for junior high school students to transfer: even though the district maintained four other junior high schools, they almost never enrolled African-American students. This resulted in de facto segregation of the student body.

Much like other segregated facilities, the New Lincoln School was unequal to Trenton's integrated or all-white schools. By 1943, however, New Lincoln was in worse condition than its predecessor. It was heavily overcrowded, with 2,000 students between kindergarten and sixth grade, at least 456 students between seventh and ninth grade, (Note: There are conflicting reports as to the number of junior high school students. The Associated Press placed the junior high enrollment at 456 students, while the New York Age reported 546 students.) and only one principal overseeing all grades. Insufficient space forced some junior high students to attend classes in laboratory rooms rather than dedicated classrooms, and there were few vocational or commercial courses available. The playground was described as "unsanitary". A significant number of students lacked transportation and were faced with long walks, even in bad weather.

=== Families ===
The plaintiffs in Hedgepeth-Williams were 12-year-olds Janet Hedgepeth and Leon Williams, represented by their respective mothers—Gladys Hedgepeth and Berline Williams. All four plaintiffs and their families were African-American residents of Trenton's Wilbur district. The Hedgepeth family lived in a house on Walnut Street, while the Williams family resided in a row house on Parker Avenue. Though Leon and Janet did not know each other before the case, Berline and Gladys were both members of the Trenton NAACP.

From kindergarten until sixth grade, Leon attended the William G. Cook elementary school, while Janet attended the Carrol Robbins elementary school. Despite both schools being racially integrated, the children were reportedly the only African-American students in their classes. The Williams were reportedly aware of the de facto segregation of junior high students, as Leon's older sisters had attended New Lincoln for junior high school.

== Facts of the case ==
In 1943, after Leon and Janet completed sixth grade, the two students were assigned to attend the New Lincoln School. Both the children and their mothers were unhappy with the placement: Leon and Janet would have to walk to the New Lincoln School, which was over 2 1/2 miles away from their neighborhood, and Janet was disappointed by the school's lack of commercial class. Junior High No. 2 had a commercial class and was significantly closer, being only three blocks away from the Williams' residence. However, the student body was mostly white, as the school had allegedly never admitted a black student.

In August, Berline Williams requested to transfer her son to Junior High No. 2, but was denied by the principal, who claimed the school was "not built for Negroes"—a claim later repeated to Gladys Hedgepeth. Williams and Hedgepeth both took to the Board of Education, where they were told by superintendent Paul Loser that the children would need to attend the New Lincoln School until the transfer requests were processed. However, when the school year began on September 13, the transfer requests remained unprocessed. When Williams and Hedgepeth asked Loser about the transfer requests, they were told that even though the Board had held a meeting on September 2, they had taken "no action" on them.

By September 16, both mothers had filed independent lawsuits against the Trenton Board of Education, alleging racial discrimination. Hedgepeth was allegedly the first to file suit; Williams, initially hesitant, was encouraged by Hedgepeth and several other members of the Trenton NAACP. Both plaintiffs were represented by attorney Robert Queen, a key member of the local NAACP who had been instrumental in desegregating the pool at Trenton Central High School in 1932. Queen, when questioning the school board about the decision, was informed that segregating the junior high school students had been "custom" for 20 years.

== Lawsuit ==
=== Denial by district court and appeal to state Supreme Court ===
Hedgepeth, Williams, and Queen first took the suit to the Trenton District Court, where the case was declined. Queen promptly appealed the decision to the New Jersey Supreme Court, which agreed to take the case. (Note: At the time, the New Jersey Supreme Court was the second appellate court, and was not yet considered the highest-level court of the state.)

=== Arguments ===
The case was presented to the New Jersey Supreme Court on October 26, 1943. The Trenton Public School District was initially represented by Harvey Knight, but was later represented by board member Henry M. Hartmann. Among the Court were Justice Newton Hazelton Porter and Supreme Court Commissioner Marvin A. Spaulding. Several members of the school board testified in court, including superintendent Paul Loser, board secretary Robert Bellville, and Hartmann.

Queen argued that denying Leon and Janet the opportunity to attend Junior High No. 2 was in violation of the New Jersey State Constitution, which forbade segregating students by race. The New Lincoln School, he pointed out, had no established zoning boundaries and enrolled students on the basis of race, whereas Junior High No. 2 enrolled students based on whether students lived inside established zoning boundaries. (Both Leon and Janet resided within Junior High No. 2's boundaries.) Queen cited the rulings in Pierce v. Union District School Trustees (46 N.J.L. 76, 1884) and Raison v. Board of Education of the Township of Berkeley (103 N.J.L 547, 1927) as precedent for the case.

Bellville testified that while the board had met on September 2, they had not discussed the families' transfer requests, which was reflected in the meeting minutes. Loser testified that it was the internal policy to assign all black students to New Lincoln, as they believed it was in the students' "best interest." He further argued that black students were likely to segregate themselves of their own accord, and claimed that segregated students would have "better leadership opportunities" than integrated ones: Loser alleged that in integrated schools, black children had about a 1 in 25 chance of being selected as class officers or being selected for teams, which would not happen in segregated schools. When Queen asked if Loser found it better to segregate white students on the basis of nationality, Loser answered that he had not thought about it; however, his addition that these groups were "less likely to segregate" indicated racial bias, showing that Loser's belief only applied to black students. Additionally, Loser denied that there were any differences in the facilities of the New Lincoln School and other junior high schools in the district.

When Hartmann testified before the court, he repeated much of Loser's claims, adding that the district's elementary schools were not racially segregated. He stated that some white children voluntarily walked much further distances, though Queen pointed out these children did so to avoid attending racially integrated schools. Hartmann also alleged that the case had not followed proper procedure, claiming that the plaintiffs should have first gone to the State Education Commissioner and the State Board of Education.

== Court's decision ==
The New Jersey Supreme Court unanimously ruled in favor of Hedgepeth and Williams on January 31, 1944. As the district had been unable to show cause for denying the plaintiffs' transfer requests, the Court declared the district in violation of N.J.S.A. 18:14-2, which prohibits public schools from turning away black students. In an opinion penned by Justice Porter, the Court stated:

The sole question presented is the legal right of the respondent to refuse these children admission in the school nearest their residences. The only reason the admission sought is denied them is because of their race. We think it clear that the children were unlawfully discriminated against. It is unlawful for Boards of Education to exclude children from any public school on the ground that they are of the negro race.

As part of the court ruling, Junior High No. 2 was ordered to enroll Leon and Janet.

== Impact ==
Hedgepeth-Williams was an early step towards the desegregation of New Jersey and the passage of statewide antidiscrimination laws. The Trenton Public School District began integrating soon after the decision; by 1946, the New Lincoln School had been renamed to Junior High No. 5, and the faculty and student body at all schools were integrated. However, racial bias significantly slowed the process. Children already enrolled in the New Lincoln School typically remained there, forcing parents to file transfer requests; additionally, Loser approved all transfer requests from white students who had been transferred to Junior High No. 5 and wanted to be transferred elsewhere. Integration became more proactive after the New Jersey Supreme Court case Booker v. Plainfield (45 N.J. 161 1965), which ruled that schools could not use any rationale to segregate students due to the resulting psychological harm.

A decade later, during the U.S. Supreme Court case Brown v. Board of Education, attorney Thurgood Marshall wrote to Queen while forming his arguments for the case. Marshall would later cite Hedgepeth-Williams as precedent for desegregation.

Leon and Janet both attended Junior High No. 2, as did their younger siblings in later years. Some of Leon's younger siblings, inspired by the efforts of their mother, would serve influential roles in Trenton: Leon's younger brother Ernest would become the first black Chief of Police in Trenton, and his younger sister Thelma went on to work in the Trenton Public School District.

In the early 1990s, Junior High No. 2 was renamed Hedgepeth-Williams Middle School.

In the decades following the decision, many white families left Trenton, causing the city to become significantly more segregated. New Jersey continues to struggle with segregation, which affects schools across the state (including Hedgepeth-Williams Middle School).

== See also ==
- Education segregation in New Jersey
- Clark v. Board of School Directors, 1868 Iowa Supreme Court case outlawing school segregation

== Sources ==
- Marcellus D. Smith, Jr. "The Importance of Hedgepeth and Williams v. Board of Education, Trenton, NJ (1944)". Trenton Public Schools. Archived from the original on May 3, 2009.
- Napoleon-Smith, T. "About Us | Hedgepeth-Williams Middle School". Trenton Public Schools. Archived from the original on February 25, 2019.
