= State v. Driver =

New Jersey Supreme Court case

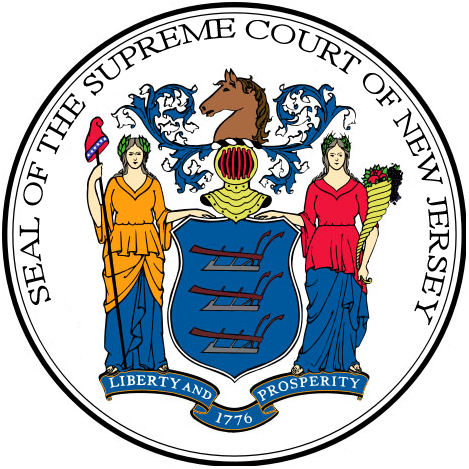
- Court: Supreme Court of New Jersey
- Full case name: The State of New Jersey, Respondent, v. Reginald O. Driver, Jr., Defendant-Appellant
- Argued: April 23, 1962
- Decided: July 19, 1962

Holding
- References by a prosecutor to a defendant's failure to take a lie detector test and the introduction of mostly unintelligble recorded interrogations into evidence are invalid.

Court membership
- Chief Justice: Joseph Weintraub
- Associate Justices: Nathan L. Jacobs, John J. Francis, Haydn Proctor, Fredrick W. Hall, Thomas C. Schettino, Vincent S. Haneman

Case opinions
- Majority: Francis, joined by unanimous

State v. Driver 38 N.J. 255 (1962) is a New Jersey Supreme Court case governing the admissibility of recorded interrogations in a criminal trial. The test articulated in Driver has been adopted by several other states, and is also followed in by the U.S. federal court system.

== Background ==
Jacob Mayer was the manager of an A&P Supermarket in Hamilton Township, New Jersey. On April 4 Mayer left the store to go home at 10:30pm. From her bed his wife heard him talking to some people, before seeing car lights leaving their driveway. Her husband had not returned by 2:30pm and the police were called. The next morning police found that $10,468.21 in cash and $505.17 in checks had been taken from the supermarket's safe. At 7am a burned Dodge coupe was found between Carnegie Lake and the Delaware and Raritan Canal in Princeton Township, although police were not notified until the next day. The body of Mayer was found in the canal. There was a laceration on the scalp and adhesive tape around his wrists, mouth, eyes, nose and neck. It was determined that he had died of strangulation. Reginald Driver was charged with murder on December 11, 1959. The trial began on May 15, 1961.

Driver was convicted of murder and sentenced to life imprisonment on June 2. The conviction was overturned 14 months later, following an appeal over the methods in which a taped confession was obtained.

== Driver hearing ==
The Court overturned Driver's murder conviction because the taped recording played for the jury was so garbled and unclear that the trial judge instructed the jury, "[i]f you can't hear it, you can't hear it. Inaudible."

This court decision led to the introduction of the Driver hearing in New Jersey. It states that any sound recording offered into evidence at trial must be competent and relevant. In resolving such disputed questions, the court should determine that the speakers on the recording are identified, and that:

1. the device was capable of taking the conversation or statement;
2. its operator was competent;
3. the recording is authentic and correct;
4. no changes, additions or deletions have been made; and
5. the statements, if confessions, are voluntary.

The court also instructed that trial judges "should listen to the recording out of the presence of the jury before allowing it to be used" in order to determine that the recording is "sufficiently audible, intelligible, not obviously fragmented, and... whether it contains any improper and prejudicial matter which ought to be deleted."

== Other jurisdictions ==
The New Jersey Driver approach has generally been adopted by the courts of several other states, including Montana, New Mexico, New York, North Carolina, Washington, and West Virginia.

The federal court system uses an approach that is nearly identical to the Driver test, although the ordering and wording of the particular elements are different, and vary from circuit to circuit.
