= State v. Abbott =

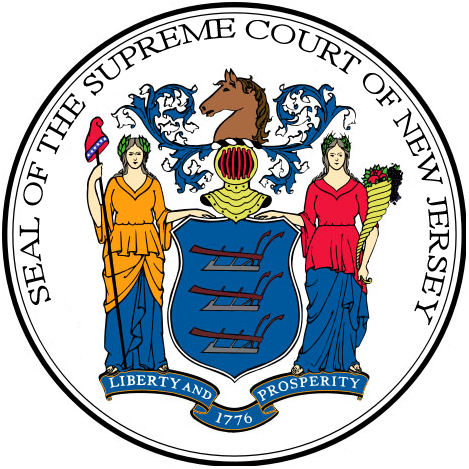
- Court: New Jersey Supreme Court
- Full case name: State of New Jersey, Plaintiff-Respondent, v. Frank Abbott, Defendant-Appellant
- Argued: September 13, 1961
- Decided: November 6, 1961
- Citations: 36 N.J. 63; 174 A.2d 881

Case history
- Prior actions: State v. Abbott, 64 N.J. Super. 191, 165 A.2d 537 (Super. Ct. App. Div. 1960); 34 N.J. 176, 167 A.2d 676 (1961)

Court membership
- Chief judge: Joseph Weintraub
- Associate judges: Nathan L. Jacobs, John J. Francis, Haydn Proctor, Frederick Wilson Hall, C. Thomas Schettino, Vincent S. Haneman

Case opinions
- Decision by: Weintraub

Keywords
- Self-defense; duty to retreat

State v. Abbott, 36 N.J. 63, 174 A.2d 881 (1961), is a landmark case in the American legal doctrine of retreat. In it, the New Jersey Supreme Court unanimously adopted a duty to retreat—a legal requirement that a threatened person cannot stand one's ground and apply lethal force in self-defense, but must instead retreat to a place of safety. This retreat rule is an exception to the right of self-defense.

The duty to retreat, as endorsed in Abbott, is in direct opposition to the “true man” doctrine articulated in Erwin v. State, 29 Ohio St. 186 (1876). This common law view holds the law “will not permit the taking of [human life] to repel mere trespass, . . . but a true man who is without fault is not obliged to fly from an assailant.”

Most states at the time of Abbott followed the no-retreat “true man” approach; since Abbott, it has been in major flux.

== Facts and procedural history ==
Frank Abbott shared a common driveway with the Scarano family. When the Scaranos hired a contractor to pave their portion of the driveway, Abbott purchased some excess asphalt with which to create a doorstop for his garage door. Nicholas Scarano, the son of Michael and Mary Scarano, objected to the doorstop and attacked Abbott with his fists. Abbott punched Nicholas Scarano, knocking him to the ground. At that point, Michael Scarano attacked Abbott with a hatchet, and Mary Scarano attacked him with kitchen utensils. While each of the parties involved in the altercation provided different accounts of what happened, the result was that all of the Scaranos were injured by the hatchet. Abbott also claimed to have been lacerated.

Frank Abbott was separately indicted for atrocious assault and battery upon each of the Scaranos. After a common trial, Abbot was acquitted by the jury of the charges relating to Michael and Mary but was found guilty as to Nicholas.

== Court decision ==
The Court framed the issue as "whether the trial court properly instructed the jury upon the issue of self-defense." In particular, Abbott disputed the trial judge's statement of the conditions under which an obligation to retreat would arise.

The Court first outlined the arguments for and against imposition of a duty to retreat, noting that the question has divided the authorities. Opponents of a retreat rule argue that the law "should not denounce conduct as criminal when it accords with the behavior of reasonable men." As the argument goes, "the manly thing is to hold one's ground and hence society should not demand what smacks of cowardice." On the other hand, proponents of a duty to retreat hold that "it is better that the assailed shall retreat than that the life of another be needlessly spent." Furthermore, advocates of retreat argue that "not only do right-thinking men agree, but further a rule so requiring may well induce others to adhere to that worthy standard of behavior."

The Court then considered precedent and persuasive authority. It recognized that there was much dispute in the ancient precedents of common law on the question, so it opted against considering them. The Court then stated that while sister jurisdictions are split on the question, the majority view rejected the duty to retreat in favor of the true man doctrine. Finally, the Court acknowledged that the Model Penal Code embraced the retreat rule.

Ultimately, the Court held that New Jersey would require a duty to retreat, outlining three principles underlying the duty. First, "[t]he issue of retreat arises only if the defendant resorted to a deadly force. It is deadly force which is not justifiable when an opportunity to retreat is at hand." Accordingly, a person may stand their ground and defend themselves, as long as they do not resort to deadly force. The Court endorsed the Model Penal Code's definition of "deadly force": "force which the actor uses with the purpose of causing or which he knows to create a substantial risk of causing death or serious bodily harm."

The second principle underlying the Court's formulation of the duty to retreat is that "deadly force is not justifiable if the actor knows that he can avoid the necessity of using such force with complete safety by retreating." The Court took special care to note that this is a question to be determined by a totality of the circumstances inquiry.

The third and final principle concerns the burden of proof with respect to self-defense. The Court found that, if the duty to retreat is raised in response to a claim of self-defense, "the jury should be instructed that the burden is also the State's to prove beyond a reasonable doubt that defendant knew he could have retreated with complete safety, and that if a reasonable doubt upon that question should exist, the issue of retreat must be resolved in defendant's favor."

Upon finding a duty to retreat in New Jersey and explaining the underlying principles, the Court held that the duty arises in cases involving homicides, assault with intent to kill, and atrocious assault and battery—the charge at issue in Abbott.

After this discussion of the law, the Court held that the jury instructions issued by the trial court was improper. The Court then considered other grounds upon which Abbott appealed, before reversing the judgment and remanding the matter for further proceedings.
