= Joseph H. Gaskill =

American judge (1851–1935)

Joseph H. Gaskill (May 23, 1851 – November 25, 1935) was a judge on the New Jersey Court of Common Pleas and justice of the New Jersey Supreme Court from 1893 to 1896.

His sons Thomas L. Gaskill and Nelson B. Gaskill were also lawyers.

Gaskill was a native of Mount Holly and later resided in Moorestown. He died of a heart ailment in his home in Moorestown at the age of 85, and was interred in Mount Holly Cemetery.

== See also ==
- List of justices of the Supreme Court of New Jersey
- New Jersey Court of Errors and Appeals
- Courts of New Jersey
