= Charles G. Garrison =

American judge (1849–1924)

Charles Grant Garrison (August 3, 1849 – April 22, 1924) was a physician, lawyer, and judge from New Jersey.

Garrison was born in Swedesboro, New Jersey, on August 3, 1849, the son of Rev. Joseph Fithian Garrison and Elizabeth Vanarsdale (Grant) Garrison. His brother was Lindley Miller Garrison, who served as Secretary of State. He married Anna Hoffman Miller on March 4, 1880.

Garrison attended Edgehill School in Princeton and the Episcopal Academy in Philadelphia. He entered the University of Pennsylvania to study medicine and graduated in 1872. He had a medical practice at Swedesboro for four years, after which he entered the law offices of Samuel H. Grey in Camden. He was admitted to the bar in 1878, and established a partnership with Thomas French with whom he remained partners until 1888.

In 1884, Garrison became Judge Advocate General of New Jersey. Governor of New Jersey Robert Stockton Green nominated him as an associate justice of the New Jersey Supreme Court in to succeed Justice Joel Parker. He served as associate justice from 1888 to 1893, when he resigned. He was renominated by Governor Werts and was confirmed in 1895. Governors Murphy, Fort and Fielder each re-nominated him for seven year terms in 1902, 1909 and 1916, but retired for health reasons around 1920.

Garrison resided in Merchantville. In 1893 he was elected as an honorary member of the New Jersey Society of the Cincinnati. He died on April 22, 1924.

== See also ==
- New Jersey Court of Errors and Appeals
- Courts of New Jersey
- List of justices of the Supreme Court of New Jersey
- List of United States political families (G)
