= Thomas Whitaker Trenchard =

American judge (1863–1942)

Thomas Whitaker Trenchard (December 13, 1863 – July 23, 1942) was an American lawyer and a justice of the New Jersey Supreme Court between 1906 and 1941.

Trenchard was born on December 13, 1863, in Centreton, Pittsgrove Township, Salem County, New Jersey, the son of William B. and Marie G. Trenchard. He graduated South Jersey Institute in 1882 and was admitted to bar in 1886. He practiced at Bridgeton, New Jersey, where he also acted as City Solicitor from 1892 to 1899. He was a Member of the House of Assembly in 1889 and a Republican presidential elector in 1896. He married Harriet M. Manning on November 17, 1891. They resided in Bridgeton, New Jersey.

He was appointed law judge of Cumberland County by Governor of New Jersey Foster McGowan Voorhees in 1899 and reappointed by Governor Murphy in 1904. He was appointed Justice of Supreme Court on June 8, 1906, to fill a vacancy and for full term on January 15, 1907. He is well known for being the presiding judge in the high-profile trial of Richard Hauptmann for the Lindbergh kidnapping. He retired in 1941.

He died on July 23, 1942, at his home in Trenton and is buried at the Old Broad Street Presbyterian Church and Cemetery in Bridgeton.

== In popular culture ==
Trenchard was portrayed by Walter Pidgeon in the 1976 TV movie The Lindbergh Kidnapping Case and by Gerald McRaney in J. Edgar (2011), both depicting the Lindbergh trial.

== See also ==
- List of justices of the Supreme Court of New Jersey
- New Jersey Court of Errors and Appeals
- Courts of New Jersey
