= Vincent S. Haneman =

American judge (1902–1978)

Vincent S. Haneman (April 25, 1902 – January 10, 1978) was an associate justice of the New Jersey Supreme Court from 1960 to 1971 during the era known for the Weintraub Court.

Born in Brooklyn, New York, Haneman was raised in East Orange, New Jersey. He was granted a law degree from Syracuse University College of Law in 1923. His start in public service came in 1926 when he was elected to the Board of Education of the Brigantine Public Schools and was named City Solicitor.

Haneman was a member of the Republican Party. He was Mayor of Brigantine, New Jersey from 1934 to 1942. In 1937, he became assemblyman from Atlantic County in the New Jersey General Assembly and served for seven years. He was the counsel for the New Jersey Racing Commission from 1940 to 1944.

In 1944, Governor of New Jersey Walter E. Edge appointed Haneman to serve on the Court of Common Pleas. He was appointed to the New Jersey Superior Court in 1947. He served as a New Jersey Supreme Court justice from 1960 to 1971 during the era known for the Weintraub Court.

Haneman resided in Brigantine. He died on January 10, 1978, of a heart attack while traveling to his winter home in Naples, Florida.

== Namesakes ==
An American Inns of Court is named in his honor. The Atlantic County, New Jersey Bar Association sponsors the Vincent S. Haneman-Joseph B. Perskie Scholarship. New Jersey Route 87 includes the Justice Vincent S. Haneman Memorial Bridge which crosses the Absecon Channel between Atlantic City and Brigantine.

== See also ==
- List of justices of the Supreme Court of New Jersey
- New Jersey Court of Errors and Appeals
- Courts of New Jersey
