= David A. Depue =

American judge (1826–1902)

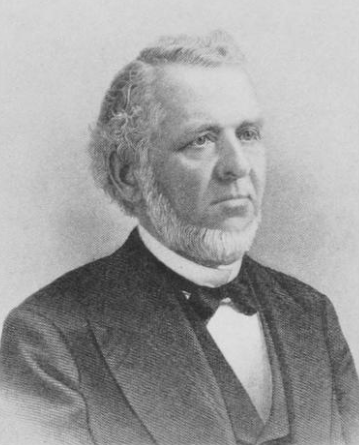

Chief Justice of the Supreme Court of New Jersey
- In office 1900–1901

Justice of the Supreme Court of New Jersey
- In office 1866–1900

Personal details
- Born: David Ayres Depue; October 27, 1826; Mount Bethel, Pennsylvania, US
- Died: April 3, 1902 (aged 75); Newark, New Jersey, US
- Education: Princeton University

David Ayres Depue (October 27, 1826 – April 3, 1902) was a justice of the Supreme Court of New Jersey from 1866 to 1900, serving as chief justice from 1900 to 1901.

== Biography ==
David Ayres Depue was born in Mount Bethel, Pennsylvania on October 27, 1826, to Benjamin Depue Elizabeth Ayres Depue. Depue received his primary education in the school of Rev. Dr. John Vanderveer, in Easton, Pennsylvania. In 1843 he entered Princeton University, graduating with the class of 1846. He read law in the office of John M. Sherrerd, of Belvidere, New Jersey, where Depue's family had moved in 1840. He was admitted to the bar in 1849 and practiced law until 1866. On November 16, 1863, Governor Marcus Lawrence Ward appointed him to a seat on the Supreme Court of New Jersey vacated by Daniel Haines. On May 1, 1900, Depue became Chief Justice, serving in that capacity until his retirement from the bench on November 16, 1901.

Within a year of his retirement, Depue died at his home in Newark, New Jersey, at the age of 76. His descendants included General David Ayres Depue Ogden.

== See also ==
- List of justices of the Supreme Court of New Jersey
- David Ayres Depue Ogden
- New Jersey Court of Errors and Appeals
- Courts of New Jersey

Political offices
Preceded by William J. Magie	Chief Justice of the Supreme Court of New Jersey; 1900 – 1901	Succeeded by William Stryker Gummere
Preceded by Daniel Haines	Associate Justice of the Supreme Court of New Jersey; 1866 – 1900	Succeeded by John Franklin Fort
