= A. Dayton Oliphant =

American judge (1887–1963)

Alfred Dayton Oliphant

Justice of the New Jersey Supreme Court
- In office 1945–1946
- In office 1948–1957

Personal details
- Born: October 28, 1887 Trenton, New Jersey, US
- Died: June 25, 1963 (aged 75) Princeton, New Jersey, US
- Education: Lawrenceville School; Princeton University; University of Pennsylvania

Alfred Dayton Oliphant (October 28, 1887 – June 25, 1963) was a Justice of the New Jersey Supreme Court from 1945 to 1946, and again from 1948 to 1957.

== Biography ==
Oliphant was born in Trenton, New Jersey on October 28, 1887, the son of Civil War General Samuel Duncan Oliphant and Elizabeth Van Dever (Dayton) Oliphant.

After graduating from the Lawrenceville School, he received his BA from Princeton University and his Juris Doctor (J.D.) University of Pennsylvania. He married Marguerite A. Broughton on June 21, 1924.

Oliphant was a Republican member of New Jersey General Assembly from Mercer County from 1915 to 1917 and Mercer County Prosecutor of the Pleas from 1918 to 1923.

Oliphant was circuit judge for Hudson, Middlesex and Mercer counties from 1927 to 1945. He was an associate justice of New Jersey Supreme Court, 1945–46 and again from 1948 to 1957. He served as Chancellor of New Jersey Court of Chancery from 1946 to 1948 during the rewriting of the Constitution of New Jersey and the reorganization of the state court system.

He died on June 25, 1963, in Princeton, New Jersey. He was interred in Riverview Cemetery in Trenton.

== See also ==
- List of justices of the Supreme Court of New Jersey
- New Jersey Court of Errors and Appeals
- Courts of New Jersey
