= Governor Case =

Governor Case may refer to:

- Clarence E. Case (1877–1961), Acting Governor of New Jersey in 1920
- Norman S. Case (1888–1967), 56th Governor of Rhode Island
