= Mark Sullivan (judge) =

American judge

Supreme Court Justice
- In office March 23, 1973 – August 11, 1981
- Appointed by: William T. Cahill

Mark A. Sullivan (August 11, 1911 – November 9, 2001) was an American judge and sat on the New Jersey Supreme Court for eight years.

Sullivan was born in Jersey City, New Jersey to Judge Sullivan of the New Jersey Court of Errors and Appeals, which was at the time New Jersey's highest court. Sullivan received his high school education at St. Peter's Preparatory School, his undergraduate degree from Georgetown University and his law degree from Harvard Law School. During World War II he served in the United States Navy as a combat intelligence officer aboard the escort aircraft carrier USS Croatan (CVE-25).

In 1945 he was appointed as a judge in the 2nd District Court of Jersey City. After the 1947 Constitution changed the structure of the New Jersey judiciary, he sat in the same county, but now as Presiding Judge of the Hudson County District Court. In 1953, he was elevated to the New Jersey Superior Court. In 1959, Chief Justice Joseph Weintraub, of the New Jersey Supreme Court, assigned him to the Appellate Division of Superior Court. Sullivan was appointed to the New Jersey Supreme Court by Governor William T. Cahill and was sworn in on March 23, 1973. During his eight years on the court he authored many decisions, including the initial reversal of the murder conviction of boxer Rubin "Hurricane" Carter. Sullivan retired from the New Jersey Supreme Court under the mandatory retirement provision of the New Jersey Constitution on August 11, 1981. Sullivan, however, continued to serve the judiciary as an adjunct judge in the Superior Court in Monmouth County, and in such high-profile cases as the recount of the gubernatorial election in 1981. Sullivan also accepted a number of administrative assignments for the New Jersey Supreme Court, including several years service as the chairmanship of the New Jersey Advisory Committee on Judicial Conduct.

== Personal life ==
Sullivan was married to Mary Josephine Hamill, the daughter of Congressman James A. Hamill. Justice Sullivan's wife predeceased him by two years. They had one son.
