= Judge Knapp =

Judge Knapp may refer to:

- Dennis Raymond Knapp (1912–1998), judge of the United States District Court for the Southern District of West Virginia
- Martin Augustine Knapp (1843–1923), judge of the United States Courts of Appeals for the Second Circuit and the Fourth Circuit
- Whitman Knapp (1909–2004), judge of the United States District Court for the Southern District of New York

== See also ==
- Manning M. Knapp (1825–1892), associate justice of the New Jersey Supreme Court
