= Perskie =

Perskie is a surname. Notable people with the surname include:

- Joseph B. Perskie (1885–1957), American jurist from New Jersey
- Steven P. Perskie (born 1945), American jurist from New Jersey
