= Albert E. Burling =

American judge (1891–1960)

Albert E. Burling (August 3, 1891 – October 29, 1960) was a justice of the New Jersey Supreme Court from 1947 to 1960.

== Biography ==
Burling was born in Camden and resided in Pennsauken Township in Camden County, New Jersey. He graduated from the Temple University Beasley School of Law.

Burling was law partner of John B. Kates and maintained offices at the Wilson Building in Camden. He was a member of the New Jersey Senate from Camden County from 1936 to 1938. He was a circuit judge in New Jersey from 1942 to 1947 and served as an associate justice of the New Jersey Supreme Court from 1947 to 1960. He was appointed to the Supreme Court by Governor of New Jersey Alfred E. Driscoll in 1947 and received his reappointment seven years later by Robert B. Meyner.

== Death and legacy ==
He died in office in 1960 and was interred at Harleigh Cemetery in Camden.

A magnet elementary school in Pennsauken is named is his honor.

== See also ==
- List of justices of the Supreme Court of New Jersey
- New Jersey Court of Errors and Appeals
- Courts of New Jersey
