= Joseph B. Perskie =

American judge (1885–1957)

Joseph B. Perskie (July 20, 1885 – May 29, 1957) was an associate justice of the New Jersey Supreme Court from 1933 to 1947.

Perskie was born at the Alliance Colony in Pittsgrove Township, New Jersey on July 20, 1885, the son of Lazar Perskie and Minnie (Levit) Perskie. He moved with his family to Atlantic City, New Jersey when he was 11 years old, and graduated from Atlantic City High School in 1904. He received his law degree in 1907 from the University of Pennsylvania Law School.

He married Beatrice Maslansky on November 27, 1910. He is the father of David M. Perskie (1913–1969) and Marvin D. Perskie and grandfather of Steven P. Perskie. He resided in Atlantic City and was interred at Beth Kehillah Cemetery in Egg Harbor Township, New Jersey.

The Atlantic County, New Jersey Bar Association sponsors the Vincent S. Haneman-Joseph B. Perskie Scholarship.

== See also ==
- List of justices of the Supreme Court of New Jersey
- New Jersey Court of Errors and Appeals
- Courts of New Jersey
