= James J. Bergen =

American judge (1847–1923)

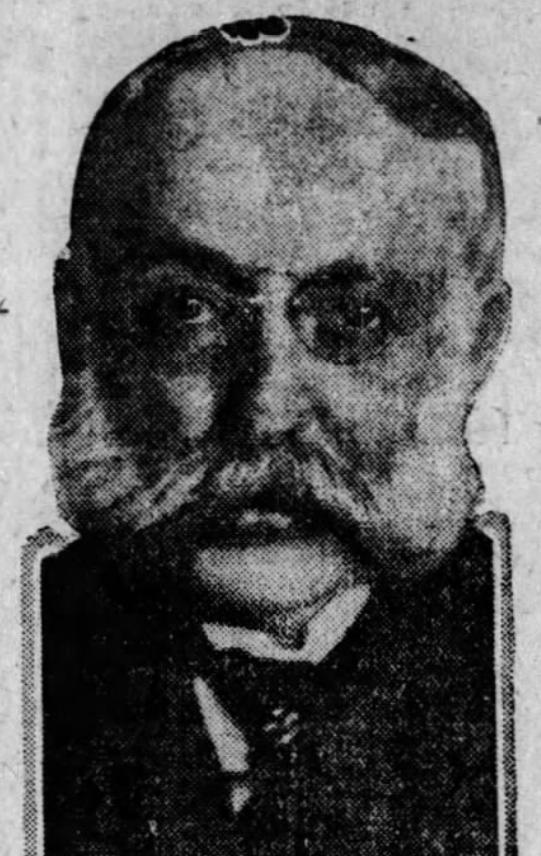

Justice of the Supreme Court of New Jersey
- In office 1907 – October 20, 1923
- Appointed by: Edward C. Stokes

Speaker of the New Jersey General Assembly
- In office 1891–1892

Member of the New Jersey General Assembly from Somerset County
- In office 1876–1877
- In office 1891–1892

Personal details
- Born: October 1, 1847 Somerville, New Jersey
- Died: October 20, 1923 (aged 76) Somerville, New Jersey
- Party: Democratic
- Spouse: Helen Arden Huggins (m. 1883)
- Children: three

James J. Bergen (October 1, 1847 – October 20, 1923) was an American lawyer, jurist, banker, and Democratic Party politician from Somerville, New Jersey who served as speaker of the New Jersey General Assembly from 1891 to 1892 and an associate justice of the New Jersey Supreme Court from 1907 until his death in 1923.

== Early life and education ==
James J. Bergen was born on October 1, 1847 in Somerville, New Jersey to John James Bergen and Mary Ann (née Park) Bergen. His family traced their ancestry in the United States to Hans Hansen Bergen and Sarah Rapelje, and his father was engaged in the lumber business.

Bergen attended the Brick Academy and Calvin Butler Seminary before reading law under H. M. Gatson. He was admitted to the bar as an attorney in November 1868 and as a counselor in November 1871.

== Legal and business career ==
In 1870, Bergen formed a law partnership with his former tutor, H. M. Gatson, which continued until Gatson retired in 1890.

For a time, Bergen was president of the Somerville Savings Bank. He was also a director of the First National Bank of Somerville.

== Political career ==
In 1875, Bergen was elected to represent Somerset County in the New Jersey General Assembly. He was re-elected in 1876. His election as a member of the Democratic Party was notable in Somerset County, which was typically Republican. After leaving office, he was appointed by Governor Joseph D. Bedle as Somerset County prosecutor from 1877 to 1883. He also served as president of the Somerville Board of Commissioners for several years.

He was elected to the General Assembly again in 1890 and re-elected in 1891. He served as speaker of the General Assembly in both of his final terms.

He was a delegate to the 1896 Democratic National Convention, where the New Jersey delegation boycotted the nomination of William Jennings Bryan.

== Judicial service ==
In 1904, Bergen was appointed by Chancellor William J. Magie as vice chancellor of the New Jersey Court of Chancery. On October 11, 1907, Governor Edward C. Stokes appointed him to the Supreme Court of New Jersey; he resigned his position as vice chancellor. He was reappointed by Governor James Fairman Fielder in 1914 and Edward I. Edwards in 1921, serving until his death. As associate justice, he rode circuit in Union and Middlesex counties.

== Personal life and death ==
He married Helen Arden Huggins in Somerville on May 3, 1883. They had four children, including Francis L. Bergen, who served as an assistant prosecutor in Somerset County.

He was a member of the Raritan Valley Country Club and Bachelor Club of Somerville.

He died of cardiac arrest during his sleep at his home in Somerville on October 20, 1923.

== See also ==
- List of justices of the Supreme Court of New Jersey
- Courts of New Jersey
