= David Ayres Depue Ogden =

United States Army general

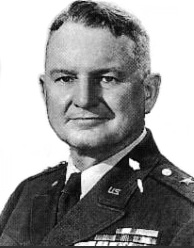
- General Ogden as Commander of the Ryukyus Command in the early 1950s
- Born: 16 October 1897; Newark, New Jersey, U.S.
- Died: 26 November 1969 (aged 72); Bradenton, Florida, U.S.
- Burial place: Arlington National Cemetery
- Military career
- Allegiance: United States
- Branch: United States Army
- Service years: 1918-1957
- Rank: Lieutenant general
- Commands: 3rd Engineer Special Brigade; Fort Ord, California; Ryukyus Command; US Army Inspector General
- Conflicts: World War I; World War II
- Awards: Distinguished Service Medal; Legion of Merit; Bronze Star Medal

David Ayres Depue Ogden (16 October 1897 – 26 November 1969) was a United States Army lieutenant general. He was noteworthy for his command of the 3rd Engineer Special Brigade during World War II, the Ryukyus Command in the early 1950s, and his culminating assignment as the US Army's Inspector General.

== Early life ==
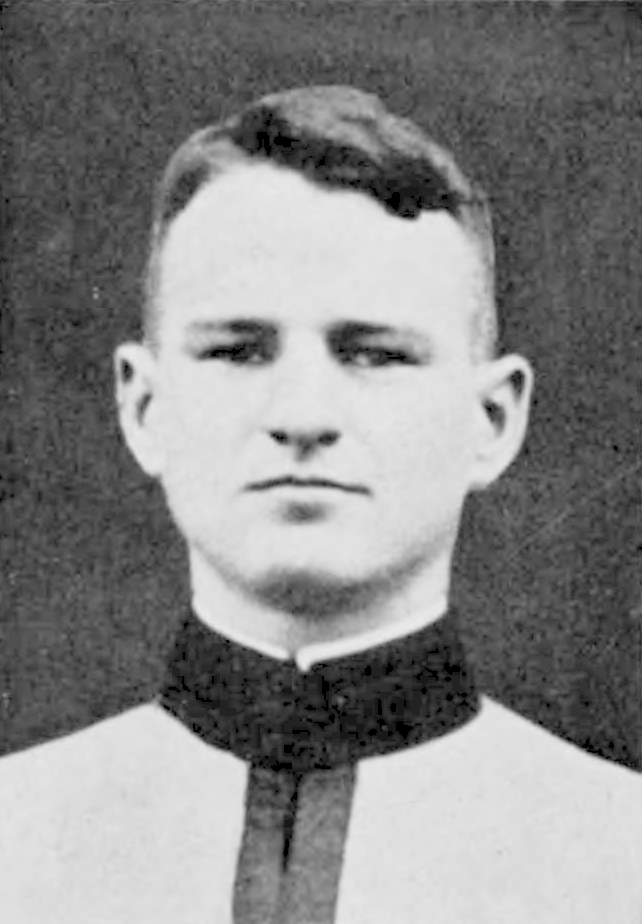
At West Point in 1918

Ogden was born in Newark, New Jersey, and was named for his maternal grandfather, New Jersey Supreme Court justice David Ayres Depue. He graduated from the Kent School and attended Princeton University before transferring to the United States Military Academy. He graduated in 1918 and was commissioned a Second Lieutenant in the Engineers.

== World War I ==
After receiving his commission Ogden carried out an observation tour of Europe at the end of World War I, after which he completed the Engineer Officer Course at Camp Humphreys, Virginia.

== Post World War I ==
In 1923 Ogden was assigned to Camp Devens, Massachusetts, instructing Reserve officers in engineering.

During the early 1930s Ogden was assigned as assistant to the chief engineer of the district that included Chicago.

By the mid-1930s, Ogden had been promoted to captain and assigned to the Los Angeles, California engineer district.

In 1940 Ogden was named district engineer in Trinidad.

== World War II ==
Ogden was appointed to command the 3rd Engineer Special Brigade in 1942, and he remained in command until July 1945. ESBs were organized to conduct amphibious operations during combat, moving soldiers from transport ships to landing sites on a beach, or from beaches to transport ships. The 3rd ESB operated in the Southwest Pacific Theater throughout the war.

== Post-World War II ==
Following World War II General Ogden commanded Fort Ord, California.

In 1947 Ogden was selected for command of the Eniwetok atomic test site.

Ogden returned to the United States in 1950 as chief of the organization and training section in the Army's Training and Operations Directorate, G-3.

General Ogden was named Chief Engineer of the Far East Command in 1952.

In 1953 General Ogden was named to head the Ryukyus Command and appointed as the islands' Deputy Governor.

Ogden was appointed the Army's Deputy Inspector General in 1955. In 1956 he became Inspector General and was promoted to lieutenant general, serving until his 1957 retirement.

== Awards and decorations ==
General Ogden's decorations included multiple awards of the Distinguished Service Medal, as well as the Legion of Merit and the Bronze Star Medal.

== Retirement and death ==
In retirement Ogden lived in Wenatchee, Washington. He later moved to Bradenton, Florida, where he died on 26 November 1969. He was buried at Arlington National Cemetery, Section 3 Site 2506-R.
