= 1892 New Jersey gubernatorial election =

- November 8, 1892
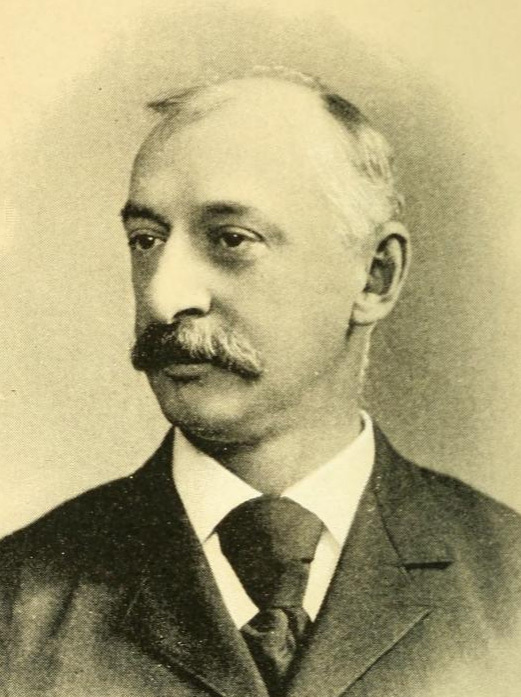

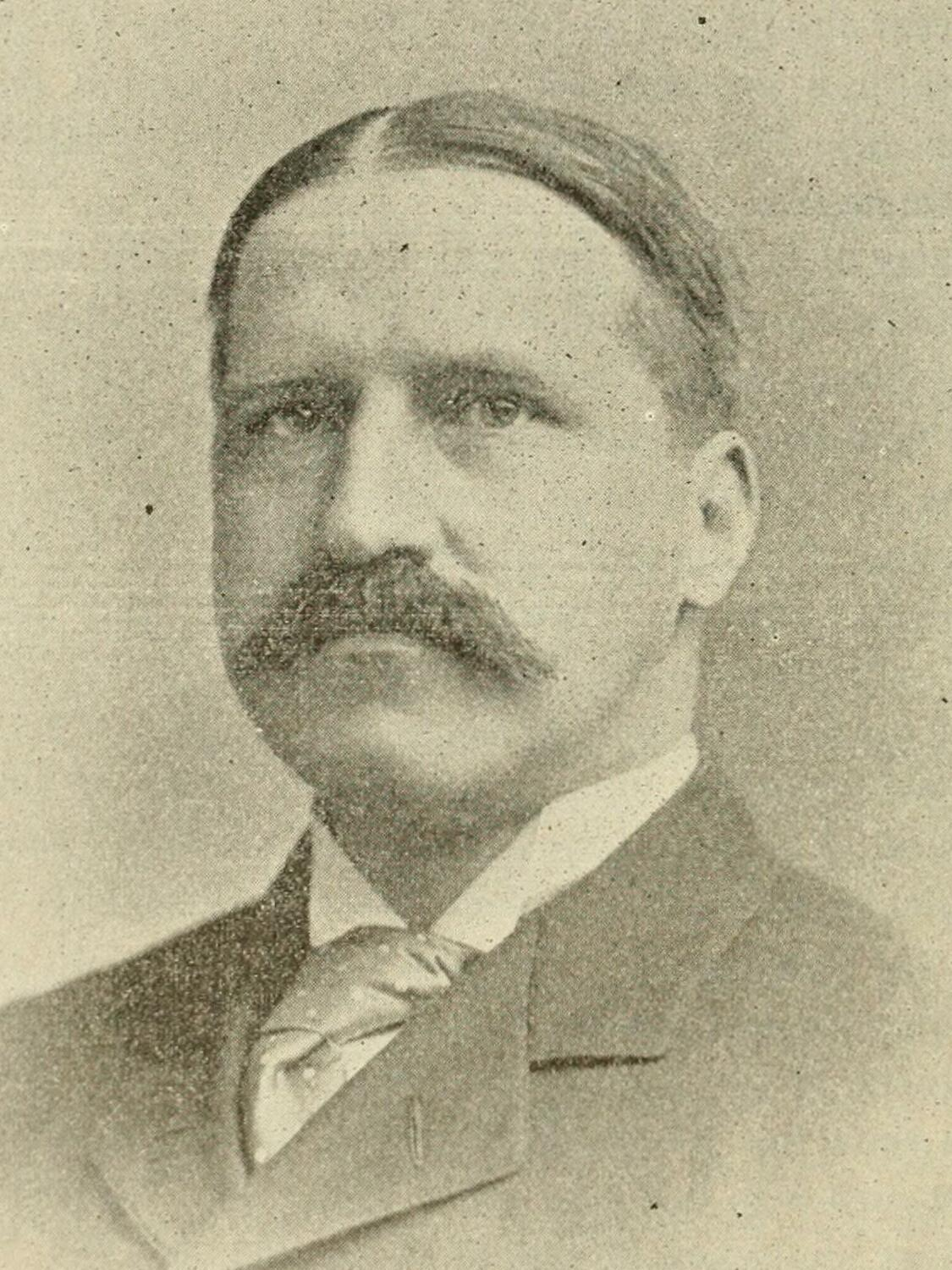
Nominee	George Theodore Werts	John Kean
Party	Democratic	Republican
Popular vote	167,257	159,632
Percentage	49.65%	47.39%
- County results Werts: 40–50% 50–60% Kean: 40–50% 50–60%
Governor before election
Leon Abbett
Democratic
Elected Governor
George Theodore Werts
Democratic

The 1892 New Jersey gubernatorial election was held on November 8, 1892. Democratic nominee George Theodore Werts defeated Republican nominee John Kean with 49.65% of the vote.

This was the ninth consecutive Democratic gubernatorial victory, the party's longest in history.

== General election ==
=== Candidates ===
- Benjamin Bird, (Populist)
- John Kean, chair of the New Jersey Republican Party and former U.S. Representative (Republican)
- George B. Keim, (Socialist Labor)
- Thomas J. Kennedy, (Prohibition)
- George Theodore Werts, State Senator for Morris County and President of the New Jersey Senate (Democratic)

=== Results ===
New Jersey gubernatorial election, 1892
Party	Candidate	Votes	%	±%
Democratic	George Theodore Werts	167,257	49.65%	▼1.72
Republican	John Kean	159,632	47.39%	▲1.31
Prohibition	Thomas J. Kennedy	7,750	2.30%	▼0.25
Socialist Labor	George B. Keim	1,338	0.40%	N/A
Populist	Benjamin Bird	894	0.27%	N/A
Majority				
Total votes		336,871	100.00%	
Democratic hold		Swing		
