= Nelson B. Gaskill =

American government official (1875–1964)

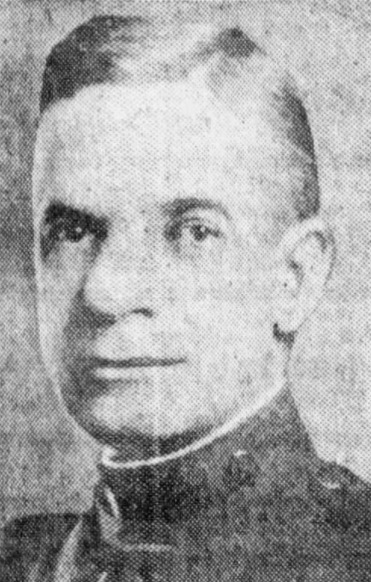
- Gaskill in 1920

Chair of the Federal Trade Commission
- In office December 1, 1921 – November 30, 1922
- President: Warren G. Harding
- Preceded by: Samuel Huston Thompson
- Succeeded by: Victor Murdock

Personal details
- Born: Nelson Burr Gaskill; September 1875
- Died: October 6, 1964 (aged 89)
- Parent: Joseph H. Gaskill (father)
- Education: Princeton University; Harvard University

Nelson Burr Gaskill (September 1875 – October 6, 1964) was the chair of the Federal Trade Commission from December 1, 1921, to November 30, 1922.

The son of New Jersey judge Joseph H. Gaskill, Gaskill received his undergraduate degree from Princeton University in 1896, where he won a senior prize for oratory, followed by a law degree from Harvard Law School. He joined the New Jersey National Guard, where he was elected captain of his company in 1902, and served as Assistant Attorney General for New Jersey. He eventually attained the rank of colonel in the New Jersey National Guard, and was active during World War I.

In 1919, President Woodrow Wilson appointed Gaskill to a seat on the Federal Trade Commission vacated by the retirement of John Franklin Fort, due to illness. Gaskill was reappointed to the FTC by President Calvin Coolidge in 1924.

Gaskill died at the age of 89.

Political offices
Preceded by Samuel Huston Thompson	Chairman of the Federal Trade Commission; 1921–1922	Succeeded by Victor Murdock
