= Jack M. Sabatino =

American judge (born 1958)

Judge of the New Jersey Superior Court, Appellate Division
- Incumbent
- Assumed office March 1, 2006
- Appointed by: Christine Todd Whitman

Personal details
- Born: February 21, 1958 (age 67)
- Education: Yale University (BA); Harvard Law School (JD)

Jack M. Sabatino (born February 21, 1958) is a judge of the New Jersey Superior Court, Appellate Division.

== Early life and education ==
Sabatino was born on February 21, 1958. He received a Bachelor of Arts, summa cum laude from Yale University in 1979 and Juris Doctor, cum laude, from Harvard Law School in 1982.

== Career ==
Sabatino was first appointed to the bench in 2001 by Governor Christine Todd Whitman to the New Jersey Superior Court. He was temporarily assigned to the Appellate Division in September 2005, and permanently assigned to the Appellate Division in March 2006. Between September 2022 and July 2023, he was temporarily assigned to the New Jersey Supreme Court to fill the vacancy created by the retirement of Justice Barry T. Albin. Following the confirmation of Justice Michael Noriega to permanently fill Albin's seat, Sabatino returned to the Appellate Division.
