= Senator Magee =

Senator Magee may refer to:

- Christopher Magee (politician) (1848–1901), Pennsylvania State Senate
- William A. Magee (1873–1938), Pennsylvania State Senate

== See also ==
- William J. Magie (1832–1917), New Jersey State Senate
