= Frederick Wilson Hall =

American judge (1908–1984)

Frederick Wilson Hall (February 22, 1908 – July 7, 1984) was an American judge and associate justice of the New Jersey Supreme Court from 1959 to 1975.

Hall was born in Pittsburgh on February 22, 1908, the son of Peter B. Hall and Rachel (Crispin) Hall. He graduated from Rutgers University and Harvard Law School. He founded and practiced law at the firm of Wharton and Hall.

Hall was a Democrat. He sat on the New Jersey Superior Court from 1953 to 1959 and on the New Jersey Supreme Court from 1959 to 1975 in an era known as the Weintraub Court. Hall wrote the decision in the 1975 case Southern Burlington County N.A.A.C.P. v. Mount Laurel Township (commonly called Mount Laurel I), which affects affordable housing policy in New Jersey.

He married Jane R. Armstrong on July 18, 1936. A resident of Somerville, New Jersey, he died July 7, 1984.

== See also ==
- List of justices of the Supreme Court of New Jersey
- New Jersey Court of Errors and Appeals
- Courts of New Jersey
