= Mercer Beasley =

American judge

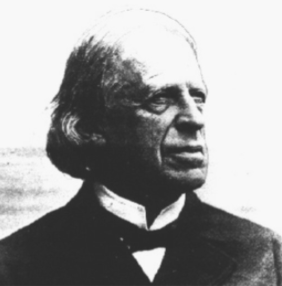
Mercer Beasley

Mercer Beasley (March 27, 1815 – February 19, 1897) was a chief justice of the New Jersey Supreme Court from 1864 to 1897.

He was born March 27, 1815, in Philadelphia, Pennsylvania, the son of Frederick and Maria Beasley. He studied at the College of New Jersey (now Princeton) for a year and later studied the law. In 1838 he was admitted to the bar and had his practice in Trenton, New Jersey, where he was candidate for mayor.

Following the death of Chief Justice Edward W. Whelpley, Beasely was appointed by the Governor of New Jersey to a seven-year term to the Supreme Court as chief justice on March 8, 1864. Beasley served in that capacity for nearly 33 years.

Beasley died from pneumonia on February 19, 1897, in Trenton and was interred at Riverview Cemetery.

Mercer Beasley School of Law was established in 1924 and was the predecessor institution to the Rutgers School of Law – Newark.

== See also ==
- List of justices of the Supreme Court of New Jersey

Legal offices
| Preceded by Edward W. Whelpley | Chief Justice of the New Jersey Supreme Court; 1864–1897 | Succeeded by William J. Magie |
