= Manning M. Knapp =

American judge (1825–1892)

Manning M. Knapp (June 7, 1825 – January 26, 1892) was a justice of the New Jersey Supreme Court from 1889 to 1892.

Knapp was born in Newton, New Jersey, where he studied law in the office of Robert Hamilton. In 1846, he began practice in Hackensack and was made a counsellor in 1850. He was married in 1850 to Anna Mattison and they resided in Hackensack.

Knapp was initially appointed to act as prosecutor for the state and in 1851 Governor George Franklin Fort appointed him for a full term after which he remained the position in successive appointments until 1861.

In 1875, when Joseph D. Bedle was elected governor, he appointed Knapp as his successor on the bench of the Supreme Court, his judicial district covering the counties of Hudson, Bergen and Passaic. Hudson County was made a separate district at which he continued until his sudden death on January 26, 1892 while presiding over the court in Jersey City.

== See also ==
- List of justices of the Supreme Court of New Jersey
- New Jersey Court of Errors and Appeals
- Courts of New Jersey
