= Lindley Miller Garrison =

American politician (1864-1932)

Lindley Garrison
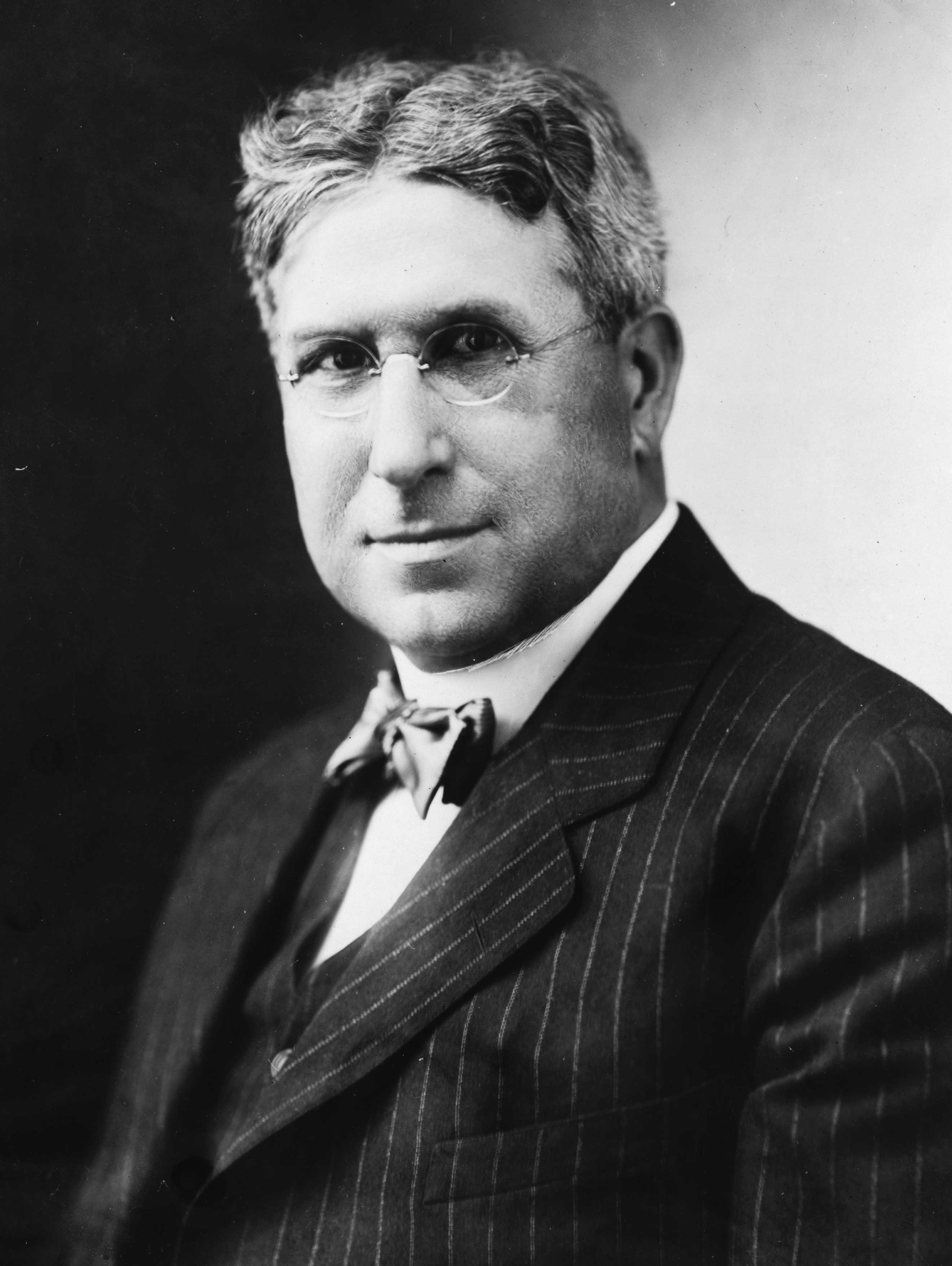
- Garrison in 1913

46th United States Secretary of War
- In office March 5, 1913 – February 10, 1916
- President: Woodrow Wilson
- Preceded by: Henry L. Stimson
- Succeeded by: Newton D. Baker

Personal details
- Born: Lindley Miller Garrison; November 28, 1864 Camden, New Jersey, U.S.
- Died: October 19, 1932 (aged 67) Sea Bright, New Jersey, U.S.
- Party: Democratic
- Spouse: Margaret Hildeburn (m. 1899)
- Education: Harvard University (BA); University of Pennsylvania (LLB)

Lindley Miller Garrison (November 28, 1864 – October 19, 1932) was an American lawyer from New Jersey who served as Secretary of War under U.S. President Woodrow Wilson between 1913 and 1916.

== Biography ==
=== Early years ===
Lindley Miller Garrison was born in Camden, New Jersey, the son of the Reverend Joseph Fithian Garrison (1823–1892) and Elizabeth Vanarsdale (Grant) Garrison (1829–1903). His brother was Charles G. Garrison, an associate justice of the New Jersey Supreme Court He attended public schools and the Protestant Episcopal Academy in Philadelphia, Pennsylvania. He studied at Phillips Exeter Academy for one year before attending Harvard University as a special student from 1884 to 1885. He studied law in the office of Redding, Jones & Carson of Philadelphia, received a law degree from the University of Pennsylvania, and was admitted to the bar in 1886. He practiced law in Camden from 1888 to 1898 and became a partner in the firm of Garrison, McManus & Enright in Jersey City in 1899. He married Margaret Hildeburn in Jersey City on 30 June 1899. Garrison served as vice-chancellor of New Jersey from 1904 to 1913, where he came to Governor Woodrow Wilson's notice.

=== Secretary of War ===
From March 5, 1913 to February 10, 1916, Garrison served as Secretary of War in the Wilson administration. Garrison and Wilson never fit well together. Garrison was much more willing to intervene militarily overseas than was the President. This was especially evident in regard to Mexico. Garrison urged American intervention into the Mexican revolution to restore order. During the Preparedness campaign of 1916, when Wilson was trying to convince Congress to raise military spending, Garrison supported a plan for expanding the US military with what he called the Continental Army Plan. Garrison's proposal would establish a standing army of 140,000 and a national, volunteer reserve force of 400,000 men. Wilson initially gave the plan tepid support, but Garrison ran into opposition from both those who felt his plan went too far in creating a large standing army, as well as from those who felt it did not go far enough. Wilson was convinced by allies in Congress to back an alternative plan which emphasized not Garrison's national volunteer force, but a continued role for the states' National Guard. Garrison resigned in February 1916 over these differences.

=== Later years ===
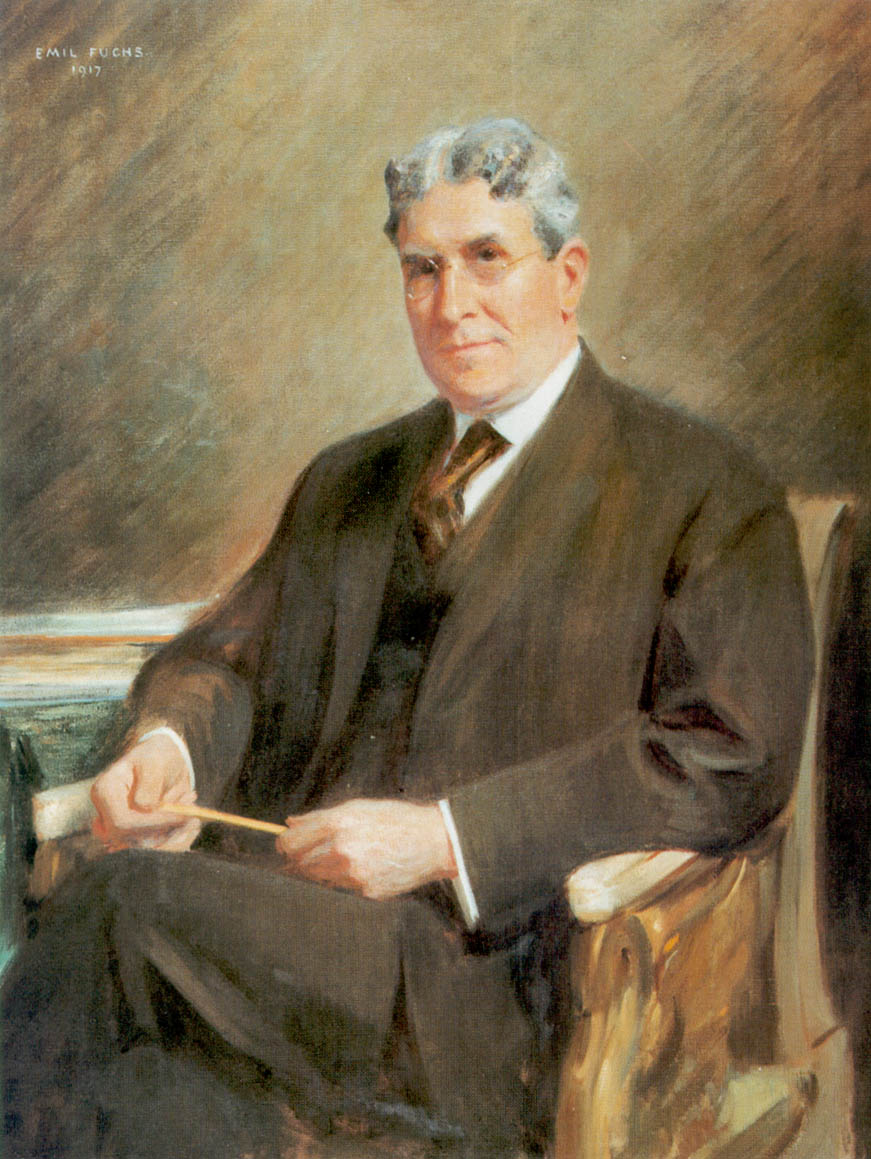
Portrait by Emil Fuchs, 1917

After leaving Wilson's administration Garrison returned to the practice of law in the firm of Hornblower, Miller & Garrison (now Willkie Farr & Gallagher LLP). He was appointed receiver of the Brooklyn Rapid Transit Company in December 1918 and served until June 1923. His wife Margaret died in Manhattan in 1926. He died on October 19, 1932, at his home in Sea Bright, New Jersey.

== Sources ==
- Bell, William Gardner (1992). "Lindley Miller Garrison". Secretaries of War and Secretaries of the Army. United States Army Center of Military History. Archived from the original on December 14, 2007.

Political offices
Preceded by Henry L. Stimson	U.S. Secretary of War; Served under: Woodrow Wilson; March 5, 1913 – February 10, 1916	Succeeded by Newton D. Baker
