= William A. Wachenfeld =

American judge (1889–1969)

William A. Wachenfeld (February 24, 1889 – April 22, 1969) was a justice of the New Jersey Supreme Court from 1946 to 1959.

== Biography ==
Wachenfeld was born in Orange, New Jersey, on February 24, 1889. He attended Polytechnic Institute of New York University, from which he received his Bachelor's and Juris Doctor (J.D.)

He married Anne Gilmore Weir on February 26, 1925. He unsuccessfully ran for Governor of New Jersey in the New Jersey gubernatorial election, 1937.

He died on April 22, 1969, in Livingston, New Jersey. He is interred at Rosedale Cemetery in Orange, New Jersey.

== See also ==
- List of justices of the Supreme Court of New Jersey
