= Edward W. Whelpley =

American politician (1818–1864)

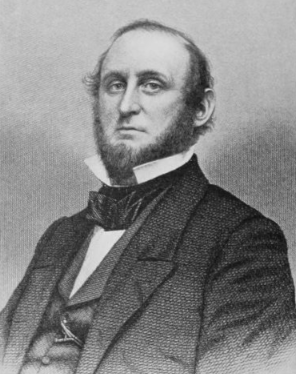

Chief Justice of the New Jersey Supreme Court
- In office January 31, 1861 – February 21, 1864

Justice of the New Jersey Supreme Court
- In office September 1858 – February 21, 1864

Member of the New Jersey General Assembly
- In office 1848–1849
- Constituency: Morris Township, New Jersey

Personal details
- Born: Edward William Whelpley; 1818 Morristown, New Jersey, US
- Died: February 21, 1864 (aged 46) Morristown, New Jersey, US
- Spouse: Eliza Woodruff
- Children: 4
- Education: Princeton University
- Occupation: Lawyer, politician

Edward William Whelpley (1818 – February 21, 1864) was a New Jersey attorney and politician who served as Speaker of the New Jersey General Assembly in 1849 and as Chief Justice of the New Jersey Supreme Court from 1861 until his death in 1864.

== Early life, education, and career ==
Born in Morristown, New Jersey, Whelpley was the son of Dr. William Avery Whelpley, a New England-born physician and nephew of the Reverend Samuel Whelpley.

He graduated from Princeton University, with distinction, in 1834, at the age of sixteen. After teaching school for two years, he studied law under the guidance of his uncle, Vice-Chancellor Amzi Dodd. Whelpley was licensed as attorney in May 1839, and became a counsellor three years later. He entered the practice of law in Newark, New Jersey, and in 1841 he moved back to Morristown where he became a partner in the firm of Jacob W. Miller.

Whelpley had a legal rivalry with attorney Abraham O. Zabriskie, who was known for being formidable when fully dedicated to a case. Amzi Dodd recounts a case in which Whelpley retained Dodd as his junior in a challenging contest against Zabriskie. Whelpley instructed Dodd to open the argument and present the case as mildly as possible, so that "old Zab" would not be aroused. Dodd accepted the role and played it, and Zabriskie "was not waked up to make much of an effort", and then Whelpley, having the last word, "put the case with all his power".

In 1847, Whelpley was elected to the New Jersey General Assembly representing Morris Township, New Jersey. He served in the sessions of 1848 and 1849, and was named Speaker of the Assembly in 1849.

== Judicial career ==
In fall of 1858, Whelpley, then forty years old, was appointed to a seat on the New Jersey Supreme Court vacated by the resignation of Justice Martin Ryerson. Less than three years later, on January 31, 1861, Whelpley was elevated to the position of Chief Justice, succeeding Henry W. Green, who had become Chancellor of New Jersey. Whelpley's promotion "was generally approved, and there was hope that he would serve for many years at the head of the court". However, Whelpley died in 1864, after only three years in office.

== Noted opinions ==
In the 1860 case of Adams v. Ross, argued by Zabriskie and Bradley, Whelpley held that the use of the word "heirs" is necessary to the creation of a fee, and that no other expression of intent could remedy the omission and, consequently, that a grant to one for life and then to her children was not a fee simple or fee tail but an estate for life, with a covenant to stand seized for the benefit of the children, in which the husband was not entitled to curtesy, and that the grant was not enlarged by a warranty to the grantee and her heirs.

The 1862 case of Newark City Bank v. The Assessor, related to the taxation of United States bonds and state bonds expressly exempted from taxation. This case arose from the New Jersey tax act of March 28, 1862, which aimed to more evenly distribute the burden of taxation rendered necessary by the American Civil War. Whelpley challenged the reasoning behind a recent decision of the Court of Appeals of New York, which had held that United States bonds were taxable if included in the bulk of the property of the person taxed. Whelpley further decided that both state and federal laws made national credit in the hands of an individual is free from taxation by the state. He also addressed the issue of taxing extra-territorial stocks owned by persons taxable in the state, holding that corporations were entitled to have amounts of exempt state and national securities deducted from their capital and surplus.

In Telfer v. Northern Railroad Company, Whelpley articulated the rule that in the absence of legislation or lawful municipal restrictions, it is not considered negligence for railroad trains to run at high speed over crossings of common highways, even when other vehicles are approaching, and that the care to be used "must be in proportion to the danger incident to the particular locality". He also addressed the issue of damages in cases involving the death of a child under the statute that allowed actions for wrongful death and permitted damages for pecuniary injury and held the damages found to be excessive.

== Personal life and death ==
Whelpley married Eliza Woodruff of Mendham, with whom he had a son and three daughters. There is a portrait of the Chief Justice hanging in the Supreme Court room. He was a strong man in apparently vigorous health. However, after just over two years as Chief Justice, he was stricken with Bright's disease and died in Morristown, New Jersey, in 1864, at the age of 46.

Political offices
| Preceded by John W. C. Evans | Speaker of the New Jersey General Assembly; 1849–1849 | Succeeded by John T. Nixon |
| Preceded by Martin Ryerson | Justice of the Supreme Court of New Jersey; 1858–1861 | Succeeded by George Houston Brown |
| Preceded by Henry W. Green | Chief Justice of the Supreme Court of New Jersey; 1861–1864 | Succeeded by Mercer Beasley |
