= Centerton, New Jersey =

Centerton, New Jersey may refer to:

- Centerton, Burlington County, New Jersey
- Centerton, Salem County, New Jersey
