= Latino Action Network v. New Jersey =

- Court: New Jersey Superior Court; Mercer County, New Jersey Superior Court
- Full case name: Latino Action Network et al. v. The State of New Jersey et al.

Court membership
- Judge sitting: Robert Lougy

Keywords
- Education

Latino Action Network v. New Jersey is a lawsuit filed on May 17, 2018, on the anniversary of Brown v. Board of Education which claims that the State of New Jersey provides separate and unequal schools to minority children in violation of their constitutional rights and that there is segregation in New Jersey public schools.

The state's largest teachers union, the New Jersey Education Association, supports the case.

== History and current procedural status ==
In April 2019, it was reported that settlement talks had broken down.

In March 2022, Judge Robert Lougy held a hearing in the matter and, as of October 2022, the parties await a ruling.

== Lawyers ==
The plaintiffs are represented by Gary Saul Stein's son, Michael Stein of Pashman Stein Walder Hayden in Hackensack, New Jersey, as well as by Lawrence Lustberg of Gibbons in Newark. Lustberg helped lead Governor Phil Murphy's transition team on law.

== Plaintiffs ==
The suit was filed on behalf of the NAACP New Jersey State Conference, the Latino Coalition, Latino Action Network, Urban League of Essex County, the United Methodist Church of Greater New Jersey, and nine children who attend school in segregated school districts.

Gary S. Stein, father of plaintiffs' attorney Michael Stein and former associate justice of the New Jersey Supreme Court, and Ryan Haygood, an alum of Murphy's transition team, recently helped form the New Jersey Coalition for Diverse and Inclusive Schools, to help orchestrate the case.

One of the child plaintiffs is the son of Murphy transition team member Jon Whiten.

Chris Estevez, also an alum of Murphy's transition team as a union representative, additionally helps lead the case as president of the Latino Action Network.

== Plaintiffs' arguments ==
The complaint argues that the state "has been complicit in the creation and persistence of school segregation" by adopting policies that "deny an alarming number of Black and Latino students the benefits of a thorough and efficient education."

They also assert that charter schools in New Jersey are as segregated as "the most intensely segregated urban public schools," if not more so segregated.

== Proposed remedies ==
Some, such as Senator Ronald Rice, have suggested forced busing as a remedy to the segregation in 2019. Others have suggested countywide school districts as a remedy.

== Concerns ==
=== Busing and merger ===
Some, such as Minority Leader Jon Bramnick, have expressed concerns that the desegregation suit could lead to forced merger of school districts, forced desegregation busing, and forced lottery systems whereby children would not be permitted to attend their neighborhood school.

=== Racial categorization controversy ===
The plaintiffs' lawsuit asserts that NJ schools are "segregated" because of a concentration of African-American and "Latino" children in certain districts, with very few "white" students. Over 65% of U.S. Latinos, however, identify as "White." Just over 2% identify as "Black." The remainder identify as some other race or two or more races.

In 2019, the conservative Pacific Legal Foundation filed a federal lawsuit arguing that Connecticut's magnet schools are discriminatory by capping the enrollment of black and Hispanic students in magnet schools at 75%, while no less than 25% of students were permitted to be white or Asian.

== See also ==
- Boston desegregation busing crisis
- Education segregation in New Jersey
