= Haydn Proctor =

American judge (1903–1996)

Associate Justice of the New Jersey Supreme Court
- In office October 28, 1957 – 1973
- Preceded by: A. Dayton Oliphant
- Succeeded by: Morris Pashman

Member of the New Jersey Senate from Monmouth County
- In office 1939–1948
- Preceded by: Frank Durand
- Succeeded by: J. Stanley Herbert

Personal details
- Born: June 16, 1903 Ocean Grove, New Jersey
- Died: October 2, 1996 (aged 93) Lakewood, New Jersey
- Party: Republican
- Education: Neptune High School
- Alma mater: Lafayette College; Yale Law School

Haydn Proctor (June 16, 1903 – October 2, 1996) was an American politician and judge who served as President of the New Jersey Senate and Associate Justice of the New Jersey Supreme Court.

== Biography ==
Proctor was born on June 16, 1903, in the Ocean Grove section of Neptune Township, New Jersey. He attended Neptune High School, graduating in 1922, and Lafayette College, graduating in 1926. He went on to Yale Law School, where he was associate editor of the Yale Law Journal, earning his law degree in 1929. He served Monmouth County as a Republican member of the New Jersey General Assembly in 1936 and 1937. In 1937, he was appointed Judge of the District Court of the First Judicial District of Monmouth County.

He was elected to the New Jersey Senate in 1938 and was reelected in 1941 and 1944. He was majority leader of the Senate in 1945 and Senate President in 1946, serving as Acting Governor in the absence of Governor Walter Evans Edge. Governor Edge nominated him to a vacancy on the Circuit Court in December 1946, and he was sworn in after the end of his Senate term in March 1947. He was a delegate to the New Jersey Constitutional convention of 1947. He became a Superior Court Judge in September 1948 and was reappointed by Governor Alfred E. Driscoll in 1953.

In August 1957, Governor Robert B. Meyner appointed Proctor to be an associate justice of the New Jersey Supreme Court. He was confirmed immediately by the State Senate and began serving in October 1957, after the retirement of Justice A. Dayton Oliphant. He was reappointed by Governor Richard J. Hughes in 1964. and served during the era known as the Weintraub Court.

In 1973, Proctor left the bench after reaching the mandatory retirement age 70. He served on the Supreme Court's Committee on Opinions until he was 87. He died on October 2, 1996, aged 93, at a hospital near his home in Lakewood Township.

== See also ==
- List of justices of the Supreme Court of New Jersey

Political offices
Preceded by Frank S. Farley	President of the New Jersey Senate; 1946	Succeeded by Charles K. Barton
