= Thomas J. Brogan =

American judge

Thomas J. Brogan (1889–1965) was a New Jersey jurist, and Chief Justice of the Supreme Court of New Jersey from 1933 through 1946.

== Biography ==
Brogan was born in County Meath, Ireland, educated at the College of Saint Francis Xavier and took his law degree from Fordham. Admitted to the bar in 1912, he rose to the position of Jersey City city counsel under powerful Democratic boss Mayor Frank Hague, and served there for eleven years. Brogan also appeared as Mayor Hague's personal attorney before the New Jersey Senate Case Committee.

Democratic Governor A. Harry Moore appointed Brogan as an associate justice of the Supreme Court in 1932, and promoted him to replace Chief Justice William Stryker Gummere less than a year later. In at least two instances of alleged voting fraud in the 1930s (Ferguson v. Brogan, 112 N.J.L. 471; Clee v. Moore, 119 N.J.L. 215; In re Clee, 119 N.J.L. 310), Brogan's court issued extraordinary rulings in favor of the Democratic machine, in one case asserting that the district superintendent of elections had no authority to open ballot boxes, and in another case ruling that the boxes could be opened, but no one had the right to look inside.

Chief Justice Brogan resigned in 1946, which made him the final Chief Justice before the reforming 1947 New Jersey Constitution. He is interred at Holy Name Cemetery, Jersey City.

Legal offices
Preceded by William Stryker Gummere	Chief Justice of the New Jersey Supreme Court; 1933–1946	Succeeded by Clarence Edward Case
