= Newton Hazelton Porter =

American judge (1877-1945)

Newton Hazelton Porter (April 13, 1877 – 1945) was a justice of the New Jersey Supreme Court from 1938 to 1945.

Hazelton was born on April 13, 1877, in Somerville, New Jersey, the son of Edward Baldwin and Emma Jane (Hazelton) Porter. He was educated at evening school and received Bachelor of Laws from New York University in 1902.

Admitted to New Jersey bar as attorney in 1904 and as counsellor in 1907. He practiced law from 1910 to 1924 until being appointed for judgeship. From 1921 to 1923, Porter served as the President of the New Jersey Chamber of Commerce.

He was a judge on the Court Common Pleas in Essex County from 1924 to 1926 and on the Circuit Court from 1926 to 1938. He was appointed to Supreme Court in 1938 and served until his death in 1945.

== See also ==
- List of justices of the Supreme Court of New Jersey
