= Michael Noriega =

American judge (born 1978)

Justice of the Supreme Court of New Jersey
- Incumbent
- Assumed office July 6, 2023
- Appointed by: Phil Murphy
- Preceded by: Barry T. Albin

Personal details
- Born: March 27, 1978 (age 48) Weehawken, New Jersey, U.S.
- Party: Democratic
- Education: Rutgers University (BA); Seton Hall University (JD)

Michael Noriega (born March 27, 1978) is an American attorney and jurist from the state of New Jersey. Noriega has served as a justice of the Supreme Court of New Jersey since 2023.

== Early life and education ==
Noriega is the son of Peruvian immigrants. Born in Weehawken, New Jersey, he grew up in Union City. Noriega graduated from St. Peter's Preparatory School in 1995, received a bachelor's degree from Rutgers University in 1999 with a major in American studies, and received a Juris Doctor from Seton Hall University School of Law in 2002.

== Career ==
Noriega worked as an assistant deputy public defender in Essex County for five years, leaving his position there in 2008. He practiced immigration law and criminal law for six years at his own law firm, Noriega & Associates, which was located in Newark. Noriega provided pro bono counsel to the organization Kids in Need of Defense, representing indigent, underage clients who had been subjected to human trafficking and were facing removal proceedings.

Noriega also worked as a partner at Bramnick, Rodriguez, Grabas, Arnold, and Mangan in Scotch Plains, where he specialized in immigration and criminal law. He was an adjunct professor at the Seton Hall School of Law for eight years. As of 2023, Noriega was an active member of the New Jersey State Bar Association and served as chair of the Immigration Law Section.

=== Supreme Court of New Jersey ===
On May 15, 2023, Governor Phil Murphy announced his intent to nominate Noriega to serve as a justice of the Supreme Court of New Jersey. There was a vacancy on the court due to the mandatory retirement of Justice Barry T. Albin, who retired on July 6, 2022; after Albin's retirement, the seat had been temporarily filled by New Jersey Superior Court, Appellate Division judge Jack M. Sabatino. In June 2023, it was reported that Noriega had received the support of enough senators to be confirmed, with 19 members of the State Senate having expressed their intent to vote for his confirmation. On June 26, 2023, a hearing was held on his nomination. Later that day, his nomination was advanced out of the Judiciary Committee.

Noriega was confirmed on June 30, 2023 by a 37–0 vote. He was sworn in on July 6, 2023. He is the first public defender to ever serve on the New Jersey Supreme Court. In addition, he is the third Hispanic to serve on the court and the first to do so since the retirement of Justice Faustino J. Fernandez-Vina.

== Personal life ==
Noriega is married to Melissa Noriega. The Noriegas have four children.

Noriega is a Democrat.

Legal offices
Preceded by Barry T. Albin	Justice of the Supreme Court of New Jersey; 2023–present	Incumbent
