= Frederic R. Colie =

American judge (1895–1974)

Frederic Runyon Colie (1895–1974) was a United States justice of the New Jersey Supreme Court from 1941 to 1948.

He was born in East Orange, New Jersey, on May 4, 1895. Cole served in the U.S. Army during World War I. He graduated from New York University School of Law. He was a member of Alpha Delta Phi, Phi Delta Phi, and the Freemasons.

He was Associate Justice of New Jersey Supreme Court from 1941 to 1948, originally nominated by Charles Edison, the Governor of New Jersey. After the Constitution of New Jersey was re-written in 1947, he was appointed to serve the New Jersey Superior Court, which he did from 1948 to 1961.

Colie has resided in Short Hills, New Jersey. He wrote An Exercise in Nostalgia, a history of Mantoloking from 1880 to 1920, published in 1970. He died at Saint Barnabas Medical Center in Livingston on May 30, 1974.

== See also ==
- List of justices of the Supreme Court of New Jersey
