= Harry Heher =

American judge (1889–1972)

Harry Heher (March 20, 1889 – October 17, 1972) was a New Jersey Supreme Court Justice and Democratic Party leader.

He was born in 1889 in Trenton, New Jersey to John and Anne (Spelman) Heher. He attended the Cathedral School and Trenton High School, graduating in 1907. He read law with a Trenton attorney, and admitted to the New Jersey bar in 1911.

Heher served as chairman of the Mercer County Democratic Committee from 1915 to 1922, succeeding to chairman of the New Jersey Democratic State Committee from 1922 to 1932. In 1932 he was appointed by Governor A. Harry Moore as an associate justice of the New Jersey Court of Errors and Appeals, known after 1947 as the New Jersey Supreme Court, and reappointed followed in 1940, 1947, and 1954.

Heher married Anne Egan on August 5, 1925, and they had three sons: Harry Heher, Jr. (b. 1927), John Robert Heher (b. 1930), and Garrett Martin Heher (b. 1935). He died in Lawrenceville, New Jersey in 1972 at the age of 83.

Party political offices
| Preceded by Charles F. McDonald | Chairman of the New Jersey Democratic State Committee; 1922 – 1932 | Succeeded by Mary Teresa Norton |
