= George Theodore Werts =

American politician

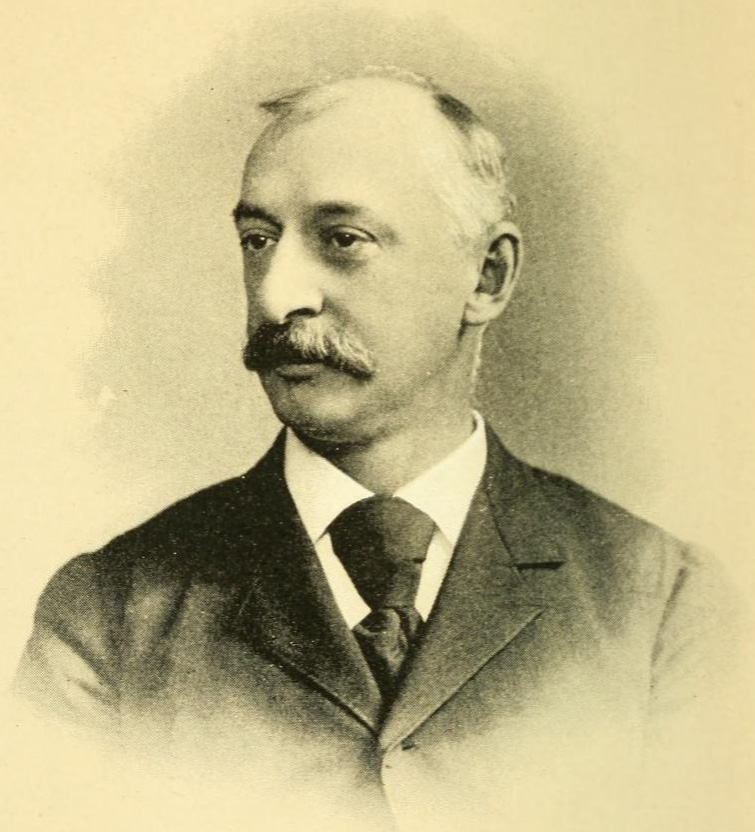

28th Governor of New Jersey
- In office January 17, 1893 – January 21, 1896
- Preceded by: Leon Abbett
- Succeeded by: John W. Griggs

President of the New Jersey Senate
- In office 1889–1890
- Preceded by: George H. Large
- Succeeded by: Henry M. Nevius

Member of the New Jersey Senate from Morris County
- In office 1887–1893
- Preceded by: James C. Youngblood
- Succeeded by: Elias C. Drake

Mayor of Morristown, New Jersey
- In office 1886–1892
- Preceded by: James Sullivan
- Succeeded by: George T. Cobb

Personal details
- Born: March 24, 1846 Hackettstown, New Jersey
- Died: January 17, 1910 (aged 63) Jersey City, New Jersey
- Party: Democratic
- Spouse: Emma Stelle

George Theodore Werts (March 24, 1846 – January 17, 1910) was an American attorney, judge, and Democratic Party politician who served as the 28th governor of New Jersey from 1893 to 1896.

His term in Governor coincided with the precipitous decline of the New Jersey Democratic Party amid the Panic of 1893 and growing ethnoreligious divisions in the state. Werts created the Palisades Interstate Park Commission which saved the New Jersey Palisades from being quarried for their rock.

== Early life ==
George Theodore Werts was born on March 24, 1846, in Hackettstown, New Jersey. He attended public schools in Bordentown and completed his education at the State Model School in Trenton.

== Early legal and political career ==
In 1863, Werts moved to Morristown, New Jersey to study law with his uncle, Jacob Vanatta, a former Attorney General of New Jersey. After four years of study, he was admitted to the bar and established a law office in Morristown. He practiced there for sixteen years, building a lucrative practice and gaining a reputation for integrity and skill at trial.

Although Morristown was largely Republican at the time, Werts was elected recorder in 1883. In 1886, he was elected both mayor and Senator for Morris County.

=== State senator ===
Werts served two terms in the State Senate from 1887 to 1893. He focused his efforts in the Senate on election reform and a local option on liquor regulation. Both were politically motivated and ineffectual, but brought him to the attention of Governor Leon Abbett.

In February 1892, Abbett appointed Werts to fill the vacant seat of Manning M. Knapp on the Hudson County circuit of the New Jersey Supreme Court, in order to prevent Werts from obstructing his campaign for the United States Senate.

== Governor of New Jersey ==
=== 1892 election ===
Werts was nominated for Governor in 1892 on the first ballot of the Democratic convention with Abbett's support, beating out Edward C. Young and Job Lippincott.

In the general election, he faced U.S. Representative John Kean, a member of the influential Kean family of Republicans. Kean campaigned against the Abbett administration's record, condemning Democratic election fraud, graft, and subservience to liquor and gambling interests. Werts did not play an active part in the campaign, instead deferring to party chair Allan L. McDermott. McDermott chose not to answer the charge of corruption and instead focused the race on national issues and opposition to President Benjamin Harrison. In a state which had only voted for the Republican nominee for President once before that point, the strategy was successful. Grover Cleveland easily won the state, and Werts was elected governor, albeit with a margin almost half that of Cleveland's.

=== Term in office ===
In his inaugural address, Werts proposed expanding prison facilities, creating a juvenile reformatory, and passing ballot-reform legislation. The focus of his remarks was responding to critics who called for anti-trust legislation in New Jersey. "The distinction appears to be," he observed, "that where the restraint of combination is ... simply the natural consequence and not the intent, the combination is not improper; where the object is to destroy competition and obtain control of ... production ... such combination is unlawful." Werts pledged a continuation of the Democratic policy in the state of encouraging combination through liberal incorporation laws.

The 1893 legislature passed an unpopular bill to legalize racetrack gambling. Though Werts vetoed the bill, opponents blamed Werts's haste for preventing effective mobilization against gambling interests. The legislature passed the bill again, overriding his veto.

==== 1893 election and constitutional crisis ====
In the fall elections, the Republicans won an overwhelming 30,000 vote majority and gained control of the Assembly and Senate. Republicans, backed mostly by evangelical Protestant opponents of gambling, also won votes in opposition to Catholic efforts to pass public funding for parochial schools and public concern amidst the Panic of 1893. Republicans carried the urban counties of Hudson, Essex, and Passaic, and seven of the state's ten largest cities.

Instead of accepting the results, the Democratic minority organized a rump session and refused to certify the elections. They advised Werts of their intention, and he acquiesced. The state constitutional crisis, with two functioning Senates, lasted until March 1894 until the Supreme Court ruled the rump session illegal.

The 1894 legislature was dominated by Republican attempts to remove Democratic officeholders from appointed positions and restrict religious teaching in public schools. The unsuccessful Democratic campaign of 1894 attempt to identify Republicans with prohibition and anti-Catholic organizations like the American Protective Association; they won only a few seats.

Werts's annual message to the legislature in 1895 reiterated his support for prison expansion and ballot reform, adding a call for water conservation. None of these measures were enacted. Instead, the legislature passed the Storrs Naturalization Act, which prohibited naturalization in the final month before an election, over the governor's veto. The legislature also undertook investigations into corruption among former Democratic officials, who were revealed to have sold pardons and accepted bribes and kickbacks from construction companies.

Werts left office in 1896 after the election of John W. Griggs, the first Republican governor since 1869. He left a budget surplus of almost $1 million.

== Personal life ==
In 1872, Werts married Emma Stelle. They had two daughters and she served as an important political and social advisor during his career.

In 1893, Werts was elected as an honorary member of the New Jersey Society of the Cincinnati.

== Later life and death ==
After leaving office in 1896, Werts retired to Jersey City and resumed the practice of law.

He died on January 17, 1910, at age 63. At that point, he was the most recent Democratic Governor of New Jersey. He was buried in Evergreen Cemetery in Morristown.

Political offices
Preceded by George H. Large	President of the New Jersey Senate; 1889	Succeeded by Henry M. Nevius
Preceded by Leon Abbett	Governor of New Jersey; January 17, 1893 – January 21, 1896	Succeeded by John W. Griggs
Party political offices
Preceded by Leon Abbett	Democratic Nominee for Governor of New Jersey; 1892	Succeeded by Alexander T. McGill
