= Education segregation in New Jersey =

New Jersey has some of the most segregated schools in the United States. Despite laws promoting school integration since 1881, a 2017 study by the UCLA Civil Rights Project found that New Jersey has the sixth-most segregated classrooms in the United States.

New Jersey has substantially smaller school districts per capita than other states, effectively dividing attendance by municipality. As a result, the proportion of highly segregated schools in New Jersey increased by two-thirds between 1989 and 2010, from 4.8% to 8%.

== Background ==
New Jersey, the most densely populated state in the country, with the second highest per capita income, has a well-developed public school system. A change to its constitution in 1947 outlawed overt segregation in schools, a decade before Brown v. Board of Education.

In 1941, New Jersey had seventy districts with some form of formal segregation. Most of the segregation was in South Jersey, which was largely agricultural at the time. There was some in Bergen County, close to New York, where the average black classroom had 59 students.

After World War II and the promulgation of the 1947 constitution, legally sanctioned segregation mostly went by the boards. That same constitution retained the state's commitment to home rule -- that townships and municipalities are the primary form of local government. Counties are relatively weak in New Jersey. The diversity of schools in New Jersey is a reflection of the communities they serve. In New Jersey there were 568 municipalities and 590 school districts in 2017.

The Bordentown School (officially known as the Manual Training and Industrial School for Colored Youth), was a residential, publicly financed co-ed boarding school for African-American children in Bordentown. The school was known as the "Tuskegee of the North" for its adoption of many of the educational practices first developed at the Tuskegee Institute. Founded in 1886 and closed in 1955, the 400-acre (160 ha) campus included two farms and 30 trade buildings.

== Studies ==
Since 1996, the relative segregation of classrooms across the United States has been studied by the Civil Rights Project at Harvard until 2007 and subsequently at the Graduate School of Education and Information Studies at UCLA. The first report on New Jersey was published in 2012. The second was published in 2017.

== Findings ==
Racial isolation for Latino students increased in the period 1989-2010. Black students had less isolation in some areas and persistent segregation in others.

New Jersey has taken steps to equalize spending in the various school districts, including subsidies to 31 largely urban Abbott districts.

== Contrast with the nation, region, and other states ==
New Jersey has the sixth-most segregated classrooms in the United States.

== Initiatives ==
New Jersey was, for the most part, not affected by court-ordered busing in the 1960s and 1970s.

In Latino Action Network v. New Jersey, activists sued the state.

== See also ==
- Desegregation busing
