= Barry T. Albin =

American judge (born 1952)

Associate Justice of the New Jersey Supreme Court
- In office September 18, 2002 – July 6, 2022
- Appointed by: Jim McGreevey
- Preceded by: Gary Saul Stein
- Succeeded by: Michael Noriega

Personal details
- Born: July 7, 1952 (age 73) Brooklyn, New York, U.S.
- Party: Democratic
- Spouse: Inna Albin
- Education: Rutgers University (BA); Cornell University (JD)

Barry Todd Albin (born July 7, 1952) is an American lawyer and former judge from New Jersey. He served as an associate justice of the New Jersey Supreme Court from 2002 to 2022. A Democrat, Albin is noted for his jurisprudence in New Jersey's criminal law, in which his opinions would frequently favor the due-process rights of criminal defendants. He stepped down from the court on July 6, 2022, a day prior to turning 70, New Jersey's mandatory retirement age for judges. The final opinion he wrote involved how municipalities may fill vacated seats.

== Biography ==
Albin was born on July 7, 1952, in Brooklyn, to Gerald, a pressman for The New York Times, and Norma Albin. He grew up in Bayside, Queens, New York, and Sayreville, New Jersey, where he graduated from Sayreville War Memorial High School in 1970. He graduated from Rutgers University in 1973 and Cornell Law School in 1976. After graduation, he started a career as a Deputy Attorney General in the Appellate Section of the New Jersey Division of Criminal Justice. After this career, he became Assistant Prosecutor in Passaic and Middlesex counties, which he held from 1978 to 1982. He then joined the firm of Wilentz, Goldman & Spitzer P.A., becoming partner in 1986.

Albin served as a member of the New Jersey Supreme Court Criminal Practice Committee from 1987 until 1992, and gained the honor of being selected by peers to have his name included in the "Best Lawyers in America" (2000–2001). He became the president of the New Jersey Association of Criminal Defense Lawyers, a position he held from 1999 to 2000.

Albin was nominated by Governor James E. McGreevey on July 10, 2002, as a justice in the New Jersey Supreme Court. He was confirmed on September 12 of the same year and was sworn in on September 18, 2002.

On May 15, 2009, Governor Jon Corzine renominated Albin, whose initial seven-year term would have expired on September 18, 2009. Albin's re-appointment was cleared by the Senate on June 26, 2009.

Following his mandatory retirement from the court, Albin became a partner at Lowenstein Sandler, joining the litigation department and chairing the firm's appellate practice group.

Barry Albin and his wife, Inna Albin, have two sons, Gerald and Daniel.
