= Arthur T. Vanderbilt =

American judge

Chief Justice of the New Jersey Supreme Court
- In office 1948 – June 16, 1957
- Nominated by: Alfred E. Driscoll
- Preceded by: Clarence E. Case
- Succeeded by: Joseph Weintraub

Dean of New York University School of Law
- In office 1943–1948
- Preceded by: Frank Sommer
- Succeeded by: Russell D. Niles

President of the American Bar Association
- In office 1937–1938
- Preceded by: Frederick Harold Stinchfield
- Succeeded by: Frank J. Hogan

Personal details
- Born: July 7, 1888 Newark, New Jersey, U.S.
- Died: June 16, 1957 (aged 68) Summit, New Jersey, U.S.
- Education: Wesleyan University (BA); Columbia Law School (LLB)

Arthur T. Vanderbilt (July 7, 1888 – June 16, 1957) was an American judge and judicial reformer. He served as Chief Justice of the New Jersey Supreme Court from 1948 to 1957, the first Chief Justice under the revamped New Jersey court system established by the Constitution of 1947, in which the Supreme Court replaced the Court of Errors and Appeals as the highest court. He also was an attorney, legal educator and proponent of court modernization.

== Early years and education ==
Vanderbilt was born on July 7, 1888, in Newark, New Jersey, to Louis and Alice H. (née Leach) Vanderbilt. He had one sibling, a younger brother named Leslie. He attended Newark (now Barringer) High School where he was class president, editor of the newspaper, and a member of two fraternal groups, The Ramblers (later Omega Gamma Delta) and Lambda Tau. Following high school he took off a year to work on the railroad to earn money for college.

He attended Wesleyan University, where he was a member of Delta Kappa Epsilon, president of the student body, and was elected to Phi Beta Kappa. A sidelight of his Wesleyan career was the inauguration of President William A. Shanklin. Vanderbilt was one of the inauguration speakers, along with U. S. President William Howard Taft, and then startled Taft by showing up later as a waiter at the inaugural dinner. Vanderbilt then attended Columbia University School of Law, graduating in 1913 with a LL.B.

== Career ==
Many of Vanderbilt's ideas for court reform had been incorporated into the new judicial article of the New Jersey Constitution. One of those innovations was the designation of the Chief Justice as the administrative head of all courts in the state, replacing the previous system of almost completely autonomous courts. As Chief Justice, he created the first state Administrative Office of the Courts in the nation.

An appreciation of the changes brought to the New Jersey judicial system can be gained from a comparison between the structure of the courts before the new constitution and after. There were over 20 different courts in the system (e.g.-superior court, supreme court, court of errors and appeals, chancery, oyer & terminer, orphan's court, county court, general sessions, quarter sessions, etc.) which were replaced by the New Jersey Supreme Court, the Superior Court (Law, Chancery and Appellate Divisions), County Court, County District Court and the Juvenile and Domestic Relations Court. The County Courts were merged into the Superior Court, Law Division, as were the County District Courts, now known as the Special Civil Part of the Superior Court, and the Juvenile and Domestic Relations Court, now the Family Part of the Chancery Division. These were joined by the Tax Court. In addition, there are Municipal Courts which handled minor criminal and ordinance violations.

In the new practice, if an action is filed in the wrong court there is a procedure to transfer the matter to the proper court. Previously, filing the action in the wrong court was a fatal defect if the matter was dismissed for lack of jurisdiction. Professor John Lynch, who taught Constitutional Law and New Jersey Practice at the Seton Hall School of Law in the 1970s and 1980s, told the apocryphal story of a politically sensitive case in the 1930s or 1940s, in which the plaintiffs feared that the court would find it had no jurisdiction in order to avoid the political consequences of ruling in the plaintiff's favor. To avoid this, the plaintiff filed the action separately in all 20+ courts, only to have each court rule that it lacked jurisdiction to hear the matter. Professor Lynch claimed to be constantly in search of the actual case; it is not known if he was ultimately successful.

Vanderbilt was President of the American Bar Association in 1937–38. He also served for many years as Dean of New York University Law School, currently housed in a building that bears his name. Vanderbilt was a delegate to the Republican National Convention in 1936, 1940 and 1944. In 1951, he founded Scribes—The American Society of Writers on Legal Subjects, an organization dedicated to improving the quality of legal writing.

On two separate occasions, Vanderbilt declined to be considered for nominations to the U.S. Supreme Court. Vanderbilt was the principal mentor to William J. Brennan Jr. when Brennan was a member of the New Jersey Supreme Court and played an instrumental role in Dwight D. Eisenhower's nomination of Brennan to the United States Supreme Court.

== Publications ==
Vanderbilt authored many articles and a number of books, including:

- Men and Measures in the Law
- The Challenge of Legal Reform
- The Doctrine of the Separation of Powers and Its Present-Day Significance
- Judges and Jurors
- Improving The Administration of Justice

== Honorable distinctions ==
For his work in law reform, he was awarded 32 honorary degrees and the American Bar Association Medal.

== Death ==
A resident of Millburn, New Jersey, Vanderbilt had a heart attack while parking his car at the Lackawanna Railroad station in Short Hills, New Jersey, on June 14, 1957. He lingered for two days, and died at 1:20 A.M. at Overlook Hospital in Summit, New Jersey. His funeral was held at Christ Protestant Episcopal Church in Short Hills, and he was buried at Restland Memorial Park in East Hanover, New Jersey.

== Personal life ==
Vanderbilt married Florence J. Althen in 1914. They had five children: William, Robert, Jean, Virginia, and Lois.

His grandson, Arthur T. Vanderbilt, II, is an attorney, author, avid gardener, partner in a New Jersey law firm, and former deputy attorney general of New Jersey. One of his books is Fortune's Children: The Fall of the House of Vanderbilt (1989)

== External resources ==
- "Register of the Arthur T. Vanderbilt Political, Professional, and Judicial Papers, 1902 – 1957". Special Collections and Archives Olin Library, Wesleyan University. Middletown, Connecticut.

Legal offices
| Preceded by First Chief Justice under 1947 Constitution | Chief Justice of the New Jersey Supreme Court; 1948–1957 | Succeeded by Joseph Weintraub |
