= Pierre P. Garven =

American judge

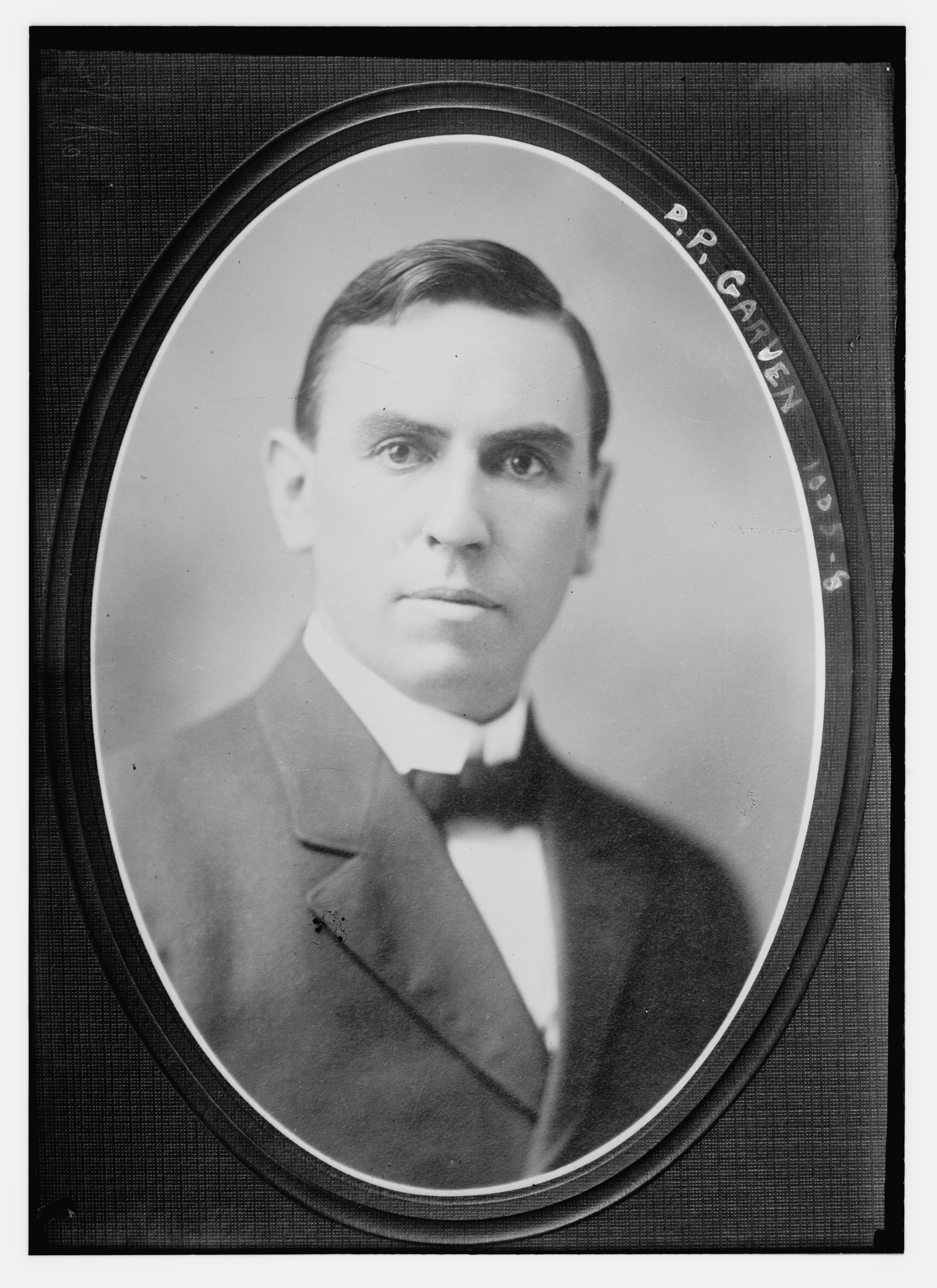

Chief Justice of the Supreme Court of New Jersey
- In office September 1, 1973 – October 19, 1973

Personal details
- Born: Pierre Prosper Garven, Jr. October 27, 1925
- Died: October 19, 1973 (aged 47)
- Parent: Pierre P. Garven

Pierre Prosper Garven, Jr. (October 27, 1925 – October 19, 1973) was an American judge who was Chief Justice of the New Jersey Supreme Court for seven weeks in 1973.

Son of Bayonne mayor Pierre P. Garven, Garven was appointed by Governor of New Jersey William T. Cahill, after having served as an associate justice of the same court for several months.

He took office as chief justice on September 1, 1973. Garven died of a stroke on October 19, 1973. He was survived by five children and his wife, Sandra. Garven was succeeded as Chief Justice by Richard J. Hughes, the only person ever to serve as both Governor and chief justice of New Jersey.

Legal offices
Preceded by Joseph Weintraub	Chief Justice of the New Jersey Supreme Court; 1973	Succeeded by Richard J. Hughes
