= Nathan L. Jacobs =

American judge (1905–1989)

Nathan L. Jacobs (February 28, 1905 – January 25, 1989) was a justice of the New Jersey Supreme Court in 1948 and from 1952 to 1975. Jacobs was raised in Bayonne. After graduating the University of Pennsylvania, he went on to receive bachelor's and doctoral degrees from Harvard Law School. He was law partner of Arthur T. Vanderbilt from 1928 to 1934 and later in his firm Frazer, Stoffer & Jacobs, where he remained until he went on the bench.

From 1934 to 1939 he was chief deputy commissioner of the State Alcoholic Beverage Control Commission, and for three years during World War II he was district enforcement attorney for the Office of Price Administration. He taught administrative law at Rutgers School of Law from 1929 to 1948. He was delegate to New Jersey state constitutional convention in 1947.

Governor Alfred E. Driscoll appointed him to the Supreme Court in 1948, before the revised court organization took effect. Later that year, Chief Justice Vanderbilt named him judge of the New Jersey Superior Court and sat in the Appellate Division. In 1952, Governor Driscoll again named him to the Supreme Court, where served until his retirement in 1975.

Jacobs resided in Livingston, New Jersey.

== See also ==
- List of justices of the Supreme Court of New Jersey
