= C. Thomas Schettino =

American judge (1907–1983)

C. Thomas Schettino (September 9, 1907 – March 21, 1983) was a justice of the New Jersey Supreme Court from 1959 to 1972.

Schettino was born in Newark on September 9, 1906. He grew up in East Orange and attended East Orange High School. He attended Rutgers University where he was a member of Tau Kappa Epsilon fraternity, and graduated from there in 1930. Schettino then received a law degree from Columbia Law School in 1933. He was a member of the law department of the Port Authority of New York and New Jersey from 1936 until 1941, when he joined Rutgers as an instructor in business law.

From 1942 to 1944, he was executive clerk and secretary to Governor of New Jersey Charles Edison. He then practiced law until he was named to the Court of Errors and Appeals, the predecessor to the Supreme Court, from 1944 to 1947 before the rewriting of the Constitution of New Jersey. He served the New Jersey Superior Court from 1948 to 1959. Justice Schettino was appointed to Supreme Court in 1959 by Governor Robert B. Meyner and served until 1972, an era known as the Weintraub Court.

He died at Overlook Hospital in Summit, where he lived. He is interred in Holy Sepulchre Cemetery (East Orange, New Jersey).

== See also ==
- List of justices of the Supreme Court of New Jersey
