= Clarence E. Case =

American judge

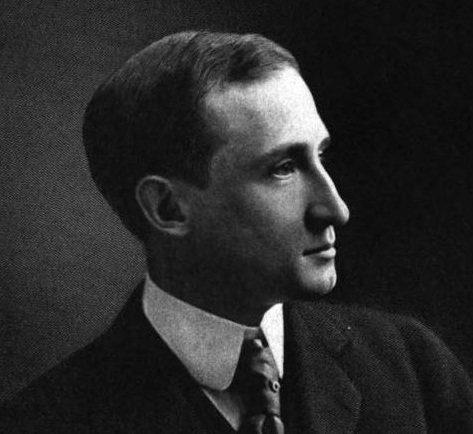

Acting Governor of New Jersey
- In office January 13, 1920 – January 20, 1920
- Preceded by: William Nelson Runyon (acting)
- Succeeded by: Edward I. Edwards as Governor

Chief Justice of the New Jersey Supreme Court
- In office 1945–1948
- Preceded by: Thomas J. Brogan
- Succeeded by: Arthur T. Vanderbilt

Member of the New Jersey Senate from Somerset County
- In office 1918-1929

Personal details
- Born: Clarence Edwards Case; September 24, 1877 Jersey City, New Jersey
- Died: September 3, 1961 (aged 83) Somerville, New Jersey
- Party: Republican
- Spouse(s): Anna Gist Rogers; Mrs. Ruth Weldon Griggs
- Relations: Clifford P. Case (nephew)

Clarence Edwards Case (September 24, 1877– September 3, 1961) was an American lawyer, jurist, and Republican Party politician from New Jersey. He represented Somerset County in the New Jersey Senate from 1918 to 1929 and served as a justice of the Supreme Court of New Jersey from 1929 to 1948, including as chief justice from 1945 to 1948.

== Early life and education ==
Clarence Edwards Case was born on September 24, 1877 in Jersey City, New Jersey to Philip and Amanda V. (née Edwards) Case.

Case attended the Rogers & Magie Classical Scientific School in Paterson before transferring to Rutgers Preparatory School, where he graduated in 1896.

He graduated from Rutgers University, where he was a member of Delta Upsilon and Phi Beta Kappa, in 1900. He studied law at New York Law School until 1902.

== Legal and political career ==
Case was admitted to the bar as an attorney in November 1903 and as a counselor in February 1907.

From 1908 to 1910, Case was clerk of the New Jersey Senate Committee on the Judiciary. In 1910, Governor John Franklin Fort appointed Case as a presiding judge of the Somerset County Court of Common Pleas, where he served until 1913.

In 1917, Case was elected to the New Jersey Senate representing Somerset County. He served from 1918 to 1929, when he resigned to be appointed to the Supreme Court of New Jersey. As Senate president, he served as acting governor from January 13 to 20, 1920, the week between the end of the term of acting governor William Nelson Runyon and the start of Edward I. Edwards' term as governor.

Case served on the New Jersey Supreme Court from 1929 to 1952, and was the Chief Justice from 1946 to 1948.

== Personal life ==
Case married Anna Gist Rogers in Lexington, Kentucky on January 29, 1913. Their daughter, Henrietta Rogers Case, was born February 17, 1914. They also had two sons, Clarence Jr. (born May 26, 1916) and Philip III (born November 26, 1917).

He was a member of the Freemasons, the Elks, the Knights of Pythias, and Somerville Country Club. His nephew, Clifford Case, represented New Jersey in the United States House of Representatives from 1945 to 1953 and the United States Senate from 1955 to 1979.

Case died on September 3, 1961, in Somerville, New Jersey, where he resided after retiring.

== See also ==
- List of governors of New Jersey

Political offices
Preceded by William Nelson Runyon; Acting Governor	Acting Governor of New Jersey; 1920	Succeeded by Edward I. Edwards; Governor
Preceded by William Nelson Runyon	President of the New Jersey Senate; 1920	Succeeded by Collins B. Allen
Legal offices
Preceded by Thomas J. Brogan	Chief Justice of the New Jersey Supreme Court; 1948–1952	Succeeded by Arthur T. Vanderbilt
