= New Jersey Court of Common Pleas =

The New Jersey Court of Common Pleas was a civil court of general jurisdiction, which existed in New Jersey from 1704 until 1947.

The Court of Common Pleas was established by an ordinance promoted by New Jersey's first royal governor Edward Hyde, Lord Cornbury, and modeled on a similar ordinance passed in New York in the previous decade. When the courts of New Jersey were established under this ordinance, the English name of Court of Common Pleas, already used in West New Jersey, was given to the civil side of the County Court or Court of Sessions. The ordinance provided that justices of the peace would have jurisdiction over civil cases of debt or trespass to the value of forty shillings, with power to determine such cases without a jury, subject to an appeal to the Justices at the next Court of Sessions in cases for over twenty shillings. Next there was established a Court of Common Pleas to be held in each county at the place where the general Court of Sessions is usually kept, to "begin immediately after the Sessions of the Peace does end and terminate". It was thus assumed rather than ordained that the judges of the Common Pleas should be the same as the judges of the sessions, and these latter had always been the justices of the peace of the county. The Court of Common Pleas was given general civil jurisdiction at common law, and there was a right of appeal or removal where the judgment was more than twenty pounds, and in cases where the title to land came in question.

Successive ordinances preserved this court through the American Revolution and the establishment of the United States. The Courts of Common Pleas were eliminated when the most recent New Jersey State Constitution was adopted in 1947.
