= Joseph Weintraub =

American judge (1908–1977)

Chief Justice of the Supreme Court of New Jersey
- In office 1957–1973

Associate Justice of the Supreme Court of New Jersey
- In office 1956–1957

Personal details
- Born: 1908
- Died: 1977 (aged 68–69)
- Education: Cornell Law School
- Occupation: Judge

Joseph Weintraub (1908–1977) was an American judge who graduated from Cornell Law School in 1930 and was Chief Justice of the New Jersey Supreme Court from 1957 to 1973. He previously served as an associate justice of the same court from 1956 to 1957. Weintraub was Jewish.

Among the opinions authored by Weintraub is State v. Abbott (1961), a landmark ruling that established the duty to retreat in New Jersey.

== See also ==
- List of Jewish American jurists
- List of justices of the Supreme Court of New Jersey

Legal offices
Preceded by Arthur T. Vanderbilt	Chief Justice of the New Jersey Supreme Court; 1957–1973	Succeeded by Pierre P. Garven
