= Courts of New Jersey =

Courts of New Jersey include:

State courts of New Jersey

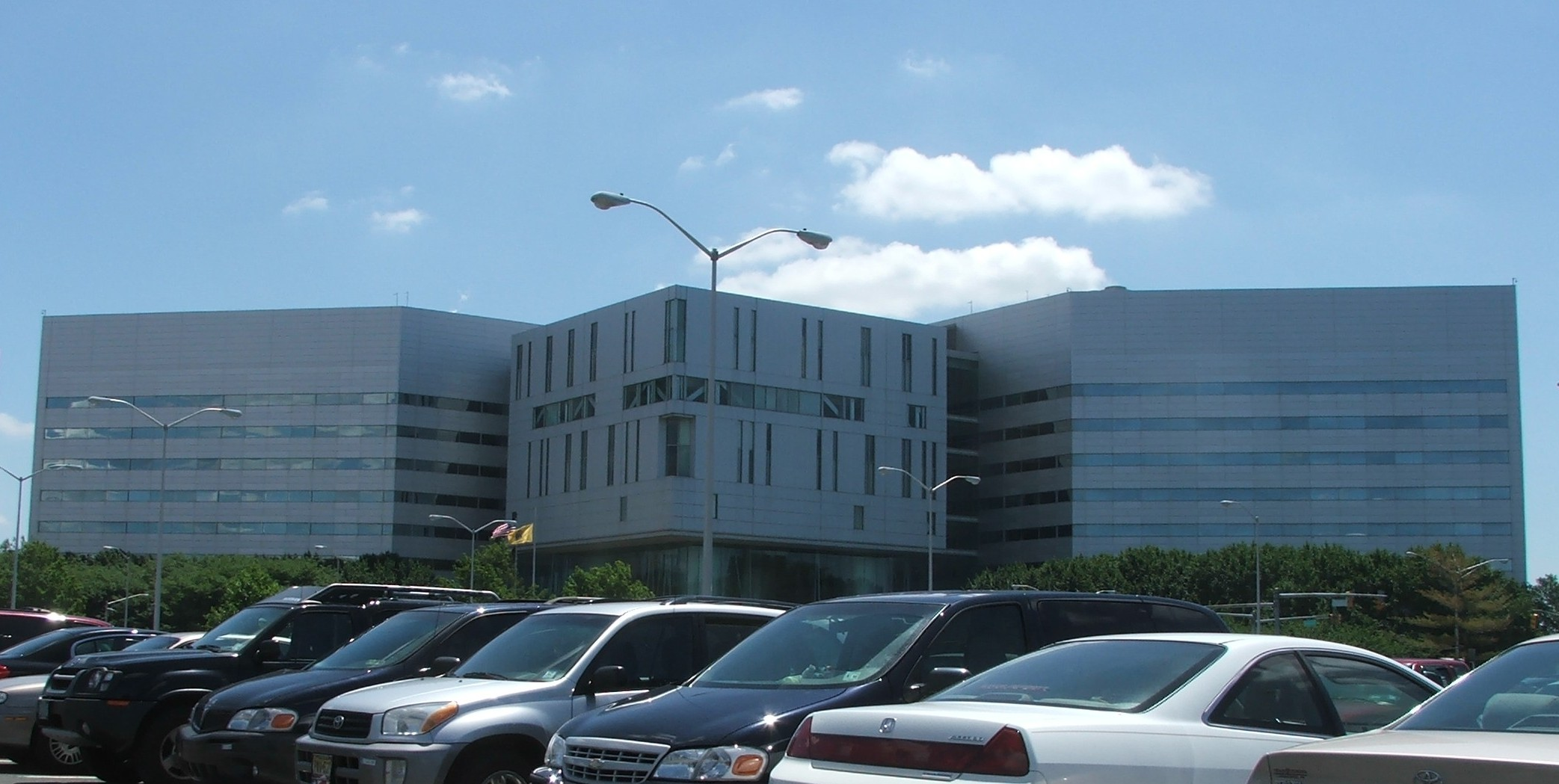
Richard J. Hughes Justice Complex, Trenton, New Jersey: The seat of the New Jersey Supreme Court and the central administrative offices of all statewide courts in New Jersey.

- New Jersey Supreme Court (previously the New Jersey Court of Errors and Appeals)
  - New Jersey Superior Court (including the Appellate Division; 15 vicinages)
  - New Jersey Tax Court
  - New Jersey Municipal Courts (including Joint Municipal Courts and the Court of the Palisades Interstate Park)

Federal courts located in New Jersey

- United States District Court for the District of New Jersey

Former federal courts of New Jersey

- United States District Court for the District of East Jersey (1801–1802; extinct, merged)
- United States District Court for the District of West Jersey (1801–1802; extinct, merged)

== See also ==
- Judiciary of New Jersey
- Richard J. Hughes Justice Complex
- List of justices of the Supreme Court of New Jersey
- List of United States federal courthouses in New Jersey
- County courthouses in New Jersey
- United States Attorney for the District of New Jersey
- New Jersey Court of Common Pleas
