= New Jersey Court of Errors and Appeals =

Former New Jersey court

Before the judicial reforms introduced by the New Jersey Constitution of 1947, the state's judiciary consisted of 17 courts with overlapping jurisdictions, including the Court of Errors and Appeals, which served as the state's highest appellate court.

The Court of Errors and Appeals was the highest court in the U.S. state of New Jersey from 1844 until September 15, 1948, when the judicial provisions of the state's 1947 constitution took effect. The name of the court derived from its function of hearing appeals and correcting previous courts errors in judgment. The court was abolished by the 1947 constitution, and replaced as the state's highest court by the New Jersey Supreme Court. "In the absence of Supreme Court authority, decisions of the former Court of Errors & Appeals are binding on the Appellate Division and all trial divisions of the Superior Court, including the municipal court and Tax Court, and on all administrative agencies."

The Court of Errors and Appeals consisted of the Chancellor, the justices of the Supreme Court and six part-time judges. The six additional judges were appointed by the governor with the advice and consent of the Senate. They served six-year terms, staggered so that one seat became vacant each year.

The court heard final appeals in both common law and equity cases, including appeals from the Court of Chancery and the Supreme Court. The chancellor could not participate in appeals from his own decisions, and Supreme Court justices were barred from reviewing cases in which they had previously ruled.

During that period, the Supreme Court was the intermediate appellate court for New Jersey, and its justices also presided over county-level courts, as well as serving on the Court of Errors and Appeals. The 1947 Constitution established a new Supreme Court as the highest level of the judicial system, with the appellate and trial-level judges placed in the new Superior Court.

== See also ==
- Courts of New Jersey
- List of justices of the Supreme Court of New Jersey

== Sources ==
- New Jersey Constitution of 1844, at Wikisource
