= Governorship of Chris Christie =

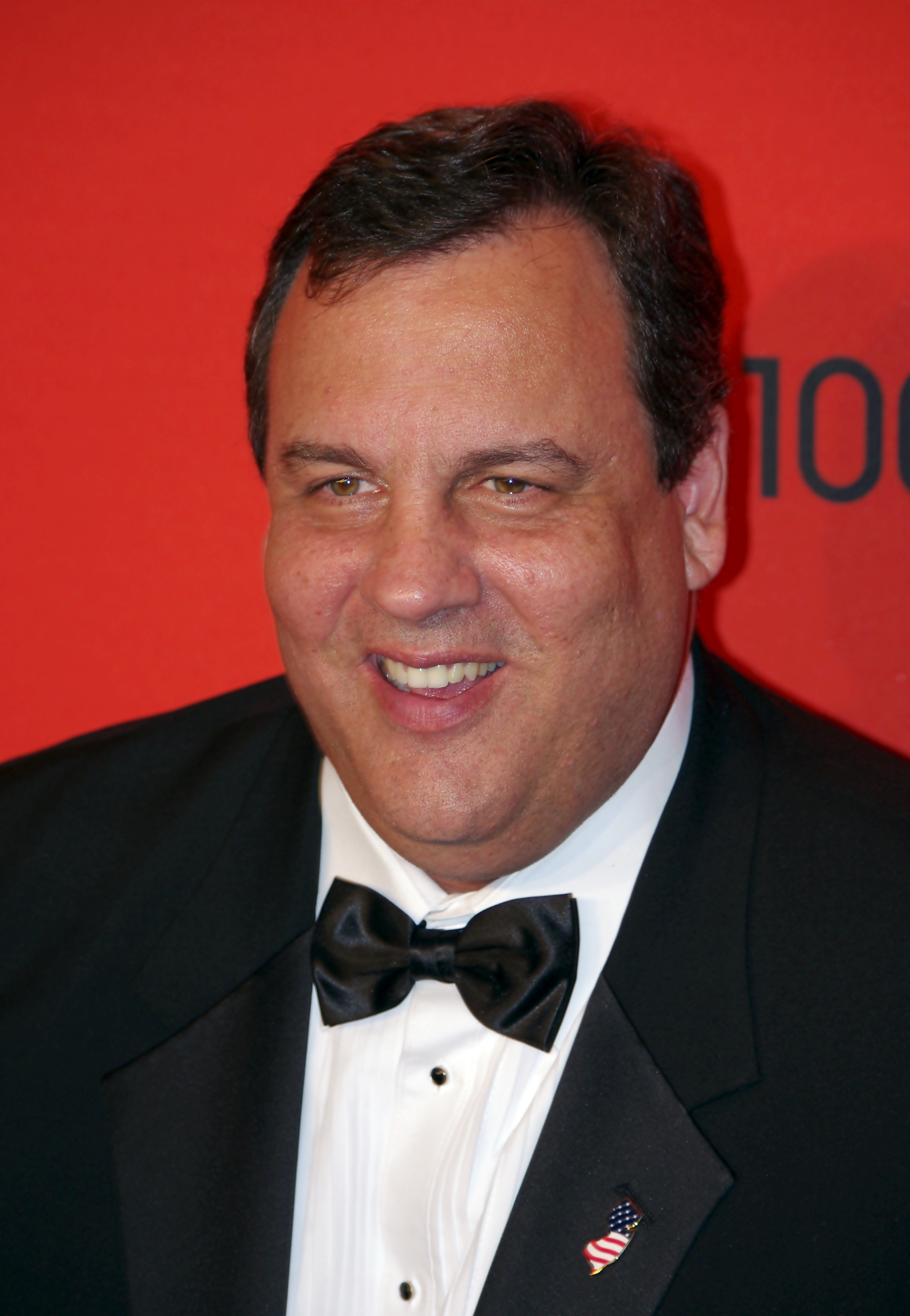
- Governorship of Chris Christie; January 19, 2010 – January 16, 2018
- Party: Republican
- Election: 2009; 2013
- Seat: Drumthwacket
- Seal of New Jersey

Chris Christie took office as the 55th governor of New Jersey on January 19, 2010, began his second term on January 21, 2014, and left office on January 16, 2018.

== Cabinet ==
The Christie Cabinet
Office	Name	Term
Governor	Chris Christie	2010–2018
Lieutenant Governor	Kim Guadagno	2010–2018
Adjutant General	Maj. Gen. Glenn K. Rieth	2010–2011
Michael Cunniff	2011–2018
Secretary of Agriculture	Douglas H. Fisher	2010–2018
Attorney General	Paula Dow	2010–2012
Jeffrey S. Chiesa	2012–2013
John Jay Hoffman	2013–2014
Robert Lougy	2014–2016
Christopher Porrino	2016–2018
Commissioner of Banking and Insurance	Tom Considine	2010–2011
Kenneth E. Kobylowski	2012–2015
Richard J. Badolato	2015–2018 (acting)
Commissioner of Children and Families	Dr. Allison Blake	2010–2018
Commissioner of Community Affairs	Lori Grifa	2010–2012
Richard E. Constable III	2012–2015
Charles Richman	2015–2018 (acting)
Commissioner of Corrections	Gary Lanigan	2010–2018
Commissioner of Education	Bret D. Schundler	2010–2010
Rochelle Hendricks*	2010–2011
Christopher D. Cerf*	2011–2014
David C. Hespe	2014–2018
Commissioner of Environmental Protection	Bob Martin	2010–2018
Commissioner of Health and Senior Services	Dr. Poonam Alaigh	2010–2011
Mary O'Dowd*	2011–2015
Cathleen Bennett	2011–2018 (acting)
Commissioner of Human Services	Jennifer Velez	2010–2015
Elizabeth Connelly	2010–2018 (acting)
Commissioner of Labor and Workforce; Development	Harold J. Wirths	2010–2016
Aaron R. Fichtner	2016–2018
Secretary of State	Kim Guadagno	2010–2018
Commissioner of Transportation	Jim Simpson	2010–2014
Joseph Bertoni*	2014–2014
Jamie Fox	2014–2015
Richard Hammer	2015–2018 (acting)
State Treasurer	Andrew Sidamon-Eristoff	2010–2015
Robert A. Romano	2015–present (acting)
Chair/Chief Executive Officer of the Civil Service Commission	Robert Czech	2010–2018
Director of the Office of Homeland; Security and Preparedness	Charles B. McKenna	2010–2012
Edward Dickson	2012–2014
Chris Rodriguez	2014–2017
Jared M. Maples	2017–2018
Chair/Chief Administrator of the Motor Vehicle Commission	Raymond Martinez	2010–2018
President of the Board of Public Utilities	Lee Solomon	2010–2011
Robert Hanna	2011–2014
Dianne Solomon	2014–2014
Richard Mroz	2014–2018
State Comptroller	Matthew Boxer	2010–2013
Marc Larkins	2013–2015
Philip Degnan	2015–
Superintendent of the State Police	Col. Joseph R. Fuentes	2010–2017
Col. Patrick J. Callahan	2017–
Chief Technology Officer	Dave Weinstein	2016–2018
- * Acting officeholder only.

== Finances and budget ==
=== 2010 New Jersey budget ===
Governor Christie declared a "state of emergency" and laid out plans for more than US$1 billion in cuts to the state budget in an address to the New Jersey State Assembly on February 10, 2010. The budget included a carefully crafted plan requiring school districts to spend their surpluses in order to allow the state to withhold US$400 million in aid funding while retaining federal stimulus eligibility and avoiding the need for the legislature to pass a bill. Due to falling revenues and growing expenses, the Christie administration inherited a US$1.3 billion budget deficit from the US$29 billion 2009 New Jersey budget passed by Jon Corzine's administration.

On February 9, 2010, he signed Executive Order No. 12, which placed a 90-day freeze on the Council on Affordable Housing (COAH) and established the Housing Opportunity Task Force to examine the State's affordable housing laws, constitutional obligations, and the effectiveness of the current framework.

On February 11, 2010, Christie signed Executive Order No. 14, which declared a "state of fiscal emergency exists in the State of New Jersey" due to the projected $2.2 billion budget deficit for the current fiscal year (FY 2010). In a speech before a special joint session of the New Jersey Legislature on the same day, Christie addressed the budget deficit and revealed a list of fiscal solutions to close the gap. Christie also suspended funding for the Department of the Public Advocate and called for its elimination. Some Democrats criticized Christie for not first consulting them on his budget cuts and for circumventing the Legislature's role in the budget process.

=== 2011 New Jersey budget ===
The battles over New Jersey's state budget for the 2012 fiscal year starting July 1, 2011, began in February 2011. Governor Christie vetoed 14 bills on February 21, 2011, which were intended to promote economic growth and job creation and were passed by the New Jersey State Assembly earlier in the month. Christie justified his vetoes by stating that the bills failed to pay for themselves, while Assembly Democrats replied that the bills would not have cost money immediately, and that their funding could have been addressed at a later date. Christie followed up by announcing that his own budget would be put forth the next day, including some similar business tax incentives which would be structured within the context of a balanced budget.

In late June 2011, Christie utilized New Jersey's line item veto to eliminate nearly US$1 billion from the proposed budget, signing it into law just hours prior to the July 1, 2011, beginning of the state's fiscal year.

==== February budget address ====
Governor Christie scheduled a budget address to the State Legislature and his constituents on February 22, 2011. Throughout the months prior to the address, Christie had been making his case for cutting business taxes, giving property tax relief to residents, overhauling funding of the State pension system, changing school aid, and possibly cutting State Medicaid benefits. News analysis of the events predicted that this would be the beginning of a partisan political battle between the Governor's office and the Democrat led State Assembly, which was born out prior to the address by Senate President Stephen Sweeney who was quoted as saying "We've heard nothing from the administration. This is not a good start".

Democratic Chairman John Wisniewski announced, as part of the budget address coverage, US$250 million in funding towards education programs as part of Christie's promise to revamp public school spending in the state. New Jersey had spent around US$10 billion a year on education in previous administrations, but the Christie administration had cut funding in the 2010 budget which prompted lawsuits being heard by the New Jersey Supreme Court. Senate republicans were reported to be advocating for increased funding to suburban districts in the state.

==== State pension funding ====
Governor Christie was expected to budget US$500 million to the New Jersey pension fund in the 2011 budget. The Christie administration did not budget any of the US$3 billion in funding to the pension plan in the 2010 state budget, and budgeted an amount of $500 million in 2011.

=== 2013 New Jersey budget ===
In June 2013, Christie signed a $33 billion state budget that made a record $1.7 billion payment to the state's pension fund and also increased school funding by almost $100 million. He agreed to expand the state's Medicaid program, with more costs covered by the federal government under the Affordable Care Act.

=== Credit rating downgrades ===
Under Christie New Jersey's credit rating has been downgraded the most of any New Jersey governor. As of September 2014, only Illinois had a lower rating among US states.

On May 2, 2014, Fitch Ratings, one of the major Wall Street credit-rating agencies, downgraded New Jersey's credit-rating for both the "scale and belatedness" of New Jersey $807 million budget gap, following a similar downgrade by Standard & Poor's in April. On May 13, 2014, Moody's Investors Service downgraded New Jersey credit. As of May 2014, the state's credit rating had been dropped twice by Fitch Ratings, twice by Standard & Poors and twice by Moody's Investors Service. The credit rating agencies performed the downgrades based on the overestimation of revenue collection by the Christie administration, and on relying on short-term measures rather than implementing taxation or spending changes that would have an impact in limiting budgets.

On September 5, 2014, Fitch Ratings again lowered their rating on the state's debt, from A+ to A. stating: "Following significant revenue underperformance, the state relied upon the repudiation of its statutory contribution requirements to the pension systems to return to budgetary balance, exacerbating a key credit weakness" Some days later, citing unbalanced budget and under-funded pensions, Standard and Poor's also cut the state's rating.

In November 2016, the state saw its 10th credit downgrade under Christie, with a Standard and Poors rating moving from A to A− (stable to negative).

In 2017, Moody's downgraded New Jersey's credit rating for the fourth time during Christie's governorship.

=== Affordable Care Act marketing money ===
New Jersey lost a $7.6 million grant from the federal government to promote the health insurance exchange under the Affordable Care Act (Obamacare) in February 2014. The federal government rejected a proposal from New Jersey's insurance commissioner to use the funds to support Medicaid enrollment, rather than insurance enrollment through the new, subsidized federal marketplace "exchange".

Despite this, as of March 2014, the number of people without health insurance in New Jersey had fallen to its lowest level since 1990. A report by the Robert Wood Johnson Foundation and the Rutgers Center for State Health Policy (studying Medicaid, private direct, and exchange enrollments, as part of the Urban Institute's national monitoring project) estimated that 430,000 people in New Jersey gained coverage from October 2013 through early March 2014 (before the last-minute sign-ups). "There was a lot less investment in outreach and public education in New Jersey than in other places, like New York," according to Rutgers Center director Joel Cantor (an author of the report). "They probably had $10 invested for every $1 in New Jersey," but achieved only comparable results. Activists planned to focus on Latinos and young adults for the next open enrollment.

== Handling of natural disasters ==
=== December 2010 North American blizzard ===
Governor Christie was not in New Jersey during the December 2010 North American blizzard. Acting Governor and Senate President Stephen M. Sweeney, took charge during this historic blizzard while the Governor and Lt. Governor were on vacation.

=== Hurricane Irene ===
Governor Christie played a very vocal role in responding to the August 2011 landfall in New Jersey of Hurricane Irene. Prior to the storm's arrival he ordered massive evacuations of coastal areas of the state. At one press conference he directly told people who had not heeded evacuation orders to "get the hell off the beach".

=== Superstorm Sandy ===
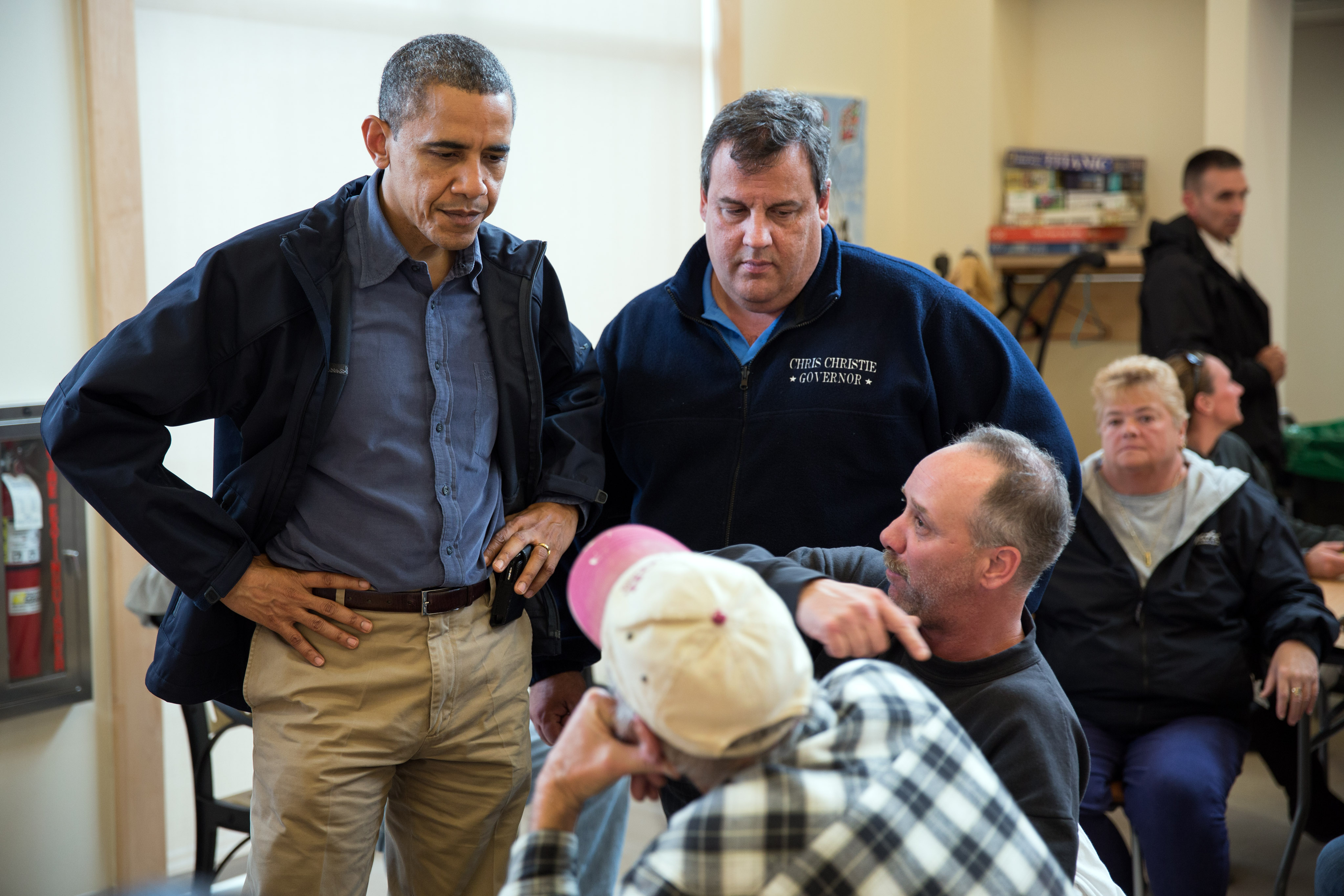
President Barack Obama and Governor Chris Christie talk with local residents in Brigantine, New Jersey.

"Chris Christie On Post-Sandy Obama Meet- 'I Would Do It Again'" video from MSNBC in 2017 in the aftermath of Hurricane Harvey

Christie played a part in New Jersey preparing for Superstorm Sandy in October 2012. Christie ordered all residents of barrier islands from Sandy Hook to Cape May to evacuate and closed Atlantic City casinos. Tolls were suspended on the northbound Garden State Parkway and the westbound Atlantic City Expressway starting at 6 a.m. on October 28. President Obama signed an emergency declaration for New Jersey, allowing the state to request federal funding and other assistance for actions taken before Sandy's landfall.

On October 30, 2012, during a press conference to discuss the impact of Hurricane Sandy, Christie praised the disaster relief efforts of President Barack Obama.

In February 2016, the state received only $15 million of $1 billion funds available for relief and resiliency funding because of a weak application submitted by the Christie administration.

=== Blizzard of 2016 ===
Christie was highly criticized for first not planning to return to New Jersey and then staying only briefly for the January 2016 United States blizzard. When asked why he was campaigning in New Hampshire when part of the Jersey Shore was flooded in sea water Christie said: "What do you want me to do? Go down there with a mop?"

== Supreme Court nominations and stand-off with Senate ==
A substantial portion of Christie's tenure was taken up with a major conflict with the New Jersey Legislature over the New Jersey Supreme Court's partisan balance. The stand-off between the governor and the New Jersey Senate resulted in longstanding vacancies, with temporarily assigned appellate judges filling in.

Justices of the Supreme Court of New Jersey are nominated by the Governor and confirmed by the Senate. By tradition since the 1947 state constitution, the seven member court maintains a political balance and is composed of four members of either the Democratic Party or Republican Party and three of the other. Justices initially serve for seven years after which they have customarily received tenure and are able to serve until the mandatory retirement age of seventy.

In what The New York Times called "a case of political overreach," Christie broke with this tradition in May 2010 when he chose not to renominate Justice John E. Wallace, Jr. and instead nominated attorney Anne M. Patterson. Christie said that he thought the court "had inappropriately encroached on both the executive and legislative function, and that if elected governor, I would take steps through the decisions I made regarding the court to bring back an appropriate constitutional balance to the court." New Jersey Senate Majority Leader Stephen Sweeney refused to consider any nominee to Wallace's seat.

Eventually Christie and Sweeney reached a deal in May 2011. When Justice Roberto Rivera-Soto announced he would step down when his term expired in September 2011 Christie nominated Patterson to replace him. The Senate unanimously confirmed Patterson on June 28, 2011, and she was sworn in on September 1, 2011.

On January 23, 2012, Christie filed the nomination of Bruce Harris and Philip Kwon. In March, Kwon's nomination was rejected by the Senate Judiciary Committee, the first gubernatorial nominee for the Supreme Court in modern times to fail to be approved. In May, the Judiciary Committee rejected Harris' nomination, purportedly because he lacked courtroom experience.

In December 2012, Christie nominated David F. Bauman. and Robert Hanna. Hanna received no confirmation hearing and in January 2014, Christie withdrew the nomination. Baumen received no confirmation hearing.

In August 2013, Christie declined to nominate Helen E. Hoens for lifetime tenure saying "I simply could not be party to the destruction of Helen Hoens's professional reputation. I was not going to let her loose to the animals." Christie instead nominated Faustino J. Fernandez-Vina on September 30, 2013, and following confirmation by the New Jersey Senate was sworn on November 19, 2013.

In May 2014, Christie and Senate President Stephen Sweeney struck a deal whereby Christie would re-nominate Chief Justice Stuart Rabner in exchange for Sweeney's support of the nomination of Superior Court Judge Lee Solomon. This was a victory for judicial independence, according to the New Jersey Bar Association. Both men were confirmed by the Senate on June 19, 2014.

Christie again nominated Bauman in February 2016. Of the nomination, Sweeney said "I will not stand for Chris Christie's repeated attempts to pack the court" and Christie's attempts "to end the 70-year tradition of partisan balance and judicial independence."

Christie nominated Walter F. Timpone, who identifies as a Democrat, in April 2016.

== Council on Affordable Housing ==
The Council on Affordable Housing (COAH) is a state agency within the New Jersey Department of Community Affairs responsible for ensuring that all 566 municipalities in the state provide their fair share of low and moderate income housing, created by the New Jersey Legislature in response to the Fair Housing Act of 1985 and a series of New Jersey Supreme Court rulings known as the Mount Laurel decisions. On February 9, 2010, Christie suspended COAH and appointed a committee in preparation to dismantle it. In January 2014, the Supreme Court ruled that it was not within his power "to abolish independent agencies that were created by legislative action." It also ordered the COAH to come up with new regulations regarding the development of affordable housing. COAH passed new guidelines on May 1, 2014, which increased the number of units developers are permitted to build in exchange for one affordable housing unit from four to nine. When asked the agency refused to provide the contract for the Rutgers University professor who prepared the plan and claimed that the documents used to calculate the new guidelines had been lost, leading an affordable housing group to offer a $1,000 reward. In July 2014, a superior court judge ruled that the contract must be released and a search conducted for the missing documents.

In October 2014 the COAH Board failed to meet the deadline by the Supreme Court for establishing new Third Round guidelines, when the Board voted 3-3, to adopt the proposal. In the absence of action by the state, the New Jersey Supreme Court ruled in March 2015, that determination of affordable housing obligations would be administered by the court.

== Christie absence from New Jersey ==
In his second term, Christie spent all or part of 520 days out of the state, much of it related to his chairmanship of the Republican Governors Association and his failed bid to become the GOP nominee in the 2016 presidential election.

== Controversies and investigations ==
=== The Port Authority of New York and New Jersey ===
==== Access to the Region's Core ====
On October 7, 2010, Christie accepted the unanimous recommendation of the ARC Project Executive Committee to terminate the Access to the Region's Core rail project due to concerns about cost overruns. Then executive director of the Port Authority Christopher O. Ward opposed the cancellation of this project. The Christie administrations' stated reasons for his actions came under scrutiny in 2012 when a non-partisan agency determined his stated reasons to be specious. Others alleged that Christie planned to re-purpose billions of dollars in building funds to use for New Jersey building projects that provided political benefits to his administration, and came at the expense of New Jersey's transit and economic interests. Support from New Jersey voters for his decision to kill the project grew in hindsight, from 51% in October 2010 to 56% two months later. In a controversial move in 2011, Christie directed the PANYNJ to divert money originally earmarked for ARC to highway projects. The agency agreed to pay $1.8 billion to partially fund efforts to rehabilitate the Pulaski Skyway and Route 139, replace Wittpenn Bridge, and extend Route 1&9T, all part of the larger distribution network in the Port of New York and New Jersey. A 2014 article in WNYC claimed: "According to documents and interviews with more than a dozen top-level sources, the governor made clear from the get-go that the agency would be the source of cash for New Jersey's hard-up infrastructure budget. And he and his team proceeded to wrangle billions from the bi-state authority to further his political goals—much of that for projects that had never been under the Port Authority's jurisdiction before."

In February 2014, the special joint committee of the New Jersey Legislature investigating the Fort Lee lane closures subpoenaed the PANYNJ for documents related to the ARC project, specifically with regard to projected cost overruns and to discussions related to Christie's appointments to the agency.

In March 2014, Christie called for the dismantling of the Port Authority which would give his administration direct access to New Jersey's share of the tolls which the agency now collects and are dedicated to regional transit projects and require approval of both states. NJ Spotlight has suggested that the funds could then be used to renew the state's Transportation Trust Fund without adding debt or increasing taxes.

==== Manhattan District Attorney and SEC investigation ====
In March 2014, Manhattan District Attorney Cyrus Vance, Jr. subpoenaed records from the Port Authority of New York and New Jersey seeking correspondence among authority officials and Governor Christie's administration regarding projects such as the rebuilding of the World Trade Center site and the PATH transportation hub in lower Manhattan. Vance's office has conducted interviews about the agency's funding of reconstruction of the Pulaski Skyway. Christie had directed the Port Authority to spend $1.8 billion on improvements including the Skyway and other roads in New Jersey. As the Port Authority's jurisdiction includes access roads to the Lincoln Tunnel but not the Holland Tunnel, the Christie administration allegedly pressured the Port Authority to classify the Skyway as an access route to the Lincoln Tunnel. Subpoenas also requested communications and other documents related to the Port Authority takeover of operations at the Atlantic City International Airport

In April 2014, media reported that lawyers from the New York office of the Securities and Exchange Commission were working with the New York County DA's office in a joint probe into the possible misuse of Port Authority funds. State Senator Ray Lesniak reportedly had sent a letter to the SEC and the Internal Revenue Service calling for an investigation into whether the diversion of money to New Jersey roads may have violated securities or tax laws. Governor Christie expressed his confidence that the SEC would find no wrongdoing in the financing of New jersey transportation projects. In June 2014, the Port Authority acknowledged the existence of the SEC and Manhattan District Attorney's Office investigations in a bond investor disclosure document.

On June 23, 2014, The New York Times reported that the Manhattan District Attorney and SEC inquiries are focusing on possible securities law violations and civil or criminal violations of the New York's Martin Act. The Times reported that use of the funds for the Skyway was opposed by Port Authority lawyers, and that investigators are focusing on possible mischaracterization of the Skyway project in Port Authority bond documents. Jeffrey Chiesa, a close friend of Christie's and former New Jersey attorney general, was among the people who had been subpoenaed by the Manhattan District Attorney, but that he is not a target of the investigation. He was Christie's chief of staff when the bond documents were changed to include questionable language referring to the Skyway.

In December 2014 United Airlines filed a complaint with the Federal Aviation Administration that claims that since 2004 the PANYNJ has diverted more than $2 billion from the metro area airports to non-airport uses and that in 2014 alone it spent $181 million to repair the Pulaski Skyway and $60 million on the Wittpenn Bridge, NJDOT owned and operated structures.

==== Fort Lee lane closure scandal ====
On September 9, 2013, two of three dedicated toll lanes of the Fort Lee entrance to the upper level of the George Washington Bridge (GWB), operated by the Port Authority of New York and New Jersey, were closed without notification of municipal government and police officials. The lane closings caused traffic jams leading to major delays for school transportation and police and emergency response within Fort Lee, both during and after the peak hours of travel.

An investigation of the traffic jams by the state Assembly and release of documents subpoenaed from Christie appointee David Wildstein on January 9, 2014, showed Christie officials ordered the closures: On August 13, 2013 Christie Deputy Chief of Staff Bridget Ann Kelley emailed Wildstein "time for traffic problems in Fort Lee." Wildstein responded "got it." Following these revelations, on January 9, 2014, Christie gave a nearly two-hour press conference denying any knowledge of any of his appointees' actions and announcing he fired Ms. Kelly, calling her stupid and a liar. Subpoenaed documents from the Port Authority suggested that Christie administration officials not only conspired to create traffic jams on the George Washington Bridge but undertook elaborate efforts to hide apparently political motives. The scandal came to be known as Bridgegate.

On January 31, 2014, a letter from counsel for Wildstein alleged that "evidence exists" "tying Mr. Christie to having knowledge" of the lane closures while they were happening in September 2013 and suggested that Wildstein had documents to prove his claims. In its response, the Christie administration stated that Christie "only first learned lanes were closed when it was reported by the press and as he said in his January 9th press conference, had no indication that this was anything other than a traffic study until he read otherwise the morning of January 8th".

Widely held speculation is that the target of the toll lane closures by Governor Christie's staff and his political appointees at the Port Authority was Fort Lee Mayor Mark Sokolich, a Democrat, for not supporting Christie, a Republican, in his 2013 gubernatorial re-election campaign. Investigators are also examining other possible motives, such as whether the closures were intended to affect a major real estate development project, which was a top priority for Sokolich, that was underway at the Fort Lee bridge access point.

Investigations were initiated by the New Jersey Assembly Transportation Committee, the New Jersey Legislative Select Committee, the Port Authority, United States Attorney for the District of New Jersey, the United States Senate Committee on Commerce, Science and Transportation, special legislative investigative committees, and the Governor's office itself. On September 18, 2014, WNBC reported that unnamed federal sources said the US Attorney investigation had found no evidence that Christie had prior knowledge of or directed the closures. An interim report by NJ legislative committee the investigating the closures was released in December 2014. The committee had been unable to determine if Christie had advance knowledge since it was asked by the US Attorney to postpone interviewing certain key witnesses. On December 5, 2014, WNBC reported that sources close to the federal investigation said that indictments of up to six people could be expected in January 2015 for an "apparent conspiracy to cover up what they refer to as a politically motivated plot".

=== Hurricane Sandy ===
==== NJ Transit equipment damage investigation ====
Hurricane Sandy, which made landfall on October 29, 2012, caused a 13-foot tidal surge that inundated many coastal areas including the Jersey Shore, the Hudson Waterfront, and the Meadowlands. New Jersey Transit Rail Operations (NJT) suffered $120 million in damage for 261 train cars and 62 locomotives left at rail yards at Hoboken Terminal and the Meadows Maintenance Complex in the Kearny Meadows. The executive director of NJT, James Weinstein, defended the decision to leave trains in rail yards that ended up under water saying those locations had no history of flooding, and that no one could have predicted the extent of the storm surges. "We stored it where it should be. Unfortunately, it's the worst storm we've ever had in New Jersey." In December, Weinstein conceded that information to the contrary had been available to the agency, but that he had not studied a report which indicated the potential danger. Weinstein said: "That study concluded that we had as much as 20 years to adapt to the [climate] changes that are taking place." He also said that NJT used weather reports showing there was a 10 to 20 percent chance of flooding in the yards. The newspaper The Record conducted an investigation in collaboration with WNYC/New Jersey Public Radio which concluded that the agency had misread meteorological information available to them. Approximately a year after the storm, Christie spoke with editorial board of the newspaper and said that responsibility lay with a low-level civil service employee whom he could not fire. According to The Record, who reviewed emails obtained through a public records request, at least fifteen agency executives and managers were aware of fleet movements into low-lying areas in the days before the storm. A report released in December 2013 by Texas A&M Engineering Extension Service said that NJT ignored flood warnings and did not follow its own damage mitigation plans. In January 2014, the New Jersey Senate decided to conduct an investigation with State Senator Robert M. Gordon saying that the governor's explanation has been "unsatisfactory."

==== Stronger than the Storm ====
On August 8, 2013, Frank Pallone the Democratic U.S. Representative for New Jersey's 6th congressional district and a vocal Christie critic wrote a letter to the Department of Housing and Urban Development (HUD) requesting an inquiry into the potential misuse of disaster aid for political gain with regard to the Stronger than the Storm media campaign. Christie and his family appeared in television commercials produced for the campaign, paid for by HUD, which were broadcast in the run-up to the 2013 gubernatorial election. Pallone called for investigation to dispel any appearance of impropriety, also drawing attention $2.2 million difference for fees between the accepted bid and the next most expensive which included no plans to include the governor in the ads. On January 14, 2014, HUD announced that it would review the expenditure. A press release stated that it is "an audit and not an investigation of the procurement process." The audit is based on irregularities with billing and adherence to the contract pricing as determined by the federal government. MWW, which produced the campaign, stated that it welcome the review and that it had not presented the idea of Christie appearing in ads until after contract was awarded and that it was confident that it had followed correct billing procedures. The Asbury Park Press reported that a MWW executive had earlier said the Christie's appearance was part of the initial pitch and that information received from an open records law request was greatly redacted.

The federal audit released on September 3, 2014, did not find fault with the appearance of the governor and his family in the ad, but instead found fault with the mechanics of awarding the contract, specifically that key procurement requirements had not been met.

==== Hoboken relief funds investigation ====
On January 18, 2014, Democratic Mayor of Hoboken Dawn Zimmer, appearing on MSNBC, claimed that Lieutenant Governor of New Jersey Kim Guadagno and Richard Constable, director of the New Jersey Department of Community Affairs had earlier insinuated to her that more Hurricane Sandy relief funds would be released to the city if it approved a project in its northwest quadrant proposed by the Rockefeller Group, which wants to build a 40-story office tower there and had entered into an undisclosed agreement with New Jersey to build a light rail station. On February 22, the Federal Bureau of Investigation interviewed members of the city's government and potential witnesses, who were instructed to preserve any evidence they might possess. They were also asked by the office of United States Attorney for the District of New Jersey, Paul Fishman, to not discuss the matter publicly. On January 31, the city acknowledged that it had received subpoenas from that office.

As of February 12, 2014, the mayor's office had refused to comply with requests from a Republican opposition research super PAC under the New Jersey Open Public Records Act (OPRA) for records of her communications with groups such as the Democratic National Committee and MSNBC from January 7 through January 31. In denying the request, the mayor's office cited the Republican operative's query as being "overly broad, vague, unclear, and a request for research." The Bergen County newspaper The Record, reported that Christie's legal team also requested documents and a private interview with the Hoboken mayor, which were also rejected. An investigation commissioned by Christie found no evidence to substantiate Zimmer's claims and stated: "They are contradicted by contemporaneous documents, other witnesses' accounts, and her own prior statements." Zimmer dismissed the report as biased, and as a "one-sided whitewash".

==== Housing funds distribution disparity and contract terminations ====
Disparities about distribution of housing construction funds for affordable housing came under scrutiny when it was revealed that areas least impacted by hurricane were receiving funds in greater proportion than heavily hit areas. A high-profile example was high-rise project Somerset Mews in New Brunswick received $4.8 million in Hurricane Sandy relief funds despite the fact the city was not badly hit by the storm.

In Belleville, Sandy had caused some flooding, downed trees, and power disruptions, but Mayor Raymond Kimble said he was not aware of any reports of displaced residents. $6 million in state funds towards the new construction of the $18 million Frankin Manor low-income senior citizen housing complex was announced shortly before the Democratic mayor endorsed Christie's re-election. Christie personally promoted the funding for the project. State funding coming from community development block grants was later increased to $10.2 million. Statements by Christie and other officials, at the project's groundbreaking on May 29, 2013, stressed keeping Belleville seniors in town. Sandy was mentioned only by an Essex County official, and not in relationship to the senior housing.

January 2014 news coverage traced the state block grants back to federal Sandy funds, and questioned the appropriateness of spending Sandy funds on this project, and the timing of the endorsement. Kimble said that the endorsement "had nothing to do with [Christie] releasing those funds." The Star-Ledger editorialized that Christie had used the Sandy funds as a "political slush fund" in "relatively unscathed" Belleville, in a case sounding like "Hoboken in reverse", and called for subpoenas.

On January 27, Anthony Marchetta, executive director of the Housing and Mortgage Finance Agency (established under the Department of Community Affairs), ruled out special priority for Sandy victims, saying, "there are prohibitions against creating a special class." However, on February 24, DCA Commissioner Richard Constable announced that the first three months of the application process would be reserved for Sandy-affected seniors. A DCA spokeswoman said that priority will be given to individuals who registered for FEMA assistance or who rented or owned a home made uninhabitable by Sandy. Sandy victims will get priority in all projects given the federal funds.

Two contractors hired for New Jersey Department of Community Affairs's Reconstruction, Rehabilitation, Elevation and Mitigation (RREM) program were prematurely terminated, amid criticism and unclear circumstances. One, a contract with Hammerman & Gainer Inc. (HGI) for $68 million, originally mean to run until 2016, was ended in a buyout deal December 2013. The contract was valid for 8 months and the company was paid $36 million. Another, with URS Corporation for $20 million was terminated in April 2014, 15 months before its completion date.

=== Race to the Top ===
On August 25, 2010, it was announced that New Jersey had lost out on $400 million in federal Race to the Top education grants due to a clerical error in the application by an unidentified mid-level state official. When prompted by the application to compare their 2008 and 2009 school budgets to illustrate their commitment to education financing, the official compared the state's 2010 and 2011 financing, thus forfeiting the section's five points. Ohio, the lowest-scoring state to be awarded funding, scored three points higher than New Jersey.

In response to the decision, Christie criticized the Obama administration by saying,

This is the stuff, candidly, that drives people crazy about government and crazy about Washington ... the first part of it is the mistake of putting the wrong piece of paper in, it drives people crazy and, believe me, I'm not thrilled about it. But the second part is, does anybody in Washington, D.C. have a lick of common sense? Pick up the phone and ask us for the number ... that's the stuff the Obama administration should answer for. Are you guys just down there checking boxes like mindless drones, or are you thinking? When the president comes back to New Jersey, he's going to have to explain to the people of the state of New Jersey why he's depriving them of $400 million that this application earned.

On August 26, the U.S. Department of Education released a video showing that the budget issue had been specifically raised at a meeting with Christie's Education Commissioner Bret Schundler, contradicting Christie's claim that the federal government had not informed them of the error. In response, Gov. Christie asked for Schundler's resignation, saying that Schundler had misinformed Christie of the facts of the situation. Schundler initially agreed to resign, but the following morning asked to be fired instead, citing his need to claim unemployment benefits. Schundler maintains that he told Christie the truth, and that Christie is misstating what actually occurred.

New Jersey's largest teachers union, the New Jersey Education Association, claimed that Christie's rejection of a compromise worked out by Schundler with the teachers' union on May 27 was to blame. Christie decided the compromise would severely weaken the state's ability to carry out reform measures opposed by the union, such as merit pay for teachers, the use of student test data in teacher evaluations, and tougher teacher tenure requirements. The rejection of the agreement with the union meant that the state had little more than three days to complete the grant applications, which were due on June 1. By Christie's own accounting, the state lost 14 points due to the lack of widespread union support for the reforms.

=== Failure to disclose income ===
On August 18, 2009, Governor Christie acknowledged that he had loaned $46,000 to Michele Brown in 2007, while serving as her superior as the state's U.S. attorney, and that he had failed to report either the loan or its monthly $500 interest payments on both his income tax returns and his mandatory financial disclosure report to the New Jersey Election Law Enforcement Commission. In response to the disclosure of the financial relationship between Christie and Brown, State Senator Loretta Weinberg, the Democratic candidate for lieutenant governor, called on Brown to recuse herself from the task of retrieving U.S. Attorney's Office records requested by the Corzine campaign under the Freedom of Information Act. On August 25, 2009, Brown resigned from her post, stating that she does not want to be "a distraction" for the office, but later became the Appointments Counsel for Governor and was appointed CEO of the New Jersey Economic Development Authority (EDA) in October 2012.

=== Alleged retaliation against Jersey City mayor ===
On January 8, 2014, the mayor of Jersey City in Hudson County, Steven Fulop, came forward and alleged that he was also targeted for political reprisals by the Christie administration for declining to endorse Christie in the 2013 election for governor. Fulop's claim may be supported by an e-mail by David Wildstein dated September 9, 2013. Deputy Chief of Staff Kelly had e-mailed David Wildstein and asked about his response, if any, to Fort Lee Mayor Sokolich about the Fort Lee toll lane closures. Wildstein responded: "Radio silence. His name comes right after Mayor Fulop."

Jersey City is the second-largest city in New Jersey. On July 1, 2013, Christie had spoken at Fulop's inauguration. Subsequently, Bill Stepien and Bridget Kelly set up a "Mayor's Day" for Fulop, where "quite a contingent" of the Governor's cabinet would meet with the mayor and his staff. At least seven different meetings were scheduled, most on July 23 with some set for July 29.

On July 18, Fulop, a Democrat, communicated his decision not to endorse Republican Christie in the upcoming election. That same day, the Mayor's staff received multiple phone calls from New Jersey officials, within the span of an hour, canceling the meetings with: Jim Leonard (Chief of Staff at the Office of the Treasurer), Joseph Mrozek (Transportation Commissioner), Rich Constable (Commissioner of Community Affairs), and Marc Ferzan (executive director of the Governor's Office of Recovery and Rebuilding, leading Hurricane Sandy recovery efforts). Bill Baroni (Port Authority) called and cancelled the following morning. The last meeting, with Michele Brown (Economic Development), was cancelled the next Monday.

Fulop claimed Christie officials had sought his endorsement. According to Fulop, as an incentive for endorsement, he was "offered increased access to state commissioners"; after he declined to endorse, Fulop reported that "meetings with those officials were canceled within an hour." According to Fulop, the retaliation continued for months: "nearly every single meeting we have requested with state commissioners with regard to proactive Jersey City issues has been unfortunately rejected over the last six months, along with countless requests we made to the Port Authority".

Fulop interpreted the behavior as retaliation for his refusal to endorse. He conveyed this concern in an August 18 e-mail to Bill Baroni, writing: "I am not sure if it is a coincidence that your office cancelled a meeting several weeks back that seemed to be simultaneous to other political conversations elsewhere that were happening. Prior to that you were always very responsive and I sincerely hope the two issues are not related".

The Wall Street Journal reported that the US District Attorney for NJ subpoenaed records regarding the meetings cancellations. In March the paper reported that the PANYNJ had also been subpoenaed.

=== Pay-to-play allegation involving Charlie Baker ===
On May 17, 2011, Charlie Baker, who had then just recently lost a gubernatorial race in Massachusetts, made a $10,000 contribution to the New Jersey Republican State Committee, identifying himself as a "partner" in General Catalyst Partners. On December 8, 2011, the New Jersey Treasury Department's Division of Investment outlined a proposal to invest up to $25 million of its pension funds through General Catalyst, which channeled New Jersey funds into Oscar Insurance, where Baker sits on the board of directors. New Jersey actually invested $9.6 million through General Catalyst. Assuming the 2.5% management fee as outlined in the proposal, this level of investment generated $240,000 per year for General Catalyst. Baker co-hosted a high-dollar fundraiser for Christie in March 2013.

The timing from the May 2011 contribution to the December 2011 investment offer, and the timing from that ongoing investment to the March 2013 fundraising, allegedly violated New Jersey's strict pay-to-play laws and Treasury regulations. Baker, General Catalyst, and the Treasury Department were each faulted. As the report was publicly breaking in May 2014, Baker denied being an executive, employee, or investment adviser for General Catalyst, and denied knowledge that the Oscar Insurance investment came from New Jersey pension funds.

The Treasury Department began an investigation. During September 2014, the state sold the investment quietly, for a 46% profit. It was not immediately clear whether or how this sale might affect the release of the Treasury Department's investigation report, but Baker considered the matter resolved. The Christie administration has not made the results of the investigation public and refused an Open Public Records Act request to do so made by the International Business Times.

=== Alleged conflict of interest by SIC chairman Robert Grady ===
Robert E. Grady is a venture capitalist, a private equity investor, and a senior-level public official. He was former chairman of New Jersey's State Investment Council, which oversees the state's pension fund. He and Christie both hail from Livingston and have known each other since high school.

The New Jersey AFL–CIO filed a complaint with the State Ethics Commission, claiming that Grady "has violated the Division's own rules barring politics in the selection and retention of such funds and investments, and has further created an appearance of impropriety." The complaint was dismissed by the New Jersey Ethics Commission on March 17, 2015, which Grady found "not surprising", since the investigation was, in his words, "bogus, frivolous and partisan from the beginning."

After volunteering for nearly five years, during which the pension fund posted over $35 billion in investment gains and income, Grady stepped down from the position on November 19, 2014, citing a desire to spend more time with his family and care for his young son who reportedly had a serious health issue.

=== ExxonMobil lawsuit ===
Christie's office settled a lawsuit with ExxonMobil by allowing the corporation to pay $225 million in damages for environmental contamination at two sites, less than 3% of the $8.9 billion that the state's lawyers had sought, and extended the compensation to cover other damages not named in the original lawsuit.

Environmentalists were apoplectic, slamming the settlement as wholly inadequate. David Pringle, campaign director for the state chapter of Clean Water Action, called it "the biggest corporate subsidy in state history". Jeff Tittel of the Sierra Club called this move "a violation of the public trust." The New Jersey State Senate also condemned the deal. Now-former commissioner of the New Jersey Department of Environmental Protection Bradley Campbell, who had initially authorized the lawsuit on the state's behalf, accused Christie of deliberately cutting a deal favorable to Exxon at the state's expense, pointing out, "While he was chairman of the Republican Governors Association in 2014, the group received $500,000 from Exxon and more from company employees," and that this happened during the trial. Campbell also accused Christie's office of inserting itself into the negotiations at the eleventh hour, but they were in fact negotiating with Exxon much earlier.

The previous gubernatorial administration, that of Democrat Jon Corzine, had also attempted to settle with Exon, for $550 million, though this offer was made before a 2009 ruling that strengthened the state's bargaining position.

Much of the payment will be diverted to pay lawyers fees and go in the general fund.

=== Hunterdon County's quashed indictments ===
The quashing of indictments of three Hunterdon County (HC) officials raised questions about abuse of power. Christie has denied any involvement in the case, and there is no evidence that he ordered the charges dropped.

In January 2008, former undercover New York City narcotics sergeant Mark Kobner was Chief Warrant Officer under newly elected HC Sheriff Deborah Trout, who was an acquaintance of Lieutenant Governor Kim Guadagno, herself a former Monmouth County Sheriff. Trout had led an association of county-level law enforcement officers who supported Christie, and Guadagno thanked Trout for sending deputies to work in the campaign. Kobner told a HC prosecutor about practices in the sheriff's office being improper or criminal, saying that Trout had demanded a loyalty oath, and a promise to not vote against her. Some of her deputies, Kobner said, had created illegal law enforcement identifications for politically favored persons.

HC's top prosecutor, J. Patrick Barnes, assigned HC assistant prosecutor Bennett A. Barlyn, a former deputy attorney general, to look into the case.

Investigators found that the legally required background checks for hiring into the sheriff's office were often not done. The grand jury would find that Undersheriff Michael Russo had overseen his own background check. When a web forum had posted articles about deputies' connections to an SPCA chapter that the New Jersey State Commission of Investigation had said was "the paradigm of a society that is out-of-control", Russo had emailed the site administrator, telling him he was "under investigation for criminal/civil prosecution" and demanding immediate removal of the content; Russo would be indicted for this intimidation. During the investigation, Russo was reportedly overheard to say on more than one occasion that Christie would "step in [and] have this whole thing thrown out." Russo later denied saying this.

Trout resisted the investigation, and Barnes repeatedly asked the public corruption unit of the office of state Attorney General (AG) Paula T. Dow to take the case from the county, but he was told that the county should proceed themselves. Dow, a former Essex County Prosecutor, was a Christie appointee as AG, and was previously his counsel when he was New Jersey's US Attorney. (Following her service as AG, Christie would place Dow in a Port Authority post, and then in a Burlington County Superior Court judgeship.) HC assistant prosecutor William McGovern reportedly met with Dow, telling her that the sheriff and deputies had apparently violated multiple state laws, but came away with a seeming mandate to continue to work it from HC.

In March 2010, the grand jury issued indictments totaling 43 counts, initially sealed, against Trout, Russo (who was then campaigning for election as Warren County Sheriff), and sheriff's investigator John Falat, Jr., who were each charged with official misconduct (7, 23, and 6 counts, respectively) and variously with other counts of criminal simulation and falsifying records.

On May 7, 2010, the indictments were unsealed. Later on that same day, Dow took over the HC Prosecutor's Office, ousting Barnes, and put Deputy AG Dermot P. O'Grady in charge. The old prosecutors were removed from the case. (Within a few months, Barlyn would be fired, McGovern would resign after being asked to stay quiet, and Charles M. Ouslander would be forced to retire.)

Over Barlyn's objections, Deputy AG Christine Hoffman filed to dismiss the indictments, saying that the presentation to the grand jury had "legal and factual deficiencies", but the filings did not list any prosecutorial missteps. Indictments are rarely dismissed, and by law should not be dropped unless prosecutorial misconduct is extreme, but the indictments were dismissed in August 2010 even before the defense had filed any objection. One of the grand jurors said, "The prosecutor was meticulous and so were we. Really, the case felt like a no-brainer until the state killed it." Detective Sergeant Kenneth Rowe said in an email, "I have never seen a prosecutorial agency act or work as a defense counsel. Why the interest in this small-time case?"

Barlyn was fired September 15, 2010, for stated reasons by the AG's spokesman which were twice revised over the first few hours. Barlyn filed a wrongful termination lawsuit in Mercer County, claiming that the indictments were quashed to protect the politically connected defendants.

In order to prove that he had presented a solid case, Barlyn asked for access to the grand jury records, detective's notes, the memo with the state's reasons for dismissal, and internal emails about reporters' inquiries. The state had taken the unusual step of moving the records from Flemington to Trenton, and objected to their release. Barlyn's side argued that the three indicted officials had gotten the documents, so he should, too. The court decision on July 22, 2015, granted Barlyn access, but not for public release. The state reportedly had spent $1.7 million in legal fees as of July 2015, in a losing battle to keep them secret. As of June 2016, the state reportedly had paid over $3 million in this case to outside counsel Gibbons P. C. alone, which is a greater sum than what Barlyn had hoped that he and the state would settle on before filing his suit in 2012, and Barlyn said that "a trial appears inevitable."

Barlyn spoke to investigators from the office of US Attorney Paul Fishman on February 4, 2015. A statement from Fishman's office then declared that no investigation was underway, and apparently clearing Christie; this type of statement is extremely unusual, according to former US Attorneys. Christie was Fishman's immediate predecessor, and many staff hired by Christie were still there, including the investigator working with Barlyn. On July 6, 2015, Barlyn sent a letter to US Attorney General Loretta Lynch, saying, "apparent conflicts between Governor Christie's administration and the U. S. Attorney's Office for the District of New Jersey ... may be compromising the latter's independent role relating to the enforcement of federal law."

The Star-Ledger called for subpoenas from a state legislative committee, the US Attorney's Office, or a special prosecutor, and for Dow to testify under oath.

In August or September 2016, an arbitration settlement between Barlyn and the defendants was finalized, with a $1.5 million state payment to Barlyn. The state and the other defendants did not admit guilt. Barlyn called it a "private vindication", but the terms of the settlement prevented him from giving a full public accounting, which led The Star-Ledger to renew its call for a legislative investigation.

=== New Jersey State Police security detail ===
Christie, who sought the nomination to become the 2016 Republican presidential candidate, has said that his campaign will not reimburse the state for the taxpayer funded New Jersey State Police security detail which travels with him on campaign trips.

Between 2010 and 2014, the state police billed the state $1 million. There have also been more than $800,000 in credit card expenses related to political and private trips made by the governor, which the administration has refused to make public. Costs to taxpayers for the first quarter of 2015 were $185,000.

"We're going to continue to conduct this in the same way I've always conducted it," Christie said. New Jerseyeans are overwhelmingly opposed to paying for the Executive Protection Unit for Christie's campaign.

The New Jersey Senate is considering a bill which would require reimbursement of "expenses incurred for travel, food, lodging, security, or any other purposes not directly related to the Governor's regular and official duties as Governor" when traveling out of state to engage in political activities. Christie and his campaign are being sued by three advocacy organizations (New Jersey Citizen Action, New Jersey Families Alliance and BlueWaveNJ) as well as several New Jersey residents who cite his absenteeism from the governorship and misuse of funds.

=== 2017 government shutdown ===
On July 1, 2017, Christie shut down the state government after the Legislature failed to pass a budget. The shutdown furloughed up to 35,000 state workers and led to the closure of state parks, recreational areas, historic sites, and state beaches amid the 4th of July weekend. Christie faced nationwide backlash after photos were released that showed him on the beach at the state-owned Governor's mansion in Island Beach State Park, which was closed to the public due to the shutdown. Prior to the release of the photographs, Christie said "I didn't get any sun today", in response to a reporter's question about his whereabouts. After the release of the photos, Christie's spokesman Brian Murray reiterated that Christie did not get any sun because "he had a baseball hat on." Christie later defended his use of the beach house, saying, "That's the way it goes. Run for governor, and you can have the residence." The incident has been referred to as "Beachgate". A complaint filed on July 6, 2017, with the State Ethics Commission states that according to the "Plain Language Guide to New Jersey's Executive Branch Ethics Standards", no person of the executive branch may obtain a "special benefit" as a result of their position.

=== Post-office open records control ===
In May 2018, it was revealed that Christie, in his final week in office, had preemptively limited open records access to his communications via a letter to the State Archives. (Four other governors have also issued letters regarding their records.) The issue came to light after requests for communications with the company formerly managed by Jared Kushner, son-in-law of the president, which benefited from $33M in tax breaks from the Christie-appointed New Jersey Economic Development Authority, were blocked by Christie's lawyer. During its eight years, Christie's administration spent more than $1 million fighting New Jersey Open Public Records Act (OPRA) requests.

== Clemency and pardons ==
Christie granted clemency or pardons 55 persons during his term, including 26 in his final days in office.

== Public opinion summary ==
According to a poll by Fairleigh Dickinson University's PublicMind conducted in January 2010, Christie entered office with a 48–13% (approval-disapproval) rate. In March 2010, FDU's PublicMind conducted two studies in which New Jersey voters were asked: "Do you approve or disapprove of the way Chris Christie is handling his job as governor?". The early March poll showed Christie's public approval rate at 52–21 but the late March poll showed that his approval had slipped to 43–32% after having announced cuts to the state budget. In May 2010, after months of acrimonious debate over the budget, FDU's PublicMind released another study which showed that New Jersey voters split their opinions: 44% approving of Christie, 42% disapproving. Dr. Peter J. Woolley, director of the PublicMind, noted, "As the breadth and depth of the budget cuts become known, people have hardened in their opinions."

Christie's approval ratings recovered by October 2010. According to the FDU PublicMind poll, a 60% of New Jersey voters agreed that the state should continue to control spending and reduce programs in order to balance the state budget instead of increasing taxes. Consequently, in the October poll, 51% of voters approved the way Christie was handling his job, a seven-point increase over his approval number in May, while 37% disapproved. Woolley commented: "These are strong numbers for a politician who is cutting deeply into the public budget." Through the next couple of months Christie's approval rating remained constant though "favorable" views of him did not match his approvals. For example, in November 2010, FDU PublicMind released a poll in which 49% of the voters approved the job he was doing, while 39% disapproved. This 10 point advantage in his approval rating was much better than his four-point advantage in favorable over unfavorable opinion: 45% said they had a favorable view of the governor and 41% had an unfavorable view.

According to a January 2011 FDU PublicMind poll, Christie began the year with the highest approval ratings of his career, 53% approving, 36% disapproving. In addition, Christie's 47–39% favorable/unfavorable opinion rating at the end of his inaugural year in office was better than that of several previous governors included in the same poll: "Jim Florio's rating was at 25–33% favorable to unfavorable; Christine Whitman broke even with 39–41%; Jim McGreevey had a rating of 23–48%; and Christie's predecessor Jon Corzine got 36–52%, actually an improvement from 30–61% when he left office. Only Richard Codey performed very well, with 37% favorable and 11% unfavorable."

Christie maintained positive approval ratings until early 2011. In a poll conducted by FDU PublicMind in the midst of more budget battles in May 2011, voters split evenly, with 44% approving and 44% disapproving. However, by September 2011, FDU's PublicMind showed that Christie's approvals "bounced back": 54% of New Jersey voters approved his job as governor while only 36% disapproved. A month later, the FDU PublicMind poll release of October 25, 2011, showed that Christie's numbers remained strong, with 51% approving and 36% disapproving.

Governor Christie started 2012 with a majority of NJ residents on his side. According to a January 2012 poll conducted by FDU's PublicMind, with a sample of 800 registered voters, (53%) approved of the way Gov. Christie was handling his job, while 37% disapproved. Woolley commented: "That's the way any office-holder wants to begin the new year." Among voters, men were more likely to approve of the Governor by a margin of (63–30%) while women were more likely to disapprove (42–45%).

In March 2012, Gov. Christie displayed his best numbers since March 2010. The poll conducted by FDU's PublicMind showed that 54% of New Jersey voters approved of the way he was handling his job, while 34% disapproved. In addition, 51% of voters agreed that the state was moving in the right direction. Woolley commented: "His numbers are noteworthy at a time when national Republican candidates have been sharply critical of each other." He went on to note "this is the first time in 10 years of measurements that more than half of New Jersey voters, say things are headed in the right direction."

In May 2012, a FDU's PublicMind poll found that 56% of New Jersey voters approved of the way Gov. Christie was handling his job, and 33% disapproved. For the second survey in a row, voters reported that New Jersey is moving in the right direction. Half of the voters (50%) agreed that the state is moving in the right direction, while (41%) believed that the state has gotten off on the wrong track.

Governor Christie continued to receive high approval ratings among NJ residents in the following months. In August 2012, a FDU's PublicMind poll showed that 55% of New Jersey voters approved of the way Christie is handling his job as governor, 35% disapproved. Numbers showed that men (61%) were more likely to approve of Christie than women (49%). PublicMind's new Executive Director, Krista Jenkins Ph.D., commented on the results; "The fact that the governor's appeal remains sound suggests that the bloom remains on this New Jersey rose, even if women are slightly more likely to see the thorns than see the beauty."

During the 2012 Presidential Campaign, Governor Christie delivered a speech in the Republican National Convention endorsing GOP candidate Mitt Romney for President. Fairleigh Dickinson University's PublicMind conducted a poll following the conclusion of the national conventions. The results of the study showed that New Jersey residents are pleased with the way Christie is handling his job as governor. More than half (51%) of the registered voters who participated in the poll approved of the job Gov. Christie is doing, while (35%) disapproved. Jenkins commented on the results: "These numbers have basically remained the same across polls conducted throughout the year. Policy battles have come and gone, new ones have emerged, and the state continues to struggle with an unemployment rate that's greater than the national average. Yet, Governor Christe remains in good standing with a broad cross-section of registered voters."

In 2013, shortly after having handled Hurricane Sandy, Gov. Christie began the year with strong approval ratings from New Jersey residents. According to a Fairleigh Dickinson University's PublicMind Poll conducted in January, the governor received the "second highest approval rating the poll has measured for Chris Christie." The numbers showed that a sizable majority (73%) of registered voters approved of the way Christie is handling his job as governor, and (19%) disapproved. Jenkins added: "The state is facing significant challenges in the post-Sandy era. Yet voters appear largely pleased with not only where the state is headed, but are even happier with the governor's leadership. It's hard to find such a well-liked political figure in this political rancorous day and age."

In a poll conducted by Fairleigh Dickinson University’s PublicMind Governor Christie's approval ratings were down slightly from where they were in March 2013. Sixty-one percent (61%) of voters indicated their approval of his performance, with 26% who disapprove and 10% stating they are unsure how to judge the governor. Jenkins states, "Should his appeal continue through the campaign season, he stands poised to potentially help his party in the legislature in November."

Following another release Governor Christie's approval numbers remain virtually unchanged from June, despite a high-profile veto of gun legislation. In June, Governor Christie garnered a 61 percent job approval rating. Today, that number is 58%, with 29% who say they disapprove of the governor's job performance. Discussions on the governor's vetoed bipartisan gun control legislation during the poll did not appear to significantly affect his ratings. Jenkins asserts, "Use of his executive power in this capacity does not seem to have hurt his standing in the eyes of a majority of New Jerseyans."

On January 14, 2014, following the Bridgegate revelations, a Monmouth University/Asbury Park Press polling survey put Christie's approval rating at 59%, and while remaining high, it was the first time his ratings were below 60% since before Hurricane Sandy. By January 23, Christie's unfavorable views doubled—up 17 percent—from the previous January. A Rutgers-Eagleton poll, published January 24, showed that the Fort Lee scandal had hurt his standings among New Jersey residents. Christie's favorability rating, as governor, was shown to be 46%, down 22 points from just before his landslide re-election victory in November 2013, with 43% having an unfavorable view. While the majority of residents still approve his overall performance as governor, his 53% job approval was down 15 points from November. A majority, 56%, indicated that it was "very unlikely" or "somewhat unlikely" that Christie's top aides acted without his knowledge in the Fort Lee scandal. Only 20% said they fully believed Christie's explanation about this topic, while 42% did not believe his version at all and 33% only partially believed him.

A Monmouth University/Asbury Park Press poll, published February 24, showed Christie's job approval ratings in New Jersey at 50%, which was down 9% since January and 20% from 12 months prior. Other results showed 61% believed the governor was not completely honest about what he knew about the toll lane closures, and 50% (up from 34% in January) thought Christie was personally involved in the decision to close the toll lanes. A similar poll, released on April 2, showed his approval ratings to be nominally, but not significantly better than the February poll, remaining 14 points lower than December, before the Bridgegate scandal broke. It indicated that 62% said that Bridgegate and Hoboken's Sandy relief aid issues hurt his presidential prospects for 2016, up from 51% in January.

On April 1, 2014, after a Christie-ordered report exonerated him of any wrongdoing in the scandal, a Monmouth University/Asbury Park Press polling survey put his approval rating at 51%, virtually unchanged since February. In that same survey, 32% said that Christie had been completely honest about what he knew about the lane closings, and only 30% saw the report as "fair and unbiased". According to a Quinnipiac University poll released in August, 49% of New Jersey voters approved of Christie's job performance, compared with 47% who disapprove; this was the first time his approval rating went below 50% since August 2011.

In October 2014, for the first time in a Rutgers-Eagleton Poll, a plurality of New Jersey voters, 45%, disapproved of Christie's job performance, compared to 42% who approved of it.

In winter 2015/2016, during his campaign for GOP presidential nominee Christie's approval ratings in New Jersey dropped to their lowest ever during his tenure to the low 30s.

In April 2016 a Rutgers-Eagleton survey found the governor's approval rating had dropped to 26 percent, his lowest approval rating ever. in May 2016 the Quinnipiac University Polling Institute found 64% of voters disapprove of the job Christie is doing, compared to 29% percent who approve.

In June 2016, a Monmouth University poll found that just 27 percent of New Jersey adults approve of Christie's job performance, with 63 percent disapproving. The poll found that 79 percent of New Jersey adults say that Christie was more concerned with his political future than with governing the state.

Poll results released on November 7, 2016, by Rutgers-Eagleton stated that 19% of New Jersey voters viewed Christie favourably, his lowest approval rating ever.

In January 2017, another Quinnipiac poll found a 2% decrease on his approval rating, leading up to 17% with a 78% disapproval rating, making it one of its lowest approval rating for a state governor (both in New Jersey and in the U.S.) in nearly 20 years.

In April 2017, a poll suggested that Christie is the least popular governor in the United States, with a 71% disapproval rating.

In June 2017, a Quinnipiac poll of New Jersey voters found that 15% approved of Christie, and 81% disapproved. This was the lowest recorded approval rating of a New Jersey governor in history, and the lowest approval rating found by Quinnipiac for any governor in any state in more than two decades. Christie said that he did not care about approval ratings because he was not running for office.

== See also ==
- Governorship of Phil Murphy
