= Mary Catherine Cuff =

American judge (born 1947)

Mary Catherine Cuff (born August 28, 1947) is a former acting justice of the New Jersey Supreme Court (Judge of the Appellate Division, Temporarily Assigned to the Supreme Court) who served between 2012 and 2016.

Cuff was born in Newark, New Jersey. She graduated from Rosemont College in 1969 and received her law degree from Rutgers School of Law – Newark in 1973. She was an associate at Waters, McPherson, McNeill in Secaucus from 1986 to 1988.

Cuff was a deputy attorney general and special assistant to the state treasurer from 1974 to 1978. She was an assistant U.S. attorney from 1978 to 1985.

A resident of Brielle, New Jersey, Cuff served on the New Jersey Superior Court sitting in Freehold, the county seat of Monmouth County from 1988 to 1994, including the Appellate Division. Cuff was assigned to the New Jersey Supreme Court by Chief Justice Stuart Rabner in 2012 during a period of conflict between the Christie administration and the New Jersey Senate about the composition of the court and served until 2016 when Walter F. Timpone was confirmed.

== See also ==
- Courts of New Jersey
- List of justices of the Supreme Court of New Jersey
- Ariel A. Rodriguez
- Edwin Stern
- Dorothea O'C. Wefing
