= Edwin Stern =

American judge

Edwin H. Stern (born June 10, 1941) is a lawyer and judge who served as acting justice on the New Jersey Supreme Court (Judge of the Appellate Division, Temporarily Assigned to the Supreme Court).

Stern grew up in South Orange, New Jersey, graduating from Rutgers University in 1963 and from Columbia Law School in 1966. He has lived in West Orange and Monroe Township.

Stern was a law clerk to a judge on the Appellate Division and from 1967 to 1970 worked as a private practice lawyer. He later joined the Hudson County prosecutor's office, where he worked as first assistant (1970–73) and then as acting prosecutor (1973–74). After that, he worked as the director of criminal practice in the Administrative Office of the Courts (AOC) until 1977. He worked as a deputy attorney general in the Department of Law and Public Safety until 1980, when he returned to the AOC, where worked as the assistant director for legal services.

New Jersey Governor Brendan Byrne appointed him to the Superior Court in 1981. Stern became an appellate judge on September 1, 1985, on the New Jersey Superior Court, Appellate Division, and on September 1, 1998, becoming the Presiding Judge of Appellate Division Part H.

On May 3, 2010, Governor Chris Christie declined to re-nominate John E. Wallace, Jr., whose term expired on May 20, 2010. He was the first Justice of the Supreme Court to be denied tenure in more than a half-century since the adoption of the 1947 State Constitution. Chief Justice Stuart Rabner appointed Stern to the Supreme Court in September 2010 during a period of controversy and conflict with the New Jersey Senate about its political composition. He sat on the court until his mandatory retirement in 2011 after which he took a position at Gibbons P.C.

== See also ==
- Courts of New Jersey
- Mary Catherine Cuff
- Ariel A. Rodriguez
- Dorothea O'C. Wefing
- List of justices of the Supreme Court of New Jersey
