= Stronger than the Storm =

2013 New Jersey ad campaign

Stronger than the Storm was an advertising campaign to promote tourism in New Jersey in 2013. It portrayed the state as being resilient and having recovered from the impact and aftermath of Hurricane Sandy, which had caused severe damage in Autumn 2012. The media blitz included billboards, radio spots, and television commercials featuring the Jersey Shore and including appearances by the Governor of New Jersey, Chris Christie, and his wife and children. The United States Department of Housing and Urban Development (HUD) provided funding for the promotional campaign. The awarding of the contract to marketing firm MWW and the propriety of Christie's use of the ads during a re-election campaign has drawn media and governmental scrutiny. In January 2014, HUD initiated an audit of the expenditure. The audit is one of two simultaneous federal inquiries begun in 2014 involving the Chris Christie administration use of federal funds provided by the Hurricane Sandy relief bill.

== Sandy funding and bids ==
Hurricane Sandy, which had landfall on October 29, 2012, caused a 13-foot tidal surge that inundated many coastal communities on the Jersey Shore, the Hudson Waterfront, and the New Jersey Meadowlands. As part of recovery funding, New Jersey received a waiver from HUD to use $25 million for advertising to promote tourism in the state the following season. The campaign was administered by the New Jersey Economic Development Authority, directed by Michelle A. Brown, which was responsible for the distribution of Sandy relief funds. Of four bidders, two were invited to do presentations to the board on March 15, 2013. The contract was awarded to the marketing firm MWW, based in East Rutherford.

== Production and release of TV ads ==
MWW's plan included six TV and radio spots, billboards (at Times Square and the Lincoln Tunnel, among other locations) a social media blitz, and an advertising jingle. The campaign targeted markets in New Jersey, New York City, New York State, Philadelphia and other parts of Pennsylvania, Baltimore, Washington, and eastern Canada.

MWW engaged a sub-contractor, Brushfire, Inc. to produce the TV commercials. Brushfire wrote the lyrics for the Stronger than the Storm theme song. Songwriter Brian Jones of Bang composed the music. The jingle for the 30-second television commercial was later turned into a full-length single.

The official roll-out of the "Stronger than the Storm" campaign coincided with the May 24, 2013 broadcast of the "Today Show" live from Seaside Heights, with Christie as co-host. During the show, NBC cameras cut to Lieutenant Governor Kim Guadagno and local officials cutting a blue ribbon stretched along the shoreline. The ads ran until September 1.

== Criticism of contract and Christie appearance ==
In April 2013, a bill was introduced into the New Jersey Assembly that would "prohibit the Governor or the Lieutenant Governor from appearing in certain announcements and federal or State-funded advertisements during gubernatorial election year." In May 2013, before the release of the commercials, Democrats in Assembly again questioned the use of the funds and the propriety of featuring the Christie family.

On August 4, 2013 the Asbury Park Press published an article that identified fees to be paid for employee compensation for MWW at $4.7 million, $2.2 million more than the other bidder. It also noted that the panel that made the decision to hire MWW was led by Brown, who had once borrowed $46,000 from Christie. On August 6, the paper reported that the firm had recently hired the former executive director of the Burlington County Republican Committee, Rich Levesque, who was noted as having "strong relationships over the years with many of Governor Christie's closest advisors as well as many of his cabinet appointees".

On August 8, Frank Pallone, the U.S. representative for New Jersey's 6th congressional district, wrote a letter to HUD requesting an inquiry into the potential misuse of disaster aid for political gain. Pallone said he thought Christie's Sandy ad campaign "smelled" and called for investigation to dispel any appearance of impropriety, drawing attention to the $2.2 million difference between the accepted bid and the next most expensive bid, which included no plans to include the governor in the ads. Barbara Buono, State Senator from the 18th Legislative District and Christie's opponent in the 2013 gubernatorial election, called the ads an abuse of the funds.

In a hearing on Sandy relief funds before the United States Senate Committee on Homeland Security and Governmental Affairs, U.S. Senator Rand Paul (R-Ky) said, "In New Jersey, $25 million was spent on ads that included somebody running for political office", and asked, "Do ya' think there might be a conflict of interest of [sic] there?"

In March 2014, The New Republic reported that documents requested in regard to the contract award decision were redacted to conceal committee members. Also in March 2014, Christie claimed that the uptick in tourism in 2013 was evidence that the campaign was successful. It was also announced the MWW would produce the 2014 season ads, without a new bidding process, and that Christie would not appear in the campaign called Going Strong.

== HUD audit ==
On January 14, 2014, HUD announced that it would review the expenditure. A press release stated that it is "an audit and not an investigation of the procurement process". The audit is based on irregularities with billing and adherence to the contract pricing, as determined by the federal government. MWW, in a press release, stated that it welcomed the review and that it had not presented the idea of Christie appearing in ads until after the contract was awarded. It said it was confident that it had followed correct billing procedures.

The federal audit released on September 3, 2014, did not find fault with the appearance of the governor and his family in the ad, but instead found fault with the mechanics of awarding the contract, specifically that key procurement requirements had not been met.

== Hoboken Sandy relief fund investigation ==
Several days after the HUD announcement, on January 18, 2014, Mayor of Hoboken Dawn Zimmer, appearing on MSNBC, claimed that Lt Governor Kim Guadagno and Richard Constable, director of the New Jersey Department of Community Affairs, had earlier insinuated to her that more Sandy relief funds would be released to the city if it approved a project in its northwest quadrant. On February 22, the Federal Bureau of Investigation interviewed members of the city's government and potential witnesses, who were instructed to preserve any evidence they might possess. They were also asked by the office of United States Attorney for the District of New Jersey, Paul Fishman, to not discuss the matter publicly. On January 31, the city acknowledged that it had received subpoenas from that office.

== See also ==
- 2013 Seaside Park, New Jersey fire
- Effects of Hurricane Sandy in New Jersey
- Fort Lee lane closure scandal – 2013–2014 New Jersey political scandal
- Governorship of Chris Christie
