= Governor's Office of Recovery and Rebuilding =

Government agency in New Jersey, United States

Governor’s Office of Recovery and Rebuilding

Agency overview
- Formed: 2012
- Dissolved: 2020
- Superseding agency: Governor’s Disaster Recovery Office
- Jurisdiction: New Jersey
- Headquarters: Trenton, New Jersey, U.S.
- Parent agency: Office of the Governor
- Website: https://nj.gov/gorr/

The Governor’s Office of Recovery and Rebuilding (GORR) was an office in New Jersey created in 2012 by New Jersey Governor Chris Christie to deal with the repercussions of Hurricane Sandy. The office was absorbed into the Governor’s Disaster Recovery Office by Governor Phil Murphy in 2020 in response to the COVID-19 pandemic in New Jersey.

== History ==
On Monday, October 29, 2012, Hurricane Sandy caused damage to New Jersey's housing, business, infrastructure, health, social service and environmental sectors. Marc Ferzan was appointed by New Jersey Governor Chris Christie on November 28, 2012, to coordinate recovery efforts, a role dubbed "storm czar", and charged with overseeing billions of dollars of relief aid in conjunction with the New Jersey Department of Community Affairs, the lead agency for distributing the funding.

The office announced the release of Sandy recovery funding in phases, first in April 2013 and then in February 2014.

Ferzan was responsible for creating numerous relief programs. The Star-Ledger characterized Ferzan's one and half year term as "tumultuous" and he himself as being too low-profile. The newspaper and the Press of Atlantic City criticized Ferzan for his lack of attendance at New Jersey Legislative meetings convened regarding Sandy recovery. When questioned about the state's decision-making process, Ferzan said officials were trying to balance transparency and not giving out "too much information."

Initially, disparities in distribution of housing construction funds for affordable housing came under scrutiny when it was revealed that areas least impacted by hurricane were receiving funds in greater proportion than heavily hit areas with the suggestion that towns with mayors friendly to Christie were favored. Ferzan said it was "unfathomable" that disaster aid programs could be used for political gain and that "politics has played absolutely no role in disaster recovery."

In 2013, the state engaged Hammerman & Gainer Inc. (HGI) to administer the federally funded, $1.2 billion Rehabilitation, Reconstruction, Elevation and Mitigation (RREM) program, which gives grants of up to $150,000 to homeowners to repair and rebuild homes damaged by Sandy. HGI's $68 million bid was $127 million lower than Tetra Tech, the only other bidder. The $68 million contract was originally meant to run from 2013 to 2016, but December 2013 was revised to end in January 2014 by mutual agreement. The RREM program was beset by problems, leading to complaints from some applicants and Democratic lawmakers. Severance from HGI's was due "performance problems" despite several months of "corrective action". HGI's bills totaled $51 million. It was paid $36 million, and $21 million currently the subject of an arbitration dispute. Ferzan said "services for HGI specifically were not needed."

On January 18, 2014, on Up with Steve Kornacki cable program, Hoboken Mayor Dawn Zimmer said that Lieutenant Governor Kim Guadagno and Commissioner of the New Jersey Department of Community Affairs Rich Constable had, on two separate occasions in May 2013, pressured her to support a Rockefeller Group development project in Hoboken's North End in exchange for the city receiving additional federal Sandy relief aid. On January 20, appearing on a CNN cable program, Zimmer stated that a month earlier, Marc Ferzan, Director of the Governor's Office of Recovery and Rebuilding had also pressured her to support more development in exchange for federal Sandy recovery funds. Following her television appearances, the Federal Bureau of Investigation and United States Attorney for the District of New Jersey met with Zimmer and reviewed and took as evidence a notebook journal in which she had written about the meetings. They also interviewed two of her aides and five other potential witnesses. Zimmer stated: "As their investigation proceeds, they have asked me to refrain from giving any additional interviews and I am respecting their request." The Christie administration officials categorically denied the allegations, a spokesman saying "It is very clear partisan politics are at play here as Democratic mayors with a political axe to grind come out of the woodwork and try to get their faces on television." Zimmer said she had not come forward until after the so-called Bridgegate scandal (which had broken 10 days earlier) because she thought her claims would be not taken seriously. On January 31, the city acknowledged that it had received subpoenas from the US Attorney.

An internal investigative was commissioned by the Christie administration and conducted by Randy Mastro of law firm Gibson, Dunn and Crutcher. Zimmer declined to participate. A report released in March 2014 said that Mayor Zimmer's allegations were, "in material respects, demonstrably false." and "whether intentional or not, it appears that Mayor Zimmer's subjective perception of events she has described do not reflect objective reality." Zimmer dismissed the report as "sadly predictable" and said she was still willing to repeat her allegations under oath, stating, "Randy Mastro could have written his report the day he was hired and saved the taxpayers the million dollars in fees." In editorials, The Star-Ledger and The New York Times labeled the report a "whitewash". as did 56% of New Jersey voters in an April 2014 survey by the Quinnipiac University Polling Institute.

Ferzan resigned July 8, 2014 and was replaced by taken by Terry Brody.

The office was absorbed into the new Governor’s Disaster Recovery Office by Phil Murphy in 2020 in response to the COVID-19 pandemic in New Jersey.

== See also ==
- Stronger than the Storm
- Governorship of Chris Christie
