= Michele Brown =

Michele Brown may refer to:

- Michele Brown (New Jersey official), American lawyer
- Michele Brown (high jumper) (born 1939), Australian high jumper

== See also ==
- Michelle Brown (disambiguation)
