= Fabiana Pierre-Louis =

American judge (born 1980)

Justice of the New Jersey Supreme Court
- Incumbent
- Assumed office September 1, 2020
- Appointed by: Phil Murphy
- Preceded by: Walter F. Timpone

Personal details
- Born: September 9, 1980 (age 45) New York City, U.S.
- Party: Democratic
- Spouse: Robert Reeves
- Children: 2
- Education: Rutgers University, New Brunswick (BA); Rutgers University, Camden (JD)

Fabiana Pierre-Louis (born September 9, 1980) is an American attorney and jurist serving as a justice of the New Jersey Supreme Court. She is the first Black woman to serve on the court. Pierre-Louis had previously worked as attorney-in-charge of the United States Attorney for the District of New Jersey's Trenton and Camden branches, and as a partner at the law firm of Montgomery McCracken.

== Early life and education ==
Pierre-Louis was born in New York City and spent her early childhood in Brooklyn before moving to Irvington, New Jersey. She is the daughter of Haitian American immigrants and speaks Haitian Creole fluently.

Pierre-Louis graduated from Union Catholic Regional High School in 1998. She earned a bachelor's degree from Rutgers University and a Juris Doctor from Rutgers Law School.

== Career ==
Pierre-Louis served as a law clerk for New Jersey Supreme Court Justice John E. Wallace Jr. Pierre-Louis worked for almost ten years as an assistant United States attorney in the office of United States Attorney for the District of New Jersey, and served as the attorney-in-charge of the U.S. Attorney's Trenton and Camden branches. After leaving that position she became a partner at the law firm of Montgomery McCracken in its Cherry Hill office.

On June 5, 2020, Governor Phil Murphy announced his intention to nominate Pierre-Louis to the New Jersey Supreme Court to replace Walter F. Timpone, who was approaching the state's mandatory retirement age for judges. On August 24, 2020, the New Jersey Senate's Judiciary Committee voted 11–0 to advance her nomination to the full Senate, and on August 27, 2020, the Senate voted 39–0 to confirm her to the Court.

Pierre-Louis was sworn in on September 1, 2020, one day after Justice Timpone stepped down. She is the first Black woman to serve on the court.

In 2023, the White House considered nominating Pierre-Louis for a vacancy on the United States Court of Appeals for the Third Circuit, however she withdrew her name from consideration.

== Personal life ==
Pierre-Louis and her husband, Robert Reeves, have two sons. As of 2020, the family resided in Mount Laurel, New Jersey.

== See also ==
- Governorship of Phil Murphy
- List of justices of the Supreme Court of New Jersey

Legal offices
Preceded by Walter F. Timpone	Justice of the New Jersey Supreme Court; 2020–present	Incumbent
