= Walter F. Timpone =

American judge

Associate Justice of the Supreme Court of New Jersey
- In office May 2, 2016 – August 31, 2020
- Appointed by: Chris Christie
- Preceded by: John E. Wallace Jr.
- Succeeded by: Fabiana Pierre-Louis

Personal details
- Born: Walter Francis Timpone; November 10, 1950 (age 75)
- Party: Democratic
- Education: St. Francis College (B.A.); New York University (M.A.); Seton Hall University (J.D.)

Walter Francis "Wally" Timpone (born November 10, 1950) is a former Associate Justice of the New Jersey Supreme Court, having been sworn on May 2, 2016. He was nominated to the Supreme Court by Governor Chris Christie and confirmed by the New Jersey Senate in April 2016. He resigned on August 31, 2020.

Timpone had previously been a partner in the law firm of McElroy, Deutsch, Mulvaney & Carpenter, LLP and a member of the New Jersey Election Law Enforcement Commission.

== Background ==
Timpone received a bachelor's degree from St. Francis College in Brooklyn, New York, in 1972, a master's degree in Special Education from New York University in 1974, and his Juris Doctor from Seton Hall University School of Law in 1979. He was law clerk to the late Honorable Vincent P. Biunno (United States District Court for the District of New Jersey). He was associated with the firm of Townley & Updike in New York City. He has been a resident of Cranford, New Jersey.

In January 1984, Timpone joined the office of United States Attorney for the District of New Jersey in Newark. He served until January 1994, including as Chief of Special Prosecutions. In 2002, he was considered for first assistant to Christie, United States Attorney for the District of New Jersey, but there were questions regarding the appointment arising from his contact with Robert Torricelli, who was under investigation at the time.

== Election Law Enforcement Commission ==
Timpone was appointed to the New Jersey Election Law Enforcement Commission (ELEC) by Christie in 2010 and served as its vice-president. He vacated his ELEC seat to take his seat on the Supreme Court.

He cited a conflict of interest as Christie's appointed vice-chairman of the ELEC when he stepped down as attorney for Bridget Anne Kelly, a defendant in the Fort Lee lane closure scandal court case.

Timpone recused himself in a matter regarding alleged election campaign expenditure and improper spending by Essex County Executive Joseph N. DiVincenzo, Jr. without explanation, leading to DiVincenzo's lawyers claims that there must be a quorum and making it impossible for the investigation to proceed. It was revealed on April 26, 2016, in that Timpone had recused and un-recused himself several times in the matter.

== New Jersey Supreme Court ==
Christie nominated Timpone, a Democrat, for the NJ Supreme Court in April 2016, withdrawing his February 2016 nomination of Monmouth County Superior Court Judge David F. Bauman, a Republican. The selection to fill a long-vacant seat on court has been matter of controversy about the political composition of the court since the governor's first term. Timpone's identification as a Democrat made the nomination more palatable to the New Jersey Senate, which conducts confirmation hearings. Christie said he would have preferred a Republican, but relieved that the controversy would be settled. As unwritten rule and senatorial courtesy, Timpone met with each of Union County's state senators Nicholas Scutari (D), Ray Lesniak (D), Tom Kean, Jr. (R). After meeting with the Senate Judiciary Committee, he was confirmed by the full New Jersey Senate on April 26, 2016. He was sworn on May 2, 2016.

It was revealed on the same day in a New Jersey appellate court that Timpone had recused and unrecused during a matter concerning the ELEC and DiVincenzo. In his meeting with the Senate Judiciary Committee Timpone said he would recuse himself in any cases which came before the Supreme Court involving DiVincenzo, with whom he is friendly.

In June 2020, Governor Murphy announced he would nominate Fabiana Pierre-Louis, a 39-year-old South Jersey resident and former US. attorney, as Timpone's replacement. Timpone resigned on August 31, 2020.

== See also ==
- Governorship of Chris Christie
- Philip Kwon
- List of justices of the Supreme Court of New Jersey

Legal offices
Preceded by John E. Wallace Jr.	Associate Justice of the New Jersey Supreme Court; 2016–2020	Succeeded by Fabiana Pierre-Louis
