= Dorothea O'C. Wefing =

American judge

Dorothea O'C. Wefing (born 1943) is a retired New Jersey judge.

Wefing is from Teaneck. She graduated from Manhattanville College and received her J.D. from Seton Hall University School of Law.

She was appointed a judge on the Superior Court on January 19, 1984. She was elevated to New Jersey Superior Court, Appellate Division, Part E. on September 1, 1993. She became presiding judge of Part E on September 1, 2004.

In June 2011, Wefing was named an interim member (Judge of the Appellate Division, Temporarily Assigned to the Supreme Court) of the New Jersey Supreme Court by Chief Justice Stuart Rabner to succeed Edwin Stern, who was appointed as an acting justice in 2010, during a period of controversy and conflict with the New Jersey Senate about the composition about its composition.

She retired in October 2012.

== See also ==
- Courts of New Jersey
- Mary Catherine Cuff
- Ariel A. Rodriguez
- Edwin Stern
- List of justices of the Supreme Court of New Jersey
