= Ariel Rodríguez =

Ariel Rodríguez may refer to:

- Ariel A. Rodriguez (1947-2017), American judge
- Ariel Rodríguez (footballer, born 1986), Costa Rican football midfielder
- Ariel Rodríguez (footballer, born 1989), Costa Rican football forward
