= Michele Brown (New Jersey official) =

American lawyer

Michele Brown is the president and CEO of Choose New Jersey, Inc. She became the CEO of the New Jersey Economic Development Authority (EDA) in 2012 and in 2015 became the head of Choose New Jersey, a private group which, similar to the EDA, seeks to enhance investment in the state.

== Life and career ==
Michelle Brown, a Trenton native, received a B.A. degree from Drew University and earned her law degree from Georgetown University Law Center. She became a federal prosecutor, later becoming Acting First Assistant US Attorney.

On August 18, 2009, Governor Chris Christie acknowledged that he had loaned $46,000 to Brown in 2007, while serving as her superior as the state's U.S. attorney, and that he had failed to report either the loan or its monthly $500 interest payments on both his income tax returns and his mandatory financial disclosure report to the New Jersey Election Law Enforcement Commission. In response to the disclosure of the financial relationship between Christie and Brown, State Senator Loretta Weinberg, the Democratic candidate for lieutenant governor, called on Brown to recuse herself from the task of retrieving U.S. Attorney’s Office records requested by the Corzine campaign under the Freedom of Information Act. On August 25, 2009, Brown resigned from her post, stating that she does not want to be "a distraction" for the office.

Brown was Appointments Counsel for Governor Chris Christie. She was appointed CEO of the New Jersey Economic Development Authority (EDA) in October 2012. During that time, the EDA administered $460 million of federal funds for Hurricane Sandy relief including the ad campaign Stronger than the Storm.

In January 2015, she became head of Choose New Jersey, a non-profit organisation that promotes business in the state.

== See also ==
- Governorship of Chris Christie
