= David F. Bauman =

American lawyer

David F. Bauman is a retired New Jersey Superior Court judge for Vicinage 9 Criminal Court sitting in Freehold, the county seat of Monmouth County, in the U.S. state of New Jersey.

== Background and education ==
Bauman is of maternal Japanese American descent. He attended Columbia University (1981) and Boston College Law School (1986) and served as a lawyer in the United States Marine Corps. He joined New Jersey–based Bressler, Amery & Ross in 1991 and became partner in 1998. Bauman and his wife, a lawyer, live in Holmdel Township.

== New Jersey state court ==
=== Appointment ===
Bauman was nominated to the Superior Court by New Jersey Governor Jon Corzine and confirmed by the New Jersey Senate in 2008. He was confirmed for life tenure in May 2015. (In New Jersey mandatory retirement age is seventy.)

=== Pledge of Allegiance ruling ===
In 2015, Bauman dismissed a case against the Matawan-Aberdeen Regional School District brought by a student of the district and the American Humanist Association that argued that the phrase “under God” in the Pledge of Allegiance created a climate of discrimination because it promoted religion, making non-believers “second-class citizens”. He said the student could choose to skip the pledge, but upheld a New Jersey law that says pupils must recite the pledge unless they have “conscientious scruples” that do not allow it. He noted; “As a matter of historical tradition, the words ‘under God’ can no more be expunged from the national consciousness than the words ‘In God We Trust’ from every coin in the land, than the words ‘so help me God’ from every presidential oath since 1789, or than the prayer that has opened every congressional session of legislative business since 1787.”

=== Supreme Court nominations ===
Governor of New Jersey Chris Christie nominated Bauman and Robert Hanna to the Supreme Court of New Jersey in December 2012. Neither received a confirmation hearing and the nominations were withdrawn. Christie again nominated Bauman in February 2016. The nomination is controversial, re-igniting an ongoing debate about the political composition of the Supreme Court, which began when Christie chose not to re-nominate sitting Supreme Court Justice John E. Wallace, Jr. for life tenure. Christie said there would be "ramifications" but did not specify what they were. In April 2016, Christie nominated Walter F. Timpone.

== See also ==
- Governorship of Chris Christie
- List of Asian American jurists
- Philip Kwon
