= Ron Berkowitz =

American journalist and entrepreneur

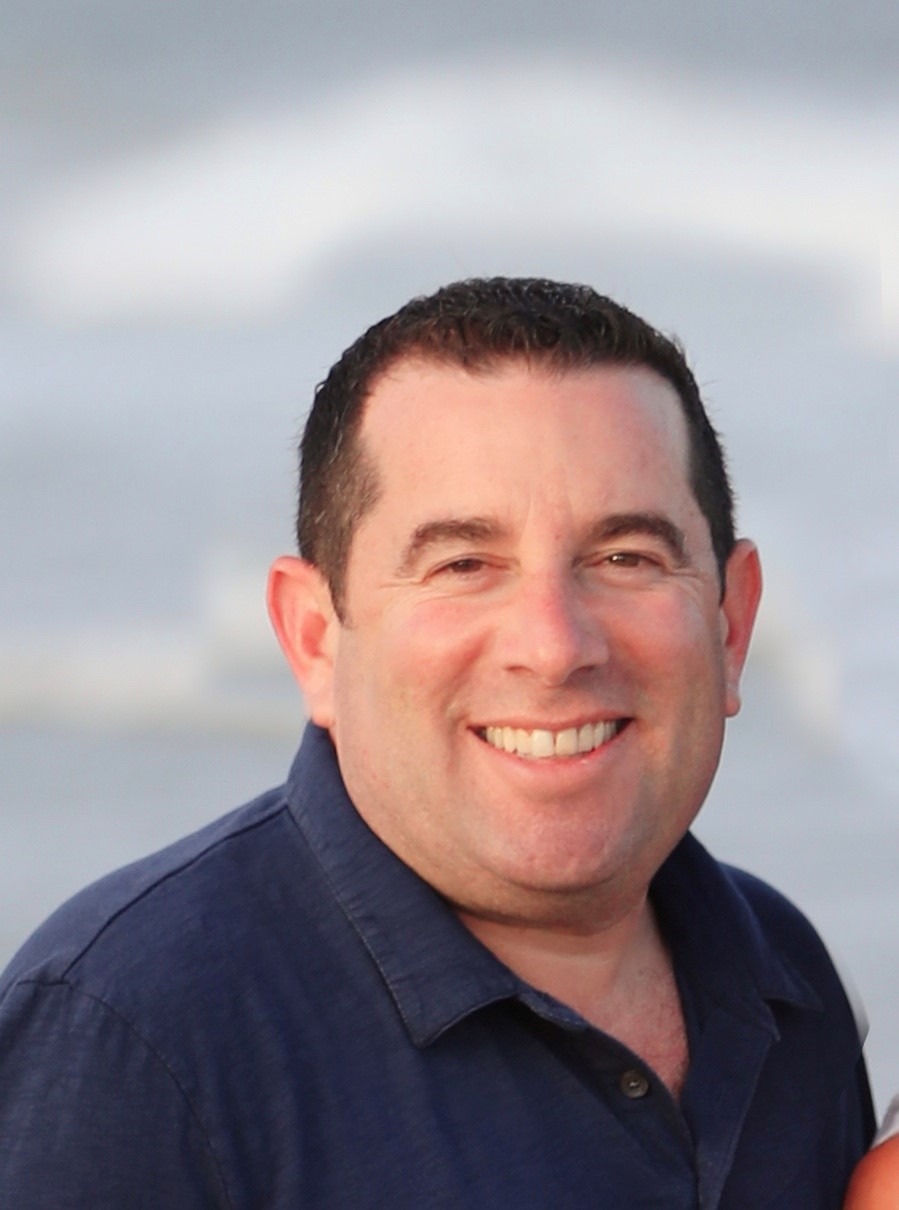
- Berkowitz (left) with executive chef Dino Gatto of Rao's and Dallas Cowboys quarterback Dak Prescott in February 2023
- Born: February 13, 1972 (age 54); New York City, U.S.
- Education: University of Miami (BS)
- Occupations: Publicist, entrepreneur
- Known for: Founder, CEO and president of Berk Communications; sports radio talk show host
- Spouse: Laurie Berkowitz

Ron Berkowitz is an American entrepreneur, publicist, and former sports journalist. He is the CEO and founder of the New York City-based Berk Communications.

== Early life and education ==
Berkowitz was born on February 13, 1972, in New York City, to parents Jack and Fran Berkowitz. He graduated from West Windsor-Plainsboro High School South in Princeton Junction, New Jersey.

Berkowitz attended the University of Miami, where he earned a Bachelor of Science in broadcast journalism and political science with a minor in sports management.

== Career ==
=== Sports broadcasting ===
While attending the University of Miami, Berkowitz worked for the university radio station WVUM doing play-by-play broadcasting for Miami Hurricanes baseball, football, and basketball teams. He broadcast the Sugar Bowl and the 1992 Orange Bowl.

After graduating, he began working as a reporter for WTOP in Washington, D.C., where he covered the Baltimore Orioles, Washington Wizards, and University of Maryland's Maryland Terrapins. He then was hired in a public relations job with the New York Yankees before becoming manager of publicity for FOX Television Cable Networks and FX in 1997. In 1999, he left the station and started Berk Communications.

=== Public relations ===
Berkowitz has represented Michael Rubin, Yoenis Céspedes, Robinson Canó, Kevin Durant, Dez Bryant, Meek Mill, and some of Jay-Z's business ventures. His long-standing clients include Victor Cruz, Justise Winslow, Miguel Cotto, Andre Ward, CC Sabathia, Geno Smith, Jérôme Boateng, Todd Gurley, Elton Brand, Armand de Brignac, ROC Nation, Roc Nation Sports, NFL, Disney Channel, D'usse, Robert Kraft, Puma, Body Armor, Van Jones, Aaron Judge, Rao's, Reform Alliance, and Tao.

In 2012, along with DJ Williams, Jon Beason, and Jonathan Vilma, he opened the restaurant Brother Jimmy's BBQ in Miami. In June 2013, he began representing Alex Rodriguez.

Berk Communications was acquired as an independent subsidiary by the MikeWorldWide in October 2015, with Berkowitz continuing to serve as president and chief executive officer of the company. In 2016, he received national media attention and recognition for his role in the makeover of New York Yankee, Alex Rodriguez, following a suspension for use of performance-enhancing drugs.

In April 2021, Berkowitz collaborated with CC Sabathia and the MLB Network to produce a non-traditional game telecast for the New York Yankees versus the Cleveland Indians. He began representing Aaron Judge in 2022.

Berkowitz began representing Rao's in October 2023. His firm will focus on supporting the opening of Rao's third restaurant location in Miami.
