= New Jersey Office of Homeland Security and Preparedness =

Government agency in New Jersey, United States

Office of Homeland Security and Preparedness
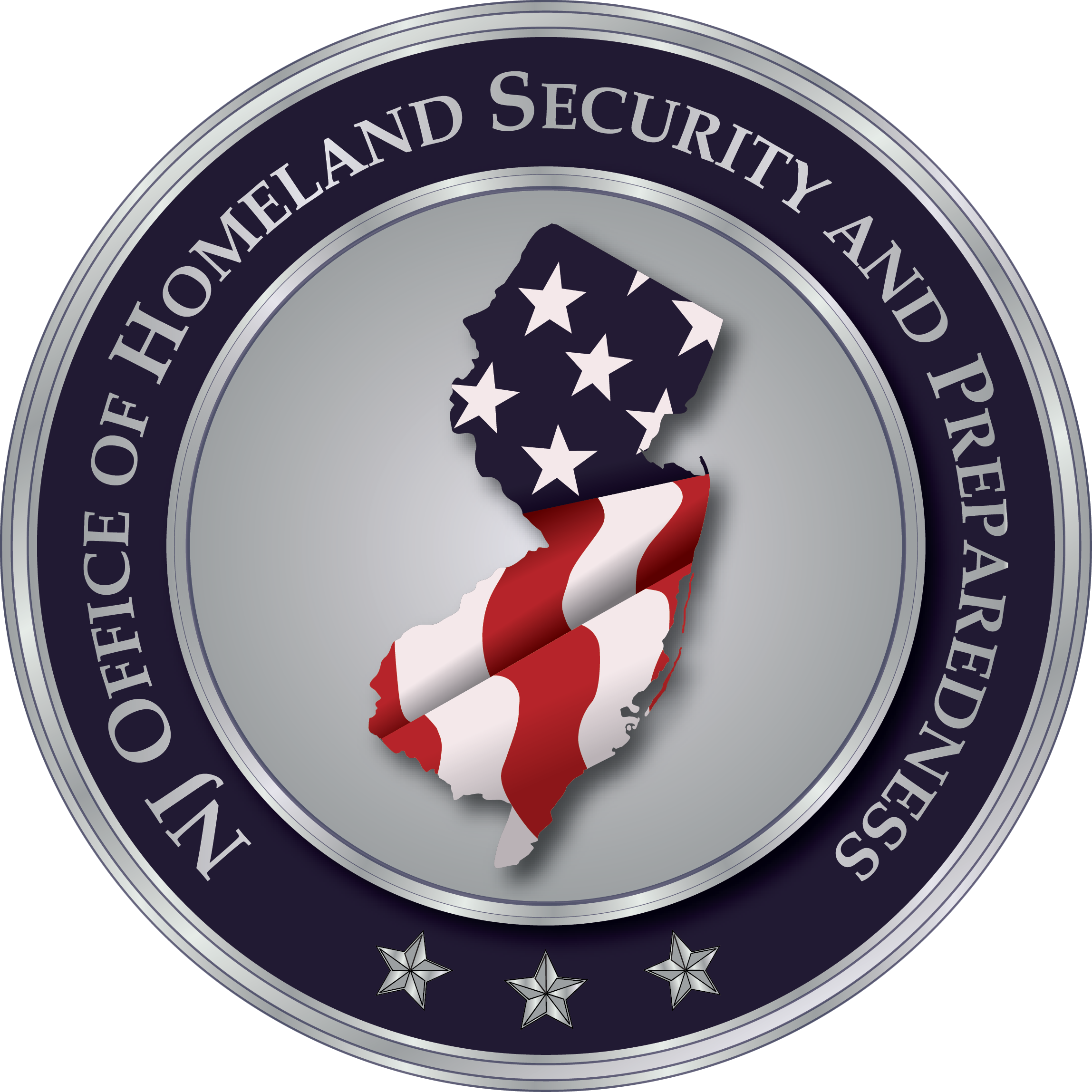

Agency overview
- Formed: 2006
- Preceding agency: Office of Counter-Terrorism
- Jurisdiction: New Jersey
- Headquarters: Trenton, New Jersey
- Agency executive: Laurie R. Doran, Director
- Website: www.njohsp.gov

The New Jersey Office of Homeland Security and Preparedness leads and coordinates New Jersey's counterterrorism, cybersecurity and preparedness efforts throughout the State.

== History ==
Shortly after the events of September 11, 2001, New Jersey's legislature and Governor passed and signed the [.HTM|Domestic Security Preparedness Act], which created the Domestic Security Preparedness Task Force within the Office of the Attorney General. In 2002, the Governor created an Office of Counterterrorism (OCT) by Executive Order, which remained under the Office of the Attorney General. OCT provided New Jersey with a single agency to lead and coordinate New Jersey's counterterrorism efforts with state, local and federal authorities and with the private sector.

OCT remained in place until 2006, when it was reorganized—again by Executive Order—into the NJOHSP, as a move to bolster New Jersey's resources for counterterrorism, critical infrastructure protection, emergency preparedness and federal grants management. NJOHSP was tasked with coordinating counterterrorism and emergency response efforts across all levels of government, law enforcement, emergency management, nonprofit organizations and the private sector.

Laurie R. Doran was first appointed as acting director of NJOHSP by Governor Phil Murphy in June 2017 before being appointed to serve as the Director of NJOHSP by Governor Phil Murphy in February 2022.

== Organizational structure ==
NJOHSP is composed of four Divisions: Division of Intelligence and Operations, Division of Preparedness, New Jersey Cybersecurity and Communications Integration Cell (NJCCIC) and the Division of Support Services.

=== Executive Staff ===
Director: Laurie R. Doran

New Jersey Cybersecurity and Communications Integration Cell: Michael Geraghty, Director

Division of Administration: Randall Richardson, Director

== Governorships ==
- Governorship of Phil Murphy
- Governorship of Chris Christie
