= Ariel A. Rodriguez =

American judge (1947–2017)

Ariel Antonio Rodriguez (November 8, 1947 – November 10, 2017) was a judge for the Courts of New Jersey including an acting Justice of the New Jersey Supreme Court (Judge of the Appellate Division, Temporarily Assigned to the Supreme Court).

== Early life and education ==
Rodriguez was born in Havana, Cuba in 1947 and came to the United States in 1960. He graduated from Rutgers University and Rutgers School of Law – Camden.

== Career ==
From 1973 to 1976, Rodriguez worked at Hudson County Prosecutor’s Office, after which he formed a law partnership and legal courses part-time at Hudson County Community College. He was named counsel to the Fireman's Fund Insurance Company in 1984.

Governor of New Jersey Thomas Kean nominated Rodríguez to the New Jersey Superior Court, taking the oath of office on December 5, 1985. Rodríguez sat on the Hudson Vicinage at the Hudson County Courthouse in Jersey City until September 1, 1993 in the family and civil and criminal divisions. He was re-nominated, with tenure, by Governor Jim Florio in 1992. He later sat on the New Jersey Superior Court, Appellate Division.

Rodriguez was appointed by Chief Justice Stuart Rabner to the Supreme Court in 2012 during a period of controversy and conflict with the New Jersey Senate about the composition of its members. He sat from October 1, 2012, to June 2014, after which he retired.

Rodriguez was a resident of Ramsey, New Jersey where he lived with his wife. Rodriguez had a son and a step-daughter. He died on November 10, 2017, two days after his 70th birthday.

== See also ==
- Mary Catherine Cuff
- List of justices of the Supreme Court of New Jersey
- Edwin Stern
- Dorothea O'C. Wefing
