= Jamie Fox (American government official) =

American political consultant (1954–2017)

- Born: James Patrick Fox; October 30, 1954; Elizabeth, New Jersey, U.S.
- Died: February 20, 2017 (aged 62); Camden, New Jersey, U.S.
- Education: Villanova University
- Occupation: Politician
- Political party: Democratic

James Patrick Fox (October 30, 1954 – February 20, 2017) was an American government official and political strategist. He twice served as New Jersey Commissioner of Transportation and also worked for the Port Authority of New York and New Jersey (PANYNJ).

== Biography ==
Fox was born in Elizabeth, New Jersey, and grew up in Union Township, Union County, New Jersey. His father was head basketball coach at St. Patrick High School, where Fox attended but was too short to play on the team. He attended Villanova University where he earned a degree in political science.

He was a long-time aide to former U.S. Sen. Robert Torricelli, serving as Torricelli's Chief of Staff in the U.S. Senate and the U.S. House of Representatives. He also served on the staff of former New Jersey Gov. James Florio.

From 1999 to 2001, Fox served as the Executive Director of the Democratic Senatorial Campaign Committee, while Torricelli was the chairman of the committee. In 2002, Fox was appointed by New Jersey Gov. James McGreevey as the New Jersey Commissioner of Transportation. While serving as Transportation Commissioner, Fox also served as Chairman of the New Jersey Transit Board of Directors.

In 2003, McGreevey appointed Fox as Chief of Staff to the Governor, a position he held until McGreevey's resignation in November 2004. Following McGreevey's resignation, he became Deputy Executive Director of the PANYNJ, where he administered the New York region's three airports, seaports, the PATH commuter train system and the development of the World Trade Center site.

He announced his intention to leave the Port Authority on July 1, 2007, in order to become a private consultant. While serving at the Port Authority, Fox also served as a Commissioner of the New Jersey Local Finance Board.

In September 2008, Fox became a Senior Advisor for the Obama/Biden campaign, working out of the Florida HQ in Tampa. Following the campaign, he returned to Fox and Shuffler. During this time he was lobbyist for United Airlines.

An art collector whose specialty was items related to his political travels, Fox was a resident of Lambertville, New Jersey.

In 2014, Governor Chris Christie nominated Fox to join his cabinet as New Jersey Commissioner of Transportation.

Fox was under investigation by the Justice Department. His communications were subpoenaed by federal investigators looking into corruption at the PANYNJ. Fox, in his capacity as a United Airlines lobbyist, was alleged to have helped arrange the so-called "Chairmans flight" for Port Authority Chairman David Samson. In September 2015, Fox was accused of violating ethic laws by two former state officials for not recusing himself from a meeting that discussed United Airlines involvement in Atlantic City Airport. He resigned in October 2015, further stating that the investigation did not influence the decision.

Fox died of heart failure in Camden, New Jersey, at the age of 62.

== See also ==
- Governorship of Chris Christie
