= Michael Kempner =

American businessman

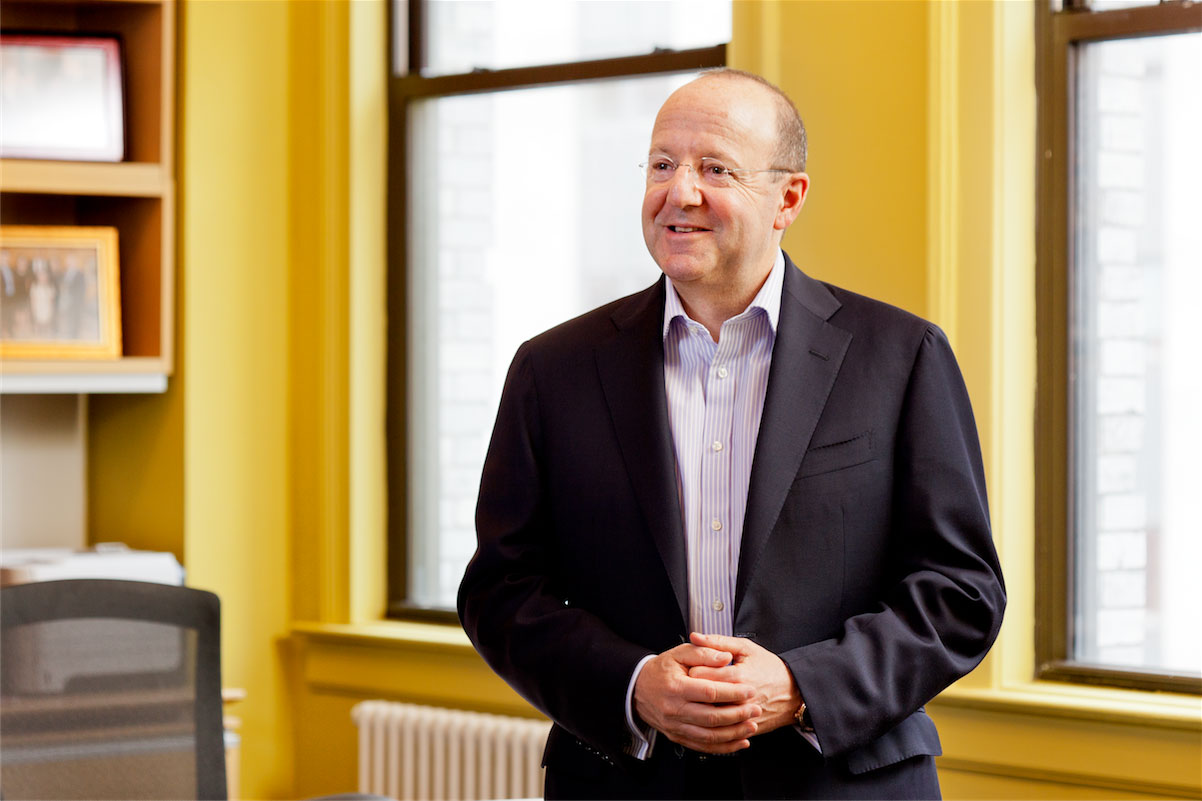

Member of the U.S. Agency for Global Media
- Incumbent
- Assumed office December 12, 2014
- Appointed by: Barack Obama
- Preceded by: Michael Lynton

Personal details
- Born: January 31, 1958 (age 68) Chicago, Illinois, U.S.
- Party: Democratic
- Spouse: Jacqueline Steinberg-Kempner
- Children: 3
- Education: American University
- Occupation: Businessman, political fundraiser
- Known for: Founder and CEO of MikeWorldWide; Former Deputy Finance Chair of the Democratic National Committee

Michael W. Kempner (born January 31, 1958) is an American businessman. He is the founder and CEO of MikeWorldWide, a public relations firm headquartered in New York, New York. Kempner is also known for his political contributions and fundraising for the Democratic Party.

== Early life and education ==
Kempner was born on January 31, 1958, in Chicago, Illinois. He graduated from American University School of Public Affairs, where he received a Bachelor of Science in 1981. In 2013, he received an Alumni Achievement Award from the university. In May 2018, he gave the commencement address to the university's School of Communications and was given an honorary PhD degree.

== Career ==
Kempner founded MWW Group in 1986. He is also a founding board member of ConnectOne Bancorp (NASDAQ: CNOB). In 2012, he received the International Business Awards' Public Relations Executive of the Year, the 2012 American Business Awards' PR Executive of the Year, and the 2012 PR News Awards' Professional of the Year. Kempner was presented The Gay And Lesbian Victory Fund's 2014 Corporate Leadership Award on behalf of MikeWorldWide.

Kempner became a member of the U.S. Agency for Global Media in December 2014. In March 2015, Kempner received PRWeek's PR Pro of the Year award. Kempner negotiated a buyout from Interpublic Group of Companies and re-branded the company as MikeWorldWide.

Kempner serves on the board of trustees of American University. He formerly served on the International Board of Goodwill Industries and the board for the Coalition for the Homeless in NYC. In 2016, Kempner was recognized on PolitickerNJ's Power List.

Kempner has been recognized by the NJBIZ Power 100 List every year from 2015 to 2021.

In 2017, he was named chairman of the board of directors of the Manhattan Chamber of Commerce. He is also a member of the Fulbright-Canada Scholarship Board.

He received a NJBIZ ICON Award in 2018.

In 2020, Kempner was elected to the PR Council Board of Directors.

In 2020, Kempner received the Observer award and was named to the PRWeek Hall of Fame.

== Political activity ==
Kempner is a government appointee and political fundraiser. He was one of Hillary Clinton's National Finance co-chairs and a lead fundraiser for her 2008 bid for the U.S. presidency. He later took up a "significant fundraising role" for President Barack Obama's 2008 campaign. Kempner was the Deputy Finance Chair of the Democratic National Committee and a member of the Obama for President National Finance Committee. He is a member of the DNC National Finance Committee, the New Jersey Finance Chair for the DNC, and a member of the New Jersey Government Advisory Council on Volunteerism and Community Service.

In 2010, Kempner hosted a $30,400/plate Democratic Party fundraising dinner attended by President Obama at his home in Cresskill, New Jersey.

In December 2010, President Obama appointed Kempner a member of the White House Council for Community Solutions, a council that works to "reengage disenfranchised youth."

In September 2012, he was listed by The New York Times as one of the top "bundlers" for Obama's 2012 reelection campaign, having raised $3 million in 2011 and through May 2012.

In 2013, Kempner donated $50,000 to Organizing for Action. In January 2014, President Obama nominated Kempner to the Broadcasting Board of Governors, which oversees federally controlled outlets that operate overseas. Kempner took office in December of that year.

Kempner is on the board of directors for three US Agency for Global Media networks: Radio Free Europe/Radio Liberty (RFE/RL); Radio Free Asia (RFA); and the Middle East Broadcasting Networks (MBN).

== Personal life ==
Kempner is married to Jacqueline Steinberg-Kempner.
