= New Jersey Open Public Records Act =

The New Jersey Open Public Records Act, N.J.S.A. 47:1A-1 et seq. (P.L. 2001, c. 404), commonly abbreviated OPRA, is a statute that provides a right to the public to access certain public records in the State of New Jersey, as well as the process by which that right may be exercised. In general, OPRA provides that "government records shall be readily accessible for inspection, copying, or examination by the citizens of this State, with certain exceptions, for the protection of the public interest." OPRA may be viewed as New Jersey's equivalent to the United States federal Freedom of Information Act.

== Law ==
OPRA has multiple features to it:

1. A request for public information must be completed, signed, and given to the keeper of the record that is requested. For requests to the State of New Jersey, OPRA requests for most information can be submitted online. A few other public agencies in New Jersey have online OPRA portals.
2. Public contracts are considered “immediate access” records
3. A request will not be considered as under the OPRA if:
  - The request for a record is sent to the wrong person. However, that person who receives the request must either redirect the request to the appropriate person or advise the requestor regarding who is the appropriate person.
  - The request does not state that it is being made pursuant to OPRA.
  - The request is not made in writing.
4. Fees for requesting information must be paid, unless you are exempt from paying the fee or the fee is unlawful.
5. Convicted criminals in New Jersey or anywhere else in the United States will not have access to public records if the records requested relate to the victim.
6. A request for information must be responded to within 7 business days after the request is received.
7. A request can be denied if the request would disrupt current operations of an agency and if the record keeper cannot reach a solution with the person requesting the documents.
8. A record keeper must tell the person requesting information why the record cannot be released.
9. Failure of a record keeper to respond to a request within 7 business days is considered a denial of the request.
10. If a request is denied, the person requesting the information can appeal the denial to the Government Records Council (GRC) of the Department of Community Affairs, or to New Jersey Superior Court. While there is no deadline to submit a complaint to the GRC, a complaint submitted to Superior Court must be filed within 45 days (calendar days, not business days) after the denial of access.
11. Information provided on a request form can be disclosed under the Open Public Records Act.

== Controversies ==
During the eight years of the Chris Christie administration, his office spent more than $1 million challenging OPRA requests, including court fees for illegally withholding information.

Although the Government Records Council is charged with settling OPRA release disputes, the underfunded and understaffed agency has a backlog of requests dating to 2014. In late March 2018, an estimated 10% remained outstanding, including some assigned to other government entities, but 347 flagged as GRC “work in progress”. One woman's official open records complaint took more than two years to resolve. What was supposed to be a more efficient means of challenging denied requests is characterized as an even more onerous system; one open records advocate described the situation as "justice delayed… justice denied".

In January 2018, outgoing Governor Chris Christie pre-emptively restricted the State Archives' release of his administration's public records, particularly electronic records. This came to light a few months later, in May 2018, when access to records between the Christie administration and the Kushner Companies, previously run by the president's son-in-law, Jared Kushner, was blocked by Christie's lawyer. Concerned open records advocates challenged Christie's action as contrary to the purpose of OPRA, which designates the State Archives as neutral public arbiter of records.

== See also ==
- Freedom of Information Act (United States), approximately equivalent federal legislation
- Freedom of information in the United States
