= Marit ayin =

Concept in halakha (Jewish law)

Mar'it-ayin (Mish.: מַרְאִית הָעַיִן; Modern Hebrew: מַרְאִית-עַיִן 'appearance to the eye'; Ashkenazic transliteration: maris ayin), is a concept in halakha (Jewish law) which prohibits certain actions which might seem to observers to be in violation of Jewish law, even if they are in fact permissible, in order to prevent onlookers from drawing false conclusions. For example, according to the Torah law it is forbidden to eat the blood of an animal, but the blood of fish is permissible. However, according to the principle of marit ayin, it is forbidden to eat the blood of fish, as an onlooker might believe the blood is from an animal, and mistakenly conclude that eating animal blood is allowed.

According to Ovadia Yosef, former chief Sephardic rabbi of Israel, marit ayin applies only when the onlooker might mistakenly interpret the action as violating a law given in the Torah.

== In private ==
There is a disagreement in the Talmud as to whether the concept of marit ayin applies in private. Beit Shamai believes that marit ayin applies even in private, whereas Beit Hillel believes that marit ayin does not apply in private.

== Changes over time ==
According to the Shulchan Aruch, if something which was prohibited in the times of the Talmud because of marit ayin is no longer a concern due to modern day circumstances, the prohibition is cancelled.

== Examples ==
Some examples of marit ayin include:

- Eating or drinking kosher food at a non-kosher restaurant
- Killing and eating an animal that is ben pekuah without shechita
- Hanging up wet clothes on Shabbat, since people may think they were washed that day

== See also ==
- Appearance of impropriety
- Chumra (Judaism)
