= Dave Weinstein =

American cybersecurity executive and government CTO

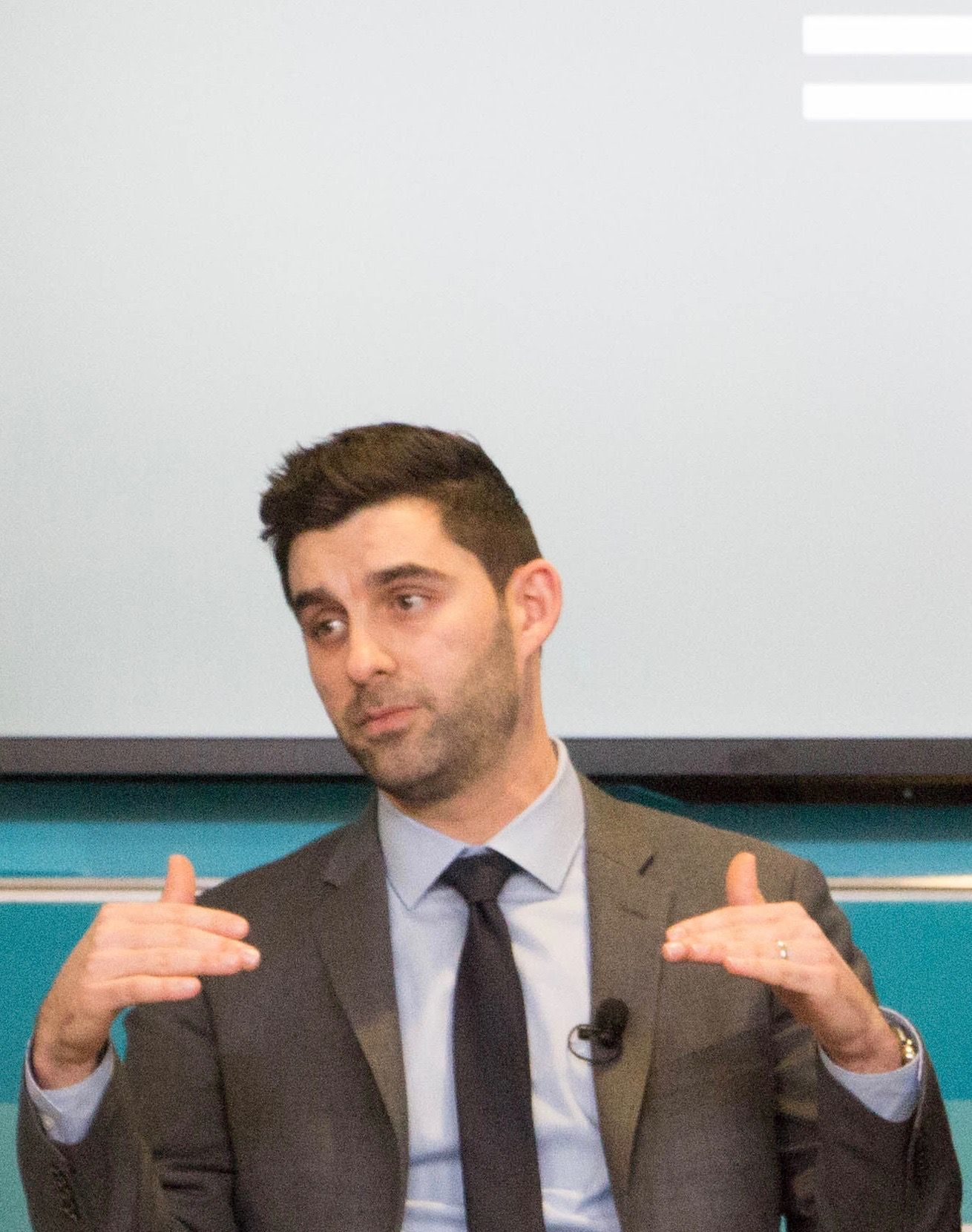
- Weinstein in January 2017 in Washington, DC

Chief Technology Officer New Jersey Office of Information Technology
- In office June 20, 2016 – January 16, 2018

Personal details
- Born: January 13, 1988 (age 38)
- Education: Johns Hopkins University; Georgetown University

David J. Weinstein (born January 13, 1988) is an American cybersecurity executive and the former chief technology officer of New Jersey. He previously served at U.S. Cyber Command.

== Education and early years ==
A native of Westfield, New Jersey, Weinstein attended Delbarton School in Morristown, New Jersey where he lettered in baseball and soccer. He graduated from Johns Hopkins University before earning his Master's degree from Georgetown University's School of Foreign Service.

Upon graduating from Johns Hopkins, Weinstein worked at U.S. Cyber Command as a military planner, where he advocated with Admiral (Ret.) James Stavridis, the former NATO Supreme Allied Commander, for splitting U.S. Cyber Command from the National Security Agency. Weinstein is an encryption advocate and has called the choice between security and privacy a “false dilemma”. He has argued for a more aggressive cyber deference regime, opining in The Wall Street Journal that, "If the U.S. and other digitally dense and dependent nations do not reserve the right to respond to cyberattacks with conventional means, we will be beholden to perpetrators of asymmetric cyberwarfare."

== Chief Technology Officer of New Jersey ==
On June 20, 2016 New Jersey Governor Chris Christie named Weinstein, then 28 years-old, New Jersey's first Chief Technology Officer, calling him "an individual, who truly understands how to manage cyber risk across a large enterprise." Prior to his appointment as CTO, Weinstein had "spearheaded the implementation of Governor Christie’s New Jersey Cybersecurity and Communications Integration Cell, the State’s central hub for cyber operations and resources that is the first of its kind in the nation." In June 2017, Weinstein oversaw the State's move to centralize IT under a single agency. Upon signing an executive order authorizing the move, the Governor said, "I'm tired of having each department own their own I.T. center" and "Dave Weinstein [is] a hell of a lot more qualified than I am to make these calls."

During his tenure he was praised for "bringing a fresh attitude" to information technology at the state level and instituting a "more vibrant and innovative culture" to attract talent and modernize public sector technologies. According to Politico, Weinstein's experience in both Washington and Trenton has led him to be "often called upon on the national scene to provide the state perspective." He was not retained by the incoming Murphy administration after the inauguration of Phil Murphy.

== Post-Government Career ==
In May 2018 Weinstein joined Israeli cybersecurity firm, Claroty. During this time he frequently commented on state-sponosored cyber threats to critical infrastructure, describing the 2015 hack of Ukraine's electric grid as "the crossing of the Rubicon." Weinstein, along with former NSA Director Admiral Michael S. Rogers, wrote in The Hill, "A wave of digital transformation is sweeping across the industrial world, pitting demands for greater efficiency and reliability against security. The information and communication technologies that power business and commerce are converging with the operational technologies that control our critical infrastructure — and with little consideration for the risk."

Weinstein joined management consulting firm in 2020 McKinsey & Company. He serves on the Board of Directors of Delbarton School.
