= Berk Communications =

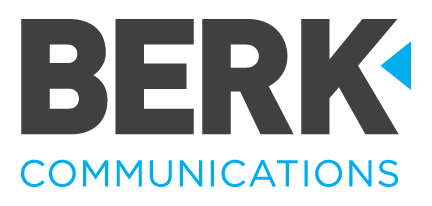
- Company type: Subsidiary
- Industry: Public relations Advertising; Digital Marketing
- Founded: 1999
- Headquarters: New York City
- Key people: Ron Berkowitz (founder and CEO), Marisa Carstens (SVP), Melanie Van Dusen (SVP)
- Owner: MWW
- Website: berkcommunications.com

Berk Communications is an American public relations firm that works in consumer lifestyle, food and beverage, travel, sports and entertainment. Ron Berkowitz is the company's founder and CEO. The firm's corporate headquarters is in New York City, New York, with an office in Los Angeles, California.

In 2021, Berk Communications was ranked 24th on the Global Top 250 PR Agency Ranking.

== History ==
Ron Berkowitz founded Berk Communications in 1999. MWWPR acquired a majority stake in Berk Communications in 2015 but the firm continues to operate as an independent subsidiary. The company is best known for representing D'usse Cognac, Kevin Durant, Robinson Canó, CC Sabathia, Roc Nation Sports, Tao Group, Tidal and Alex Rodriguez. Britney Spears hired Berk Communications in 2002 to promote Nyla, Spears' restaurant in Manhattan's Dylan Hotel. In February 2016, Berk signed with The Statler Hotel & Residences as public relations support through the hotel's relaunch. When baseball player Alex Rodriguez announced his retirement in 2016, it was also announced that Berk Communications would continue to work with Rodriguez. Rodriguez first signed with Berk in 2013.

O'Dwyer PR ranked Berk Communications as a top 10 PR Firm in the U.S. in sports and a top 25 PR Firm in the U.S. in food and beverage and travel and economic development.

O'Dwyer ranked Berk Communications as a top 5 PR Firm in the U.S. in sports, top 10 PR Firm in entertainment, and top 30 PR Firm in beauty, fashion and lifestyle, travel & economic development, and food & beverage for 2020.

In January 2017, Marisa Carstens joined Berk Communications from Text100 as a Senior Vice President. In July 2017, Melanie Wadden Van Dusen joined Berk Communications as a Vice President, Sports and Entertainment.

In October 2018, Berk Communications received five awards at the PRNEWS' Agency Elite Awards including a winning campaign in "Thought Leadership" on behalf of Frank Zaccanelli and honorable mentions in "Media Relations" on behalf of Frank Zaccanelli, "Nonprofit" on behalf of The Meatpacking District, and "Publicity" on behalf of D'USSE. The firm also shared a winning campaign with MWWPR in "Multicultural Marketing".

In April 2019, Berk received two nomination for the PRSA-NY Big Apple Awards for the "Best PR Campaign: Marketing Consumer Services (Restaurant/Bar and Retail)" on behalf of The Ainsworth and "Best PR Campaign: Events & Observances (Government, Associations and Nonprofit)" on behalf of the Los Angeles Tourism & Convention Board. In May 2019, the company received a Bronze Stevie Award in "Communications or PR Campaign of the Year – Food & Beverage" on behalf of The Ainsworth from The American Business Awards.

In September 2019, Ryan Mucatel joined Berk Communications as Chief Operating Officer and Executive Vice President. That same month, Berk Communications received an honorable mention award in "Media Relations" on behalf of Grand Isle Resort & Spa at the PRNEWS' Platinum PR Awards. In December 2019, Berk Communications was ranked at No. 44 on The Observer’s annual PR Power 50 List. The firm also added Alex Pitocchelli as a Vice President.
