= Michelle Brown =

Michelle Brown may refer to:

- Michelle P. Brown (born 1959), British manuscript curator and scholar
- Michelle Brown (politician) (born 1969), British politician
- Michelle Brown, fictional character in the TV film Identity Theft: The Michelle Brown Story

== See also ==
- Michele Brown (disambiguation)
