= British Journal of American Legal Studies =

- Discipline: American law, British law
- Language: English
- Edited by: Anne Richardson Oakes

Publication details
- History: 2012–present
- Publisher: Centre for American Legal Studies
- Frequency: Biannual
- Open access: Yes
- License: Creative Commons Attribution-NonCommercial-NoDerivs 3.0 License
- Impact factor: 0.2 (2024)

Standard abbreviations
- ISO 4: Br. J. Am. Leg. Stud.

Indexing
- ISSN: 2049-4092 (print); 2719-5864 (web)
- LCCN: 2013222357
- OCLC no.: 834096783

Links
- Journal homepage; Online archive

The British Journal of American Legal Studies is a British biannual peer-reviewed legal journal covering the study of United States law. It was established in 2012 and is published by Birmingham City University. The journal focuses on issues related to constitutional law in the United States, including human rights, legal and political theory, socio-legal studies, and legal history, preferably work that draws connections between American, British, and European studies. The editor-in-chief is Anne Richardson Oakes (Birmingham City University).

== Abstracting and indexing ==
The journal is abstracted and indexed in:

- EBSCO databases
- Emerging Sources Citation Index
- HeinOnline
- Modern Language Association Database
- Scopus

According to the Journal Citation Reports, the journal has a 2024 impact factor of 0.2.
