= New Jersey Cybersecurity and Communications Integration Cell =

American government agency

- Formation: May 20, 2015
- Location: NJ Regional Operations Intelligence Center, West Trenton, New Jersey
- Region served: New Jersey
- Products: Cyber Threat Intelligence
- Website: www.cyber.nj.gov

The New Jersey Cybersecurity and Communications Integration Cell (NJCCIC), also known as the New Jersey Office of Homeland Security and Preparedness' (NJOHSP) Division of Cybersecurity, is the first American state-level information sharing and analysis organization in the United States that exchanges cyber threat intelligence and conducts incident response for governments, businesses, and citizens in New Jersey. Located at NJ’s Regional Operations and Intelligence Center (ROIC), and acting in a cyber fusion center capacity the NJCCIC is composed of staff from NJOHSP, the NJ Office of Information Technology, and the NJ State Police. The NJCCIC's nomenclature is derived from its federal counterpart, the National Cybersecurity and Communications Integration Center, which encompasses the U.S. Department of Homeland Security's Computer Emergency Readiness Team (US-CERT).

== History ==
On May 20, 2015, Governor Chris Christie signed an Executive order to establish the New Jersey Cybersecurity and Communications Integration Cell, proclaiming that "protecting the citizens and public and private institutions within the State of New Jersey from the threat of cybersecurity attacks is the priority of [his] Administration." Governor Christie's directive followed a Presidential Executive Order from February 2015 signed at Stanford University "encourag[ing] the development and formation of Information Sharing and Analysis Organizations (ISAOs)...organized based on sector, sub-sector, region, or any other affinity..." The formation of the NJCCIC also coincided with the aftermath of crippling and costly cyber-attacks against Rutgers University, New Jersey's largest public academic institution. The NJCCIC played a role in protecting Pope Francis during his 2015 visit to New York City and Philadelphia.

== Leadership ==
Jared Maples was named Director of the New Jersey Office of Homeland Security and Preparedness (NJOHSP) by Governor Philip Murphy on April 17, 2018. In his role, he serves as the federally designated Homeland Security Advisor (HSA) to the Governor and is the Cabinet-level executive responsible for coordinating and leading New Jersey’s Counterterrorism, Cybersecurity, and Emergency Preparedness efforts.

Michael Geraghty is New Jersey's Chief Information Security Officer and the first Director of the NJCCIC. Director Geraghty manages the day-to-day functions of the NJCCIC.

== Mission ==
The NJCCIC acts in a clearinghouse capacity providing New Jersey with a resource to coordinate cyber security information sharing and incident reporting, perform cybersecurity threat analysis, and promote shared and real-time situational awareness between and among public and private sectors. Beyond just sharing cyber threat intelligence, the NJCCIC also provides strategies and tactics that businesses, as well as state, county and local governments, academic institutions, and other organizations, can implement to mitigate current and emerging threats. Additionally, the NJCCIC manages a membership-based information-sharing platform where members receive cyber alerts, advisories, training announcements and bulletins directly via email, maintains an active social media presence and manages the cyber.nj.gov website to provide free cybersecurity resources.

== The "Garden State Model" for cybersecurity ==
The NJCCIC received praise from Stanford University's Center for Internet and Society for "innovating" on cybersecurity information sharing at a pace and scale that few states have achieved. Incident response is currently limited to Executive Branch agencies in New Jersey, but according to a November 2015 study, "State of the States on Cybersecurity" by the Pell Center for International Relations and Public Policy, there are "plans to create an NJ CERT", or New Jersey Computer Emergency Readiness Team, to be deployed statewide.

== Partnerships ==
On July 8, 2015, the New Jersey Cybersecurity and Communications Integration Cell partnered with the Financial Services Information Sharing and Analysis Center (FS-ISAC) to "share and analyze cyber threat information on behalf of New Jersey's banking institutions".

In January 2016, the NJCCIC and the National Health Information Sharing and Analysis Center announced a partnership to improve cybersecurity information sharing with New Jersey’s healthcare providers.

Since April 2021, the NJCCIC has been the title sponsor and partner of JerseyCTF, a worldwide cybersecurity competition organized by New Jersey Institute of Technology (NJIT) students. Director Geraghty spoke with John Elliott from WCBS-TV during the 2023 iteration and highlighted the importance of hands-on cybersecurity training in developing the skills needed for cyber defense.
