= MikeWorldWide =

American public relations firm

- Formerly: MWWPR
- Type: Private
- Industry: Public Relations, Marketing
- Founded: 1986
- Founder: Michael Kempner, CEO
- Headquarters: New York City
- Services: Corporate Communications; Consumer Brand Marketing; Crisis Management; Influencer & Creator Marketing; Social Media Marketing; Public Affairs; Research & Data Strategies; Sports & Entertainment communications
- Website: https://www.mww.com/

MikeWorldWide (formerly MWWPR) is a public relations firm. The company works in public relations and marketing, technology, digital and social media marketing, public affairs and government relations, corporate communications, healthcare, sustainability, visual branding, crisis management, influencer and creator marketing, and sports and entertainment. Michael W. Kempner is the company’s founder and CEO. The firm's corporate headquarters is in Hasbrouck Heights, New Jersey; the firm's operating headquarters is in New York City.

== History ==
Michael Kempner founded MikeWorldWide in 1986. MikeWorldWide grew to the 4th largest independent public relations firm in the U.S., and Kempner sold the company to the Interpublic Group of Agencies in 2000.

In 2010, Kempner led a management led buy-out.

On January 14, 2014, the Department of Housing and Urban Development announced that it would review the expenditures for the Stronger than the Storm media campaign, commissioned in mid-2013 by the New Jersey Economic Development Authority to promote tourism in the aftermath of Hurricane Sandy; MikeWorldWide was the prime contractor. The audit found that the company had done "nothing improper" in the content of its marketing campaign. Governor Chris Christie later dismissed criticism of the campaign, citing it contributed to record tourism dollars in 2013.

In 2012, MikeWorldWide received media attention for a campaign on behalf of Brigadier General Jeffrey Sinclair, a former deputy commander of the 82nd Airborne Division charged with forcible sodomy and sexual misconduct. MikeWorldWide senior vice president Josh Zeitz, who acted as spokesperson for Sinclair's team during the campaign, stated that the firm aimed to ensure a fair trial by providing hundreds of pages of supporting documentation. Zeitz added that the agency protected the accuser's anonymity and was "dead set against" campaigning against her. The firm launched a website with publicly available documents in favor of Sinclair to discredit the prosecutor and accuser. MikeWorldWide nominated itself for a Platinum PR Award in the crisis management category for this work. Zeitz said that the nomination was for crisis management work, explaining that doing so is common in the public relations field.

The company acquired Los Angeles-based Macias Media Group, an LGBT marketing firm, in March 2014. In October 2014, MikeWorldWide received The Gay And Lesbian Victory Fund's 2014 Corporate Leadership Award for its LGBT practice and support of the LGBT community. In 2014, MikeWorldWide expanded into Britain with the purchase of Parys Communications, and also acquired the UK-based business-to-business PR firm Braben Communications in November 2014. The company was recognized as one of the Top Places to Work in PR and Best Places to Work in New Jersey.

In 2016, the Scholastic Corporation brought a lawsuit against MikeWorldWide in a payment dispute. The case was voluntarily dismissed in May 2016.

In 2018, the company launched a Sports and Entertainment practice and opened a new location in Charlotte, North Carolina. In April 2021, the company rebranded to MikeWorldWide and also acquired London-based agency, Chameleon.

In June 2022, a CNBC report found that American automotive and energy company Tesla, Inc. paid MikeWorldWide to monitor a Tesla employee Facebook group and to conduct research on Tesla union organizers on social media from 2017 to 2018. MikeWorldWide monitored discussions on social networks alleging unfair labor practices at Tesla and monitored discussions on a sexual harassment lawsuit. An MikeWorldWide spokesperson told CNBC that the agency consulted with Tesla from 2017 to 2018 on a broad employee communications engagement. The spokesperson added that reviewing media coverage and public social conversation about a company is a common practice for gaining insights into a company's public perception. Former and current Tesla employees told CNBC that they believe the company continues to monitor its workers on social media.

In November 2024, MikeWorldWide launched Everywhere, an in-house agency specializing in influencer, content, and social media marketing.

In February 2025, MikeWorldWide acquired Berk Communications, a public relations firm that specializes in sports, entertainment, and consumer lifestyle. In April 2025, the agency opened an office in Mexico City as part of its global growth strategy.

In January 2026, MikeWorldWide launched a supply chain, logistics and infrastructure communications practice.
