= New Jersey Office of Information Technology =

Government agency in New Jersey, United States

Office of Information Technology

Agency overview
- Formed: 1998
- Preceding agency: Office of Telecommunications and Information Services
- Jurisdiction: New Jersey
- Headquarters: Trenton, New Jersey, U.S.
- Agency executive: Chris Rein, Chief Technology Officer
- Website: http://www.state.nj.us/it/

The New Jersey Office of Information Technology (NJOIT) is the sole government provider of information technology services for the Executive Branch of the New Jersey Government. The Office of Geographic Information Services falls under its purview.

== History ==
The office was originally created as the Office of Telecommunications and Information Systems "in–but–not–of" the Department of Treasury on September 4, 1998, by executive order Governor of New Jersey of Christine Todd Whitman. The new Office of Information Technology assumed all the responsibilities of the former Office of Telecommunications and Information Systems in 1984 by executive order by Governor Thomas Kean. Following an executive order by Governor Jon S. Corzine, the 2007 Office of Information Technology Reorganization Act established the Office of Information Technology in its present form. State IT services were further consolidated under the agency following an executive order by Governor Chris Christie in 2017.

The agency's first chief technology officer (CTO) a cabinet position, was Dave Weinstein. was appointed by Chris Christie in 2016 and left the position just before the inauguration of Phil Murphy in January 2018. Murphy appointed Chris Rein.

== Mission ==
The Office of Information Technology specializes in application development and hosting, network engineering, database administration, security operations, and other technology disciplines to service the business operations of dozens of agencies in the state capital, Trenton, and the rest of the state. It oversees compliance with policies and standards, including security to procurement.

NJOIT processes information for a wide variety of department and agency programs including, but not limited to, centralized payroll, budget, revenue, general accounting, pensions, nursing home claims, food stamps, public assistance, institutional patient billings, caseload activities, unemployment compensation, disability insurance, employment and personnel services, engineering services, air monitoring, and criminal justice.

== Office of Geographic Information Services ==
The Office of Geographic Information Services was created by executive order in 2001 within the New Jersey Office of Information Technology. The Geographic Information Services is responsible for developing policies, standards and guidelines for the use of geographic information resources and maintains the New Jersey Geographic Information Network.

== See also ==
- New Jersey Cybersecurity and Communications Integration Cell
