= Appearance of impropriety =

Legal concept

The appearance of impropriety is a phrase referring to a situation which to a layperson without knowledge of the specific circumstances might seem to raise ethics questions. For instance, although a person might regularly and reliably collect money for her employer in her personal wallet and later give it to her employer, her putting it in her personal wallet may appear improper and give rise to suspicion of commingling. It is common practice in the business and legal communities to avoid even the appearance of impropriety.

== In the Bible ==
1 Thessalonians 5:22, in the King James Version of the Bible, says "Abstain from all appearance of evil."

== See also ==
- Commingling
- Conflict of interest
- Scandal
- Marit ayin
- Caesar's wife must be above suspicion

== Sources ==
- Pines, Zygmont (2024-02-01). "Magical Thinking and Appearance-based Recusal". British Journal of American Legal Studies. 13 (1): 67–146. doi:10.2478/bjals-2023-0011. ISSN 2719-5864.
- Kim, Matthew Dale (2022). "For Appearance's Sake: An Empirical Study of Public Perceptions of Ethical Dilemmas in the Legal Profession (May 9, 2020). For Appearance's Sake: An Empirical Study of Public Perceptions of Ethical Dilemmas in the Legal Profession". Ohio State Law Journal. 83: 529–599. SSRN 3596957.
- McKoski, Raymond J. (2010). "Judicial Discipline and the Appearance of Impropriety: What the Public Sees Is What the Judge Gets" (PDF). Minnesota Law Review. 94: 1914.
- Rotunda, Ronald D. (October 5, 2005). "Alleged Conflicts of Interest because of the "Appearance of Impropriety"" (PDF). Hofstra Law Review. 33 (4): 1141–1147. Archived from the original (PDF) on September 14, 2006.
- Gray, Cynthia (2005). "Avoiding the Appearance of Impropriety: With Great Power Comes Great Responsibility". University of Arkansas at Little Rock Law Review. 28: 63–101.
