= New Jersey Election Law Enforcement Commission =

Independent governmental association in New Jersey, United States

The New Jersey Election Law Enforcement Commission (ELEC) is an independent governmental agency that is responsible for monitoring the integrity of campaign finances in elections in New Jersey. The Commission was established in 1973. Candidates for all public elections in New Jersey are required to file contribution and expenditure reports. The ELEC also administers public financing for those running in primary or general elections for Governor of New Jersey. The Commission administers aspects of New Jersey's "pay-to-play" laws, registration of governmental affairs agents (lobbyists), and quarterly disclosure of lobbying activity, and requires personal financial disclosure statements for certain candidates.

The original four members appointed by Governor William T. Cahill in 1973 were two Republicans: former Rep. Florence Dwyer of Elizabeth, and Frank Reiche, a Princeton attorney, and two Democrats: Sidney Goldmann, a former presiding judge of the state appellate court, and former Camden County Judge Bartholomew Sheehan.

Normally composed of four members, two Democrats and two Republicans, selected by the Governor of New Jersey, the commission had a vacant seat since November 2011, the second year of the governorship of Chris Christie, until about 2016. By 2016, the Commission fell to two members, and thus, lacked a quorum to issue fines, however, in March 2017, the commission was restored to four members.

Under the Election Transparency Act, passed in March 2023, Governor Phil Murphy was allowed to appoint four commissioners, two of whom would serve two-year terms, and two of whom would serve three-year terms, after which they would revert to the normal six-year term length. Additionally, he was able to make these appointments without needing them to be confirmed by the state Senate, on a one-time basis. The three commissioners at the time, Eric H. Jaso (R), Chairman, Stephen M. Holden (D), Commissioner, and Marguerite T. Simon (D), Commissioner, all resigned in protest. On June 15, 2023, Murphy named Thomas H. Prol (as chairman, D), former Assemblyman Ryan Peters (R), Clark Municipal Prosecutor Jon-Henry Barr (R), and former Senior Deputy Attorney General Norma Evans (D) to serve on the panel.
