= Hurricane Sandy relief bill =

- Long title: To temporarily increase the borrowing authority of the Federal Emergency Management Agency for carrying out the National Flood Insurance Program.
- Nicknames: Hurricane Sandy relief bill
- Announced in: the 113th United States Congress
- Sponsored by: Rep. Scott Garrett (R, NJ-5)
- Number of co-sponsors: 19

Codification
- Acts affected: National Flood Insurance Act of 1968, Statutory Pay-As-You-Go Act of 2010, S. Con. Res. 13 (111th Congress).
- U.S.C. sections created: 42 U.S.C. 4016(a), 2 U.S.C. 933(g),

Legislative history
- Introduced in the House as H.R. 41 by Scott Garrett (R–NJ) on January 3, 2013; Committee consideration by House Financial Services Committee, House Budget Committee; Passed the Senate on January 4, 2013 (voice vote); Passed the House on January 4, 2013 (354/67); Signed into law by President Barack Obama on January 6, 2013

The Hurricane Sandy relief bill (Pub. L. 113–1 (text) (PDF), H.R. 41, 127 Stat. 3, enacted January 6, 2013) is a law enacted by the 113th United States Congress, in the aftermath of Hurricane Sandy.

The Act amended the National Flood Insurance Act of 1968 to increase from $20.725 billion to $30.425 billion the total amount of notes and obligations (i.e. federal borrowing authority) which may be issued by the Administrator of the Federal Emergency Management Agency (FEMA), with the President's approval, for the National Flood Insurance Program.

== Procedural history ==
=== House of Representatives ===
The Bill was introduced into the House of Representatives on January 3, 2013 by Rep. Scott Garrett (R-N.J.), with 44 cosponsors.

On January 4 the Bill was considered by the House. The vote was made under suspension of the rules, so it required a two-thirds majority. It was passed 354-67.

=== Senate ===
The Bill was passed in the Senate by a voice vote on January 4.

=== President ===
The Bill was presented to President Obama on January 4 and signed into law on January 6.

== Background ==
On December 28, 2012, the Senate passed H.R. 1 of the 112th Congress, with an amendment in nature of a substitute, by a vote of 62 – 32. The bill would have provided for $60.4 billion in supplemental disaster assistance. While it was not enacted by Congress as a whole, its Title VI (Section 601) became the Hurricane Sandy relief bill.

The Budget Control Act of 2011 (BCA) authorized two types of spending to exceed the established spending caps: disaster and emergency. While emergency spending is not subject to the caps in the BCA, spending for disaster relief is calculated by taking the average of the previous ten years' disaster relief spending (excluding the highest and lowest spending years).

== Provisions ==
The Bill amended section 1309(a) of the National Flood Insurance Act of 1968 to temporarily increase the borrowing authority of the Federal Emergency Management Agency for the purpose of carrying out the National Flood Insurance Program from $20,725,000,000 to $30,425,000,000 (a difference of $9.7 billion).

The bill also contains funding for the National Oceanic and Atmospheric Administration (NOAA), intended for repairs and upgrades of its facilities and equipment.

== Costs ==
This amount is designated as emergency spending, pursuant to section 4(g) of the Statutory Pay-As-You-Go Act of 2010 (2 U.S.C. § 933(g)).

The amounts of new budget authority, outlays, or revenue that result from a provision designated as an emergency in a PAYGO measure are not included in CBO estimates.
