= New Jersey Economic Development Authority =

Government agency in New Jersey, United States

State of New Jersey Economic Development Authority

Agency overview
- Preceding agency: New Jersey Commerce Commission
- Jurisdiction: New Jersey
- Headquarters: 36 West State Street, Trenton, NJ 08625
- Agency executive: Evan Weiss, Chief Executive Officer
- Website: https://www.njeda.gov/

The New Jersey Economic Development Authority (EDA) is an independent government entity in the U.S. state of New Jersey dedicated to broadening and expanding the state's economic base.

The EDA creates public-private partnerships to provide access to capital by New Jersey's business community. The EDA's primary emphasis is on providing access to funds for small and mid-size businesses and nonprofit organizations. The EDA also supports entrepreneurial development through training programs. Real estate development projects that will create business opportunities and enhance community revitalization efforts, are another goal pursued by the EDA.

== 2019 audit ==
In January 2019, Governor Phil Murphy signed an executive order to initiate an audit of the tax incentives made to businesses by the New Jersey Economic Development Authority. It found numerous cases were tax credits given during the governorship of Chris Christie were given under false pretenses.
