= John E. Wallace Jr. =

American judge (born 1942)

John E. Wallace Jr. (born 1942) is a former Associate Justice of the New Jersey Supreme Court.

== Early life and education ==
Wallace was born on March 13, 1942, in Pitman, New Jersey. He played varsity baseball, basketball and football for his final three years at Pitman High School, graduating in 1960. He received a B.A. from the University of Delaware in 1964, where he was initiated as a brother of the Alpha Epsilon Pi fraternity, and received his J.D. from Harvard Law School in 1967. He served in the United States Army from 1968 and reached the rank of Captain before leaving the army in 1970.

== Career ==
Wallace was a member of many bars, including the Gloucester and Camden County Bar Associations, the New Jersey State Bar Association, the Garden State Bar Association, the American Bar Association, and the National Bar Association. He has also actively served on the New Jersey Supreme Court Task Force for Minority Concerns, the New Jersey Ethics Commission, the Judiciary Advisory committee on Americans with Disabilities Act, the supreme Court Special Committee on Matrimonial Litigation, and the Appellate Division Rules Committee. He chaired the Supreme Court Ad Hoc Committee on Admissions.

Wallace was a partner in the law firm of Atkinson, Myers, Archie & Wallace. He also served in that time period as the Municipal Judge for Washington Township. When he was nominated, Wallace's career was as a New Jersey Superior Court Judge (Appellate Division), a position which he held since 1984.

Wallace was nominated by Governor of New Jersey James E. McGreevey on April 12, 2003, to serve as a justice of the New Jersey Supreme Court. He was confirmed by the New Jersey Senate on May 19, 2003. He was sworn in as an associate justice by the Chief Justice, Deborah T. Poritz, in a private ceremony held on May 20, 2003. According to The New York Times, Wallace was "a sound jurist and political moderate who was the court’s only African-American."

On May 3, 2010, Governor Chris Christie declined to re-nominate Justice Wallace, whose term expired on May 20, 2010. He is the first Justice of the Supreme Court to be denied tenure in more than a half-century since the adoption of the 1947 State Constitution.

Judge Wallace holds several honors from certain legal organizations. These include the Orient of New Jersey Dedicated Service Award from the Valley of Camden (awarded in 2000), the Washington Township Board of Education Appreciation Award (awarded in 2000), Association of Black Women Lawyers of New Jersey (awarded in 2001), and the Van J. Clinton award from the Garden State Bar Association (awarded in 2002).

== Personal life ==
Justice Wallace lives in Sewell in Washington Township, Gloucester County, New Jersey, with his wife Barbara (who has served several terms as the mayor of Washington Township, NJ); the couple has five children.
