= List of people from East Orange, New Jersey =

Following is a list of notable people who were born in, residents of, or otherwise closely associated with East Orange, New Jersey.

== Academia ==
- Margaret Clapp (1910–1974), eighth president of Wellesley College
- Eric P. Hamp (1920–2019), Indo-European linguist and professor at the University of Chicago
- Robert Peace (1980–2011), scholar and teacher, subject of The Short and Tragic Life of Robert Peace
- Newton Phelps Stallknecht (1906–1981), philosopher, president of the Metaphysical Society of America
- Janet Sorg Stoltzfus (1931–2004), educator who established the Ta'iz Cooperative School in Yemen
- Richard Thaler (born 1945), professor at the University of Chicago Booth School of Business, and recipient of the 2017 Nobel Memorial Prize in Economic Sciences
- Clarence Watters (1902−1986), organist an director of the music department at Trinity College
- Marion Thompson Wright (1902–1962), first African-American woman in the United States to earn her Ph.D. in history
- Gabrielle Yablonsky (born 1939), art historian specializing in Bhutanese art

== Art and architecture ==
- Sarah Charlesworth (1947–2013), conceptual artist and photographer
- Freeman Craw (1917–2017), typeface designer
- Randall Davey (1887–1964), painter and art educator
- Branson DeCou (1892–1941), photographer and traveler
- Dorothy Eaton (1893–1968), visual artist
- Edward Townsend Howes (1877–1964), architect and artist
- Marietta Patricia Leis (born 1938), multimedia artist and poet
- Robert Opel (1939–1979), photographer and art gallery owner most famous for streaking across the stage during the 46th Academy Awards

== Business ==
- Balanda Atis (born 1972/73), cosmetic chemist at L'Oréal
- Robert H. B. Baldwin (1920–2016), chairman of Morgan Stanley
- George Whitman (1913–2011), proprietor of the Paris bookstore Shakespeare and Company

== Entertainment ==
- David Ackroyd (born 1940), actor, who came to prominence in The Secret Storm and Another World
- John Amos (1939–2024), actor
- S. H. Barnett (1908–1988), screenwriter, won an Academy Award in the category Best Original Screenplay for the 1964 film Father Goose
- Betty Bronson (1906–1971), television and film actress, began her career during the silent film era
- Frank E. Butler (1852–1926), marksman who performed in Wild West variety shows, lived at 22 Eppirt Street between 1905 and 1908
- Kerri Chandler (born 1969), deep house DJ and producer
- Bill Chinnock (1947–2007), singer-songwriter and guitarist; part of the Asbury Park music scene with Bruce Springsteen in the late 1960s
- Chino XL (1974–2024), hip-hop lyricist
- Robyn Crawford (born 1960), author, producer; former assistant to and creative director for Whitney Houston
- Frances Day (1907–1984), actress, cabaret singer, and television celebrity
- DJ Kay Gee, member of Naughty by Nature
- Philip Egner (1870–1956), director of the West Point Band and composer of the West Point fight song "On, Brave Old Army Team"
- Eugenia Gilbert (1902–1978), actress of the silent film era
- Red Grammer (born 1952), children's music composerr
- Bessie Mecklem Hackenberger (1876–1942), saxophone soloist
- Robert David Hall (born 1947), actor, best known for CSI: Crime Scene Investigation
- Slide Hampton (1932–2021), jazz trombonist
- Ann Harding (1902–1981), theatre, motion picture, radio, and television actress
- J. C. Hayward (born 1945), news anchor at WUSA, first female news anchor in Washington, D.C., and the first African American female news presenter
- Lauryn Hill (born 1975), singer-songwriter, rapper, producer, and actress
- Whitney Houston (1963–2012), singer and actress
- Janis Ian (born 1951), singer-songwriter
- KayGee (born 1969 as Kier Lamont Gist), DJ and record producer, and member of hip hop trio Naughty by Nature
- Lady London (born 1995), rapper and songwriter
- Luxx Noir London (born 1999), drag performer, most known for competing on the fifteenth season of RuPaul's Drag Race
- Gordon MacRae (1921–1986), actor, singer, born in East Orange
- Dorian Missick (born c. 1975), actor, known for Six Degrees and the video game Grand Theft Auto: Vice City Stories
- Naturi Naughton (born 1984), singer and actress; member of the group 3LW
- Annie Oakley (1860–1926) sharpshooter who performed in Wild West variety shows, lived at 22 Eppirt Street between 1905 and 1908
- Queen Latifah (born 1970), rapper, singer, model and actress
- Eddie Rabbitt (1941–1998), country music singer-songwriter
- Vin Rock, member of Naughty by Nature
- Shareefa (born 1984), R&B singer
- Tom Spratley (1914–1987), film and television actor, known for playing "Curly Jackson" in the 1973 film The Sting
- Treach, member of Naughty by Nature
- Dionne Warwick (born 1940), singer
- Barrence Whitfield (born 1955), soul and R&B vocalist, best known as the frontman for Barrence Whitfield & the Savages
- Bruce Williams (1932–2019), radio host

== Law ==
- Robert L. Carter (1917–2012), civil rights leader and United States district judge
- Vincent S. Haneman (1902–1978), associate justice of the New Jersey Supreme Court 1960–1971
- Worrall Frederick Mountain (1909–1992), justice of the New Jersey Supreme Court 1971–1979
- Stewart G. Pollock (born 1932), justice of the Supreme Court of New Jersey 1979–1999
- C. Thomas Schettino (1907–1983), justice of the New Jersey Supreme Court 1959–1972

== Literature and journalism ==
- Stephen Berg (1934–2014), poet, editor, translator, and educator
- James Blish (1921–1975), science fiction writer
- Herbert Brucker (1898–1977), journalist, editor-in-chief of the Hartford Courant
- Troy CLE, author of The Marvelous Effect (set in East Orange)
- Vincent Czyz (born 1963), writer and critic of speculative fiction
- Carolyn Gold Heilbrun (1926–2003), author, wrote mystery novels under the pen name of Amanda Cross
- Fred Hills (1934–2020), literary editor
- Robert Hillyer (1895–1961), poet and professor of English literature, won a Pulitzer Prize for poetry in 1934
- Karen Hunter (born 1966), journalist, publisher, talk show host, and co-author of several books
- Naomi Long Madgett (1923–2020), poet
- Marion Clyde McCarroll (1891–1977), writer, journalist, and columnist; first woman issued a press pass by the New York Stock Exchange
- Elizabeth Peer (1936–1984), journalist
- Alfred Stanford (1900–1985), novelist
- Tom Verducci (born 1960), sports journalist
- Valerie Wilson Wesley (born 1947), mystery writer

== Military ==
- William J. Fallon (born 1944), United States Navy admiral; commander of United States Central Command
- Harold Geiger (1884–1927), pioneer in U.S. Army aviation and ballooning
- John F. Madden (1870–1946), U.S. Army brigadier general
- Donald J. Strait (1918–2015), flying ace in the 356th Fighter Group during World War II and a career officer in the United States Air Force

== Politics ==
- Harry A. Augenblick (1888–1948), served in the New Jersey General Assembly
- Robert Bowser (1935–2022), mayor of East Orange
- Stephanie R. Bush (born 1953), served in the New Jersey General Assembly
- Eunice Dwumfour (1993–2023), member of the borough council of Sayreville, New Jersey, from 2021 until her assassination
- Franklin W. Fort (1880–1937), United States House of Representatives
- Ellen Garwood (1903–1993), philanthropist and activist known for her contributions to the Contras in Nicaragua
- Edward E. Gnichtel (1869−1933), New Jersey General Assembly
- Mary Jeanne Hallstrom (1924–2006), Illinois House of Representatives, was born in East Orange
- Constance W. Hand (1895–1982), served six terms in the New Jersey General Assembly
- Balozi Harvey (1940–2016), diplomat and community organizer
- Frances Cox Henderson (1820–1897), First Lady of Texas; established the Good Shepherd home after moving to East Orange
- LeRoy J. Jones Jr. (born 1957), member of the New Jersey General Assembly
- Anne Lindeman (1932–2001), Arizona state legislator
- Stephen A. Mikulak (1948–2014), New Jersey General Assembly
- Newton Edward Miller (1919–2012), New Jersey General Assembly
- Daniel F. Minahan (1877–1947), United States House of Representatives
- Sheila Oliver (1952–2023), lieutenant governor of New Jersey
- C. Milford Orben (1895–1975), served five terms in the New Jersey General Assembly
- Albert L. Vreeland (1901–1975), United States House of Representatives
- James Wallwork (1930–2024), served in both houses of the New Jersey Legislature
- Laurence Hawley Watres (1882–1964), United States House of Representatives, lived in East Orange during his retirement
- William H. Wiley (1842–1925), United States House of Representatives, East Orange township committee president, co-founder of publishing company John Wiley & Sons

== Science and medicine ==
- Caroline Herzenberg (1932–2025), physicist
- Ernest Lester Jones (1876–1929), head of the United States Coast and Geodetic Survey
- Elizabeth Losey (1912–2005), conservationist, recognized as being the first female refuge biologist
- William Lowell Sr. (1863–1954), dentist; inventor of a wooden golf tee patented in 1921
- Clara Maass (1876–1901), nurse, died as a result of volunteering for medical experiments to study yellow fever
- Evelyn Groesbeeck Mitchell (1879–1964), entomologist and physician

== Sports ==
- Jamal Anderson (born 1972), former NFL running back
- Billy Ard (born 1959), NFL guard, played for the New York Giants and Green Bay Packers
- Ed Baker (born 1948), former professional football quarterback who played in the NFL for the Houston Oilers
- Jim Barnes (1886–1966), professional golfer
- Norman Batten (1893–1928), race car driver
- Alvin Bowen (born 1983), gridiron football linebacker, played in the NFL for the Jacksonville Jaguars
- Clyde Bradshaw (born 1959), basketball player, played for the DePaul Blue Demons
- Rob Burnett (born 1967), former professional football player who was a defensive end for 14 seasons in the NFL
- Bill Clarken (1903–1951), football player and coach, who played in the National Football League for the Orange Tornadoes, despite never playing collegiate football
- Bob Clifford (1913–2006), head football coach at Colby College and at the University of Vermont
- Jahan Dotson (born 2000), professional football wide receiver for the Philadelphia Eagles
- Rasul Douglas (born 1995), players for the Buffalo Bills of the National Football League
- Gale Fitzgerald (born 1951), competed in two Olympic pentathlons, winning a silver medal in 1975 at the Pan American Games
- Chris Fletcher (born 1948), played for the San Diego Chargers during his seven-year NFL career
- David Garrard (born 1978), quarterback, played for the NFL's New York Jets
- Tate George (born 1968), former basketball player, played with the New Jersey Nets for three of his four NBA seasons
- Althea Gibson (1927–2003), tennis player
- Brian Hill (born 1947), former coach of the Orlando Magic
- Monte Irvin (1919–2016), Major League Baseball player inducted as a member of the Baseball Hall of Fame
- Malcolm Jenkins (born 1987), football player for the Philadelphia Eagles
- Jarrod Johnson (born 1969), played for the Pittsburgh Steelers, San Diego Chargers and the Sacramento Surge of the World League of American Football
- David Jones (born 1968), former NFL tight end, played for the Los Angeles Raiders in 1992
- Brandin Knight (born 1981), former professional basketball player, brother of Brevin Knight
- Brevin Knight (born 1975), former NBA point guard, played for nine teams during his 13-year career, brother of Brandin Knight
- Eric Lane (born 1974), running back who played in the NFL for the New York Giants
- Cyril Langevine (born 1998) - Guyanese–American basketball player in the Israeli Basketball Premier League
- Elliott Maddox (born 1947), Major League Baseball outfielder, played for both the New York Mets and New York Yankees
- Teana Muldrow (born 1995), professional basketball player, has played in the WNBA for the Seattle Storm and Dallas Wings
- Jabrill Peppers (born 1995), football player for the New York Giants of the NFL
- Chickie Geraci Poisson (born 1931), former field hockey player and coach
- Perry Scott (1917–1988), American football player and coach, played in the NFL for the Detroit Lions
- Ben Sirmans (born 1970), American football coach and former running back; running backs coach for the Green Bay Packers of the National Football League
- Daryl White (born 1951), former professional football offensive guard who played in the NFL for the Detroit Lions
- Jocelyn Willoughby (born 1998), basketball player for the New York Liberty of the WNBA
