= Samuel S. Ferster =

American politician

New Jersey State Assemblyman
- In office January 1938 – July 1941
- Preceded by: Leo P. Carlin
- Succeeded by: Gloanna W. MacCarthy

Deputy Commissioner of the New Jersey Department of Labor
- In office 1951–1954

Personal details
- Born: Samuel S. Ferster; March 15, 1898 Russia
- Died: March 28, 1967 (aged 69) Newark, New Jersey, U.S.
- Party: Republican
- Spouse: Ruth Ferster
- Children: Joan Corson and Lila Botnick

Samuel S. Ferster (March 15, 1898 – March 28, 1967) was an American attorney and Republican Party politician who served in the New Jersey General Assembly from 1938 to 1941, and later served as a Judge of the New Jersey Workers Compensation Court.

== Early years ==
Ferster grew up in Newark and Rahway. He graduated City College of New York and New Jersey Law School. He served in the U.S. Air Force during World War I from 1917 to 1919. He was a member of the 612th Aero Squadron.

== Political career ==
In 1937, he was elected to the New Jersey State Assembly, representing Essex County. Among the incumbent Democrats he defeated in that election was Leo P. Carlin, who would go on to serve as Mayor of Newark. He was re-elected in 1938, 1939, 1940, and 1941. Among the Democrats he defeated in 1940 were Peter W. Rodino, who would go on to serve 40 years as a Congressman, and John J. Francis, who would serve fourteen years as an Associate Justice of the New Jersey Supreme Court.

During his nearly four years as an Assemblyman, Ferster served as Chairman of the Assembly Labor Committee.

Ferster led a protest of Nazi persecution of minorities in Orange, New Jersey on February 25, 1939.

In 1940, Governor A. Harry Moore signed legislation sponsored by Ferster that required New Jersey students to attend school at least until the age of 16, and prohibited children under the age of 12 from working.

Governor Charles Edison appointed him to serve as a Commissioner of the North Jersey District Water Supply Commission in 1941. He resigned from the State Assembly in July 1941, following his confirmation by the New Jersey State Senate.

In 1951, Ferster joined the Administration of Governor Alfred Driscoll as the Deputy Commissioner of the New Jersey Department of Labor and as Director of the Division of Compensation.

Governor Robert B. Meyner appointed Ferster to serve as a Judge of the New Jersey Workers Compensation Court.

Following his death in 1967, friends and colleagues established the Samuel J. Ferster Scholarship at Rutgers University Law School.

== Electoral history ==
=== New Jersey General Assembly (1940) ===
12 Seats Elected At-Large from Essex County

Winner	Party	Votes	Loser	Party	Votes
Samuel S. Ferster	Republican	177,775	John J. Francis	Democrat	136,241
Dominic A. Cavicchia	Republican	177,314	Mary C. O'Malley	Democrat	135,862
Edgar Williamson, Jr.	Republican	176,145	Joseph N. Braff	Democrat	134,503
Frank S. Hargrave	Republican	175,359	John A. Couch, Jr.	Democrat	132,699
Olive C. Sanford	Republican	175,280	Peter W. Rodino	Democrat	132,393
Frank S. Platts	Republican	174,989	James A. Callahan	Democrat	132,262
Lester E. Mahr	Republican	174,580	William J. Brine	Democrat	131,947
Adolph Wegrocki	Republican	172,400	Peter Niemiec	Democrat	131,146
C. Milford Orban	Republican	171,242	Roger M. Yancey	Democrat	129,866
Jacob S. Glickenhaus	Republican	171,008	William R. Connors, Jr.	Democrat	129,270
Constance W. Hand	Republican	170,522	Norman B. Grobert	Democrat	128,873
R. Graham Huntington	Republican	170,182	Mercedes Uth	Democrat	125,898
