= John J. Francis (judge) =

American judge

Associate Justice of the New Jersey Supreme Court
- In office 1957–1973
- Preceded by: Joseph Weintraub
- Succeeded by: Mark A. Sullivan

New Jersey Appellate Court Judge
- In office 1952–1957

Essex County Court of Common Pleas Judge
- In office 1948–1952

South Orange Village Trustee
- In office 1942–1944

Personal details
- Born: June 19, 1903 East Orange, New Jersey
- Died: July 5, 1984 (aged 81) Summit, New Jersey
- Party: Democratic
- Spouse: Penelope C. Francis
- Children: John J. Francis, Jr. Hugh P. Francis; Cynthia Weber
- Education: Rutgers University Law School
- Occupation: Lawyer

John Joseph Francis (June 19, 1903 – July 5, 1984) was an American Democratic Party politician and jurist who served as an associate justice of the New Jersey Supreme Court from 1957 until his retirement in 1972.

== Early life ==
Francis was born on June 19, 1903, in East Orange, New Jersey. He received a law degree from Rutgers University Law School in 1925 and a master's degree in law from New York University Law School in 1947. He was admitted to the bar in 1926. He served as President of the Essex County Bar Association from 1942 to 1943, and as an Associate Editor of The New Jersey Law Journal from 1944 until 1947 and again from 1973 until his death in 1984.

== Political career ==
In 1940, Francis became a candidate for the New Jersey General Assembly. He finished 13th out of 24 candidates in a race for 12 Essex County Assembly seats. Francis was the top vote getter among the Democratic candidates, receiving 136,241 votes. One of his running mates in the 1940 legislative contest was Peter W. Rodino, who would go on to serve 40 years in Congress, 14 of them as chairman of the House Judiciary Committee.

Francis was elected village trustee (councilman) in South Orange, New Jersey, in 1942.

In 1944, Francis became a candidate for the U.S. House of Representatives in New Jersey's 11th congressional district. Incumbent Republican Frank L. Sundstrom defeated him by 6,210 votes, 58,586 (51.73%) to 52,376 (46.25%).

== Judicial career ==
Francis was appointed to serve as an advisory master of the Court of Chancery by Chancellor A. Dayton Oliphant in 1947. In 1948, Governor Alfred Driscoll, a Republican, nominated Francis to serve as a Judge of the Essex County Court of Common Pleas. He was elevated to the Appellate Division in 1952. In 1957, Governor Robert B. Meyner nominated him to serve as an associate justice of the New Jersey Supreme Court.

In 1960, Francis wrote a unanimous opinion in Henningsen v. Bloomfield Motors, Inc., where the court ruled that automobile dealers and manufacturers were liable for defective cars despite a standard warranty intended to absolve them. This was considered a landmark decision in the expansion of product liability manufacturer's liabilities for defective products. He was also the author of a unanimous 1966 decision that the state could not seek the death penalty in the retrial of a convicted murderer who had already received a sentence of life in prison.

Among Francis' law clerks was John J. Degnan, who would later serve as Attorney General of New Jersey.

== Later years ==
Francis retired in 1972, a year before he turned 70, the mandatory retirement age for Judges in New Jersey. He served as Of Counsel to the law firm of Francis & Berry. Governor Richard J. Hughes appointed him to serve as Chairman of a special State Advisory Committee on Judicial Conduct in 1974. The panel sought to insure the public of the state judicial system's "probity, objectivity and freedom from outside pressure of any kind." He also became an Associate Editor of The New Jersey Law Journal, a job he held in the 1940s. He also served on the New Jersey State Commission of Investigation (SCI).

At the time of his death in 1984, Francis was residing in Summit with his wife, Penelope C. Francis (1906–1990). They had two sons and a daughter.

== Electoral history ==
=== New Jersey General Assembly (1940) ===
12 Seats Elected At-Large from Essex County

Winner	Party	Votes	Loser	Party	Votes
Samuel S. Ferster	Republican	177,775	John J. Francis	Democrat	136,241
Dominic A. Cavicchia	Republican	177,314	Mary C. O'Malley	Democrat	135,862
Edgar Williamson, Jr.	Republican	176,145	Joseph N. Braff	Democrat	134,503
Frank S. Hargrave	Republican	175,359	John A. Couch, Jr.	Democrat	132,699
Olive C. Sanford	Republican	175,280	Peter W. Rodino	Democrat	132,393
Frank S. Platts	Republican	174,989	James A. Callahan	Democrat	132,262
Lester E. Mahr	Republican	174,580	William J. Brine	Democrat	131,947
Adolph Wegrocki	Republican	172,400	Peter Niemiec	Democrat	131,146
C. Milford Orban	Republican	171,242	Roger M. Yancey	Democrat	129,866
Jacob S. Glickenhaus	Republican	171,008	William R. Connors, Jr.	Democrat	129,270
Constance W. Hand	Republican	170,522	Norman B. Grobert	Democrat	128,873
R. Graham Huntington	Republican	170,182	Mercedes Uth	Democrat	125,898
