= East Orange High School =

Defunct high school in New Jersey, US

Location
- Walnut and Winans Street; East Orange, New Jersey 07018; United States; 40.753953°N 74.2206°W

Information
- Type: Public high school
- Established: 1891
- Closed: 2002
- School district: East Orange School District
- Grades: 9–12

East Orange High School was a comprehensive community public high school serving students in ninth through twelfth grades from 1891 to 2002 in East Orange, in Essex County, in the U.S. state of New Jersey. For most of its existence, the school operated as one of the two secondary schools of the East Orange School District.

== History ==
The original East Orange High School building, facing Winans Street, opened to students in 1891. An addition on Walnut Street was added in 1953. The school was closed when East Orange Campus High School opened in 2002, combining both East Orange High School and Clifford Scott High School. Demolition of the old high school began in 2005.

In 1933, African American student and future civil rights activist Robert L. Carter staged a protest against an official school policy that restricted black students to using the school's pool on Fridays after the school had closed, with male and female students segregated by gender, after which the pool would be emptied, cleaned out and refilled with water before the start of the next school week. Having read that the New Jersey Supreme Court banned the practice of racial segregation, and despite threats of expulsion from teachers and his inability to swim, Carter entered the pool with fellow white students during times when access to the pool was forbidden to black students, ultimately leading the district to close the pool.

While serving in New Jersey General Assembly from 1964 to 1972, Kenneth T. Wilson was also employed as a teacher at East Orange High School, where he taught civics and American history.

In September 2009, a new $143 million, 309,000-square-foot (28,700 m^{2}) facility opened on the former East Orange High School site. This school consisting of an elementary school and middle/high school, the new Cicely Tyson School of Performing and Fine Arts was among the largest and most technologically advanced schools ever built in the state of New Jersey, with extensive performing arts facilities which meet or exceed the highest professional standards.

== Athletics ==
In 1896, East Orange was one of the founding member schools of the New Jersey Interscholastic Athletic Association, the state's first athletic conference; created and operated by students, the conference consisted of nine public and private high schools located across the state, competing in track and field, football and tennis.

Begun in 1897, East Orange had an annual Thanksgiving Day football rivalry with Barringer High School that had been the nation's longest-running continuous rivalry, played for 91 consecutive years until 2006, when scheduling conflicts interfered with the annual tradition; traditionally, the Left-Footed Kicker trophy is awarded to the winning team, with games attracting as many as 13,000 fans until the 1970s, when both teams saw their football programs deteriorate.

In March 1930, swimmer Gordon Chalmers won the title in the 100-yard backstroke at the national interscholastic aquatic champions at Columbia University, leading East Orange High School to a second-place team finish.

The boys' basketball team won the Group IV state championship in 1940 vs. West New York Memorial High School, in 1969 vs. Perth Amboy High School and in 1974 vs. Neptune High School, and won the Group III title in 1972 vs. Lakewood High School, in 1973 vs. Northern Burlington County Regional High School and 1976 vs. Woodrow Wilson High School. The girls' basketball team won the Group IV state championship in 1980 vs. Atlantic City High School. The 1968 team won the Group IV state title with a 74–56 victory against a Perth Amboy High School team led by future NBA player Brian Taylor.

== Notable alumni ==
- John Amos (1939–2024, class of 1958), actor who played James Evans Sr. on the 1970s television series Good Times
- Charlie Biot (1917–2000), outfielder who played in Negro league baseball from 1939 to 1941
- Robert Bowser (1935–2022, class of 1953), politician who served as mayor of East Orange from 1998 to 2014
- Betty Bronson (1906–1971), television and film actress who began her career during the silent film era after leaving school to benefit her film career
- Tyrone Brown (born 1942, class of 1960), attorney, Commissioner of the Federal Communications Commission
- Herbert Brucker (1898–1977), journalist, teacher, and national advocate for the freedom of the press, who served as editor-in-chief of the Hartford Courant
- Stephanie R. Bush (born 1953), attorney and politician who represented the 27th district in the New Jersey General Assembly from 1988 to 1992
- Robert L. Carter (1917–2012, class of 1933), lawyer, civil rights activist and a United States district judge
- Gordon Chalmers (1911–2000), swimmer who competed in the men's 100 metre backstroke at the 1932 Summer Olympics
- Margaret Clapp (1910–1974, class of 1926), scholar and educator, who served as eighth president of Wellesley College
- Freeman Craw (1917–2017), typeface designer
- Chris Fletcher (born 1948), safety who played for the San Diego Chargers during his seven-year NFL career
- Harold Geiger (1884–1927), US military aviator number 6, who was killed in an airplane crash in 1927
- Constance W. Hand (1895–1982), politician who served six terms in the New Jersey General Assembly
- Ann Harding (1902–1981), actress who was nominated for an Academy Award for the film Holiday
- Balozi Harvey (1940-2016, class of 1957). diplomat and community organizer
- Chris Jones (born 1964), American football center who played one season in the NFL with the New York Giants
- Leander Knight (born 1963), former American football defensive back who played for the Atlanta Falcons, New York Jets and Houston Oilers
- Naomi Long Madgett (1923–2020), poet
- Evelyn Groesbeeck Mitchell (1879–1964), entomologist and physician
- Teana Muldrow (born 1995, class of 2013), professional basketball player who has played in the WNBA for the Seattle Storm and Dallas Wings
- C. Milford Orben (1895–1975), politician who served five terms in the New Jersey General Assembly
- Eddie Rabbitt (1941–1998), country music singer-songwriter who dropped out to head to Nashville
- C. Thomas Schettino (1907–1983), Associate Justice of the New Jersey Supreme Court from 1959 to 1972
- George Tully (1904–1980), American football end who played one season in the NFL with the Frankford Yellow Jackets
- Dionne Warwick (born 1940, class of 1959), singer, actress and TV-show host, who became a United Nations Global Ambassador for the Food and Agriculture Organization
- Daryl White (born 1951), former professional football offensive guard who played for the Detroit Lions
