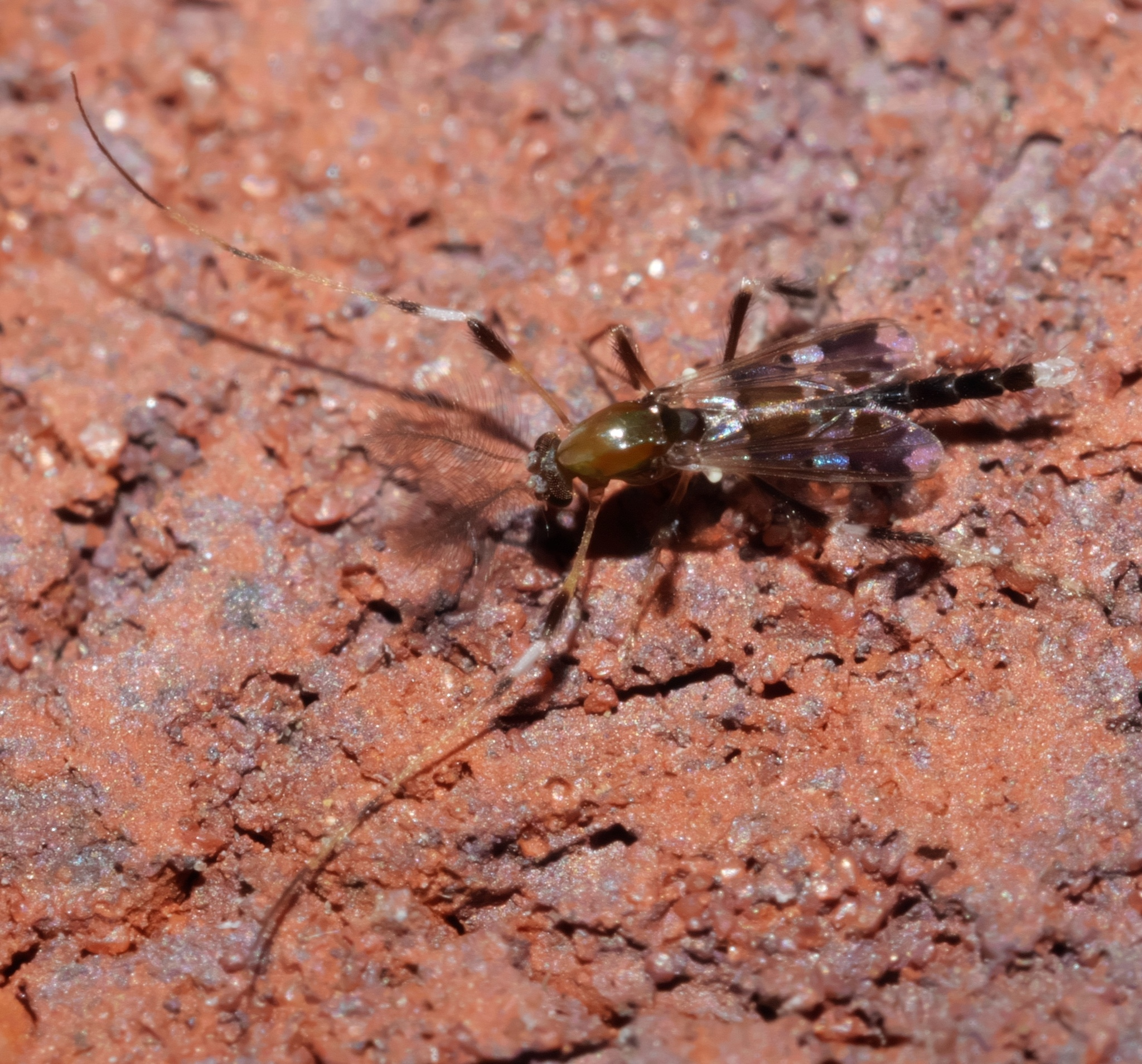
- Kribiodorum perpulchrum, Oklahoma

Scientific classification
- Kingdom: Animalia
- Phylum: Arthropoda
- Clade: Pancrustacea
- Class: Insecta
- Order: Diptera
- Family: Chironomidae
- Subfamily: Chironominae
- Tribe: Chironomini
- Genus: Kribiodorum
- Species: K. perpulchrum

Binomial name
- Kribiodorum perpulchrum (Mitchell, 1908)

Synonyms
- Chironomus perpulcher Mitchell, 1908; Stelechomyia perpulchra (Mitchell, 1908)

= Kribiodorum perpulchrum =

Species of non-biting midges

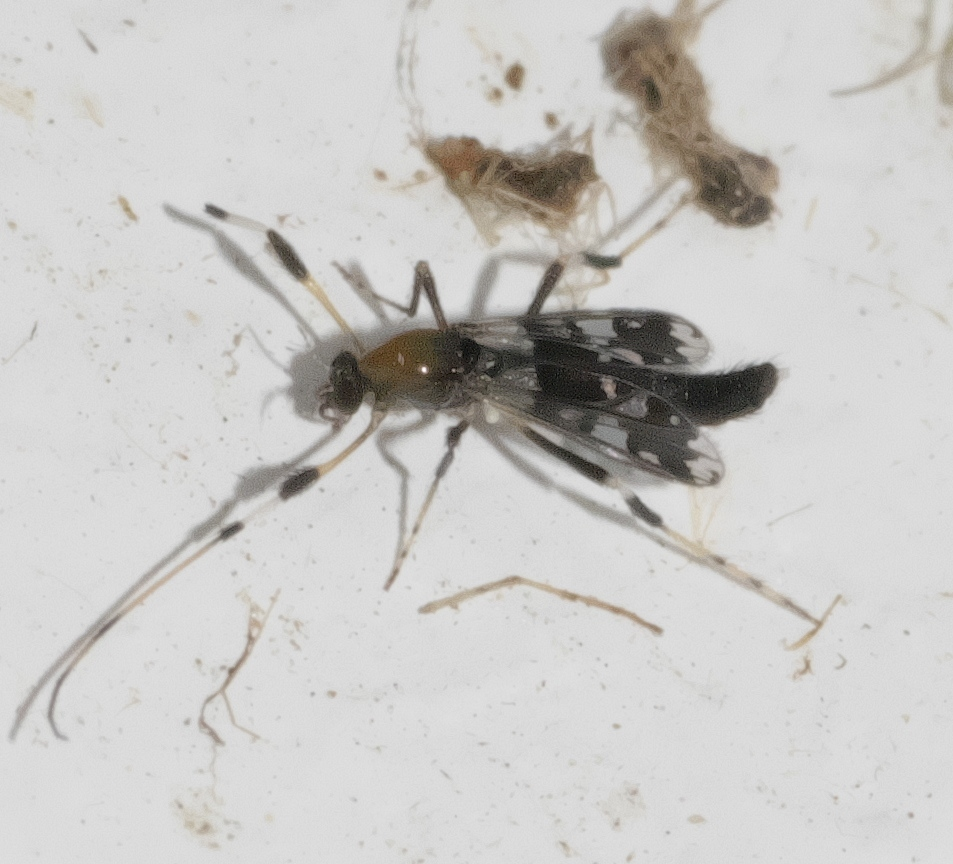
Kribiodorum perpulchrum, Oklahoma

Kribiodorum perpulchrum is a species of midge in the family Chironomidae. It is found in North America.
