= Tyrone Brown =

Tyrone Brown may refer to:

- Tyrone Brown (pardonee)
- Tyrone Brown (lawyer)
- Tyrone Brown (gridiron football)
