= East Orange Campus High School =

High school in Essex County, New Jersey, US

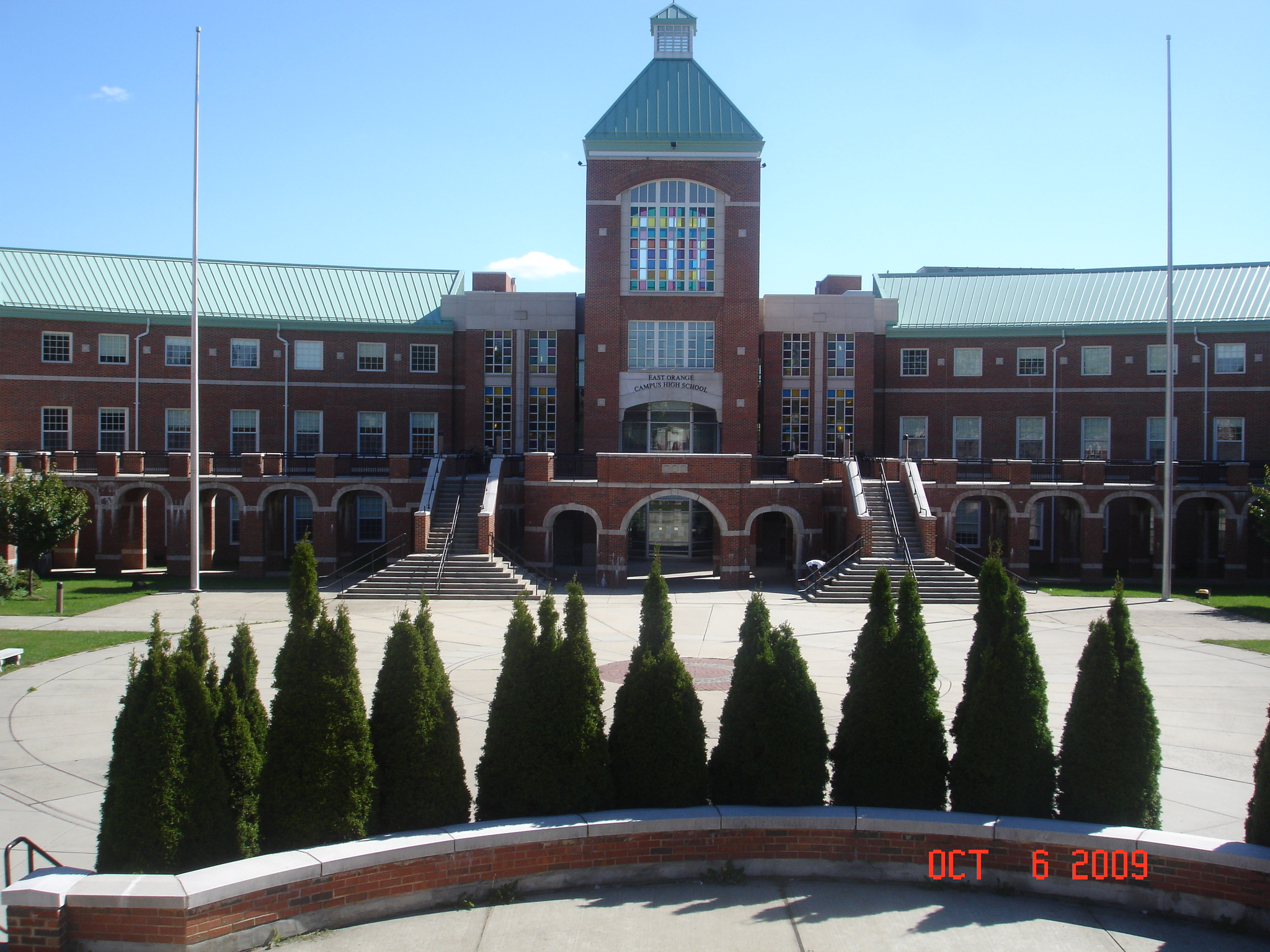

Location
- 344 Prospect Street; East Orange, Essex County, New Jersey 07017; United States
- 40.776064°N 74.208146°W

Information
- Type: Public high school
- Motto: "Rising to a Standard of Excellence"
- Established: 2002
- School district: East Orange School District
- NCES School ID: 340423000494
- Principal: Taniesha Whitaker
- Faculty: 101.0 FTEs
- Grades: 9-12
- Enrollment: 1,798 (as of 2024–25)
- Student to teacher ratio: 17.8:1
- Colors: Royal Blue; Red and Silver
- Athletics conference: Super Essex Conference (general); North Jersey Super Football Conference (football)
- Team name: Jaguars
- Rival: Barringer High School
- Accreditation: Middle States Association of Colleges and Schools
- Website: campus.eastorange.k12.nj.us

East Orange Campus High School is a comprehensive community public high school serving students in ninth through twelfth grades in the city of East Orange, in Essex County, in the U.S. state of New Jersey, on the former campus of Upsala College. The school is part of the East Orange School District, classified as an Abbott District. The school has been accredited by the Middle States Association of Colleges and Schools Commission on Elementary and Secondary Schools since 1928.

As of the 2024–25 school year, the school had an enrollment of 1,798 students and 101.0 classroom teachers (on an FTE basis), for a student–teacher ratio of 17.8:1. There were 139 students (7.7% of enrollment) eligible for free lunch and 14 (0.8% of students) eligible for reduced-cost lunch.

== History ==
East Orange Campus High School was opened in 2002, resulting from the merging of the former Clifford Scott High School and East Orange High School. The school is located in the largest building of the refurbished campus of Upsala College and has been expanded to accommodate increased demand for enrollment. As a result of the merger, students now have access to new and much improved educational facilities. The former Clifford Scott High School facility was home to East Orange Campus Nine High School, the home for all 9th grade high school students in East Orange. Announced in November 2010, East Orange Campus Nine was updated to become East Orange STEM Academy, which will serve students from 9-12th graders.

== Awards, recognition and rankings ==
The school was the 337th-ranked public high school in New Jersey out of 339 schools statewide in New Jersey Monthly magazine's September 2014 cover story on the state's "Top Public High Schools", using a new ranking methodology. The school had been ranked 318th in the state of 328 schools in 2012, after being ranked 292nd in 2010 out of 322 schools listed. The magazine ranked the school 263rd in 2008 out of 316 schools. The school was ranked 286th in the magazine's September 2006 issue, which surveyed 316 schools across the state.

== Athletics ==
The East Orange Campus High School Jaguars compete in the Super Essex Conference, which is comprised of public and private high schools in Essex County and was established following a reorganization of sports leagues in Northern New Jersey by the New Jersey State Interscholastic Athletic Association (NJSIAA). Prior to the NJSIAA's 2010 realignment, the school had participated in the Iron Hills Conference, an athletic conference which included high schools in Essex, Morris and Union counties. With 1,756 students in grades 10–12, the school was classified by the NJSIAA for the 2019–20 school year as Group IV for most athletic competition purposes, which included schools with an enrollment of 1,060 to 5,049 students in that grade range. The football team competes in the Liberty White division of the North Jersey Super Football Conference, which includes 112 schools competing in 20 divisions, making it the nation's biggest football-only high school sports league. The school was classified by the NJSIAA as Group V North for football for 2024–2026, which included schools with 1,317 to 5,409 students.

The boys swimming team as the public school state champion in 1930–1932.

The boys track team won the spring / outdoor track state championship in Group IV in 1937.

The boys' basketball team won the Group IV title in 1940 (against West New York Memorial High School in the finals), 1969 (vs. Perth Amboy High School) and 1974 (vs. Neptune High School), and won in Group III in 1972 (vs. Lakewood High School), 1973 (vs. Northern Burlington County Regional High School) and 1976 (vs. Woodrow Wilson High School). The 1940 team was down 23-12 at the half in the Group IV championship game and cut the deficit to a point by the end of the third period before winning the game on a list-minute basket that gave the team a 39-38 upset win against a West New York Memorial team that had come into the finals with a 24-game winning streak. With more than 13,000 spectators at Convention Hall in Atlantic City, the 1969 team defeated a Perth Amboy squad led by future NBA player Brian Taylor by a score of 74-56, winning the Group IV state title and finishing the season with a record of 26-2.

The track team was co-winner of the Group III indoor relay state championship in 1975 and the Group IV title in 2018.

The girls' basketball team won the Group IV state championship in 1980, defeating Atlantic City High School in the finals. The girls' basketball team won the 2003 North II, Group IV state sectional championship with a 74–55 win over Barringer High School.

In 2007, the football team won the North I, Group IV state sectional championship with a 31–13 win over Montclair High School, in a game played at Giants Stadium. The win was the team's first sectional title since the playoff era began in 1974. The school's football rivalry with Barringer High School, which dates back to a Thanksgiving Day game played in 1897, was listed at 7th on NJ.com's 2017 list "Ranking the 31 fiercest rivalries in N.J. HS football". East Orange leads the rivalry with a 63-39-9 overall record as of 2023.

== Administration ==
The school's principal is Taniesha Whitaker. Her core administration team includes four assistant principals.

== Notable alumni ==
Notable alumni of East Orange Campus High School (including graduates of Clifford Scott High School, whose histories have been claimed by East Orange Central) are:

- Rasul Douglas (born 1995), cornerback, National Football League.
- Chris Fletcher (born 1948), former American football cornerback
- Janis Ian (born 1951), singer-songwriter
- Kyle Louis (born 2004), American football linebacker for the Miami Dolphins
- Treach (born 1970), Vin Rock and DJ Kay Gee, members of rap group Naughty by Nature.
- Oliver deGray Vanderbilt (1884–1960), All-American basketball player for Princeton University in 1905
- Dionne Warwick (born 1940, class of 1958), singer

== Gallery ==
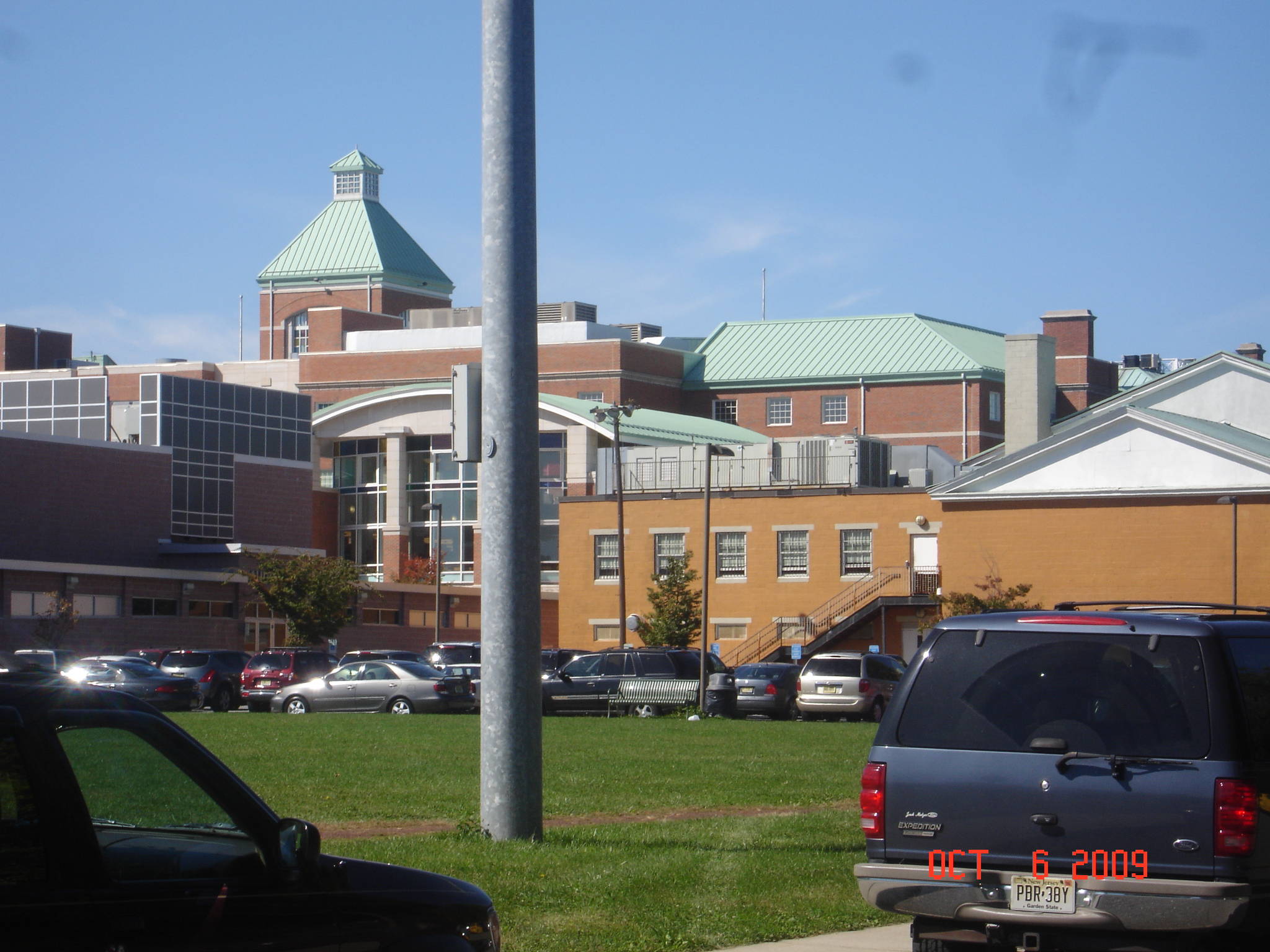
A look at the school from the back entrance.

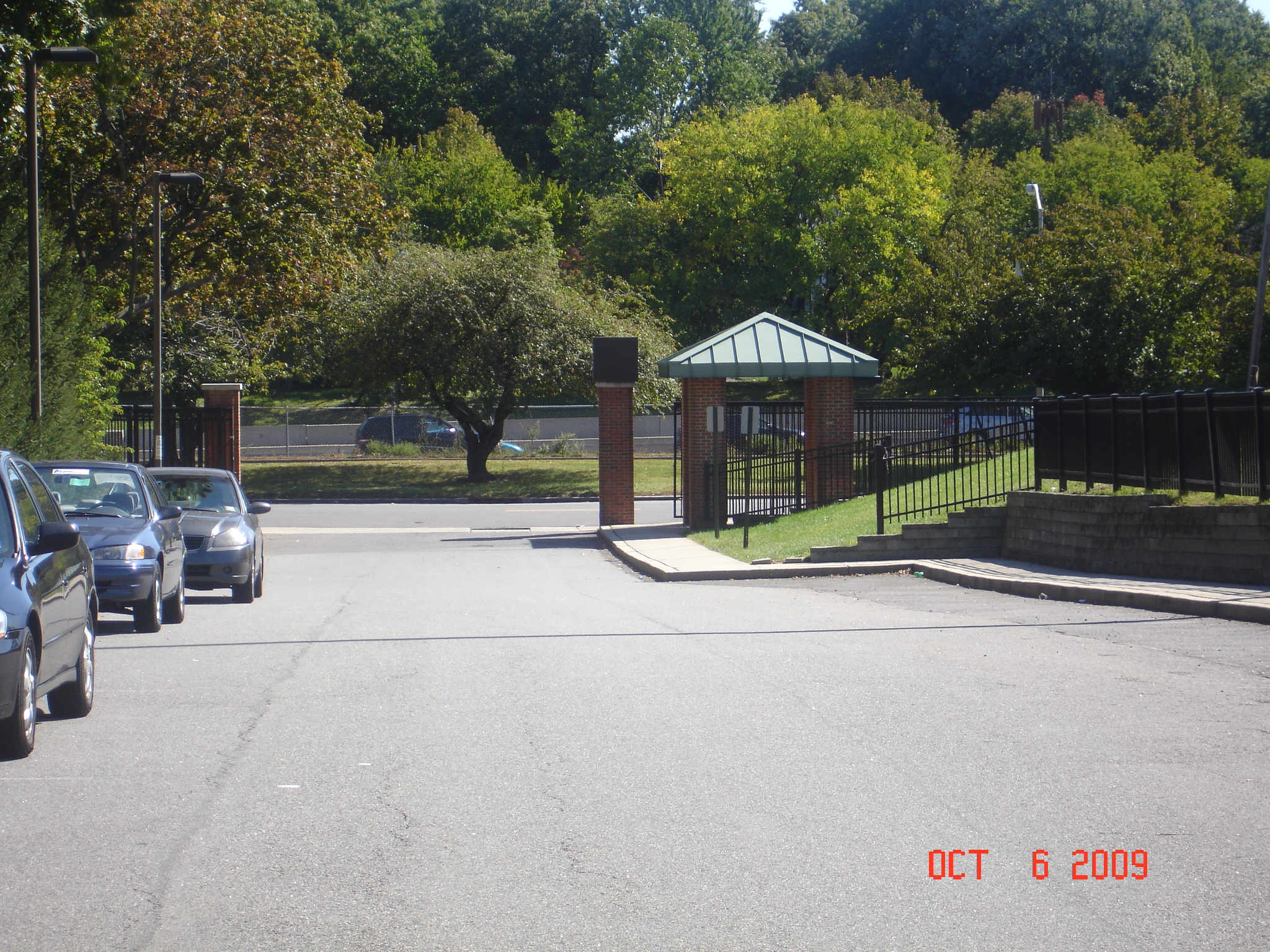
This is the actual entrance behind the school. An entrance to the Garden State Parkway is not far from there.

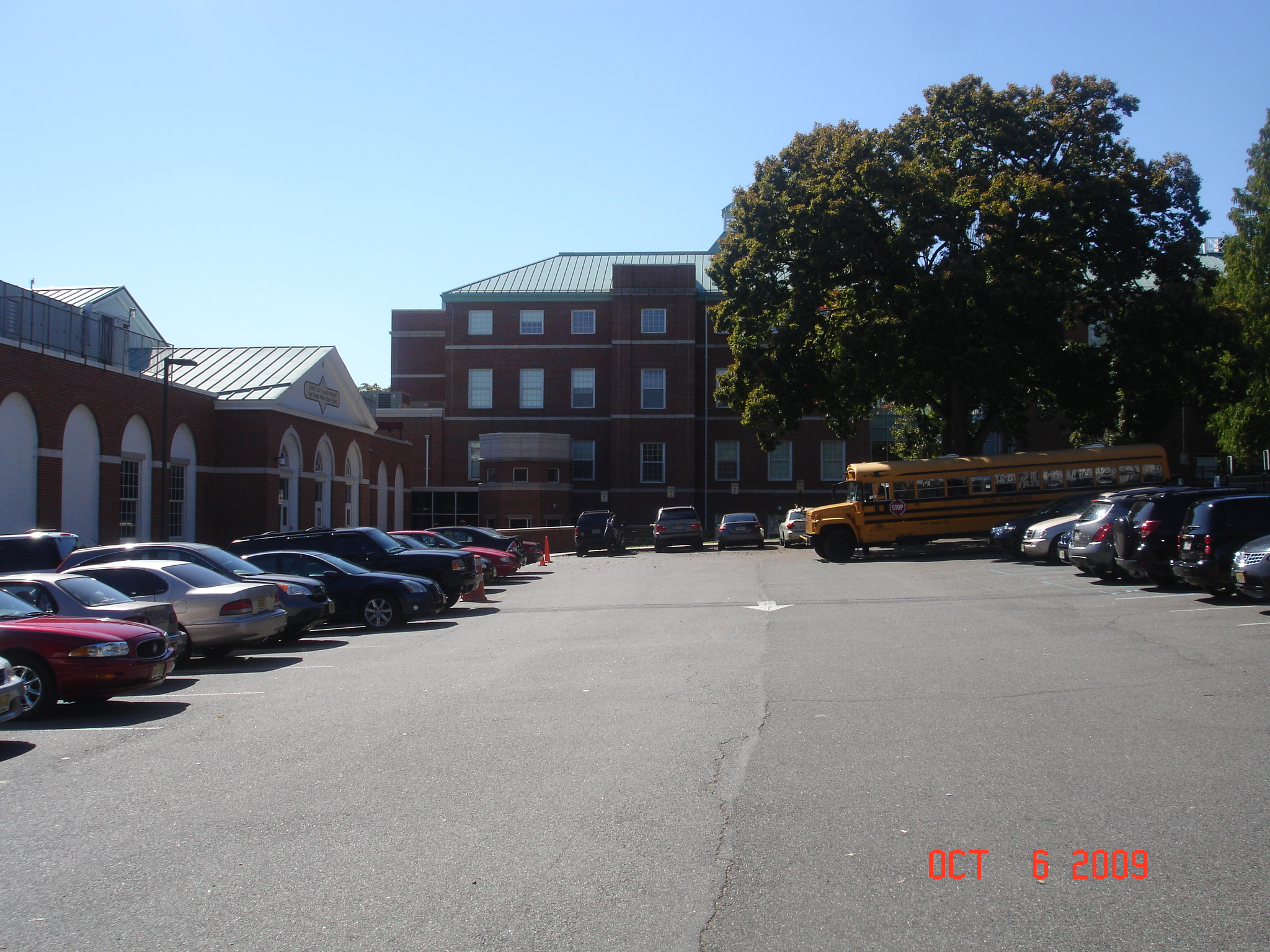
One of the many parking lots around the school.

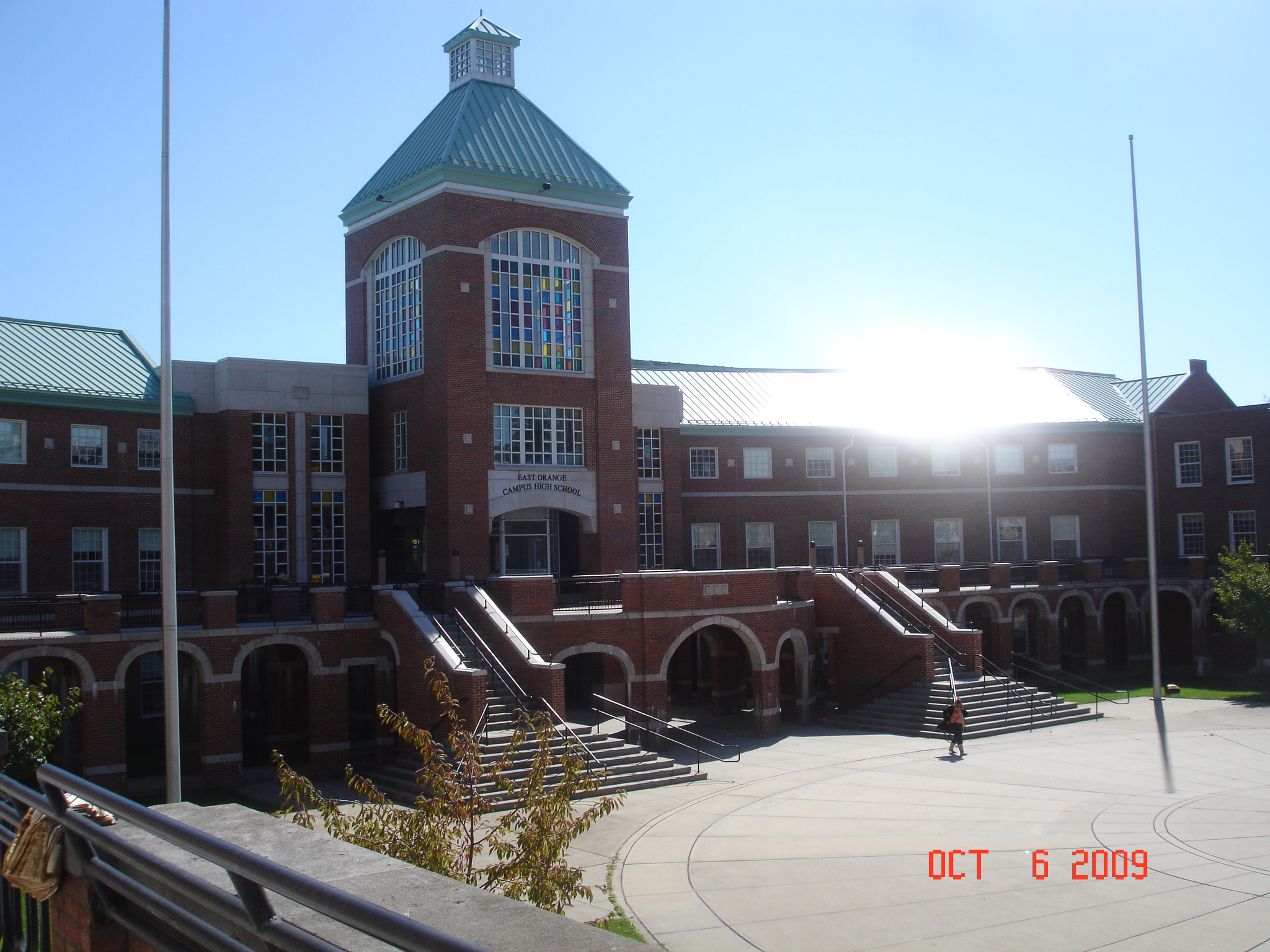
A different view of the bell tower and main courtyard.

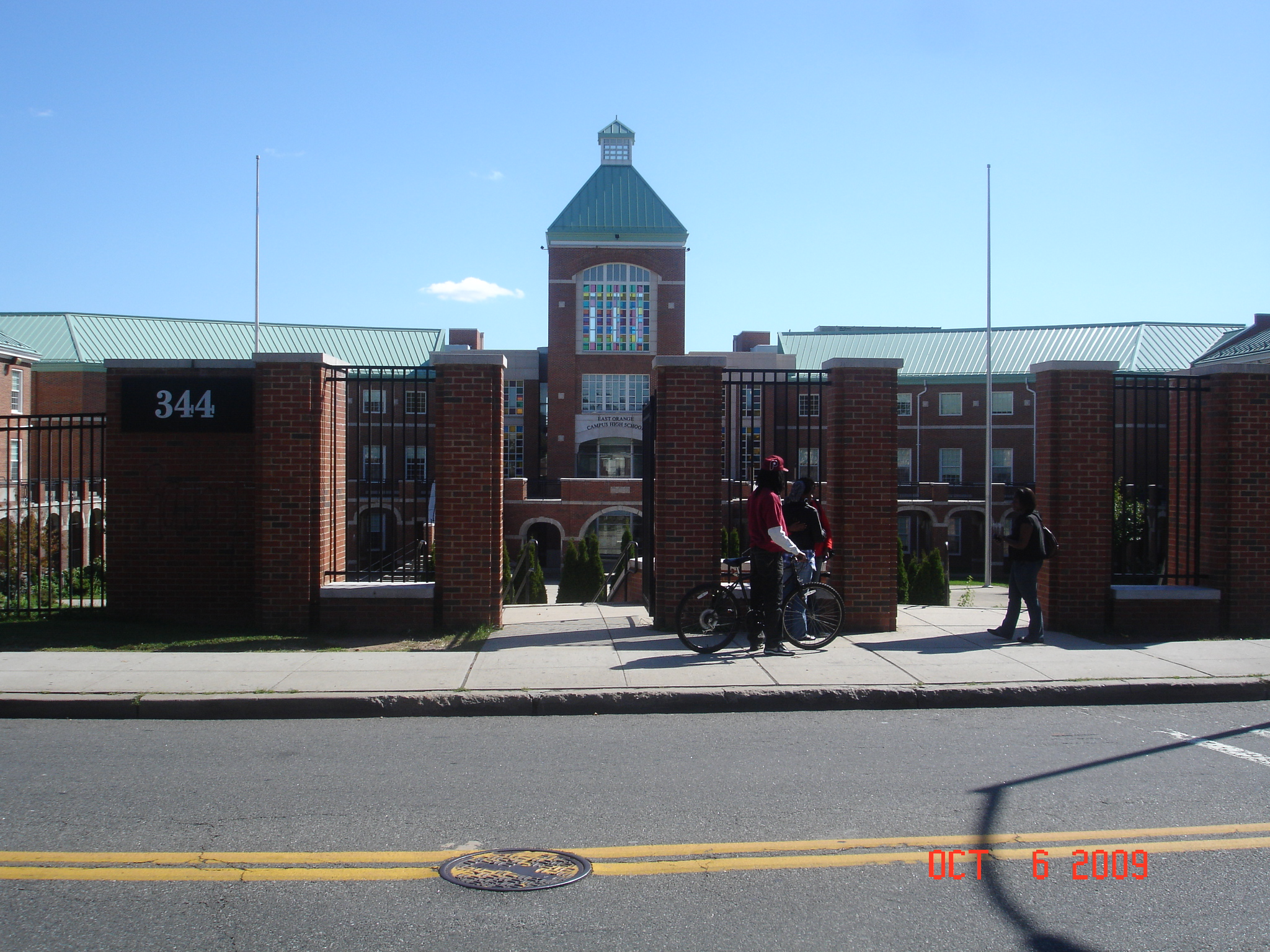
Another view of the main entrance.

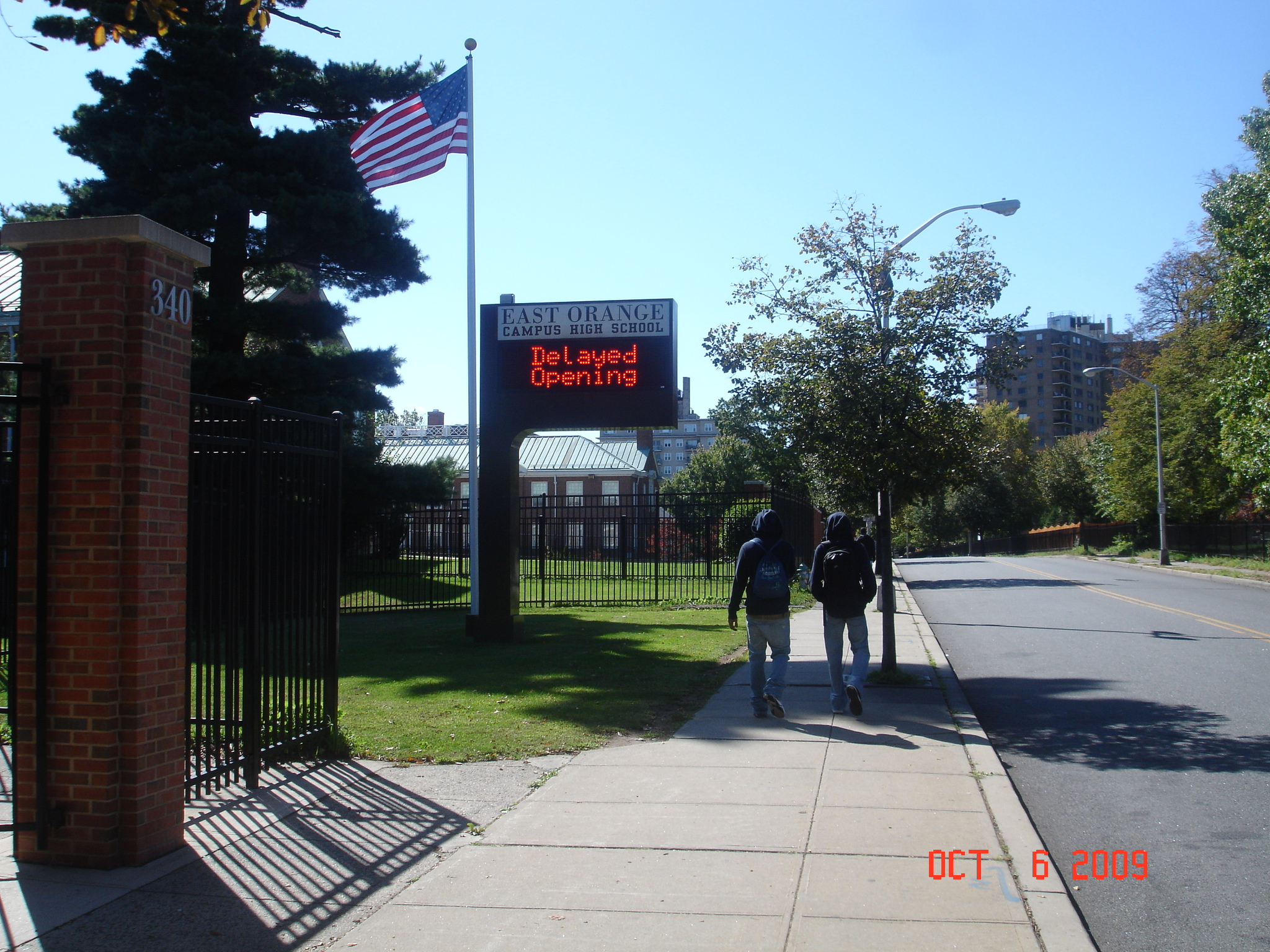
Electronic announcement board at East Orange Campus High.

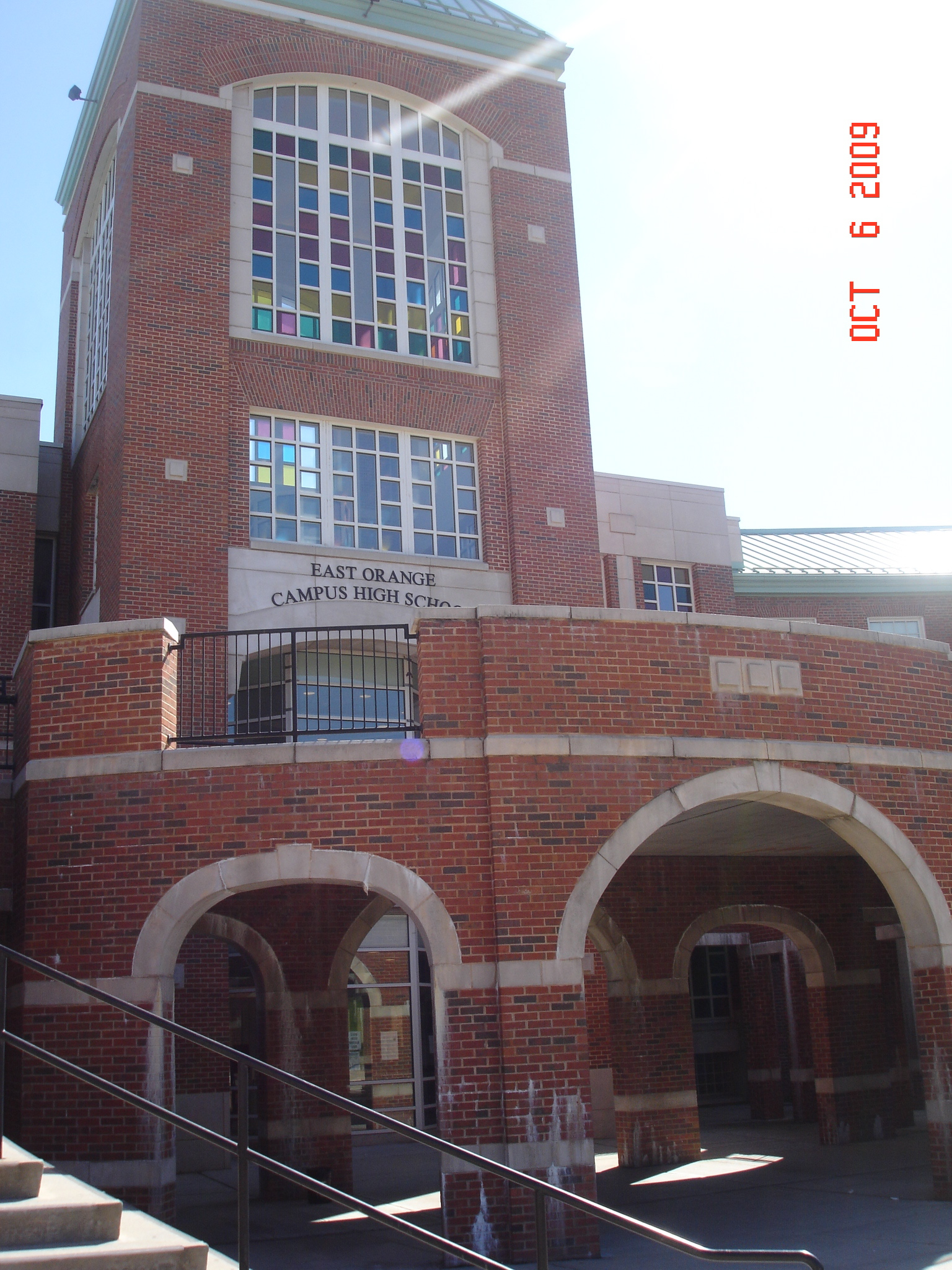
The tower, which is the main architectural feature and the most recognizable landmark of the school.

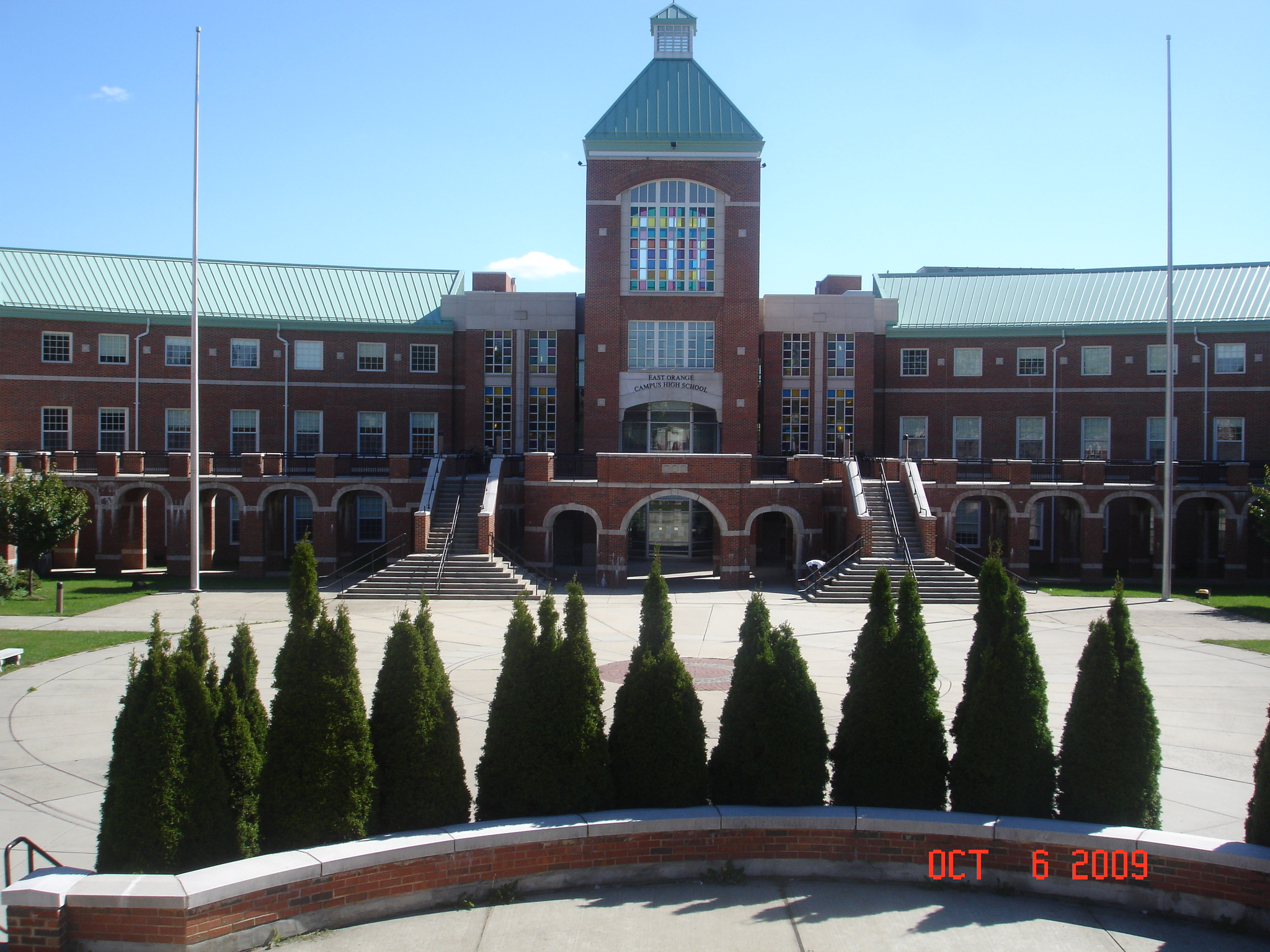
The main entrance to East Orange High School.
