= John J. Francis =

John J. Francis may refer to:

- J. J. Francis (1839–1901), counsel in the British Colony of Hong Kong
- John J. Francis (musician) (1945-2022), Australian musician
- John J. Francis (New Jersey judge) (1903–1984), American politician and jurist
