= Clifford Scott High School =

Defunct high school in New Jersey, US

Clifford J. Scott High School

Location
- 129 Renshaw Avenue; East Orange, Essex County, New Jersey 07017; United States
- 40.77687°N 74.20337°W

Information
- Type: Public high school
- Established: 1937
- Closed: 2002
- School district: East Orange School District
- Grades: 9–12

Clifford J. Scott High School was a comprehensive community public high school serving students in ninth through twelfth grades in the city of East Orange, in Essex County, in the U.S. state of New Jersey, operated as part of the East Orange School District from 1937 until 2002.

== History ==
The school was named for Dr. Clifford John Scott, who was appointed in 1921 as the district's superintendent and served until his death in 1936. Scott initiated a program of junior high schools in the district and a combined junior/senior high school was named for him when it was established in 1937.

East Orange Campus High School was opened in 2002, resulting from the merging of the former Clifford Scott High School and East Orange High School, located in the largest building of the refurbished campus of Upsala College and has been expanded to accommodate increased demand for enrollment. As a result of the merger, students gained access to new and much improved educational facilities. The former Clifford Scott High School facility was home to East Orange Campus Nine High School, the home for all ninth grade high school students in East Orange. Announced in November 2010, East Orange Campus Nine was updated to become East Orange STEM Academy, which is a magnet school for grades 6–12.

== Athletics ==
The boys' track team won the Group II spring / outdoor track state championship in 1946, 1962, 1979 and 1980.

The baseball team won the North II Group II state sectional championships in 1959, 1966 and 1967, and won the Group II state championship in 1973, defeating Audubon High School in the final game of the tournament. The 1973 team finished the season with a record of 18–6 after defeating a depleted Audubon team in the Group II title by a score of 7–3 in the championship game.

The boys' track team won the Group II indoor relay championship in 1979 and 1980. The girls' team won the Group III title in 1988 and 1989 (as co-champion)

The girls' basketball team won state championships in all four finals appearances, winning the Group II state championship in 1982 vs. St. Rose High School and 1983 vs. Somerville High School, and won the Group III title in 1984 with a win against North Hunterdon High School in the tournament final and in 1991 against Egg Harbor Township High School. The 1983 team repeated as Group II state champion after defeating Somerville by a score of 56–40 in the championship game played at the Meadowlands Arena.

The boys' basketball team won titles in five of their seven appearances, winning the Group II championships in 1958 (against runner-up Highland Park High School in the finals), 1981 (vs. Salem High School) and 1982 (vs. Salem), won the Group I title in 1975 against Glassboro High School, and won the Group III title in 1991 (vs. Woodrow Wilson High School). The 1991 team won the Group III title with a 68–62 win against Woodrow Wilson.

== Notable alumni ==
- Richie Adubato (1937–2025), basketball coach in the National Basketball Association and the Women's National Basketball Association
- Marques Bragg (born 1970), retired professional basketball player who played in the NBA with the Minnesota Timberwolves in the 1995–96 season.
- Mike Brown (born 1963), former basketball player who played for 11 seasons in the NBA with the Chicago Bulls, Utah Jazz, Minnesota Timberwolves, Philadelphia 76ers and the Phoenix Suns.
- Willis Edwards (born 1970), politician who represented the 34th Legislative District in the New Jersey General Assembly from 2002 to 2004
- Gary Garland (born 1957), former professional basketball player who played for the Denver Nuggets in the National Basketball Association in the 1979–80 season.
- Fred Hill Sr. (born 1934), former head baseball coach at Rutgers University in New Brunswick, where he served from 1984 through 2013.
- Chickie Geraci Poisson (born 1931), former field hockey player and coach.

== Notable faculty ==
- Brian Hill (born 1947), basketball coach who began his coaching career with two years as head coach at Clifford Scott High School starting in 1970.
