= Ad Lib (typeface) =

Display typeface

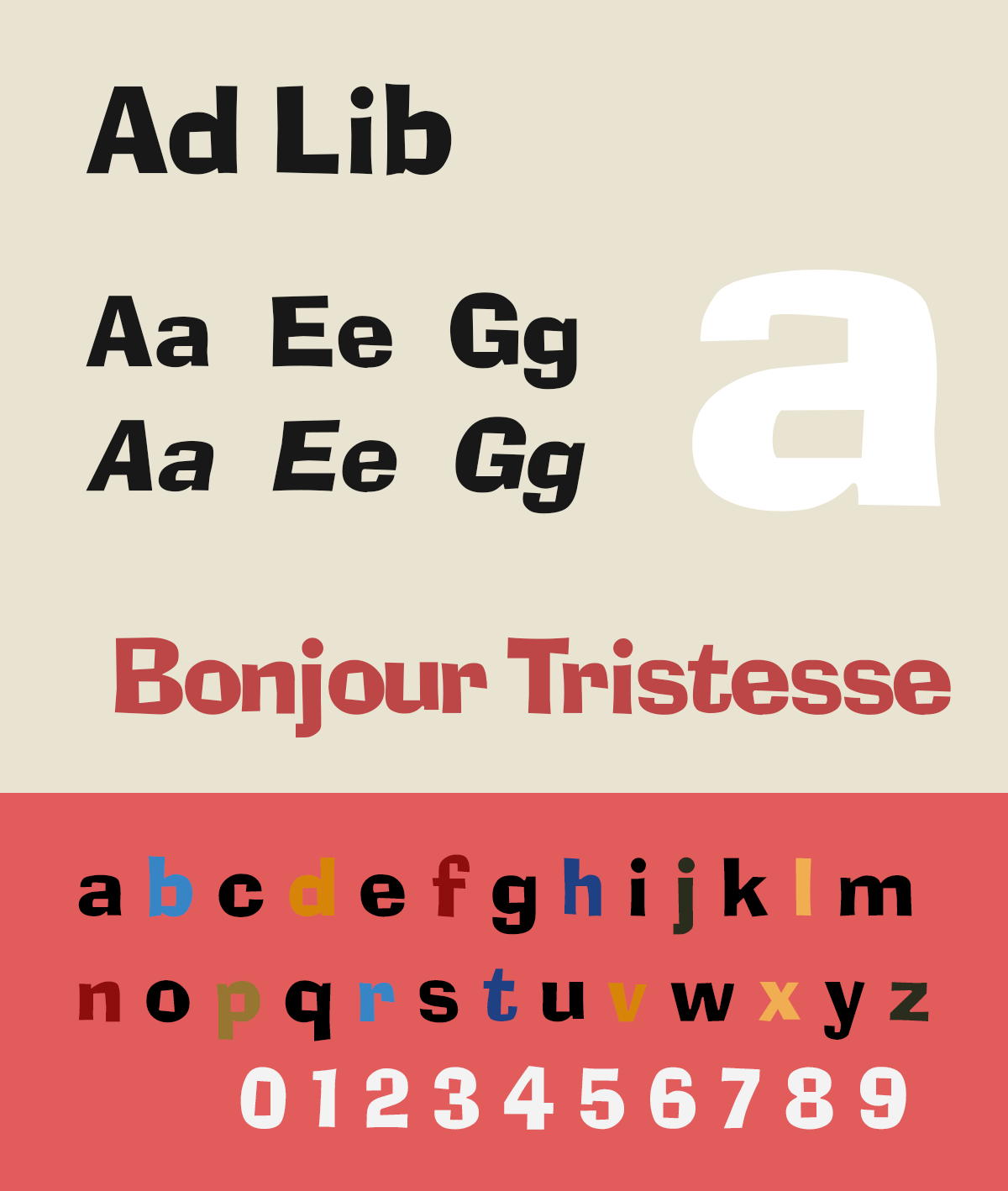
- Category: Display
- Designer: Freeman Craw
- Foundry: ATF
- Date released: 1961
- Re-issuing foundries: Bitstream Inc.
- Design based on: the work of title designer and calligrapher Harold Adler

Ad Lib is a display typeface designed in 1961 by Freeman Craw for American Type Founders. The typeface was allegedly inspired by Harold Adler's design for the 1958 film Bonjour Tristesse. Filmotype also designed a narrow variant, Filmotype Pioneer and a wider variant, Filmotype Moose.

Originally released with two variants for many characters, the digital versions seen today offer only one variant.
