= Iqua Colson =

American musical artist

- Born: Kristine Browne; July 12, 1953 (age 73); Chicago, Illinois
- Genres: Jazz
- Occupations: Singer, Composer, Lyricist, Educator
- Instruments: Voice, Piano
- Years active: 1970s-present
- Labels: Delmark Records, Silver Sphinx
- Website: colsonsmusic.com

Iqua Colson, born Kristine Browne (12 July 1953) in Chicago, Illinois, USA, is an American vocalist, composer, lyricist, arts administrator, and educator.

== Early life ==
At the age of 19, an African friend of the singer remarked, "You are Iqua", the name given to female singers in his village. Iqua adopted the name which she has continued to use. Colson studied piano from an early age. At Kenwood High School her teacher was composer Lena McLin, the niece and student of Thomas Dorsey. She attended Northwestern University School of Music and later transferred to Chicago Musical College at Roosevelt University where she completed her undergraduate music degree.

In 1975, she married pianist Adegoke Steve Colson, and in 1982 they moved to Montclair, New Jersey.

== Career ==
=== Music ===
Iqua Colson became an early member of the Association for Advancement of Creative Musicians (AACM) in 1972. In the Downbeat AACM 50th Anniversary issue, vocalist/composer Colson is described as one of the 'ACCM's Powerful Women', along with Peggy Abrams, Sandra Lashley, pianist-composer-singer Amina Claudine Myers, flutist Nicole Mitchell, cellist Tomeka Reid, pianist-singer Ann Ward, vocalists Dee Alexander, singer-harpist-flutist Sonjia Hubert Harper (aka Maia). She was named a Vocal Talent Deserving Wider Recognition by DownBeat and recognized by Billboard for distinguished achievement as a lyricist. Fred Anderson put together the Fred Anderson Sextet including Colson as vocalist, reedist Douglas Ewart, trombonist George Lewis, bassist Felix Blackmon, pianist Soji Adebayo and drummer Hamid Drake. One of the most active women musicians and vocalists within the early AACM, Colson is referenced as an inspiration by other vocalists like Dee Alexander. She has led bands at women’s jazz festivals, and performs in collaboration with her husband Adegoke Steve Colson with his Steve Colson Quartet, their Colsons Unity Troupe, among other musical collaborations for the AACM and other arts organizations. She served as a member of the board of directors of The Jazz Institute of Chicago, helping to expand audience for the annual Chicago Jazz Festival, and was a founding member of FEPA, producers of Chicago's Underground Fest and Blacklight Film Festival.

Listed as a singer who crosses musical boundaries like Abbey Lincoln, Rita Warford, Linda Sharrock, Phil Minton, among others, Colson remains an active member of the AACM and is recognized as an important part of the legacy of the AACM

=== Arts Education ===
Iqua Colson became a music team leader in East Orange, New Jersey's Washington Academy of Music at the school's inception in 1994. She then became the coordinator of arts programs for the East Orange School District, focusing on curriculum development and special projects in the arts. Colson also worked in the initial phases of the Whitney E. Houston Academy of Creative and Performing Arts and the Cicely L. Tyson Community School of Performing and Fine Arts in East Orange. Along with founding principal Mrs. Laura Trimmings, Iqua Colson worked closely with Ms Cicely Tyson to design the Cicely L. Tyson Community School of Performing and Fine Arts campus, which opened in 2009. Colson is a member of New Jersey's Core Curriculum Content Committee for the Arts and served on the board of directors of the Newark Arts Council and the Montclair Arts Council. She has a Masters of Public Administration/Arts Administration degree from Seton Hall University and is a consultant on the arts as a catalyst for educational and/or social change, including neighborhood planning, arts venue design and arts curricula.

== Discography with Adegoke Steve Colson ==
- Triumph! Silver Sphinx SS01
- No Reservation Black Saint BSR 0043
- Hope for Love Silver Sphinx SS12402
- Untarnished Dream Silver Sphinx SS12403
- Freedom Rhythm & Sound – Revolutionary Jazz and The Civil Rights Movement Soul Jazz Records SUR CD 219
- Triumph! (re-issue from Soul Jazz / London) Universal Sound US CD40
