= New Jersey Interscholastic Athletic Association =

High-school conference in the U.S. state of New Jersey

The New Jersey Interscholastic Athletic Association (NJIAA), formed in 1896, was the first high-school conference in the U.S. state of New Jersey, and was student-initiated and run. As with most student-run leagues, the students formed an alliance with adult organizations to provide facilities and officials, notably the New Jersey Athletic Club for their track and field meet. The league took in both public and private schools; its public-school members being Newark Central High School, Montclair High School, Plainfield High School and East Orange High School; its private-school members being Newark Academy, Bordentown Military Institute, Stevens Preparatory, Pingry School, and Montclair Military Academy. The league began with a track and field contest in 1896, and then expanded with football and tennis competition. The New Jersey Interscholastic Athletic Association split into separate private and public conferences after the turn of the 20th century.
