= Cicely L. Tyson Community School of Performing and Fine Arts =

High school in Passaic County, New Jersey, US

Location
- 35 Winans Street; East Orange, Essex County, New Jersey 07017; United States
- Coordinates: 40.7536°N 74.2210°W

Information
- Type: Magnet middle school / high school
- Motto: We Aim High, We Soar High
- School district: East Orange School District
- NCES School ID: 340423002064
- Principal: John English
- Faculty: 62.0 FTEs
- Grades: 6-12
- Enrollment: 701 (as of 2024–25)
- Student to teacher ratio: 11.3:1
- Website: tysonmiddlehigh.eastorange.k12.nj.us

Cicely L. Tyson Community School of Performing and Fine Arts is a specialty magnet public middle school / high school that serves students in sixth through twelfth grades in the city of East Orange in Essex County, in the U.S. state of New Jersey, as part of the East Orange School District, offering separate middle school and high school curricula. The school is named for actress Cicely Tyson. Students are accepted based on all their talents. The school teaches core disciplines while focusing on the creative potential of the students.

As of the 2024–25 school year, the school had an enrollment of 701 students and 62.0 classroom teachers (on an FTE basis), for a student–teacher ratio of 11.3:1. There were 71 students (10.1% of enrollment) eligible for free lunch and 17 (2.4% of students) eligible for reduced-cost lunch.

The school district, in partnership with the City of East Orange applied for and received a Demonstration Project Grant to build a new school. Between 2006 and 2009, Tyson Principal Laura Trimmings, Washington Academy of Music Principal Brenda Veale, Mayor Robert Bowser and District Arts Coordinator Iqua Colson worked with Cicely Tyson on the design and curriculum for the project. In September 2009, Tyson's historic Elmwood Avenue building (formerly known as Vernon L. Davey Junior High) closed, and a new $180 million, 300,000-square-foot (28,000 m^{2}) facility on Walnut Street (on the site of the former East Orange High School) took its place. The new facility, the Cicely L. Tyson Community School of Performing and Fine Arts, is among the largest and most technologically advanced schools ever built in the state of New Jersey, with extensive performing arts facilities which meet or exceed the highest professional standards. The school sits on a campus which consists of an elementary school and middle/high school.

The school's 800-seat theater has been built to Broadway standards in terms of sound, lighting and acoustics. In addition to the school's theaters, students have access to a TV studio, art studios, music rooms, individual performance practice rooms, animation rooms and shops to build and design stage sets. The classrooms all feature smartboards, advanced integrated audio-visual systems, and multiple computer workstations.

== Awards, recognition and rankings ==
The school was the 247th-ranked public high school in New Jersey out of 339 schools statewide in New Jersey Monthly magazine's September 2014 cover story on the state's "Top Public High Schools", using a new ranking methodology. The school had been ranked 233rd in the state of 328 schools in 2012, after being ranked 221st in 2010 out of 322 schools listed. The magazine ranked the school 208 out of 316 schools. The school was ranked 255th in the magazine's September 2006 issue, which surveyed 316 schools across the state. 2009 reports published in The Star-Ledger showed Tyson to be the most improved school in an Abbott District, and among the most improved schools in the state of New Jersey, that year.

== Administration ==
The school's Principal is John English. His core administration team includes two assistant principals.

The District Supervisor of Visual and Performing Arts is Iqua Colson.

== Notable alumni ==
- Luxx Noir London (born 1999), drag performer, singer and songwriter most known for competing on the fifteenth season of RuPaul's Drag Race.
