= Balozi Harvey =

American diplomat, activist and executive director

Honorable Balozi R.M.Z. Harvey
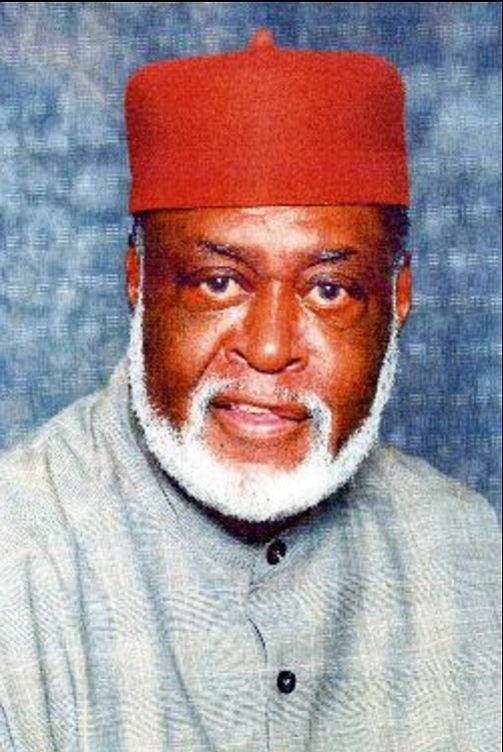
- Balozi R.M.Z. Harvey

Executive Director of Essex County Economic Development and Affirmative Action
- In office 1967–2016

Personal details
- Born: Robert Alexander Harvey; January 26, 1940 East Orange, New Jersey, U.S.
- Died: December 28, 2016 (aged 76) East Hanover, New Jersey, U.S.
- Spouse: Karimu F. Hill Harvey (m. 1979–2016)
- Children: Angela Harvey; Karen Harvey; Zayd Harvey Jenkins; Quami Harvey Cook; Nurisha A. Harvey; Mwalimu S. Harvey
- Parents: Clifton Harvey; Willie Belle Harvey
- Relatives: Nazareth Harvey Nonez (sister); Josephine Harvey Lee (sister)
- Education: I East Orange High School I Seton Hall University (BA) I United Nations International School
- Occupation: Activist; Diplomat

Robert Zayd Muhammad "Balozi" Harvey (January 26, 1940 – December 28, 2016) was an American activist, community organizer, diplomat, and public official based in New Jersey and New York. He played a prominent role in Black political organizing, Pan-African diplomacy, and cultural exchange between African nations and African-American communities from the 1960s onward.

Harvey was given the title "Balozi", Swahili for ambassador or statesman, by Julius K. Nyerere, the first president of Tanzania in 1964.

Over the course of his career, he worked with international governments, the United Nations, local and county administrations, and later served in senior economic development and cultural affairs roles in Essex County, New Jersey.

== Early life ==
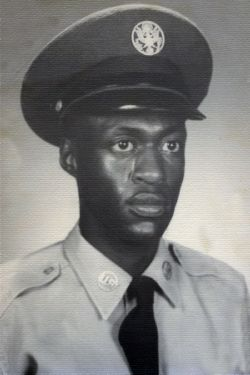
Harvey, in his United States Air Force uniform.

Harvey was born in East Orange, New Jersey, on January 26, 1940, to parents Clifton Harvey and Willie Bell Harvey. He was raised Catholic. His father was a cook for Marcus Garvey, an activist in the Pan-African Movement. He graduated from East Orange High School in 1957 and enlisted in the United States Air Force. He served with the Strategic Air Command for four years before being discharged in 1961.

Harvey graduated from Seton Hall University, where he majored in political science. He, then, attended the United Nations International School, in New York, where he learned Swahili, Mandarin Chinese, Arabic, and Zulu.

In 1965, Harvey converted from Christianity to Islam and joined the Nation of Islam. He later became an advocate for the holiday Kwanzaa. He married Karimu F. Hill in 1979, a judge of the Municipal Court of East Orange. From 1982 until his death, Harvey resided in South Orange, New Jersey. He had six children and five grandchildren.

== Activism and Diplomacy ==
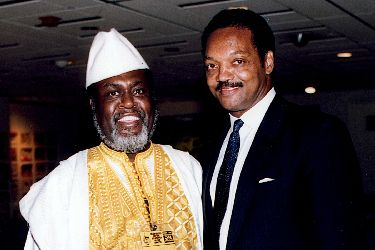
Balozi Harvey standing with activist and politician Jesse Jackson.

=== Black Movement ===
In 1961, the same year he was discharged, Harvey became involved with the Black Power Movement. He helped other people of African descent to "locate their blackness, through feelings of exile, against the backdrop of post-colonial Africa". In 1964, Harvey returned to Africa, as a guest of Julius K. "Mwalimu" Nyerere, the first president of Tanzania. Nyerere referred to him as Balozi (Swahili for ambassador or statesman).

In 1966, eighteen months after his return to the United States, he served as a job recruiter for Tanzania. In 1967, Balozi founded and became Chairman of the Black Community Development Organization. In 1967, Balozi attended the inaugural Kwanzaa celebration, launched by Malanga Karenga, in Los Angeles, California. He then participated in a 1968 rally against the proposed construction of Route 75, an eight-lane highway planned to run from north to south. He thought that it would cut the Central Ward in half, displacing thousands of black and Puerto Rican residents.

As part of the Peace and Power campaign, Balozi Harvey, Amiri Baraka, and Mfundishi Maasi composed a triumvirate of political leaders within the Committee for a United Newark (CFUN). In 1970, their campaign efforts contributed to the election of Kenneth A. Gibson, the first black mayor of Newark. Harvey continued his work, through the Newark mayor's office, as a special aide in the Office of Honorary Kenneth A. Gibson, where he handled international relations and protocol. In 1969, due to conflicts from Baraka's push for centralizing CFUN and prioritizing political education, the Black Community Development Organization and other groups, such as the Sisters of Black Culture, departed CFUN.

=== Roles and Partnerships ===
Starting in 1970, Harvey operated as a Non-Governmental Organization (NGO) representative to the United Nations, for the Congress of Afrikan People (CAP). He was in charge of CAP's international affairs and led the East Orange branch of CAP. While at the United Nations, Balozi served as Impresario for Ballet Africana, the national troupe of Guinea, at the request of the Guinean government. In October 1974, after Baraka pushed for CAP to embrace Maoism as its core ideology, Balozi resigned from CAP.

In 1982, Harvey was appointed executive director of the Harlem Third World Trade Institute (HTWTI), at the recommendation of US Congressman Charles B. Rangel. HTWTI is responsible for hosting and partnering with government officials and business leaders, and also acts as the international trade and investment promotion agency for the Harlem Urban Development Corporation (HUDC). He also acted as an investment consultant to HUDC, in New York City. That same year, he also served as a consultant to the Black Caucus of Local Elected Officials. During his 13 years as executive director, HTWTI facilitated over $30 million of international transactions. In addition, 47 heads of state and government and 400 high-level government and business leaders visited Harlem as guests. During the event, HTWTI promoted the proposal of the $150 million Harlem International Trade Center.

In 1983, the United Nations African and Caribbean Diplomatic Corps, under the joint chairmanship of Ambassador Oumarou G. Youssoufou, Executive Secretary of the Organization of African Unity to the United Nations, and Ambassador Serge Charles, of Haiti, honored Harvey at a testimonial dinner. The next year, he formed and became chairman of the Essex County Pan-African Cultural Society. He was also elected to the Board of Directors of the New York City Partnership, Inc. The partnership was headed by David Rockefeller, Chairman of Chase Manhattan Bank.

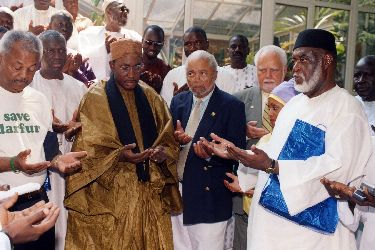
From right to left, in foreground: Harvey; former East Orange Mayor Robert Bowser; former New Jersey Representative William D. Payne; Mourid spiritual leader Cheikh Mame Mor M'Backe; and former United States Representative Donald M. Payne.

Harvey worked with several foreign dignitaries. He was installed as King Nana Kablam I, of the village of Azzuretti, in the Ivory Coast, and once described it as "...perhaps, the greatest highlight of my life". He was appointed Special Presidential Envoy of the Government of Liberia, by the President of the Republic of Liberia, H.E. Charles G. Taylor. He was honored at the Rites of Passage ceremony, held at the Alexandria Balloon Festival in Pittstown, in August 1994. The event was attended by twenty-five Chiefs, from Africa, and their respected Queens.

Between 2001 and 2002, Harvey served as Executive Vice President of Egg Solution, Inc., a European, optical, technology manufacturer with offices in Paris, New York City, and Los Angeles. A resident of Essex County, he was appointed Director of the Office of Cultural Diversity and Affirmative Action, in 2003. Through this post, he served as a member of the Essex County Disparity Study Commission and the Essex County Juvenile Justice Disparities Working Group. In 2004, he was appointed as executive director of the Essex County Economic Development Corporation and Essex County Office of Cultural Diversity and Affirmative Action, serving in those roles until 2007. A year later, in January 2005, he was appointed as executive director of the Essex County Economic Development Corporation (EDC), by county executive Joseph N. Di Vincenzo Jr.

== Later Years ==
In May 2006, Harvey was honored, as the Grand Marshall of the 40th Annual African-American Heritage New Jersey State-Wide Parade. Harvey retired from his diplomatic career, in September 2007.

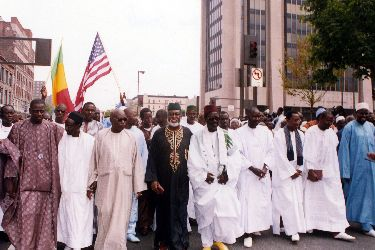
Photo taken of the Mourid International Community Annual Parade, held on Cheikh Ahmadou Bamba Day, in Harlem. Balozi walks, at the front of the parade, dressed in black.

Harvey gave opening remarks, at the 20th Cheikh Ahmadou Bamba Annual Day, at the United Nations Headquarters, on July 28, 2008. At the event, he encouraged everyone to celebrate Ahmadou Bamba, by wearing traditional African clothing. He began wearing African clothing, in 1987, in homage to his friend President Sankara, of Burkina Faso, who was assassinated that same year. He emphasized that those within the African Diaspora wear black and green, to distinguish themselves from their African brothers who dressed in white.

Harvey was a member of the Essex County Workforce Investment Board (WIB) and served as the County Executive's Municipal Liaison to the Township of Irvington, New Jersey. On April 26, 2016, the NAACP Chapter of the Oranges and Maplewood awarded him with its Presidential Award, during their Freedom Fund brunch.

== Religion and Spirituality ==
In 1965, Harvey converted to Islam, from Catholicism, while working with President Julius Nyerere of Tanzania. He took Zayd Muhammad, as his Muslim name.

He was named the North American Representative and Spokesman for Cheikh Moutada M'Backe, the spiritual leader of the Mourid Islamic Community, headquartered in Touba, Senegal. Harvey served as President of the Mourid Islamic Community in America (MICA). In this role, his primary responsibility was to assist Murid officials in making administrative decisions. At the time, he was, reportedly, the only American to head a predominantly African Sufi organization. In 1988, Harvey was responsible for financing Sheikh Mourtalla's first visit to the United States.

In 1990, the Hijrah Project was established, to construct an educational institute in Touba. As part of his N'Digel (protocols of governance), Sheikh Mourtada M'Backe produced a document that authorized Balozi to organize a celebration of Khadimou Rassoul. The document stated that all talibes, both American and Senegalese, were expected to follow Harvey's guidance. In 1996, Harvey was included among a delegation from the World Islamic Peoples' Leadership, for a proposed meeting with UN Secretary-General Boutros Boutros-Ghali, to discuss recent American threats concerning Tarhuna and the Libyan Arab Jamahiriya.

=== Art collection ===
During his 200 trips on the African continent, Harvey collected arts and artifacts. Some collections were gifts given to him by African leaders.

== Death ==
Robert Zayd Muhammad "Balozi" Harvey died, on December 28, 2016, at the age of 76. His funeral was held, on December 31, 2016, with Maulana Karenga giving the homage. Newark Mayor Ras Baraka issued a statement, following Harvey's death, saying, "Few have done more to build bridges between African nations and the black communities of America". Following Harvey's death, the Balozi R.M.Z. Harvey Foundation was created, in his honor. Essex County executive Joseph N. Di Vincenzo Jr. dedicated a bronze plaque, in Harvey's honor, in Essex County's Legend Way.
