= Charlie Biot =

American baseball player

- Outfielder
- Born: October 18, 1917; Orange, New Jersey, U.S.
- Died: March 10, 2000 (aged 82); East Orange, New Jersey, U.S.
- Batted: Right Threw: Right

Negro league baseball debut
- 1939, for the Newark Eagles

Last appearance
- 1941, for the Baltimore Elite Giants
- Stats at Baseball Reference

Teams
- Newark Eagles (1939); New York Black Yankees (1939–1940); Baltimore Elite Giants (1940–1941)

Charles Augustus Biot Jr. (October 18, 1917 – March 10, 2000) was an American Negro league outfielder from 1939 to 1941.

A native of Orange, New Jersey, Biot played baseball at East Orange High School, and broke into the Negro leagues in 1939. He played for the Newark Eagles, New York Black Yankees, and Baltimore Elite Giants.

Biot served in the United States Army during World War II and was assigned to the Harlem Hellfighters, where he captained his division's baseball team. According to his honorable discharge, he served from November 12, 1942 through January 23, 1946. He is listed as 6'1/2" and 192 pounds. At the time of his separation, he was a Corporal serving as a mortar gunner in Company I, 369th Infantry Regiment, 93rd Infantry Division. Under "battles and campaigns," his discharge lists the Bismarck Archipelago, New Guinea, and the Northern Solomons. His decorations and citations include the American Theater Ribbon, the Asiatic-Pacific Theater Ribbon, the Good Conduct Medal, and the Victory Medal.

He died in East Orange in 2000 at age 82.
