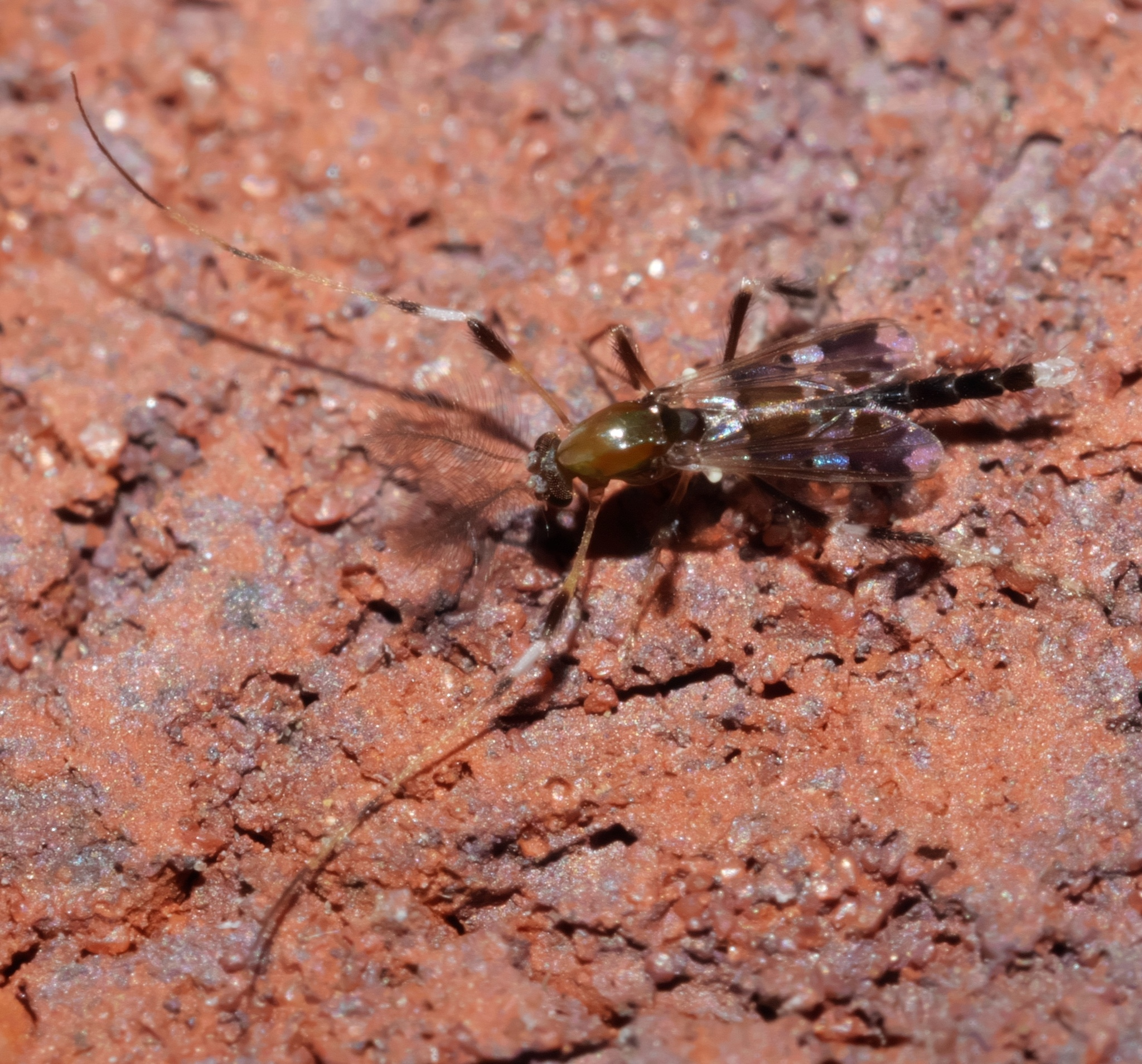
- Kribiodorum perpulchrum, Oklahoma

Scientific classification
- Kingdom: Animalia
- Phylum: Arthropoda
- Class: Insecta
- Order: Diptera
- Family: Chironomidae
- Subfamily: Chironominae
- Tribe: Chironomini
- Genus: Kribiodorum; Kieffer, 1921

= Kribiodorum =

Genus of non-biting midges

Kribiodorum is a genus of midges in the family Chironomidae. There are about five described species in Kribiodorum, found in Africa, North America, the Neotropics, and Asia.

== Species ==
These six species belong to the genus Kribiodorum:

- Kribiodorum amazonicum Dantas & Hamada, 2021 (Neotropics)
- Kribiodorum belalong Cranston, 2018 (Borneo)
- Kribiodorum kunene Cranston, 2018 (Namibia)
- Kribiodorum malicky Cranston, 2018 (Thailand)
- Kribiodorum perpulchrum (Mitchell, 1908) (North America)
- Kribiodorum pulchrum Kieffer 1921 (Africa)
