= Edward E. Gnichtel =

American politician

Edward E. Gnichtel (April 25, 1869 − December 21, 1933) was a New Jersey businessman and Republican Party politician who represented Essex County in the New Jersey General Assembly.

He was born in Newark on April 25, 1869, and lived in Essex County his whole life.

Early in his career he worked as a traveling salesman for a brush manufacturing company; in 1894 he started his own business, the Newark Brush Company. In 1901 he was elected to the New Jersey General Assembly, and was re-elected in 1902 and 1903. In 1910, he was the Republican Party nominee for Mayor of Newark.

Other positions he held included Fire Commissioner in Newark, from 1903; Jury Commissioner in Essex County, from 1913; and member of the Newark Board of Health, from 1915. He became Collector of Internal Revenue in Newark in 1925, and resigned in 1927. His brother, Frederick W. Gnichtel, was at one point mayor of Trenton.

A resident of East Orange, New Jersey, he died on December 21, 1933, at Newark Memorial Hospital.
