= Harry A. Augenblick =

American politician (1888–1948)

Member of the New Jersey General Assembly
- In office 1919–1919

Personal details
- Born: May 1, 1888 New York City, New York
- Died: August 29, 1948 (aged 60) New York City, New York
- Party: Democratic
- Education: Newark High School
- Alma mater: Cornell University; New York University

Harry A. Augenblick (May 1, 1888 – August 29, 1948) was an American civil engineer, attorney, investor, and Democratic Party politician from Newark, New Jersey who served in the New Jersey General Assembly in 1919.

== Early life and education ==
Harry A. Augenblick was born on May 1, 1888, in New York City to Jacob and Pauline Augenblick. He was raised in Newark, New Jersey, where he graduated from public schools and Newark High School. He graduated from Cornell University with a degree in civil engineering in 1910 and received a Juris Doctor from New York University.

== Career ==
After completing his undergraduate degree, Augenblick joined the New York Public Service Commission as an assistant engineer, resigning after six months to become an instructor at the University of Michigan College of Engineering for the 1910–11 academic year. After the term, he joined the J. G. White & Company as a construction engineer and worked in London, the Caucasus, and Siberia. He returned to the United States in 1912 to work for the New York Central Railroad, where he assisted in the construction and design of the New York City Subway and of Grand Central Terminal.

Augenblick was admitted to the New Jersey bar in 1915 as an attorney and in 1918 as a counselor. He joined the firm of former Essex County prosecutor Jacob L. Newman before setting up his own practice at the National State Bank Building in Newark. While practicing law, he continued to teach mechanical engineering at the Fawcett School of Industrial Arts. He later formed the Newark firm of Koehler, Augenblick & Freedman.

In 1919, Augenblick was elected to the New Jersey General Assembly on the Democratic ticket. He served a single term during the 1919 session.

In April 1920, Augenblick and two others incorporated the G. & W. Realty Company in Newark.

Before 1941, he was a senior member of the New York brokerage firm of Eisele, King & Studdiford. Later, he established Augenblick & Kohn, a New York Stock Exchange brokerage firm with offices in New York City and Newark and member. In 1944, he was elected a director of the Pacific Coast Company, a conglomerate of coal mining, railroad, fuel, and lumber interests on the Pacific coast and Alaska, to succeed William W. Watson. His election came as a compromise between management and investors critical of the company's record of failing to declare any dividends. He was also a director of the Vulcan Iron Works in Wilkes-Barre, Pennsylvania.

== Personal life and death ==
Augenblick married Bertha Greenburger in Norwich, Connecticut, on September 22, 1915. She died on January 2, 1917. He remarried to Bessie Lee Marks in Richmond, Virginia on January 6, 1924, and they had at least two children.

He was a member of the Lawyers Club of Essex County, the American Society of Civil Engineers, the Cornell Club, the University of Michigan Club, and the Fraternal Order of Eagles.

He died on August 29, 1948, at Manhattan General Hospital after a long illness. He was a resident of East Orange at the time and was survived by his wife and two children.
