= C. Milford Orben =

American politician

Charles Milford Orben (June 28, 1898 – March 13, 1975) was an American Republican Party politician who served five terms in the New Jersey General Assembly.

== Biography ==
Orben, commonly known by his middle name, was born in Newark, New Jersey on June 28, 1898, the son of Charles Orben, a land developer and home builder who later served as a Councilman in Hopatcong, New Jersey. He was a graduate of East Orange High School and Pennsylvania State College.

He married Harriet G. Tibman in 1926. He became the Republican Municipal Chairman of Millburn, New Jersey in 1936. Orben was elected to the New Jersey State Assembly in 1938, and was re-elected in 1939, 1940, 1941 and 1942. He served as Chairman of the Assembly Miscellaneous Business Committee.

Orben died March 13, 1975.
