= Marietta Patricia Leis =

American artist and poet (born 1938)

- Born: August 31, 1938 (age 88); Newark, New Jersey, United States
- Education: University of New Mexico, Antioch University Los Angeles
- Occupations: Artist and poet
- Known for: Interdisciplinary arts
- Website: www.mariettaleis.com

Marietta Patricia Leis (born 1938 in Newark, New Jersey) is an interdisciplinary artist and poet living in Santa Fe, New Mexico, who uses material processes to create reductive artworks that reference nature and the environment. Leis has participated in artist residencies throughout the world, and her work has been shown internationally in both solo and group exhibitions and acquired by several museums and public collections.

== Education ==
Growing up, Leis was educated in the public schools of East Orange, New Jersey, United States. She studied modern dance and classical ballet on scholarships and grantsm beginning at seven years of age. While in high school, she was an apprentice performer in dance/acting at the White Barn Theatre, Westport, Connecticut, and was exposed to her first acting classes on Shakespeare with Eva Le Gallienne. She graduated high school in 1957 in the top 10 percent of her class and moved to New York City, where she studied acting with Lee Strasberg and dance with Matt Mattox and Robert Joffrey. She was an actress and dancer in Off-Broadway, experimental film, television and movies, most notably playing the student in The Lesson, a one-act play by Eugène Ionesco.

In 1985, she received an MA in painting from New Mexico State University. In 1987, she spent eight months in Italy, where she studied Italian in an intensive course at the Universita of Stranieri, Perugia. She received her MFA from UNM in 1988 and began teaching in the UNM Continuing Education program.

== Work ==
In 1982–83, Leis moved from Los Angeles, California, to Ranchos de Taos, New Mexico, and soon after to Albuquerque. During this period, she traveled to Italy where she met Mario Merz, Marisa Merz and Algherio Boetti of the Arte Povera movement. In 1988, she published her first poems that related to her visual art, which were included in the catalogue for an exhibition of a series of constructions and mixed media work at the UNM School of Architecture.

From 1994 to 1996, she created The Story of Marietta Robusti Tintoretto, an exhibition that reframed the life of Marietta Robusti and the role she played in her father's famous workshop. The exhibition toured cities in Italy and the United States for five years, and art critic Lucy Lippard wrote an essay for the announcement brochure when the work debuted at the Jonson Gallery, UNM.

A major turning point in her work came in 2001, when she created The Blue Series, her first monochromatic works that were about color and place, inspired by her artist residency at Crater Lake National Park in Oregon.

=== Awards and museum collections ===
In 2019, Leis was chosen for the Edwina and Charles Milner Women in the Arts Award at Western New Mexico University, Silver City, and a group of work was acquired for their permanent collection. Her work is also in the collections of the Harwood Museum of Art in Taos, NM; The Fort Smith Convention Center, AK; and the Johnson Gallery at the University of NM, Albuquerque.

== Selected exhibitions ==
Leis has been actively exhibiting her artwork since her 1983 when she had her first NM solo exhibit titled My Ladies at Phillip Bareiss Gallery, Taos. In 2019, Leis' work was exhibited during the Venice Biennale at the Palazzo Mora, sponsored by the European Cultural Center; she was featured as part of the Alcove series at the New Mexico Museum of Art; and she had a solo exhibition, titled AIR, at the Daugavpils Mark Rothko Art Centre Museum of Modern Art where she was in-residence to present an artist talk and a master class

One of Leis's major exhibition projects was titled The Marietta Robusti Tintoretti Story, which was a result of the artist finding a brief reference to the artist Marietta Robusti Tintoretto in an anthology of women artists and received funding from the E.D. Foundation in 1994, 1995 and 1996. Leis' intention with the exhibition was to resurrect Robusti's name to history. Her research involved travel to Venice and the Uffizi in Florence, Italy. The paintings and prose text that Leis executed toured for six years with her presenting slide lectures, and Lucy Lippard wrote an essay for the exhibit's brochure. Some of the art was acquired for personal collections and the Pinacoteca di Arte Moderna, Teora, Italy, but the majority of art is in the permanent collection of the Museo Italo Americano, San Francisco.

Leis' oil paintings were featured in a solo exhibition at Seton Hall University's Walsh Gallery in Spring 2013 titled Earthly Pleasures.

In 2021, the Center for Contemporary Art in Santa Fe mounted Sense Memories, a solo exhibition that marked the re-opening of the center after being closed due to the COVID-19 pandemic. In 2025, Leis was included in Abstracting Nature, a group exhibition of ten New Mexico artists whose work is informed by the local landscape and informed by specific materials related to the natural world. The exhibition was curated by Josie Lopez and presented at the Albuquerque Museum. Her 20-year retrospective exhibition Marietta Patricia Leis: Breathing Lessons was curated by Marisa Sage for the New Mexico State University Art Museum, on view October 26 through March 6, 2027.
