= Herbert Brucker =

American journalist

Herbert Brucker (1898–1977) was a journalist, teacher, and national advocate for the freedom of the press. Brucker served as editor-in-chief of the Hartford Courant, a newspaper published in Hartford, Connecticut, for 19 years (1947–1966). He also served as president of the American Society of Newspaper Editors. During his career, Brucker authored four books.

== Early life and education ==
Brucker was born in Passaic, New Jersey on October 4, 1898. He attended the Morristown School (now Morristown-Beard School) in Morristown, New Jersey and East Orange High School in East Orange, New Jersey. Brucker received his bachelor's degree from Williams College in Williamstown, Massachusetts in 1921. He then completed his master's degree in journalism at the Graduate School of Journalism at Columbia University. Following his graduation, Brucker spent a year studying at the Sorbonne and the École pratique des hautes études in Paris, France through a Pulitzer Fellowship.

== Journalism career ==
Brucker first worked as a reporter at the Springfield Union (now The Republican) in Springfield, Massachusetts. After completing his graduate studies, he joined The New York World in New York City to serve as assistant editor and editorial writer for the Work section. Brucker later served on the editorial staff of the Review of Reviews, a monthly magazine, and as a writer for the North American Review. During World War II, he worked for the U.S. Office of War Information, a federal agency, for two years (1942–1943). Brucker served as chief of their Media Division and then as associate chief of their Bureau of Overseas Publications. He then joined the Hartford Courant as its associate editor (1944-1946) and then editor-in-chief.

== Academic career ==
In January 1932, Brucker received an appointment as assistant to the Carl W. Ackerman, dean of the Graduate School of Journalism at Columbia University in Manhattan. After receiving an appointment to professor, Bruckner taught at the school until the 1940s.

== Legacy ==
The American Heritage Center at the University of Wyoming in Laramie, Wyoming houses Brucker's papers from 1930 to 1979. The center's collection contains scrapbooks of articles from the Hartford Courant, Brucker's speeches, his plaques and awards, and photographs of him.

== Family ==
Brucker first married Sydney Seabury Cook. They had three children: Christopher and Thomas, and Sydney. After Seabury died in 1950, Brucker married Elizabeth Spock. She had two children from a previous marriage: William and Anthony.

== Works ==
- The Changing American Newspaper (1937)
- Freedom of Information (1949)
- Journalist (1962)
- Communication is power: unchanging values in a changing journalism (1973)
