= Freeman Craw =

American typeface designer (1917–2017)

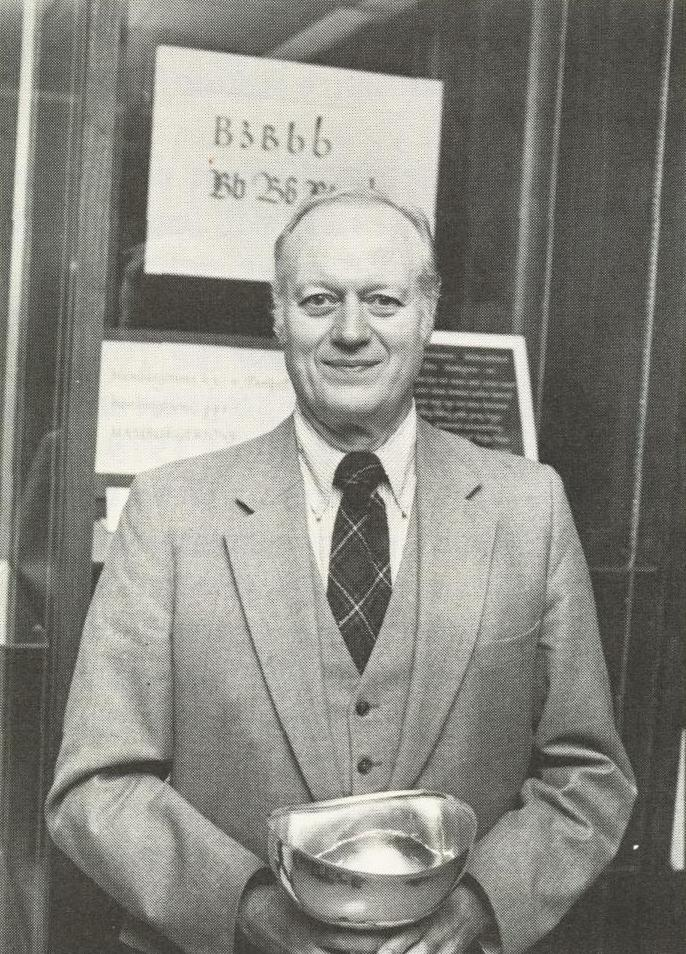
- Craw in 1981
- Born: Freeman Godfrey Craw; January 17, 1917; East Orange, New Jersey, US
- Died: May 1, 2017 (aged 100); Tinton Falls, New Jersey, US
- Other name: Freeman Jerry Craw
- Education: Cooper Union School of Art
- Occupation: Type designer
- Awards: Frederic W. Goudy Award (1981)

Freeman Godfrey Craw (January 17, 1917 – May 1, 2017) was an American typeface designer. His typefaces designed Craw Clarendon, Craw Modern and Ad Lib for American Type Founders.

Craw was born on January 17, 1917, in East Orange, New Jersey, where he attended East Orange High School. He graduated at Cooper Union School of Art in 1939.

From 1943 to 1968, he worked as an art director then vice president for Tri-Arts Press. In 1946, he was a founding member of Type Directors Club. In 1966, Craw commissioned two typefaces for CBS, under the direction of Lou Dorfsman. In 1981, he received Frederic W. Goudy Award, and in 1988, he achieved honorary membership.

Craw had been a resident of the Short Hills section of Millburn, New Jersey, until 2001, when he moved to Tinton Falls, New Jersey, where he died on May 1, 2017.

== Typefaces ==
- Craw Clarendon series
  - Craw Clarendon (1955)
  - Craw Clarendon Book (1957)
  - Craw Clarendon Condensed (1960)
- Craw Modern series
  - Craw Modern (1958)
  - Craw Modern Bold (1959)
  - Craw Modern Italic (1964)
- Ad Lib (1961)
