= Tyrone Brown (lawyer) =

American lawyer (born 1942)

Commissioner of the Federal Communications Commission
- In office November 15, 1977 – January 31, 1981
- President: Jimmy Carter; Ronald Reagan

Personal details
- Born: November 5, 1942 (age 83) Norfolk, Virginia, U.S.
- Party: Democratic
- Education: Hamilton College (AB); Cornell Law School (JD)

Tyrone Brown (born November 5, 1942) is an American attorney and retired government official. From 1977 to 1981, Brown served as a member of the Federal Communications Commission (FCC). Brown is currently a consulting counsel at Wiley Rein LLP, a law firm based in Washington, D.C.

== Early life and education ==
Brown was born on November 5, 1942, in Norfolk, Virginia, and grew up in East Orange, New Jersey. In 1960, Brown graduated from East Orange High School. He received an A.B. from Hamilton College. In 1967, he graduated with a LL.B. with distinction from Cornell Law School, where he was Managing Editor of the Cornell Law Review.

== Career ==
=== Law career ===
After graduation, he served as the first, and so far only, African American law clerk for a Chief Justice when he served for Earl Warren of the Supreme Court of the United States during the 1967-1968 Term. In 1968, Brown joined Covington & Burling's Washington, D.C., office. From 1970, he held a series of federal government appointments and staff positions at the United States Senate, and then several corporate posts in publishing. From 1974 to 1977, he was an attorney at Caplin & Drysdale in Washington, D.C.

=== Federal Communications Commission (FCC) ===
In 1977, President Jimmy Carter appointed Brown to the Federal Communications Commission, succeeding Benjamin Hooks. Initially, Brown declined the offer for the 21 months left on the term over concern on reappointment. Hamilton Jordan, an aide to Carter, persuaded Brown to accept. After approval by the Senate, Brown began his term on November 15, 1977, while continuing his participation in civil rights advocacy.

One of his goals as commissioner was to increase minority ownership of broadcasting stations. In 1978, he opposed dropping "public interest" from the FCC's consideration for broadcast licenses. On June 11, 1979, Carter nominated Brown for reappointment to the FCC for a seven-year term and he was confirmed. On January 31, 1981, Brown resigned from the Commission following the election of President Ronald Reagan, and was replaced by Mark S. Fowler.

=== Post-FCC career ===
Later, Brown practiced law at Steptoe & Johnson and at Wiley Rein LLP, as well as serving as president of the Media Access Project from 2010 to 2013.

== See also ==
- List of law clerks for the chief justice of the United States

Government offices
Preceded by Benjamin Hooks	Commissioner of the Federal Communications Commission; November 15, 1977–January 31, 1981	Succeeded by Mark S. Fowler
