= Adolph Wegrocki =

American politician

Adolph Wegrocki (November 29, 1900 – September 1953) was an American physician and Republican Party politician who served five terms in the New Jersey General Assembly.

He was born November 29, 1900, in Kingston, New York, the son of Joseph Wegrocki (1877-1940) and Victoria Wegrocki, immigrants from Poland. He moved to Newark, in 1901, where he attended public and parochial schools. He attended the University of Pennsylvania and the Temple University School of Medicine. He had a medical practice in Newark from 1929 until his death in 1953. He served as Chairman of the New Jersey Polish State Republican League. He married Irene E. Badowska (1904-2003) in 1927.

Wegrocki was elected to the New Jersey State Assembly in 1938, and was re-elected in 1939, 1940, 1941 and 1942. In 1939, a priest sued Wegrocki for failing to repay a personal loan he made to help set up a medical practice. The priest was awarded a judgment of $2,454. New Jersey Supreme Court Justice Charles W. Parker ruled that while the priest was entitled to garnish Wegrocki's wages to collect his judgment, he could not put a lien on Wegrocki's annual legislative salary of $500, since state law prohibited garnishing the wages of someone who made less than $18 a week.
