= Karimu Hill-Harvey =

American lawyer

Karimu Hill-Harvey is a retired Municipal Court Judge serving East Orange, New Jersey, Irvington, New Jersey and Newark, New Jersey. She has been an attorney in practice for over 24 years. Karimu Hill-Harvey was the first ever African-American woman to be listed in the "Top 20 Verdicts and Settlements" in the New Jersey Law Journal for obtaining a $3.25 million settlement in Grant V. Laresca, et al. The case led to the creation of a new law, as did her work on Simmons-Dixon v. Ford Motor Corporation, and several other cases.

== Career ==
A graduate of Seton Hall University School of Law in 1983, Karimu Hill-Harvey served as an attorney in law for twenty-four years. For more than fifteen years she served as Senior Associate Counsel for the Housing Authority of the City of Newark, New Jersey. She also spent her time working as an arbitrator for the New York Stock Exchange, the American Arbitration Association and FINRA.

Hill-Harvey is admitted to the U.S. Supreme Court Bar, the United States Court of Appeals for the Third Circuit Bar, the United States District Court for the District of New Jersey and the New Jersey State Bar Association. in 2000, she completed the LL.M Trial Advocacy Program at Temple University.

Hill-Harvey is known in New Jersey for her public work as a community organizer.
