= East Orange STEM Academy =

High school in Essex County, New Jersey, US

Location
- 129 Renshaw Avenue; East Orange, Essex County, New Jersey 07017; United States
- 40.7767°N 74.2030°W

Information
- Type: Magnet public high school
- Established: September 2011
- School district: East Orange School District
- NCES School ID: 340423002040
- Principal: Vincent Stallings
- Faculty: 37.0 FTEs
- Grades: 6-12
- Enrollment: 646 (as of 2024–25)
- Student to teacher ratio: 17.5:1
- Website: stem.eastorange.k12.nj.us

East Orange STEM Academy is a specialty magnet public school that serves students in sixth through twelfth grades in East Orange, in Essex County, in the U.S. state of New Jersey, operating as part of the East Orange School District. The school focuses on the STEM fields, the academic disciplines of science, technology, engineering, and mathematics. It helps to further the education of students in these fields.

As of the 2024–25 school year, the school had an enrollment of 646 students and 37.0 classroom teachers (on an FTE basis), for a student–teacher ratio of 17.5:1. There were 104 students (16.1% of enrollment) eligible for free lunch and 19 (2.9% of students) eligible for reduced-cost lunch.

== History ==
The school was established in September 2011, replacing the East Orange Campus 9 High School with a school that focused on developing student skills in the STEM fields.

== Administration ==
The principal is Vincent Stallings. His administrative team includes two assistant principals.
