= Lester E. Mahr =

American politician

New Jersey State Assemblyman
- In office January 1939 – January 1944
- Preceded by: Raymond W. Schroeder
- Succeeded by: Frederic Stoddard

Personal details
- Born: Lester E. Mahr; February 23, 1903 Newark, New Jersey, U.S.
- Died: January 1, 1971 (aged 67) Lakewood, New Jersey, U.S.
- Party: Republican
- Spouse: Carol Mason Cobb (m. 1929)
- Children: 3
- Education: New Jersey Law School

Lester E. Mahr (February 23, 1903 – January 1, 1971) was an American Republican Party politician who served five terms representing Essex County in the New Jersey General Assembly.

== Early life ==
He was born in Newark, New Jersey on February 23, 1903, the son of George L. Mahr and Louise E. Abrahams Mahr. He was a 1924 graduate of New Jersey Law School. He was admitted to the bar in 1924.

== Political career ==
Mahr was elected to the New Jersey State Assembly in 1938, and was re-elected in 1939, 1940, 1941 and 1942. He was the Chairman of the Assembly Committee on Elections.

In March, 1943, Mahr resigned his position as Counsel to Essex County Superintendent of Elections and Commissioner of Registration Anthony P. Miele following accusations that holding two state positions was in violation of the New Jersey Constitution. Mahr maintained that there was no "constitutional incompatibility" in holding both jobs.

== Family ==
Mahr married Carol Mason Cobb on June 21, 1929. They had three children: Carol Lou Mahr, George L. Mahr, and Robert L. Mahr.
