= Evelyn Groesbeeck Mitchell =

American entomologist and physician

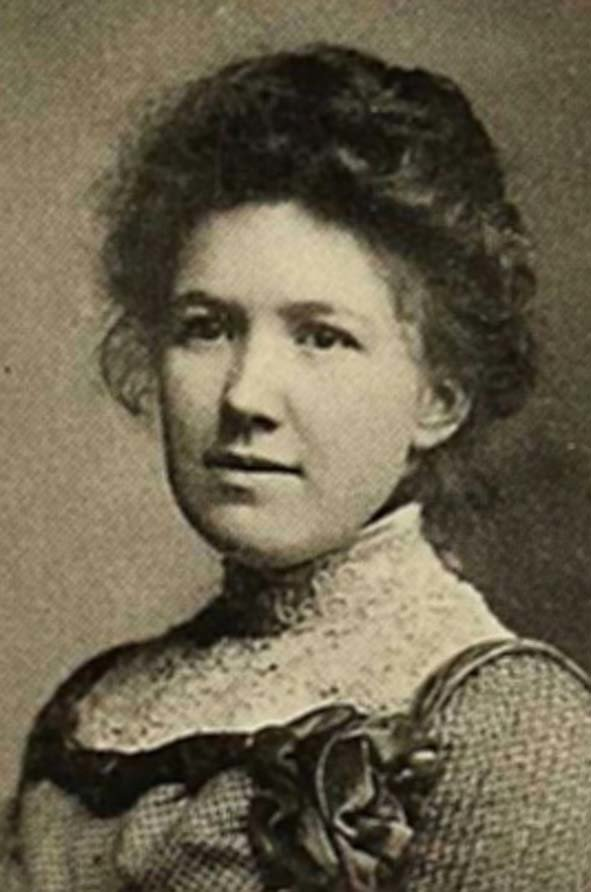
- Born: June 14, 1879
- Died: October 31, 1964 (aged 85)
- Alma mater: Cornell University; George Washington University; Howard University
- Occupation: Entomologist, medical doctor, social reformer, scientific illustrator, writer, teacher, surgeon
- Employer: United States National Museum

Evelyn Groesbeeck Mitchell (June 14, 1879 – October 31, 1964) was an American entomologist and physician.

== Life ==
Evelyn Groesbeeck Mitchell was born on June 14, 1879, in East Orange, New Jersey. She attended and graduated from East Orange High School. In 1898 she started attending Cornell University. She attended Barnard College for her second year but returned to Cornell the following year and graduated in 1902 with a bachelor's degree. She went to study at George Washington University in 1904 and graduated with a Master of Science degree in 1906. During her studies at George Washington University, she was assistant to Dr. James William Dupree, the Surgeon General of Louisiana at the time. From 1904 to 1912, she was a scientific illustrator at the United States National Museum. She was also a member of the Entomological Society of America.

In 1913, she earned a M.D. from Howard University College of Medicine. From 1913 to 1914 she was an intern at a Women's hospital in Philadelphia and from 1914 onward she was a practicing physician. She worked as a doctor in Pennsylvania during the 1918 flu epidemic. She was also a visiting neurologist at Freedman's Hospital beginning in 1915. She was superintendent at Park Hospital, and Boston City Hospital.

Aside from working as a physician, Mitchell also taught at universities and volunteered in summer schools for African American students. Additionally, she testified in court to support women who had been assaulted and held a discussion group with prisoners in Norfolk County, Massachusetts.

Evelyn died October 31, 1964.

== Works ==
- Mosquito Life New York, G. P. Putnam's Sons, 1907; reprint Wentworth Press 2019, ISBN 978-0469146983
- Descriptions of Nine New Species of Gnats Journal of the New York Entomological Society, Vol. 16, No. 1 (Mar., 1908), pp. 7–14 (8 pages)
- An Apparently New Protoblattid Family from the Lower Cretaceous Smithsonian Miscellaneous Collections, Vol. 52, No. 6 (1910), pp. 85–86.
