= Olive C. Sanford =

American politician

Olive Corning Sanford (December 19, 1875 - March 4, 1970) was an American Republican Party politician who served in the New Jersey General Assembly.

== Early life ==
Born Olive Terry Corning in Palmyra, New York on December 19, 1875, she was the daughter of Joseph W. Corning (1814–1890) and Louise E Newton (1839–1919). She attended schools in Palmyra and New York City. She was an 1898 graduate of Teachers College, Columbia University and was a school teacher for two years before marrying Frederic H. Sanford (1867–1927) in 1900. They lived in South America for four years, and returned in 1904 following the birth of her son, Frederic Corning Sanford. She moved to Nutley, New Jersey in 1915.

She served as President of the Nutley League of Women Voters from 1925 to 1928, and as President of the New Jersey League of Women Voters from 1928 to 1934.

== Political career ==
Sanford was elected to the Board of Education of the Nutley Public Schools in 1928 and re-elected in 1931. She was elected again in 1937 and re-elected in 1940.

In 1934, Sanford was elected to the New Jersey State Assembly, and was re-elected in 1935. She was defeated for re-election in 1936, but regained her seat in 1937. She was re-elected in 1938, 1939, 1940, 1941 and 1942. In 1940 her opponent was Peter W. Rodino.

As Chair of the Assembly Education Committee in 1936, Sanford introduced legislation to create a statewide system of junior colleges.

In 1947, Sanford was a Delegate to the New Jersey Constitutional Convention.
