= Chris Fletcher =

American football player (born 1948)

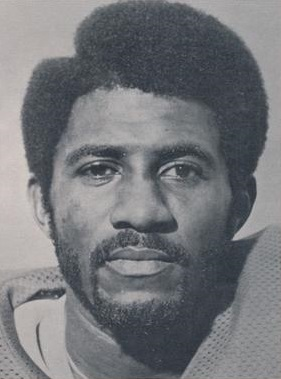
- Fletcher in 1976

No. 44
- Position: Cornerback

Personal information
- Born: December 25, 1948 (age 77); Morristown, New Jersey, U.S.
- Listed height: 5 ft 11 in (1.80 m)
- Listed weight: 185 lb (84 kg)

Career information
- High school: East Orange (East Orange, New Jersey)
- College: Temple
- NFL draft: 1970: 9th round, 223rd overall pick

Career history
- San Diego Chargers (1970–1976)

Career NFL statistics
- Interceptions: 13
- INT yards: 237
- Touchdowns: 1
- Stats at Pro Football Reference

Chris Fletcher (born December 25, 1948) is an American former professional football player who was a safety in the National Football League (NFL). He played college football for the Temple Owls and was selected by the San Diego Chargers in the ninth round of the 1970 NFL draft.

Fletcher played his entire seven-year career for the Chargers from 1970 to 1976.

== Early life ==
Fletcher grew up in East Orange, New Jersey, and attended East Orange High School.
