= Jacob S. Glickenhaus =

American politician (1905–1966)

New Jersey State Assemblyman
- In office January 1939 – January 1945

Essex County Freeholder
- In office January 1945 – January 1953

Essex County Court Judge
- In office 1953–1964

New Jersey Superior Court Judge
- In office 1964 – 1966 (His Death)

Personal details
- Born: Jacob S. Glickenhaus; August 3, 1905 Newark, U.S.
- Died: December 13, 1966 (aged 61) East Orange, U.S.
- Party: Republican
- Spouse: Edith Nieburg Glickenhaus

Jacob S. Glickenhaus (August 3, 1905 – December 13, 1966) was an American Republican Party politician who served in the New Jersey General Assembly and as a New Jersey Superior Court Judge.

== Early life ==
Glickenhaus was born on August 3, 1905, in Newark, New Jersey, the son of Samuel and Jennie Glickenhaus. He attended public schools in Newark and was a graduate of New York Law School. He was admitted to the Bar in 1926 and became a partner in the Newark firm of Glickenhaus and Glickenhaus.

== Political career ==
He served as Secretary of the Newark Ninth Ward Republican Committee. He was elected to the State Assembly in 1938, and re-elected in 1939, 1940, 1941, 1942 and 1943. During his six years as an Assemblyman, he served as Chairman of the Assembly Appropriations Committee and as Essex County Delegation leader.

Glickenhaus did not seek re-election to the State Assembly in 1944 but instead won election to the Essex County Board of Freeholders. He was re-elected in 1947 and 1950.

In 1953, Governor Alfred Driscoll appointed Glickenhaus to serve as an Essex County Court Judge. Governor Richard J. Hughes elevated him to the Superior Court in 1964, and in 1965 he became the Assignment Judge for Essex County.

== Family ==
Glickenaus died on December 13, 1966, after a short illness. He was the Essex County Assignment Judge at the time of his death. He was survived by his wife, Edith Nieburg Glickenhaus, and his daughter, Dale Glickenhaus.
