= East Orange School District =

School district in Essex County, New Jersey, US

Address
- 199 4th Avenue East Orange, Essex County, New Jersey, 07017; United States
- Coordinates: 40.774261°N 74.221546°W

District information
- Grades: Pre-K to 12
- Superintendent: Christopher C. Irving
- Business administrator: Tia Thomas
- Schools: 20
- Affiliation: Former Abbott district

Students and staff
- Enrollment: 9,337 (as of 2023–24)
- Faculty: 633.0 FTEs
- Student–teacher ratio: 14.8:1

Other information
- District Factor Group: A
- Website: www.eastorange.k12.nj.us
Ind.	Per pupil	District spending	Rank (*)	K-12 average	%± vs. average
1A	Total Spending	$25,032	100	$18,891	32.5%
1	Budgetary Cost	17,725	97	14,783	19.9%
2	Classroom Instruction	9,723	87	8,763	11.0%
6	Support Services	3,571	99	2,392	49.3%
8	Administrative Cost	1,631	79	1,485	9.8%
10	Operations & Maintenance	2,553	95	1,783	43.2%
13	Extracurricular Activities	105	3	268	−60.8%
16	Median Teacher Salary	81,073	96	64,043
Data from NJDoE 2014 Taxpayers' Guide to Education Spending. *Of K-12 districts with more than 3,500 students. Lowest spending=1; Highest=103

East Orange School District is a comprehensive community public school district serving students in pre-Kindergarten through twelfth grade from the city of East Orange, in Essex County, in the U.S. state of New Jersey. The district is one of 31 former Abbott districts statewide that were established pursuant to the decision by the New Jersey Supreme Court in Abbott v. Burke which are now referred to as "SDA Districts" based on the requirement for the state to cover all costs for school building and renovation projects in these districts under the supervision of the New Jersey Schools Development Authority.

As of the 2023–24 school year, the district, comprised of 20 schools, had an enrollment of 9,337 students and 633.0 classroom teachers (on an FTE basis), for a student–teacher ratio of 14.8:1.

== History ==
In 2003, Patrick Healy Middle School was identified as one of seven "persistently dangerous" public schools in New Jersey. The designation has since been removed.

The district had been classified by the New Jersey Department of Education as being in District Factor Group "A", the lowest of eight groupings. District Factor Groups organize districts statewide to allow comparison by common socioeconomic characteristics of the local districts. From lowest socioeconomic status to highest, the categories are A, B, CD, DE, FG, GH, I and J.

== Schools ==
Schools in the district (with 2023–24 enrollment data from the National Center for Education Statistics) are:

Early childhood education centers

- Althea Gibson Early Childhood Academy (131 students; in grades PreK and K)
  - Renee N. Richardson, principal
- Wahlstrom Academy (159; PreK–K)
  - Leslie Shults, principal

Elementary schools

- Benjamin Banneker Academy (487; PreK–8)
  - Monica D. Burton, principal
- Edward T. Bowser School of Excellence (528; PreK–5)
  - Brian Heaphy, principal
- Mildred Barry Garvin School (236; PreK and 3–5)
  - Tabina H. Adam, principal
- Whitney E. Houston Academy of Creative and Performing Arts (327; PreK–8)
  - Henry Hamilton, principal
- Langston Hughes Elementary School (568; PreK–5)
  - Howard Walker, principal
- Garfield Jackson Academy (238; PreK–5)
  - Bridgett Green, principal
- Touissant Louverture School (262; PreK–5)
  - Ameenah Poole, principal
- Sheila Y. Oliver Academy (438; PreK–8)
  - Yvy Joseph, principal
- Gordon Parks Academy (295; PreK–2)
  - Sharon Alsbrook-Davis, principal
- Cicely L. Tyson Community Elementary School of the Performing and Fine Arts (488; PreK–5)
  - Koree Toles, principal
- Dionne Warwick Institute (412; PreK–5)
  - Passion Moss-Hasan, principal

Middle schools

- Sojourner Truth Middle School (262; 6)
  - Flore-Nadeige Lovett, principal
- Patrick F. Healy Middle School (329; 7–8)
  - Kamalia Scantlebury, acting principal
- John L. Costley Middle School (320; 7–8). The school was named in honor of John L. Costley Sr., a local community activist who was a World War I veteran and member of the 369th Infantry Regiment, also known as the Harlem Hellfighters.
  - Thelma Ramsey-Bryant, principal

High schools

- Cicely Tyson School of Performing and Fine Arts (695; 6–12)
  - John English, principal
- East Orange Campus High School located on the former campus of Upsala College (1,751; 9–12)
  - Taniesha Whitaker, principal
- East Orange STEM Academy (609; 6–12)
  - Vincent Stallings, principal

Other

- Fresh Start Academy (NA; 6–12)
  - Devon Reed, supervisor

== Administration ==
Core members of the district's administration are:

- Christopher C. Irving, superintendent of schools
- Tia Thomas, school business administrator

== Board of education ==
The district's board of education is comprised of seven members who set policy and oversee the fiscal and educational operation of the district through its administration. As a Type I school district, the board's trustees are appointed by the mayor to serve three-year terms of office on a staggered basis, with either two or three members up for reappointment each year. Of the more than 600 school districts statewide, East Orange is one of about a dozen districts with an appointed school board. The board appoints a superintendent to oversee the district's day-to-day operations and a business administrator to supervise the business functions of the district.
