= Constance W. Hand =

American politician

Constance W. Hand (September 11, 1895 – December 14, 1982) was an American Republican Party politician who served six terms in the New Jersey General Assembly.

Raised in East Orange, New Jersey, she attended East Orange High School and graduated from Vassar College. She later attended Drake Secretarial School, and worked as a substitute teacher and law clerk before marrying Clarence J. Hand in 1917. From 1926 to 1931, Hand served as Justice of the Peace in Orange, New Jersey. She was elected to the New Jersey General Assembly in 1934, and was re-elected in 1935. She lost her bid for re-election in 1936, but won her seat back in 1937. She was again re-elected in 1938, 1939 and 1940. She died in 1982 in Dade County, Florida at the age of 97.
