= 1895 United States gubernatorial elections =

- November 5, 1895; April 3, 1895 (RI)

9 governorships
	Majority party	Minority party
Party	Republican	Democratic
Seats before	22	20 (Note: William T. Watson (D) succeeded Delaware Governor Joshua H. Marvil (R) who died in office in April 1895.)
Seats after	26	17
Seat change	▲4	▼3
Seats up	4	4
Seats won	8	1
	Third party	Fourth party
Party	Populist	Silver
Seats before	1	1
Seats after	1	1
Seat change	Steady	Steady
Seats up	0	0
Seats won	0	0
- Democratic gain Democratic hold Republican gain Republican hold

United States gubernatorial elections were held in 1895, in nine states.

Kentucky, Maryland and Mississippi held their gubernatorial elections in odd numbered years, every 4 years, preceding the United States presidential election year. New Jersey at this time held gubernatorial elections every 3 years. It would abandon this practice in 1949. Massachusetts and Rhode Island both elected its governors to a single-year term. They would abandon this practice in 1920 and 1912, respectively. Iowa and Ohio at this time held gubernatorial elections in every odd numbered year.

Utah held its first gubernatorial election on achieving statehood.

== Results ==
State	Incumbent	Party	Status	Opposing candidates
Iowa	Frank D. Jackson	Republican	Retired, Republican victory	Francis M. Drake (Republican) 52.00% Washington I. Babb (Democratic) 37.23% Sylvester B. Crane (Populist) 8.02% Francis Bacon (Prohibition) 2.74%
Kentucky	John Y. Brown	Democratic	Term-limited, Republican victory	William O'Connell Bradley (Republican) 48.29% Parker Watkins Hardin (Democratic) 45.80% Thomas S. Pettit (Populist) 4.74% T. P. Demaree (Prohibition) 1.17%
Maryland	Frank Brown	Democratic	Retired, Republican victory	Lloyd Lowndes Jr. (Republican) 52.01% John E. Hurst (Democratic) 44.20% Joshua Levering (Prohibition) 3.21% Henry F. Andrews (Populist) (Note: Andrews also stood on the Socialist Labor ticket.) 0.57%
Massachusetts	Frederic T. Greenhalge	Republican	Re-elected, 56.77%	George F. Williams (Democratic) 37.06% Edward Kendall (Prohibition) 2.79% E. Gerry Brown (Populist) 2.37% Moritz E. Ruther (Socialist Labor) 0.99% Scattering 0.01%
Mississippi	John Marshall Stone	Democratic	Term-limited, Democratic victory	Anselm J. McLaurin (Democratic) 72.85% Frank Burkitt (Populist) 27.15%
New Jersey	George Theodore Werts	Democratic	Term-limited, Republican victory	John W. Griggs (Republican) 52.28% Alexander T. McGill (Democratic) 43.64% Henry W. Wilbur (Prohibition) 2.14% George B. Keim (Socialist Labor) 1.33% William B. Ellis (Populist) 0.61%
Ohio	William McKinley	Republican	Retired, Republican victory	Asa S. Bushnell (Republican) 51.00% James E. Campbell (Democratic) 39.94% Jacob S. Coxey Sr. (Populist) 6.29% Seth H. Ellis (Prohibition) 2.54% William Watkins (Socialist Labor) 0.22%
Rhode Island (held, 3 April 1895)	Daniel Russell Brown	Republican	Retired, Republican victory	Charles W. Lippitt (Republican) 56.89% George L. Littlefield (Democratic) 32.39% Smith Quimby (Prohibition) 5.95% George Ellsworth Boomer (Socialist Labor) 3.92% William Foster Jr. (Populist) 0.86%
Utah	New state			Heber Manning Wells (Republican) 50.32% John Thomas Caine (Democratic) 44.73% Henry W. Lawrence (Populist) 4.95%

== Bibliography ==
- Glashan, Roy R. (1979). American Governors and Gubernatorial Elections, 1775-1978. Meckler Books. ISBN 0-930466-17-9.
- Gubernatorial Elections, 1787-1997. Washington, D.C.: Congressional Quarterly Inc. 1998. ISBN 1-56802-396-0.
- Dubin, Michael J. (2014). United States Gubernatorial Elections, 1861-1911: The Official Results by State and County. Jefferson, North Carolina: McFarland. ISBN 978-0-7864-4722-0.
- The World Almanac and Encyclopedia, 1896. New York, NY: The Press Publishing Co. 1896.
- Rhoades, Henry Eckford, ed. (1896). The Tribune Almanac and Political Register, 1896. New York, NY: The Tribune Association.
