= List of speakers of the New Jersey General Assembly =

Speaker of the New Jersey General Assembly
- Coat of arms of New Jersey

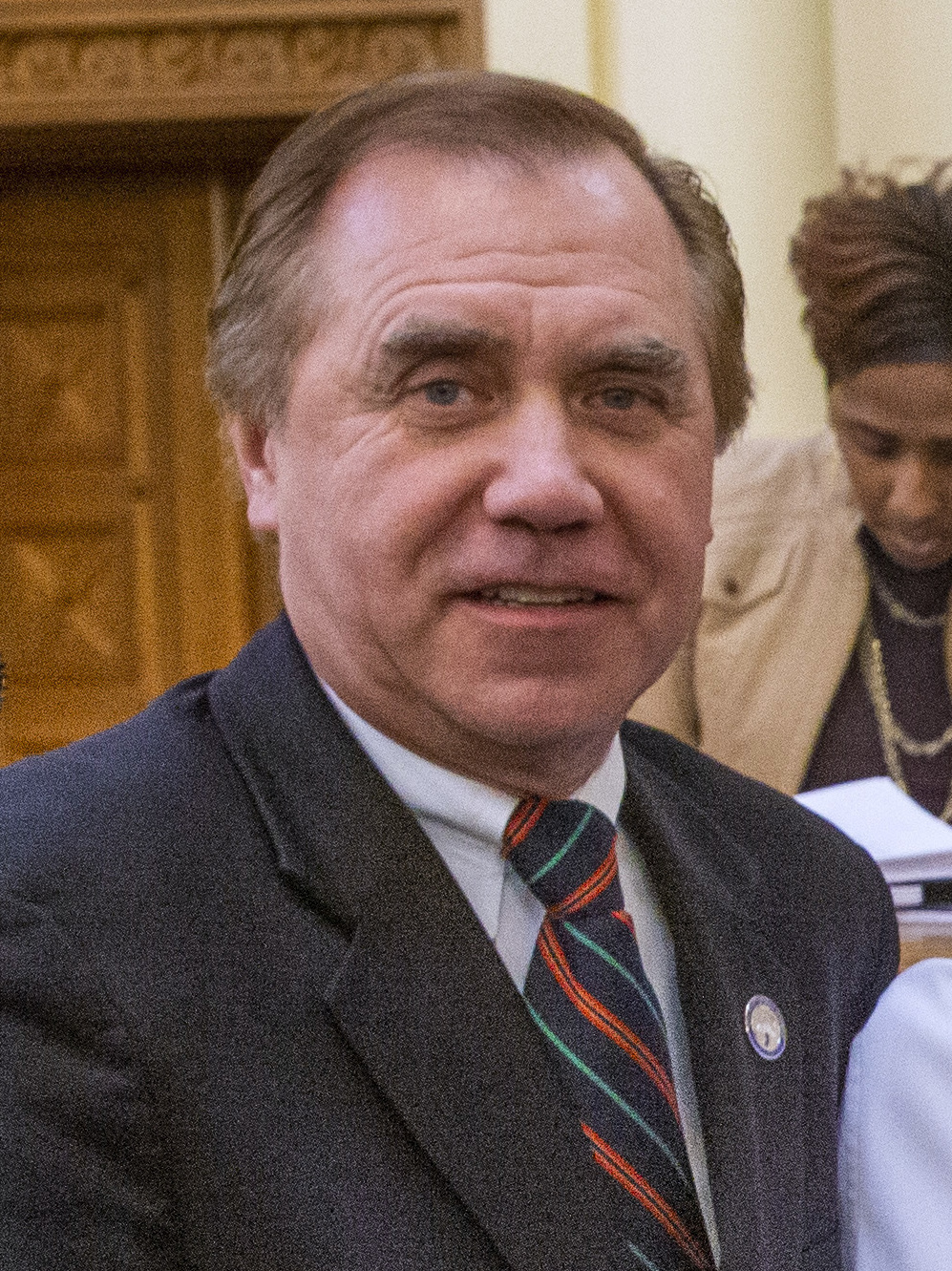
- Incumbent; Craig Coughlin since January 9, 2018
- Status: Presiding officer
- Seat: Trenton, New Jersey
- Term length: Two years, renewable
- Constituting instrument: New Jersey Constitution of 1947 (current); Proprietary Charter of New Jersey (initial)
- Inaugural holder: Thomas Gardiner
- Formation: March 31, 1664 (362 years ago)
- Deputy: Deputy Speaker
- Website: www.njleg.state.nj.us

The speaker of the New Jersey General Assembly, commonly known as the speaker of the Assembly or Assembly speaker, is presiding officer of the New Jersey General Assembly, the lower house of the New Jersey Legislature. The speaker is elected by the membership of the chamber. After the lieutenant governor and president of the New Jersey Senate, the speaker of the Assembly is third in the line of succession to replace the governor of New Jersey in the event that the governor is unable to execute the duties of that office.

The speaker generally determines the legislative agenda of the Assembly through his or her power to determine the schedule of votes, to determine which bills will be brought for consideration, and to appoint the chairs of Assembly committees.

The current speaker is Craig Coughlin of Woodbridge Township. Coughlin is the longest-serving speaker in the history of the office, having been in office since January 9, 2018. Under the 1844 state constitution, most speakers served only for a single session of the Assembly.

The first female speaker of the Assembly was Marion West Higgins, who served in 1965.

== List of Assembly speakers ==
The following is a list of speakers of the Assembly since 1703.

Speakers of the New Jersey General Assembly
No.	Speaker	Term in office	Party	Constituency (Hometown)
-	Thomas Gardiner	1703 – 1704	N/A	City of Burlington
-	Peter Fretwell	1704 – 1706	N/A	City of Burlington
-	Samuel Jennings	1707	N/A	City of Burlington
-	Thomas Gordon	1708 – 1709	N/A	City of Perth Amboy
-	John Kay	1709 – 1714	N/A	Gloucester County
-	Daniel Coxe IV (1673–1739)	1716	N/A	Gloucester County
-	John Kinsey	1716 – 1719	N/A	Middlesex County
-	John Johnstone	1721 – 1722	N/A	City of Perth Amboy
-	William Trent (c. 1653–1724)	1723 – December 25, 1724	N/A	Burlington County
-	John Johnstone	1725 – 1729	N/A	City of Perth Amboy
-	John Kinsey Jr.	1730 – 1733	N/A	Middlesex County
From 1733–38, no Assembly was called or elected by the provincial government.
-	John Kinsey Jr.	1738	N/A	Middlesex County
-	Joseph Bonnell	1738 – 1739	N/A	Essex County
-	Andrew Johnston (1694–1762)	1740 – 1744	N/A	City of Perth Amboy
-	Samuel Nevill	1744 – 1745	N/A	City of Perth Amboy
-	Robert Lawrence	1746 – 1748	N/A	City of Perth Amboy
-	Samuel Nevill	1748 – 1751	N/A	City of Perth Amboy
-	Charles Read	1751 – 1754	N/A	City of Burlington
-	Robert Lawrence	1754 – 1758	N/A	Monmouth County
-	Samuel Nevill	1759 – 1762	N/A	City of Perth Amboy
-	Robert Ogden	1763 – 1765	N/A	Essex County
-	Cortlandt Skinner (1727–1799)	1765 – 1770	N/A	City of Perth Amboy
-	Stephen Crane	1770 – 1772	N/A	Essex County
-	Cortlandt Skinner (1727–1799)	1773 – 1775	N/A	City of Perth Amboy
On December 6, 1775, royal governor William Franklin prorogued the legislature until January 3, 1776, but it never met again. On May 30, 1776, Franklin attempted to convene the legislature, but was arrested by the New Jersey Provincial Congress. On July 2, 1776, the Provincial Congress approved a new constitution which ordered new elections.
1	John Hart (c. 1713–1779)	1776 – 1778	Independent	Hunterdon County
2	Caleb Camp	1778 – 1779	[data missing]	Essex County
3	Josiah Hornblower (1729–1809)	1780	[data missing]	Essex County
4	John Meheim	1781	[data missing]	Hunterdon County
5	Ephraim Harris	1782 – 1783	[data missing]	Cumberland County
6	Daniel Hendrickson	1784	[data missing]	Monmouth County
7	Benjamin Van Cleve	1784 – 1786	[data missing]	Hunterdon County
-	Ephraim Harris	1787	[data missing]	Cumberland County
-	Benjamin Van Cleve	1788	[data missing]	Hunterdon County
8	John Beatty (1749–1826)	1789	Federalist	Middlesex County
9	Jonathan Dayton (1760–1824)	1790	Federalist	Essex County
10	Ebenezer Elmer (1752–1843)	1791	Republican	Cumberland County
11	Silas Condict (1738–1801)	1792 – 1794	Republican	Morris County
-	Ebenezer Elmer (1752–1843)	1795	Republican	Cumberland County
12	James H. Imlay (1764–1823)	1796	Federalist	Monmouth County
-	Silas Condict (1738–1801)	1797	Republican	Morris County
13	William Coxe Jr. (1762–1831)	1798 – 1800	Federalist	Burlington County
14	Silas Dickerson	1801	Federalist	Sussex County
-	William Coxe Jr. (1762–1831)	1802	Federalist	Burlington County
15	Peter Gordon	1803	Republican	Hunterdon County
16	James Cox (1753–1810)	1804 – 1807	Republican	Monmouth County
17	Lewis Condict (1772–1862)	1808 – 1809	Republican	Morris County
18	William Kennedy (c. 1775–1826)	1810 – 1811	Republican	Sussex County
19	William Pearson	1812	Republican	Burlington County
20	Ephraim Bateman (1780–1829)	1813	Federalist	Cumberland County
21	Samuel Pennington	1814 – 1815	Republican	Essex County
22	Charles Clark	1816	Republican	Essex County
-	Ebenezer Elmer	1817	Republican	Cumberland County
23	David Thompson Jr.	1818 – 1822	Republican	Morris County
24	Lucius Elmer (1793–1883)	1823	Republican	Cumberland County
25	David Johnston	1824	Republican	Hunterdon County
26	George K. Drake	1825 – 1826	Jacksonian	Morris County
27	William B. Ewing	1827 – 1828	National Republican	Cumberland County
28	Alexander Wurts	1829 – 1831	Jacksonian	Hunterdon County
29	John Peter Jackson	1832	National Republican	Essex County
30	Daniel Bailey Ryall (1798–1864)	1833 – 1835	Democratic	Monmouth County
31	Thomas G. Haight	1836	Democratic	Monmouth County
32	Lewis Condict (1772–1862)	1837 – 1838	Democratic	Morris County
33	William Stites	1839	Whig	Essex County
34	John Emley	1840 – 1841	Whig	Burlington County
35	Samuel Halsey	1842	Whig	Morris County
36	Joseph Taylor	1843 – 1844	Whig	Cumberland County
The Constitution of 1844 expanded the General Assembly to 60 members, elected annually and apportioned to the then-nineteen counties by population.
37	Isaac Van Wagenen	1845	Democratic	Essex County
38	Lewis Howell	1846	Whig	Cumberland County
39	John W. C. Evans	1847 – 1848	Whig	Burlington County
40	Edward W. Whelpley (1818–1864)	1849	Whig	Morris County
41	John T. Nixon (1820–1889)	1850	Whig	Cumberland County
42	John H. Phillips	1851	Democratic	Mercer County
43	John Huyler (1808–1870)	1852	Democratic	Bergen County
44	John W. Fennimore	1853 – 1854	Democratic	Burlington County
45	William Parry	1855	Whig (Note: Parry was elected by a coalition of Whigs and Americans (Know-Nothing).)	Burlington County
46	Thomas W. Demarest	1856	Democratic	Bergen County
47	Andrew Dutcher	1857	Democratic	Mercer County
48	Daniel Holsman	1858	Democratic	Bergen County
49	Edwin Salter	1859	Opposition	Ocean County
50	Austin H. Patterson (d. 1905)	1860	Democratic	Monmouth County
51	Frederick H. Teese (1823–1894)	1861	Democratic	Essex County
52	Charles Haight (1838–1891)	1862	Democratic	Monmouth County
53	James T. Crowell	1863	Democratic	Middlesex County
54	Joseph N. Taylor	1864	Democratic	Passaic County
55	Joseph T. Crowell (1817–1891)	1865	Democratic	Union County
56	John Hill (1821–1884)	1866	National Union	Morris County
57	G. W. N. Curtis	1867	National Union	Camden County
58	Augustus O. Evans	1868	Democratic	Hudson County
59	Leon Abbett (1836–1894)	1869 – 1870	Democratic	Hudson County
60	Albert P. Condit	1871	National Union	Essex County
61	Nathaniel Niles	1872	National Union	Morris County
62	Isaac L. Fisher	1873	National Union	Middlesex County
63	Garret Hobart (1844–1899)	1874	Republican	Passaic County
64	George O. Vanderbilt	1875	Democratic	Mercer County
65	John D. Caracallen	1876	Republican	Hudson County
66	Rudolph F. Rabe	1877	Democratic	Hudson County
67	John Egan	1878	Democratic	Union County
68	Schuyler B. Jackson	1879	Republican	Essex County
69	Sherman B. Oviatt	1880	Republican	Monmouth County
70	Harrison Van Duyne	1881	Republican	Essex County
71	John T. Dunn (1838–1907)	1882	Democratic	Union County
72	Thomas O'Connor	1883	Democratic	Essex County
73	A. B. Stoney	1884	Republican	Monmouth County
74	Edward Ambler Armstrong (1858–1932)	1885 – 1886	Republican	Camden County (Camden)
75	William M. Baird	1887	Republican	Warren County
76	Samuel D. Dickinson	1888	Democratic	Hudson County
77	Robert S. Hudspeth	1889	Democratic	Hudson County
78	Willliam Christian Heppenheimer	1890	Democratic	Hudson County
79	James J. Bergen (1847–1923)	1891 – 1892	Democratic	Somerset County
80	Thomas Flynn	1893	Democratic	Passaic County
81	John I. Holt	1894 – May 26, 1894	Democratic	Passaic County
82	Joseph Cross (1843–1913)	1894 – 1895	Republican	Union County
83	Louis T. DeRousse	1896	Republican	Camden County
84	George W. MacPherson	1897	Republican	Mercer County
85	David Ogden Watkins (1862–1938)	1898 – 1899	Republican	Gloucester County (Woodbury)
86	Benjamin Franklin Jones (1869–1935)	1900	Republican	Essex County (Maplewood)
87	William J. Bradley (1852–1916)	1901 – 1902	Republican	Camden County (Camden)
88	John G. Horner	1903	Republican	Burlington County
89	John Boyd Avis (1875–1944)	1904 – 1905	Republican	Gloucester County (Woodbury)
90	Samuel K. Robbins (1853–1926)	1906	Republican	Burlington County (Chester)
91	Edgar E. Lethbridge	1907	Democratic	Essex County
92	Frank B. Jess	1908	Republican	Camden County
93	John Dyneley Prince (1868–1945)	1909	Republican	Passaic County (Ringwood)
94	Harry P. Ward	1910	Republican	Bergen County
95	Edward Kenny	1911	Democratic	Hudson County
96	Thomas F. McCran (1875–1925)	1912	Republican	Passaic County (Paterson)
97	Leon Rutherford Taylor (1883–1924)	1913 – October 28, 1913	Democratic	Monmouth County (Asbury Park)
98	Azariah M. Beekman	1914	Democratic	Somerset County
99	Carlton Godfrey (1865–1929)	1915	Republican	Atlantic County (Atlantic City)
100	Charles C. Pilgrim	1916	Republican	Essex County
101	Edward Schoen	1917	Republican	Essex County
102	Charles A. Wolverton (1880–1969)	1918	Republican	Camden County (Camden)
103	Arthur N. Pierson (1867–1957)	1919	Republican	Union County (Westfield)
104	W. Irving Glover	1920	Republican	Bergen County
105	George S. Hobart (1875–1938)	1921	Republican	Essex County (Newark)
106	T. Harry Rowland	1922	Republican	Camden County
107	William Wadsworth Evans (1887–1972)	1923	Republican	Passaic County (Paterson)
108	Harry G. Eaton	1924	Republican	Essex County
109	Clifford Ross Powell (1893–1973)	1925	Republican	Burlington County (Mount Holly
110	Ralph W. Chandless	1926	Republican	Bergen County
111	Anthony J. Siracusa	1927	Republican	Atlantic County
112	Thomas L. Hanson	1928	Republican	Middlesex County
113	Guy Gabrielson (1891–1976)	1929	Republican	Essex County
114	William B. Knight	1930	Republican	Camden County
115	Russell S. Wise	1931	Republican	Passaic County
116	Joseph Greenberg	1932	Democratic	Hudson County
117	Charles A. Otto Jr.	1933 – November 14, 1933	Republican	Union County
118	Herbert J. Pascoe	1933	Republican	Union County
119	Joseph Altman	1934	Republican	Atlantic County
120	Lester H. Clee (1888–1962)	1945	Republican	Essex County (Newark)
121	Marcus W. Newcomb	1936	Republican	Burlington County
122	Thomas Glynn Walker (1899–1993)	1936 – November 30, 1936	Democratic	Hudson County (Jersey City)
123	Fred W. De Voe	1936	Republican	Middlesex County
124	Herbert J. Pascoe	1938 – 1939	Republican	Union County
125	Roscoe P. McClave	1940 – 1941	Republican	Bergen County
126	John E. Boswell	1942	Republican	Cape May County
127	Manfield G. Amlickie	1942	Republican	Passaic County
128	Dominic A. Cavicchia (1901–1983)	1943	Republican	Essex County (Newark)
129	Freas L. Hess	1944	Republican	Somerset County
130	Walter H. Jones (1912–1982)	1945	Republican	Bergen County (Norwood)
131	Leon Leonard (1909–1995)	1946	Republican	Atlantic County
132	Joseph L. Brescher	1947	Republican	Union County
133	Hugh L. Mehorter	1949	Republican	Gloucester County
134	Percy A. Miller Jr. (1889–1984)	1950	Republican	Essex County (Irvington)
135	James E. Fraser	1950	Republican	Atlantic County
136	Merrill H. Thompson	1951	Republican	Monmouth County
137	Lawrence A. Cavinato	1952	Republican	Bergen County
138	Elvin R. Simmill	1953	Republican	Monmouth County
139	G. Clifford Thomas	1954	Republican	Union County
140	Paul M. Salsburg	1955	Republican	Atlantic County
141	Leo J. Mosch	1956	Republican	Essex County
142	Elden Mills (1908–1965)	1957	Republican	Morris County
143	William F. Hyland (1923–2013)	1958	Democratic	Camden County (Cherry Hill)
144	William Kurtz	1959	Democratic	Middlesex County
145	Maurice V. Brady (1904–1991)	1960	Democratic	Hudson County
146	Le Roy J. D'Aloia	1961	Democratic	Essex County
147	John W. Davis (1918–2003)	1962	Democratic	Salem County
148	Elmer Matthews (1927–2015)	1963	Democratic	Essex County
149	Alfred N. Beadleston (1912–2000)	1964	Republican	Monmouth County
150	Marion West Higgins (1915–1991)	1965	Republican	Bergen County (Hillsdale)
-	Maurice V. Brady (1904–1991)	1966	Democratic	Hudson County
151	Frederick H. Hauser	1966	Democratic	Hudson County
152	Robert J. Halpin	1968	Republican	Cumberland County
153	Albert S. Smith	1969	Republican	District 2
154	Peter Moraites (1922–2014)	1970	Republican	District 13D (Edgewater)
155	William K. Dickey (1920–2008)	1970	Republican	District 3C; Collingswood)
156	Barry T. Parker (1932–)	1971	Republican	District 4B (Mount Holly)
157	Thomas Kean (1935–)	1972 – 1974	Republican	District 11E (Livingston)
158	S. Howard Woodson (1916–1999)	1974 – 1976	Democratic	13th district (Trenton)
159	Joseph A. LeFante (1928–1997)	1977	Democratic	31st district (Bayonne)
160	William J. Hamilton (1932–2019)	1977	Democratic	17th district (New Brunswick)
161	Christopher Jackman (1916–1991)	1978 – 1982	Democratic	33rd district (West New York)
162	Alan Karcher (1943–1999)	January 12, 1982 – January 14, 1986	Democratic	19th district (Sayreville)
163	Chuck Hardwick (1941–2025)	January 14, 1986 – 1990	Republican	21st district (Westfield)
164	Joseph Doria (1946–)	1990 – 1992	Democratic	31st district (Bayonne)
165	Chuck Haytaian (1938–2024)	1992 – January 9, 1996	Republican	23rd district (Mansfield)
166	Jack Collins (1943–)	January 9, 1996 – January 8, 2002	Republican	3rd district (Pittsgrove)
167	Albio Sires (1951–)	January 8, 2002 – January 10, 2006	Democratic	33rd district (West New York)
168	Joseph J. Roberts (1952–)	January 10, 2006 – January 12, 2010	Democratic	5th district (Bellmawr)
169	Sheila Oliver (1952–2023)	2010 – January 14, 2014	Democratic	34th district (East Orange)
170	Vincent Prieto (1960–)	2014 – January 9, 2018	Democratic	32nd district (Secaucus)
171	Craig Coughlin (1958–)	January 9, 2018 – present	Democratic	19th district (Woodbridge)
