= Elvin W. Crane =

American politician (1853–1909)

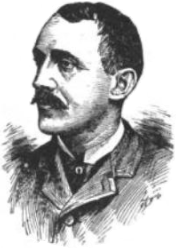

Member of the New Jersey General Assembly
- In office 1887

Personal details
- Born: Elvin Williamson Crane; October 20, 1853 Brooklyn, New York
- Died: January 9, 1909 (aged 55) Newark, New Jersey
- Party: Democratic
- Spouse: Emma J. Esch (m. 1879)
- Education: St. Paul's School
- Occupation: Lawyer, politician

Elvin Williamson Crane (October 20, 1853 – January 9, 1909) was an American lawyer and Democratic party politician from New Jersey. He was the Democratic nominee for Governor of New Jersey in 1898.

== Biography ==
Crane was born in Brooklyn, New York in 1853 to Samuel Crane and Naomi Williamson. His family settled in Newark, New Jersey when he was a child. He attended public schools in Newark and St. Paul's School. He began his study of law in the offices of Joseph P. Bradley, who would later serve on the United States Supreme Court, and Gustavus N. Abeel, later prosecutor of the pleas of Essex County. He received his license as attorney in 1875 and as counsellor in 1882.

Crane married Emma J. Esch on July 9, 1879. They had two children, but both died young.

In 1887 he was elected to the New Jersey General Assembly. He served as an assistant prosecutor for Essex County and then was appointed county prosecutor by Governor Robert Stockton Green. He was reappointed by Governor George Theodore Werts, serving until 1899.

In 1898 Crane was the Democratic candidate for Governor of New Jersey. He faced the Republican candidate Foster MacGowan Voorhees, who was serving as acting governor after the appointment of John W. Griggs as United States Attorney General. Voorhees accused the Democrats of corruption, claiming that Crane was the tool of the party boss, United States Senator James Smith, Jr. Voorhees defeated Crane by a vote of 164,051 to 158,552.

After his term as Essex County Prosecutor ended in 1899, Crane pursued a private legal practice until 1907, when he was appointed county counsel. In 1909 he died at his home in Newark at the age of 55.

Party political offices
Preceded by Alexander T. McGill	Democratic Nominee for Governor of New Jersey; 1898	Succeeded by James M. Seymour
