= Catherine Baker =

Catherine or Catharine Baker may refer to:

- Catherine Baker Knoll (1930–2008), lieutenant governor of Pennsylvania
- Catharine Baker (born 1971), American politician formerly serving in the California State Assembly
- Cathy Baker (actress) (born 1947), American actress known for Hee Haw
- Cathy Baker (field hockey) (born 1957), New Zealand field hockey player
- Kate Baker (Catherine Baker, 1861–1953), teacher and literary guardian of Joseph Furphy's works

== See also ==
- Katharine Baker (1876–1919), American short story writer, lawyer, and educator
- Kathy Baker (born 1950), American stage, film and television actress
- Kathy Baker (rugby union), Irish rugby union player
- Kathy Guadagnino (born 1961), American golfer who played under her maiden name of Kathy Baker
- Katie Baker (born 1984), Canadian field hockey player
- Baker (surname)
