= J. Thompson Baker =

American politician

Jacob Thompson Baker
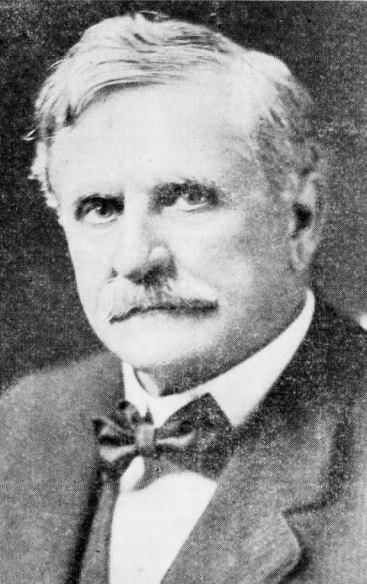
- Lewisburg Journal (Lewisburg, PA), August 8, 1913

Member of the U.S. House of Representatives from New Jersey's 2nd district
- In office March 4, 1913 – March 3, 1915
- Preceded by: John J. Gardner
- Succeeded by: Isaac Bacharach

1st Mayor of Wildwood, New Jersey
- In office 1911–1912
- Preceded by: Latimer R. Baker (As mayor of Wildwood Borough)
- Succeeded by: Frank E. Smith

Personal details
- Born: April 13, 1847 Cowan, Pennsylvania, U.S.
- Died: December 7, 1919 (aged 72) Philadelphia, Pennsylvania, U.S.
- Party: Democratic
- Relations: Philip P. Baker (brother)
- Children: Katharine Baker
- Profession: Attorney; Real estate developer

Jacob Thompson Baker (April 13, 1847 – December 7, 1919) was an American attorney, banker, and Democratic Party politician who represented New Jersey's 2nd congressional district for one term from 1913 to 1915. He also served as the first mayor of Wildwood, New Jersey.

== Early life and education ==
J. Thompson Baker was born on a farm in Union County, Pennsylvania, near Cowan on April 13, 1847. He attended the public schools and Bucknell University.

== Legal and business career ==
He studied law, was admitted to the bar in 1870 and commenced practice in Lewisburg, Pennsylvania. He was a member of the Pennsylvania Bar Association and was an instrumental figure in the creation of various public utilities in Pennsylvania. He was president of the Union National Bank of Lewisburg.

Around 1905, he relocated to the city of Wildwood, New Jersey, where he and his brothers played an active role of the founding and development of the city and neighboring Wildwood Crest as resort towns. He became president of the Wildwood Title and Trust Company and the Wildwood and Delaware Short Line Railroad.

== Political career ==
=== Pennsylvania ===
While living in Pennsylvania, Baker was the unsuccessful Democratic Party nominee to represent Union County in Congress several times. During the administration of President Grover Cleveland, he was offered multiple federal appointments but declined.

In 1905, Baker was elected as permanent chairman of the Pennsylvania Democratic State Convention, despite having moved permanently to New Jersey.

=== New Jersey ===
In 1910, he was a delegate to the New Jersey Democratic State Convention, where he seconded the nomination of Woodrow Wilson for governor.

In 1911, he was elected the first mayor of the reincorporated city of Wildwood. In 1912, he was elected as a district delegate to the 1912 Democratic National Convention, representing New Jersey's 2nd congressional district.

=== U.S. House of Representatives ===
In 1912, Baker was elected to represent the 2nd district in the United States House of Representatives. He was an unsuccessful candidate for reelection in 1914, losing to Isaac Bacharach. Until 1936, he was the only Democratic representative in the history of the district.

After leaving Congress, he resumed real estate activities in Wildwood.

== Personal life and death ==
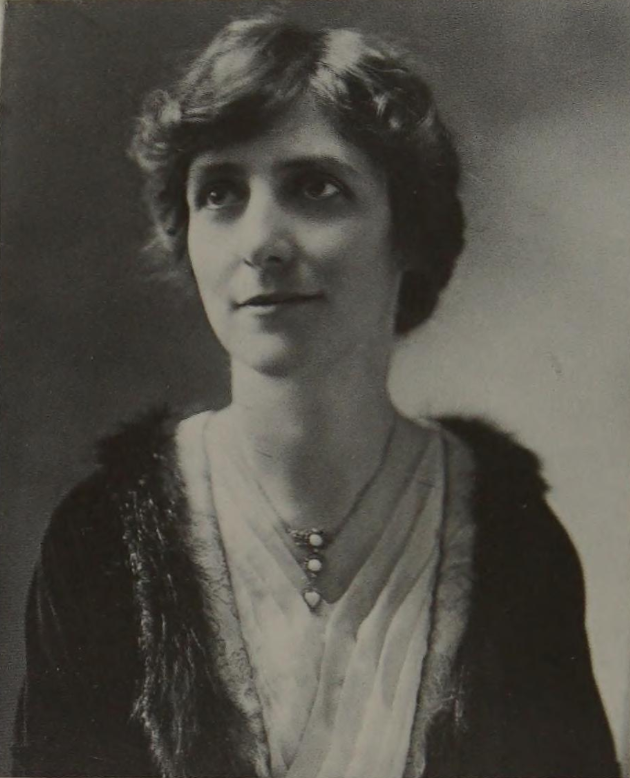
Baker's daughter Katharine (1876–1919) was a leading suffragist who died from illness contracted during World War I. He died shortly after her.

Baker and his wife had at least four daughters, including Katharine Baker, a leading suffragist, lawyer, magazine writer, and corporal in the French Army during World War I. Katherine Baker died on September 23, 1919 following a physical breakdown from pleurisy and pneumonia she contracted during the war.

Baker died of uremia in at St. Agnes's Hospital in Philadelphia on December 7, 1919, shortly after the death of his daughter Katherine. He was interred in Cold Spring Presbyterian Cemetery in Cold Spring, New Jersey.

Baker's home, the J. Thompson Baker House was added to the National Register of Historic Places in 1966.

U.S. House of Representatives
Preceded by John J. Gardner	Member of the U.S. House of Representatives from New Jersey's 2nd congressional district March 4, 1913 – March 3, 1915	Succeeded by Isaac Bacharach
