= Edward Ambler Armstrong =

Speaker of the New Jersey General Assembly
- In office 1885–1886
- Preceded by: A. B. Stoney
- Succeeded by: William M. Baird

Member of the New Jersey General Assembly from Camden County
- In office 1884–1887

Personal details
- Born: December 28, 1858 Woodstown, New Jersey
- Died: March 1, 1932 (aged 73) Lawrenceville, New Jersey
- Party: Republican

Edward Ambler Armstrong (December 28, 1858 - March 1, 1932) was an American attorney, jurist, and Republican Party politician who represented Camden County in the New Jersey General Assembly from 1884 to 1887. He served as speaker of the Assembly from 1885 to 1886.

== Early life and education ==
Edward Ambler Armstrong was born in Woodstown, New Jersey on December 28, 1858 to Francis W. Armstrong and Rebecca Brown (née Jess) Armstrong. After graduating from high school, he attended Bucknell University. He studied law with Benjamin D. Shreve and was admitted to the bar as an attorney in 1880 and as a counselor in 1885.

== Legal career ==
Armstrong began working in corporate law in Camden in 1880. He was a member of the Camden County Bar Association, the New Jersey State Bar Association, and the American Bar Association (ABA). He was a member of the general council of the ABA and served as its chair from 1926 to 1928. Within the ABA, he advocated for changes to improve the standards of the legal profession.

== Political and judicial career ==
=== New Jersey General Assembly ===
Armstrong was elected to the New Jersey General Assembly in 1883 and re-elected in 1884, 1885, and 1886. He presided over the Assembly as speaker in 1885 and 1886.

=== Judicial appointments and public legal representation ===
In 1888, the legislature elected Armstrong as a judge of the Camden District Court. In 1897, he was made presiding judge of the county courts by Governor John W. Griggs, but he retired from the bench in 1902 to resume private practice. In 1906, Governor Edwin Stokes appointed him to the state board of tax equalization, where he served until 1909.

In 1911, he was made assistant general counsel of the Public Service Corporation of New Jersey.

== Personal life and death ==
Armstrong married Mellie M. Fortiner on June 15, 1881. She died on March 23, 1883, shortly after the birth of Armstrong's only child, Wynn, on February 5. He remarried to Carrie W. Morgan on April 30, 1907.

In addition to his bar memberships, Armstrong was a member of the American Archaeological Association, the New Jersey Historical Society, the Pennsylvania Historical Society, the Camden Automobile Club, the Nassau Club, the Union League Club, the Penn Club, the Lawyers' Club of Philadelphia, the Army and Navy Club, the Manhattan Club, the Lotos Club, and the Republican Club of New York.

Armstrong was a collector of Washingtoniana and upon his death, his collection was recognized as among the finest in the United States. He was president of the Princeton Battlefield Association and took part in the restoration of Rockingham, Washington's headquarters at Rocky Hill, New Jersey.

=== Death and burial ===
Armstrong died on March 1, 1932 in Lawrenceville, New Jersey following a three week illness. His funeral was held at the First Baptist Church of Camden, where he was a member for fifty years, and he was buried at Evergreen Cemetery in Camden.
