= 1898 New Jersey gubernatorial election =

- November 8, 1898
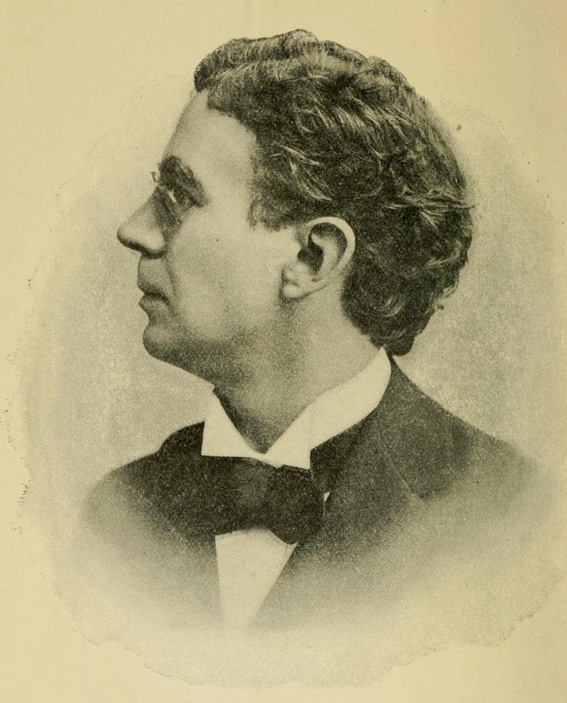

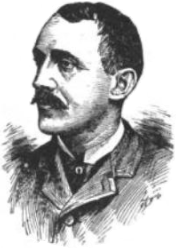
Nominee	Foster McGowan Voorhees	Elvin W. Crane
Party	Republican	Democratic
Popular vote	164,051	158,552
Percentage	48.91%	47.27%
- County results Voorhees: 40–50% 50–60% 60–70% Crane: 50–60%
Governor before election
David Ogden Watkins (acting)
Republican
Elected Governor
Foster McGowan Voorhees
Republican

The 1898 New Jersey gubernatorial election was held on November 8, 1898. Republican nominee Foster McGowan Voorhees defeated Democratic nominee Elvin W. Crane with 48.91% of the vote.

== Democratic nomination ==
=== Essex County convention ===
Elvin W. Crane and James M. Seymour contested the convention to elect delegates to the state convention. Crane won 132 of the 163 delegates, and Seymour withdrew as a candidate, releasing his delegates to support Crane.

=== State convention ===
The Democratic convention in Trenton on September 29 was controversial and chaotic. First, proceedings were disrupted by free silver supporters. A large number of names were placed in nomination, and after a ballot was taken, Robert Davis of Hudson County rose to change the county's 165 votes to Elvin Crane, securing his nomination without a second ballot. The rest of the delegates soon followed, making his nomination formally unanimous.

==== Candidates ====
- Clarence T. Atkinson, Camden attorney and free silver activist
- Christian Braun, State Senator for Passaic County and former mayor of Paterson
- Howard Carrow, Camden attorney
- Elvin W. Crane, Essex County Prosecutor
- William D. Daly, former U.S. Representative from Hoboken
- Richard Grant Augustus Donnelly, Quartermaster General of New Jersey and former mayor of Trenton
- James M. Seymour, mayor of Newark (not nominated)

==== Results ====
1898 Democratic convention, informal ballot
Party	Candidate	Votes	%
Democratic	Elvin W. Crane	441	41.60%
Democratic	William D. Daly	364	34.34%
Democratic	Clarence T. Atkinson	75	7.08%
Democratic	Richard Grant Augustus Donnelly	73	6.89%
Democratic	Christian Braun	72	6.79%
Democratic	James M. Seymour (draft)	19	1.79%
Democratic	Howard Carrow	11	1.04%
Democratic	Lee	2	0.19%
Democratic	Blank	3	0.28%
Total votes		1,060	100.00%

== General election ==
=== Candidates ===
- Elvin W. Crane, Essex County Prosecutor (Democratic)
- Thomas H. Landon (Prohibition)
- Matthew Maguire, machinist and nominee for Vice President of the United States in 1896 (Socialist Labor)
- Frederick Schrayshuen (Populist)
- Foster McGowan Voorhees, State Senator for Union County (Republican)

=== Results ===
New Jersey gubernatorial election, 1898
Party	Candidate	Votes	%	±%
Republican	Foster McGowan Voorhees	164,051	48.91%	▼3.37
Democratic	Elvin W. Crane	158,552	47.27%	▲3.63
Prohibition	Thomas H. Landon	6,893	2.06%	▼0.08
Socialist Labor	Matthew Maguire	5,458	1.63%	▲0.30
Populist	Frederick Schrayshuen	491	0.15%	▼0.46
Majority				
Total votes		335,445	100.00%	
Republican hold		Swing		
