= Benjamin A. Vail =

American jurist and politician (1844-1924)

Benjamin Augustus Vail (August 15, 1844 – August 15, 1924) was an American jurist and Republican Party politician who served as President of the New Jersey Senate.

== Life and career ==
Vail was born in 1844 in Woodbridge Township, New Jersey to Benjamin Franklin and Martha C. (Parker) Vail. He was descended from early Quaker colonists in New Jersey, and his grandfather Benjamin Vail was an early settler of the region between Rahway and Plainfield.

He was educated at Westtown School, a Quaker boarding school in Chester County, Pennsylvania, and then attended Haverford College, graduating in 1865. He studied law at the firm of Parker & Keasbey in Newark, New Jersey and was licensed to practice as an attorney in 1868. He established a law practice in Rahway and was elected to the Common Council there.

From 1876 to 1877 he represented Union County in the New Jersey General Assembly, and he served in the New Jersey Senate from 1879 to 1885. In 1884 he was selected as Senate President.

In 1898 Governor John W. Griggs appointed Vail to the Court of Common Pleas of Union County. He was reappointed to this position in 1903 by Governor Franklin Murphy. In 1906 Governor Edward C. Stokes appointed him as a Circuit Court Judge, his circuit consisting of Hudson, Union, and Somerset counties. He served in this position until 1914.

In 1924 Vail died on his eightieth birthday at Saint Barnabas Hospital in Newark after an operation. He is buried at Hazelwood Cemetery in Rahway, New Jersey.

Political offices
| Preceded by John J. Gardner | President of the New Jersey Senate; 1884 | Succeeded by Abraham V. Schenck |
