= Elizabeth Curtis =

Elizabeth Curtis may refer to:

- Elizabeth Curtis, a character in King Solomon's Mines (1950 film)
- Elizabeth Curtis, U.S. National Dancesport Champion (1979–1985)
- Elizabeth Beers-Curtis (1847–1933), American–French heiress and aristocrat
- Elizabeth Alden Curtis Holman (born 1878/1879), American writer
- Elisabeth Curtis O'Sullivan (1865–1951), American-British painter, writer and interpreter known as Elizabeth Curtis before her marriage

== See also ==
- Betty Curtis (1936–2006), Italian singer
