= J. Thompson Baker House =

Historic house in New Jersey, United States

- U.S. National Register of Historic Places
- New Jersey Register of Historic Places
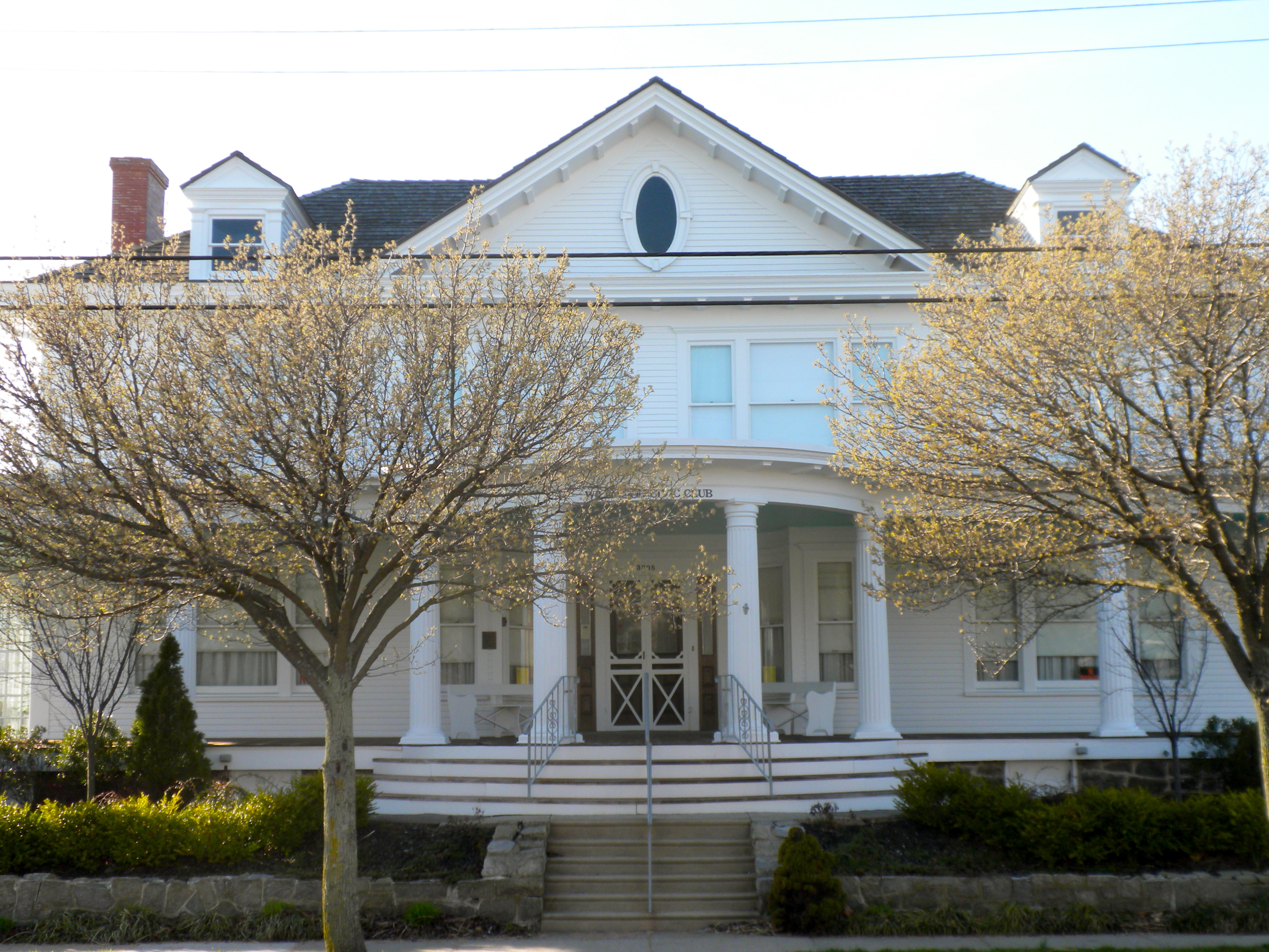

- Location within Cape May County, New Jersey Location within New Jersey Location within the United States
- Location: 3008 Atlantic Avenue, Wildwood, New Jersey
- Coordinates: 38°59′24″N 74°48′36″W
- Built: 1909
- Architect: J. Thompson Baker
- Architectural style: Classical Revival
- NRHP reference No.: 96000551
- NJRHP No.: 3065

Significant dates
- Added to NRHP: May 31, 1996
- Designated NJRHP: November 30, 1995

The J. Thompson Baker House, also known as the Wildwood Civic Club, is located at 3008 Atlantic Avenue in the city of Wildwood in Cape May County, New Jersey, United States. The historic Classical Revival building was built in 1909 and was added to the National Register of Historic Places on May 31, 1996, for its significance in community planning, politics, and social history. It was owned and designed by J. Thompson Baker, a real estate developer and politician who served as mayor of Wildwood, and a member of Congress. The Wildwood Civic Club, a local women's organization, purchased the house in 1935.

== See also ==
- National Register of Historic Places listings in Cape May County, New Jersey
