= Abraham Schenck =

Abraham Schenck may refer to:

- Abraham Schenck (New York senator), American politician from New York and member of the New York senate
- Abraham H. Schenck (1775–1831), U.S. Representative from New York
- Abraham V. Schenck (1821–1902), State Senator from New Jersey
