= 1895 New Jersey gubernatorial election =

- November 5, 1895
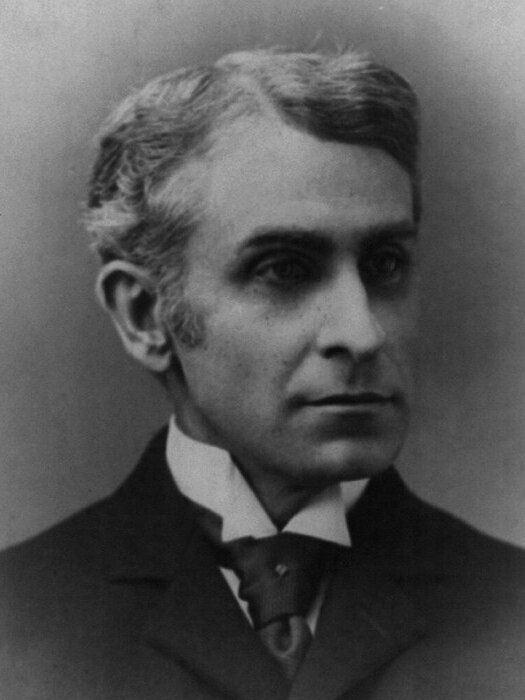

Nominee	John W. Griggs	Alexander T. McGill
Party	Republican	Democratic
Popular vote	162,900	136,000
Percentage	52.28%	43.64%
- County results Griggs: 40–50% 50–60% 60–70% McGill: 50–60%
Governor before election
George Theodore Werts
Democratic
Elected Governor
John W. Griggs
Republican

The 1895 New Jersey gubernatorial election was held on November 5, 1895. Republican nominee John W. Griggs defeated Democratic nominee Alexander T. McGill with 52.28% of the vote.

Griggs was the first Republican elected Governor of New Jersey since Marcus Lawrence Ward in 1865. His election culminated a political realignment in the state from slightly-but-solidly Democratic to Republican; Republicans would not lose another gubernatorial election until 1910.

== Republican nomination ==
=== Candidates ===
- John J. Gardner, U.S. representative from Atlantic City
- John W. Griggs, state senator for Passaic County
- John Kean, former U.S. representative from Elizabeth and nominee for governor in 1892
- Maurice Rogers, state senator for Camden County
- Foster McGowan Voorhees, state senator for Union County
- Elias S. Ward, Newark businessman

=== Convention ===
1895 Republican convention, first ballot
Party	Candidate	Votes	%
Republican	John W. Griggs	294	34.75%
Republican	John Kean	207	24.47%
Republican	Elias S. Ward	168	19.86%
Republican	Maurice Rogers	79	9.34%
Republican	Foster McGowan Voorhees	74	8.75%
Republican	John J. Gardner	23	2.72%
Republican	Toffey	1	0.12%
Total votes		846	100.00%

1895 Republican convention, second ballot
Party	Candidate	Votes	%
Republican	John W. Griggs	338	39.91%
Republican	John Kean	248	29.28%
Republican	Elias S. Ward	166	19.60%
Republican	Foster McGowan Voorhees	65	7.67%
Republican	Maurice Rogers	29	3.42%
Republican	Toffey	1	0.12%
Total votes		847	100.00%

1895 Republican convention, third ballot
Party	Candidate	Votes	%
Republican	John W. Griggs	547	64.58%
Republican	Elias S. Ward	138	16.29%
Republican	John Kean	123	14.52%
Republican	Foster McGowan Voorhees	38	4.49%
Republican	Toffey	1	0.12%
Total votes		847	100.00%

== General election ==
=== Candidates ===
- William B. Ellis (Populist)
- John W. Griggs, state senator for Passaic County (Republican)
- George B. Keim (Socialist Labor)
- Alexander T. McGill, Chancellor of New Jersey (Democratic)
- Henry W. Wilbur (Prohibition)

=== Results ===
New Jersey gubernatorial election, 1895
Party	Candidate	Votes	%	±%
Republican	John W. Griggs	162,900	52.28%	▲4.89
Democratic	Alexander T. McGill	136,000	43.64%	▼6.01
Prohibition	Henry W. Wilbur	6,661	2.14%	▼0.16
Socialist Labor	George B. Keim	4,147	1.33%	▲0.93
Populist	William B. Ellis	1,901	0.61%	▲0.34
Majority				
Turnout				
Republican gain from Democratic		Swing		
