= Philip P. Baker =

American politician (1846-1920)

Member of the New Jersey Senate from Cumberland County
- In office 1887–1890
- Preceded by: Isaac T. Nichols
- Succeeded by: Seaman R. Fowler

Member of the New Jersey General Assembly from the 2nd Cumberland County district
- In office 1883–1884

Personal details
- Born: January 14, 1846 Cowan, Pennsylvania
- Died: August 14, 1920 (aged 74) Philadelphia, Pennsylvania
- Party: Democratic
- Relations: J. Thompson Baker (brother)

Philip Pontius Baker (January 14, 1846 – December 7, 1919) was an American businessman and Democratic Party politician who represented Cumberland County, New Jersey in the New Jersey General Assembly from 1883 to 1884 and New Jersey Senate from 1887 to 1890.

Along with his brothers, Latimer and J. Thompson Baker, he was instrumental in the development of Wildwood and Wildwood Crest as resort towns on the Jersey Shore.

== Early life and education ==
Philip Pontius Baker was born in Cowan, Pennsylvania on January 14, 1846, to Jacob and Catharine (née Pontius) Baker. He was raised on the family's large farm. His father died when he was sixteen, leaving him in charge.

== Business career ==
In 1869, Baker moved to Vineland, New Jersey, where he established a merchandising firm with his brother, Latimer.

In 1891, Baker was appointed receiver of the Philadelphia Seashore Railway. He also served as president of the Tradesmens Bank of Vineland, was vice president of the Wildwood and Delaware Bay Shore Line Railroad and the Wildwood Title Trust Company, and, along with his brothers, was a leading developer in Wildwood and Wildwood Crest, two Jersey Shore resort towns in Cape May County. He organized the narrow-gauge Railroad of Philadelphia and Cape May. He was a member of the Cape May County Chamber of Commerce.

== Political career ==
In 1882, Baker was elected to the New Jersey General Assembly to represent the 2nd Cumberland County district. He was elected to the New Jersey Senate in 1886. In the Senate, he was the primary author of laws to compensate grand jurors, protect the New Jersey oyster industry, and expand manual training tuition in public schools. He was also the primary sponsor of the bill establishing a New Jersey Training School for Feeble Minded Children and the State Institution for Feeble Minded Women, both of which were built in Vineland and were later known as the Vineland Training School.

He was a delegate at-large to the 1888 Democratic National Convention and in 1892, he was a presidential elector for New Jersey. At the time, New Jersey voted for electors individually, and Baker received the most votes of any candidate for elector that year.

Baker also served as mayor of Wildwood Crest.

== Personal life and death ==
Baker married Lizzie J. Noyes in Vineland on November 21, 1876. Her family was from Baltimore, Maryland. They had seven children, including Curtis T. Baker, who was the presiding judge of the Cape May County courts for one year before his death in 1913. The family were Presbyterian.

Baker was a member of the Poor Richard Club and the Wildwood Crest Yacht Club. In 1902, he represented New Jersey on the board of the Thomas Jefferson Memorial Association.

Baker died at Presbyterian Hospital in Philadelphia on August 18, 1920, after complications from surgery and an illness of several weeks. He was interred beside his son, Curtis Baker, at a cemetery in Cape May Court House.
