= Senator Schenck =

Senator Schenck may refer to:

- Abraham V. Schenck (1821–1902), New Jersey State Senate
- Abraham Schenck (New York senator) (fl. 1790s), New York State Senate
- John I. Schenck (1787–1833), New York State Senate
- William Cortenus Schenck (1773–1821), Ohio State Senate
