= Katharine Baker =

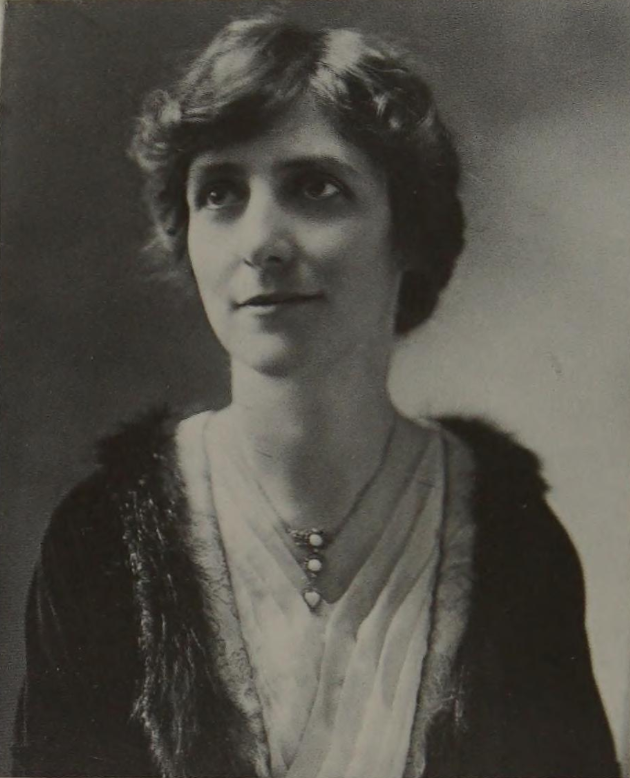
- Born: October 4, 1876; Lewisburg
- Died: September 23, 1919; Saranac Lake
- Father: J. Thompson Baker
- Awards: Croix de guerre 1914–1918

Katharine Pontius Baker (October 4, 1876 – September 23, 1919) was an American short story writer, lawyer, and educator who served in the French Army as a nurse during World War I.

Katharine Baker was born on October 4, 1876 in Lewisburg, Pennsylvania, the daughter of US Representative J. Thompson Baker and Elizabeth Bordner Baker. She attended the Bucknell Female Institute and Goucher College, graduating from the latter in 1896. She read law with her father and passed the bar in 1900. In 1904, her family relocated to Wildwood, New Jersey, where her father became a town founder and its first mayor. In Wildwood, Baker was a school teacher, introduced the Montessori method, and became the first woman elected to serve on the school board of Cape May County, New Jersey in 1912.

Baker wrote a number of short stories for American magazines in the 1910s. Her story "Entertaining the Candidate," based on a visit to her family by Woodrow Wilson, appeared in the Atlantic Monthly in February 1913 and was reprinted in the book Atlantic Classics. Other stories dealt with life in New Jersey, such as "The Rover" in McClure's Magazine in February 1911. Her final story, "Enjoy the Day," was based on her World War I experiences and appeared in Scribner's Magazine in April 1919.

In 1917, Katharine Baker went to France to serve as a nurse during World War I. She enlisted in the French Army as a corporal and joined the 137th Regiment. After serving in hospitals on the front, she herself was hospitalized with pleurisy and pneumonia. After release, instead of taking a lengthy recommended rest, she immediately returned to the front, working for the American Red Cross in Bruyères. Her health shattered by her war experiences, she returned to the United States in 1919. For her work, she was posthumously awarded the Croix de Guerre.

Katharine Baker died on 23 September 1919 in Saranac Lake, New York.

== Bibliography ==
- Her Gentleman Steady, The Scrap Book September 1907
- The Rover, McClure’s Magazine January 1911
- Lizzie and Her Love, The Cavalier March 16, 1912
- The Property Qualification, The Hampton Magazine April 1912
- The Alienist, The Cavalier May 25, 1912
- Culture and the Commissary, Collier’s August 17, 1912
- The Peanut Kid, Harper’s Weekly February 1, 1913
- Entertaining the Candidate, The Atlantic Monthly February 1913
- Amanda, Harper’s Weekly July 12, 1913
- House of Devils, Collier’s July 19, 1913
- For Distinguished Conduct, The Forum January 1914
- Frustrating Henrietta, All-Story Cavalier Weekly July 25, 1914
- The Fire Lady, Ainslee’s September 1914
- The Advertising Agent, Ainslee’s April 1915
- Cinderella Crosses the Rubicon, Ainslee’s October 1915
- A Permanent Fixture, Ainslee’s November 1916
- The Son, Seven Arts November 1916
- A Home for Tatiana, Scribner’s Magazine December 1916
- The Birdman and the Fish Out of Water, Ainslee’s March 1917
- The Fifty-Cent Kind, The Atlantic Monthly April 1917
- Melisande's Garden, Scribner’s Magazine January 1919
- Enjoy the Day, Scribner’s Magazine April 1919
