= Alexander T. McGill =

American politician (1843–1900)

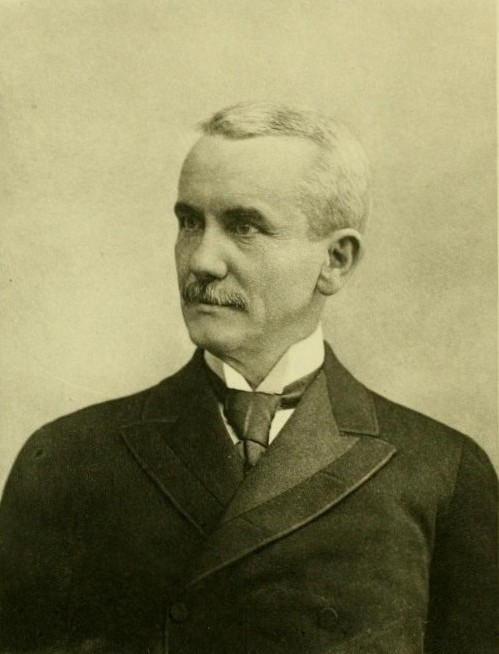
Alexander T. McGill

Alexander Taggart McGill Jr. (October 20, 1843 – April 21, 1900) was an American jurist and Democratic party politician from New Jersey. He served as chancellor of the New Jersey court of chancery from 1887 to 1900 and was the Democratic nominee for Governor of New Jersey in 1895.

== Biography ==
McGill was born in Allegheny City (now part of Pittsburgh), Allegheny County, Pennsylvania. He was the son of Rev. Alexander Taggart McGill and Eleanor Acheson McCulloch. When he was eight, his father was elected to a chair in the Princeton Theological Seminary and the family moved to New Jersey. He attended Princeton University, graduating with an A.B. degree in 1864. After graduating from Columbia Law School with an LL.B. degree in 1866, he continued his legal studies in the Trenton office of Edward W. Scudder. He was admitted to the bar as attorney in 1867 and as counselor in 1870.

McGill moved to Jersey City, New Jersey, where he would remain the rest of his life. From 1870 to 1876, he practiced in partnership with New Jersey Attorney General Robert Gilchrist, Jr. He was elected to the New Jersey General Assembly in 1874 and again in 1875. On June 10, 1875, he married Caroline Stockton Olmsted at Princeton, New Jersey.

In 1878, he was appointed prosecutor of the pleas for Hudson County and was made law judge for the county in 1883. In March 1887, he was named chancellor of the New Jersey court of chancery by Governor Robert Stockton Green, and he was reappointed by Governor George Theodore Werts in 1894. In 1891, he was conferred honorary LL.D. degrees by both Princeton University and Rutgers University.

In 1895, he became the Democratic nominee for Governor of New Jersey. He refused to campaign, however, attending only to his duties as chancellor. He was defeated by the Republican candidate John W. Griggs by a margin of 26,900 votes.

McGill continued to serve as chancellor until his death. He died at his Jersey City home in 1900 at the age of 56. McGill was interred at Princeton Cemetery.

Party political offices
Preceded by George Theodore Werts	Democratic Nominee for Governor of New Jersey; 1895	Succeeded by Elvin W. Crane
