= Mayors of Wildwood, New Jersey =

Wildwood, New Jersey, was incorporated on May 1, 1895, as a borough. and was reincorporated on January 1, 1912, as a city and merged with Holly Beach, New Jersey. It is governed by a three-member commission under the Walsh Act Commission form of municipal government. All three commissioners are elected at-large on a nonpartisan basis to serve concurrent four-year terms of office, with the vote taking place as part of the November general election. At a reorganization conducted after each election, the commission selects one of its members to serve as mayor and gives each commissioner an assigned department to oversee and operate. The mayors were:

== Mayors ==
Mayor	Term	Notes	
Ernest Troiano, Jr.	2011	This was his second term. He was voted out of office in a recall election.	
Gary S. DeMarzo	2009 to 2011		
Ernest Troiano, Jr.	2003 to 2009	This was his first term.	
Duane Sloan	1999 to 2003		
Fred Wager	1995 to 1999		
Edmund J. Grant Jr.	1991 to 1995		
Ralph Sheets	1987 to 1991		
Victor Di Sylvester	1984 to 1987		
Earl B. Ostrander	1983 to 1984	He was voted out of office in a recall election.	
Guy F. Muziani	1972 to 1983		
Charles Masciarella	1968 to 1972		
Ralph G. James	1956 to 1968	He served the longest term, 12 years, as Mayor of Wildwood, New Jersey.	
W. Harry Steele Jr.	1948 to 1956		
George Wagner Krogman Sr.	1945 to 1948	This was his second term.	
Benjamin Charles Ingersoll	1944 to 1945	He was born in Ocean City, New Jersey, and moved to Wildwood with his family when he was three years old. He worked as an undertaker and served as the Coroner of Cape May County, New Jersey. He died in office as mayor on December 6, 1945.	
George Wagner Krogman Sr.	1938 to 1944	This was his first term. He was born on June 7, 1896, in Pennsylvania.	
Doris W. Bradway	1933 to 1938	Doris W. Bradway was the first female mayor for the state of New Jersey. She was a Republican. She was voted out of office in a recall election.	
William H. Bright	1933		
Robert G. Pierpont	1927 to 1933		
Edward Culver	1924 to 1927		
W. Courtwright Smith	1921 to 1924		
Frank E. Smith	1912 to 1920		
Jacob Thompson Baker	1911 to 1912	This was his second term.	Latimer R. Baker, 1895 to 1911.
W. Courtwright Smith	1921 to 1924		
W. C. Hendee	1920 to 1921		
Frank E. Smith	1912 to 1920		
Jacob Thompson Baker	1912	This was his first term. Jacob Thompson Baker was the first mayor of Wildwood, New Jersey under the 1912 consolidation. The consolidation merged Wildwood Borough with Holly Beach City, New Jersey to form Wildwood, New Jersey. He served the shortest term as Mayor of Wildwood, New Jersey, at 11 months, because he was elected to the United States Congress.	
Latimer R. Baker	1895 to 1911	He served during the pre-consolidation as the Mayor of Wildwood Borough, New Jersey which merged with Holly Beach City, New Jersey to form Wildwood, New Jersey.	

== Mayors of Holly Beach City, New Jersey ==
Holly Beach, New Jersey, was incorporated as a borough by an Act of the New Jersey Legislature on April 14, 1885, from portions of Lower Township, based on the results of a referendum held on March 31, 1885. The borough was reincorporated on April 1, 1890, based on a referendum held the previous day. The borough was reincorporated as Holly Beach City on May 4, 1897. On January 1, 1912, the area was included as part of the newly created Wildwood, New Jersey, and the borough was dissolved. The mayors were:

Mayor	Term	Notes
Frank E. Smith	1892 to 1911	Frank E. Smith was the last Mayor of Holly Beach City, New Jersey. In 1911 the town was merged with Wildwood Borough, New Jersey to form Wildwood, New Jersey.
William E. Forcum	1891	This was his second term.
J.B. Osborn	1890	
William E. Forcum	1886 to 1889	This was his first term.
Franklin J. Van Valin	1885	He was killed when he was struck by a train at a railroad crossing. Franklin J. Van Valin was the first Mayor of Holly Beach City, New Jersey.
