= William J. Bradley =

American politician

William James Bradley (born William James Lee Badley, May 5, 1852 – October 13, 1916) was an American patternmaker, engineer, businessman and Republican Party politician who served as Speaker of the New Jersey General Assembly and President of the New Jersey Senate.

== Biography ==
Bradley was born in Sharptown, Maryland, on May 5, 1852, the oldest child of Thomas Dryden Badley and Margaret Matilda Morris. After the Civil War, his family moved to Wilmington, Delaware, and then to Camden, New Jersey. In Camden he worked as a receiver at the Storey Cotton Company. In 1873 he joined the American Dredging Company of Philadelphia as a patternmaker, and rose through the ranks to become Chief Engineer and later General Superintendent of the Camden yards. In 1895 he designed the hydraulic dredge Delaware, and supervised its construction—on time and below budget—in a collaborative effort with the Bucyrus Steam Shovel & Dredge Company. Bradley became president of American Dredging in April 1908 on the death of his predecessor, L. Y. Schermerhorn.

Bradley's political career began in 1892, when he was elected to the Camden City Council. He was also elected to the General Assembly and was re-elected four times. He was named Speaker of the Assembly for the 1901 and 1902 sessions.

In 1902 he was elected to the State Senate, serving three terms for Camden County. He was chosen as President of the Senate in 1905 and 1906. Bradley was one of the few politicians in state history to hold the leadership posts in both the Assembly and the Senate.

In 1911, Bradley diverged from his Republican colleagues, supporting a number of legislative reforms favored by Governor Woodrow Wilson. In retaliation, Republican party leadership defeated his renomination to the Senate.

Bradley died on October 13, 1916, following an emergency operation for uremic poisoning at the Hospital of the University of Pennsylvania in Philadelphia. His widow received the following condolences from President Wilson: "My dear Mrs Bradley, It is with genuine grief that I have heard of the death of your husband. I learned in my association with him at Trenton to respect his character and judgment very deeply, and I feel that in him we have lost a man of high principle and great public usefulness. I felt that I could not deny myself this expression of admiration and deep regret. Cordially and sincerely yours, Woodrow Wilson."

Political offices
Preceded by Benjamin Franklin Jones	Speaker of the New Jersey General Assembly; 1901–1902	Succeeded by John G. Horner
Preceded by Joseph Cross	President of the New Jersey Senate; 1905–1906	Succeeded by Bloomfield H. Minch
