= Benjamin Franklin Jones (New Jersey politician) =

American politician (1869-1935)

Benjamin Franklin Jones (December 31, 1869 – September 26, 1935) was an American jurist and Republican Party politician who served as the Speaker of the New Jersey General Assembly in 1900.

Jones was born in Brooklyn in 1869, the son of Rev. John Jones and Elizabeth Holland. He was educated at Public School 10 and Brooklyn High School. He attended New York University, receiving a Bachelor of Laws degree in 1895 and a Master of Laws degree two years later. He was admitted to the New York bar in 1897.

He then moved to Maplewood, New Jersey, and became involved in Republican politics. In 1899 he was elected to the General Assembly from Essex County. In 1900, at the age of 30, he served as Speaker of the Assembly for one term.

In 1906 Jones was appointed District Court Judge of the city of Orange, serving for five years. Following his retirement from the bench, he was appointed Essex County counsel, serving for three years. He also served as president of the Essex County Tax Board from 1917 to 1920, and during World War I served as a Government Appeal Agent.

From 1925 to 1926, Jones served as the 9th International President of the International Association of Lions Clubs.

Jones married Mabel L. Stevens in Homer, New York on May 17, 1917. They had two children: Benjamin Franklin, Jr., and Mabel Elizabeth.

Jones died at his home in Maplewood in 1935. He was 66.

Political offices
Preceded by David Ogden Watkins	Speaker of the New Jersey General Assembly; 1900	Succeeded by William J. Bradley
