= Elizabeth Alden Curtis Holman =

American writer (1879 - 1939)

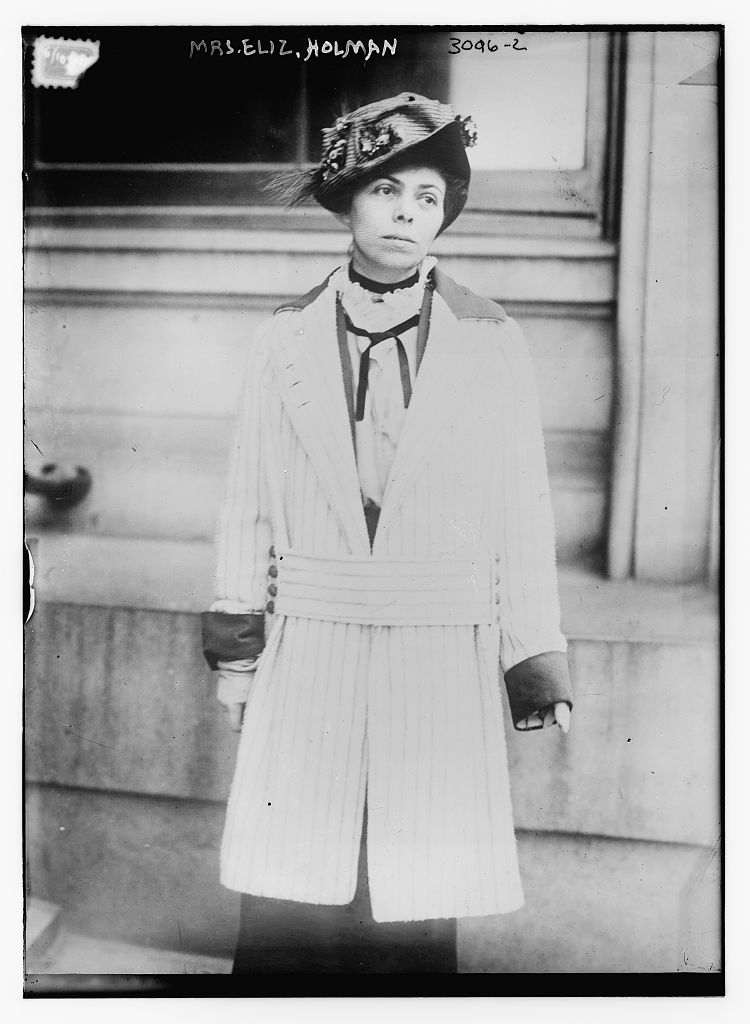

Elizabeth Alden Curtis Holman (c. May 1879 – Nov 9, 1939) was an American writer and artist who was the plaintiff in a 1914 United States Federal Court ruling on forced institutionalization.

== Biography ==
Elizabeth Alden Curtis was born sometime before 21 May 1879, in Hartford, Connecticut, to Dr. Jonathan Strong Curtis, a physician from Epsom, New Hampshire, and his second wife, Susan Brandt. She was the niece of U.S. Attorney General John W. Griggs. On 19 June 1901, she married Cranston Brenton and they had a son Jonathan (but later called William) in 1906 who grew up to be an actor in radio. He drowned in New York City's Hudson River, aged 29.

In September 1912, she was committed involuntarily to the Brattleboro Insane Asylum by her husband and physicians, until she was forced to give her then husband Cranston Brenton a written confession of her alleged infidelity with her future husband Frederic Ernest Holman.

In 1914, she sought $50,000 in damages for her abduction against two Hartford, Connecticut, physicians, Paul Waterman and Oliver C. Smith, and her former husband, the Rev. Cranston Brenton of Yonkers, New York. He was head of the Social Service Commission of the Protestant Episcopal Church in New York State. At trial the long time superintendent of the Brattleboro Retreat, Dr. Shaller E. Lawton, testified that Holman was "morally and mentally impaired." However, lawyers produced documents from the divorce proceedings of Reverend Brenton that contradicted the statements of Lawton, creating shock in the courtroom.

She won $4,000 (equivalent to $129,000 in 2025) in damages and her costs against Branston and Waterman.

In April 1913, she married Frederic Ernest Holman, an accountant, following her divorce from Brenton, who retained custody of their son, William. Frederic Holman died in January 1922 in Norway, Maine, soon after the couple moved there.

In 1923, she married Martin Sylvester Tidd, an insurance businessman from Boston. They lived in Maine for several years. By 1930, Curtis was widowed for the second time and moved back to Connecticut, where she reverted to using her maiden name. She died on November 9, 1939, in Stamford, Connecticut.

== Writing ==
Elizabeth Alden Curtis Holman was also a writer, publishing under various names depending on her marital status. In 1900, she's mentioned in a The Nation magazine article as an American poet working on a "thoughtful, pure, and even pleasing" version of the Rubaiyat. As "Elizabeth Curtis Brenton," she had letters that appeared in The New York Times Saturday Review of Books in 1901 and 1905. In 1902 she published a version of The Lament of Baba Tahir, a Persian text, under the name Elizabeth Curtis Brenton; in 1912, E. A. Curtis and F. E. Holman (not yet married) filed for copyright for a play she wrote, based on Alice in Wonderland. Also in 1912, she published a play called The Norseman. She also published poetry in the Connecticut magazine The Crisis, and other literary periodicals.

== Bibliography ==
- Bābā-Ṭāhir, Edward Heron-Allen, and Elizabeth A. Curtis. The Lament of Baba Tahir: Being the Ruba'iyat of Baba Tahir, Hamadani ('uryan) the Persian Text Ed., Annotated and Tr. by Edward Heron-Allen, and Rendered into English Verse by Elizabeth Curtis Brenton. London: B. Quaritch, 1902.
- Curtis, Elizabeth A. The Norseman; a Drama in Four Acts, by Elizabeth Alden Curtis. Portland, Me., The Mosher Press, 1912.
- Omar, Khayyam, and Elizabeth A. Curtis. One Hundred Quatrains from the Rubáiyát of Omar Khayyám: A Rendering in English Verse. Gouverneur, N.Y: Brothers of the Book, 1899.
