= John J. Gardner =

American politician

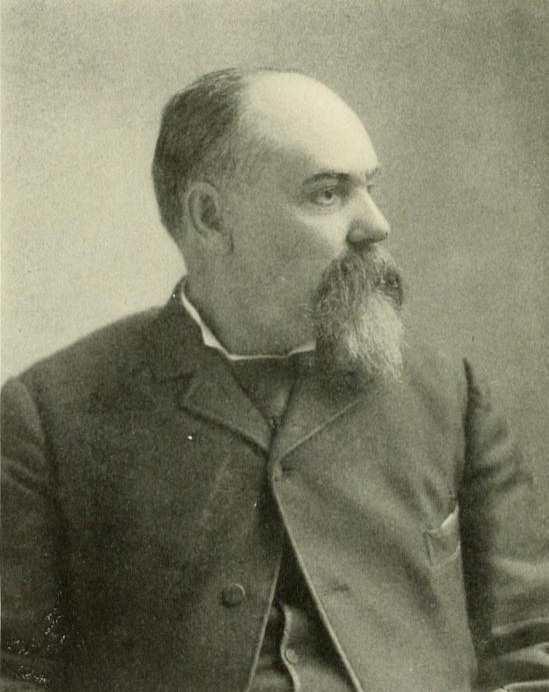

Member of the U.S. House of Representatives from New Jersey's 2nd district
- In office March 4, 1893 – March 3, 1913
- Preceded by: James Buchanan
- Succeeded by: J. Thompson Baker

Member of the New Jersey Senate from Atlantic County
- In office 1878–1893
- Preceded by: Hosea F. Madden
- Succeeded by: Samuel D. Hoffman

Mayor of Atlantic City, New Jersey
- In office 1868–1872
- Preceded by: Lemuel G. Eldridge
- Succeeded by: Charles Souder
- In office 1874–1875
- Preceded by: Charles Souder
- Succeeded by: Willard Wright

Personal details
- Born: John James Gardner; October 17, 1845 Atlantic County, New Jersey, U.S.
- Died: February 7, 1921 (aged 75) Indian Mills, New Jersey, U.S.
- Resting place: Atlantic City Cemetery in Pleasantville, New Jersey
- Party: Republican
- Education: University of Michigan
- Profession: Politician

John James Gardner (October 17, 1845 – February 7, 1921) was an American businessman,Civil War veteran, Republican Party politician and statesman who represented Atlantic County, New Jersey in the New Jersey Senate from 1878 to 1893 and United States House of Representatives (as the representative for New Jersey's 2nd congressional district) from 1893 to 1913. He was also mayor of Atlantic City, New Jersey.

At the time of his election to Congress, Gardner was the longest serving member in the history of the New Jersey Senate, having represented Atlantic County for five consecutive terms from 1878 to 1893. He was widely considered one of the most powerful legislators in New Jersey history and known for his caustic and aggressive manner.

== Early life and career ==
John James Gardner was born on October 17, 1845 in Atlantic County, New Jersey to John and Jane Gardner.

Gardner spent most of his life in Atlantic City and attended the common schools there. He was raised to be a water man until 1861, when he enlisted in the 6th New Jersey Volunteer Infantry during the American Civil War. Following the war, he re-enlisted for one year with the United States Veteran Volunteers.

He attended the University of Michigan Law School in 1866 and 1867. He engaged in the real estate and insurance business. At one time, he worked as a newspaper editorialist and was widely quoted.

== Political career ==
Gardner was elected as an alderman in Atlantic City in 1867. He served as mayor of Atlantic City on three separate occasions: 1868 to 1870, 1873 to 1874 and 1876. He served as member of the common council and coroner of Atlantic County in 1876.

=== New Jersey Senate (1878–93) ===
He was a member of the New Jersey Senate from 1878 to 1893, serving as its president in 1883. During his long term as senator, Gardner became most famous as the chair of the investigating committee established following the 1883 New Jersey gubernatorial election. His committee, led by committee counsel William H. Corbin, uncovered a vast electoral fraud conspiracy in Hudson County favoring the Democratic nominee and eventual winner, Leon Abbett. After a lengthy trial which involved alleged jury tampering, the investigation resulted in the conviction and imprisonment of sixty-four local election officials.

Gardner was a delegate to the 1884 Republican National Convention. He was a consistent leader in the Republican Party and at its state conventions for more than a quarter of a century.

=== U.S. House of Representatives (1893–1913) ===
In 1892, Gardner was elected as a Republican to the United States House of Representatives, representing New Jersey's 2nd congressional district. He served in the 53rd through 62nd Congresses, from March 1893 until March 1913. He was defeated for reelection in 1912 and resumed agricultural pursuits.

As a representative, Gardner preferred to focus on drafting and passing legislation rather than the investigative abilities he had been known for in the New Jersey legislature. He served as chairman of the Committee on Labor, and in 1898, speaker Thomas Brackett Reed appointed him to the United States Industrial Commission, which sought to adjudicate between capital and labor. He was the author of legislation regulating penal labor and establishing a national eight-hour workday.

He also served on the Committee on the Post Office for the entirety of his time in Congress, and he served for three years on the commission to investigate the postal service that led to a number of reforms. Gardner was the primary author of a law creating postal savings banks, as well as laws framing governmental rentals of postal facilities from railroads.

He was also a supporter of legislation to improve the rivers and harbors of New Jersey, including Raccoon Creek in his district, for which he delivered a ten-minute speech. He also secured federal improvements to the Maurice River, Mantua River, Tuckerton Creek, Absecon Creek, Rancocas Inlet, and Absecon Inlet in his district. Working with Senator Frank O. Briggs, he secured improvement of the Delaware River between Trenton and Philadelphia.

Following the death of William J. Sewell in 1901, Gardner was a candidate for Sewell's vacant United States Senate seat. However, the party nomination went to John F. Dryden.

==== Views ====
Gardner consistently supported agricultural interests and opposed the reciprocity treaty proposed by President William Howard Taft. His success in establishing postal savings banks led him to support land banking, and he was working on legislation to that end when he was defeated in 1912.

From his position on the Committee on the Post Office, Gardner defended the American postal system at length following Joseph L. Bristow's 1903 report on postal fraud. On another occasion, he delivered an hours-long speech comparing it positively to the Canadian postal service.

In April 1898, Gardner was among the six representatives who voted against the declaration of war on Spain. Despite this, he sought to resign from Congress to seek a commission in the United States military. His request was rendered unnecessary when the United States won a relatively quick and easy victory.

== Personal life and death ==
Gardner married Mittie Scull on February 1, 1873 in Philadelphia. They had six children; by 1917, only two survived: Josephine Scull Gardner and Thomas Kemble Reed Gardner. Outside of politics, Gardner was a farmer for most of his life; in retirement, he farmed more than 500 acres of land.

He died of heart disease at his farm in Indian Mills in Shamong Township, New Jersey on February 7, 1921, and was interred in Atlantic City Cemetery in Pleasantville, New Jersey.

Political offices
Preceded by Lemuel C. Eldridge	Mayor of Atlantic City; 1868–1872	Succeeded by Charles Souder
Preceded by Charles Souder	Mayor of Atlantic City; 1874–1875	Succeeded by Willard Wright
Preceded by Garret Hobart	President of the New Jersey Senate; 1883	Succeeded by Benjamin A. Vail
U.S. House of Representatives
Preceded by James Buchanan	Member of the U.S. House of Representatives from New Jersey's 2nd congressional district 1893–1913	Succeeded by J. Thompson Baker
