= Foster McGowan Voorhees =

American politician (1856-1927)

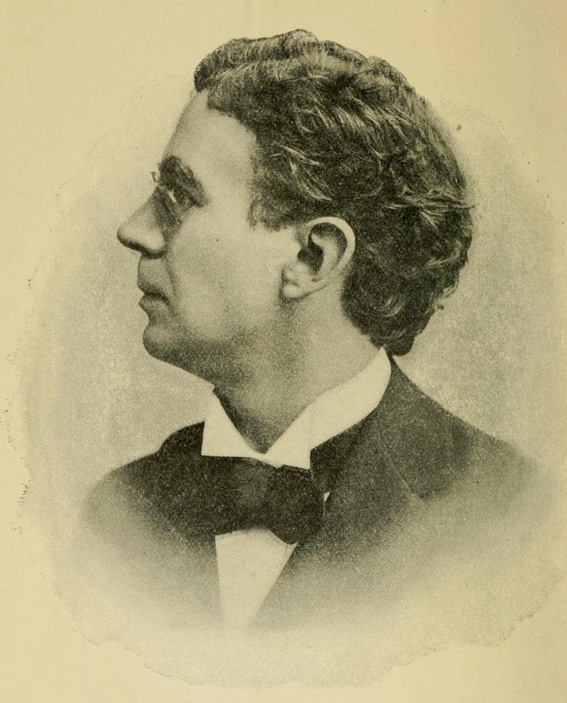

30th Governor of New Jersey
- In office Acting; February 1, 1898 – October 18, 1898
- Preceded by: John W. Griggs
- Succeeded by: David Ogden Watkins (acting)
- In office January 17, 1899 – January 21, 1902
- Preceded by: David Ogden Watkins (acting)
- Succeeded by: Franklin Murphy

Member of the New Jersey Senate from Union County
- In office 1894–1899
- Preceded by: Frederick C. Marsh
- Succeeded by: Joseph Cross

Personal details
- Born: November 5, 1856 Clinton, New Jersey, U.S.
- Died: June 14, 1927 (aged 70) High Bridge, New Jersey, U.S.
- Party: Republican
- Education: Rutgers University

Foster McGowan Voorhees (November 5, 1856 – June 14, 1927) was an American Republican Party politician, who served as the 30th governor of New Jersey from 1899 to 1902.

== Biography ==
Voorhees represented Union County in the New Jersey Senate from 1895 to 1898. As President of the Senate, he became acting governor briefly in 1898 when John W. Griggs resigned to become the Attorney General of the United States and again as an elected governor from 1899 to 1902. He was a New Jersey delegate to the 1900 Republican National Convention in Philadelphia, Pennsylvania. He died of chronic myocarditis on his farm in High Bridge, New Jersey and was interred at Riverside Cemetery in Clinton, New Jersey. Voorhees was of Dutch descent.

== Legacy ==
New Jersey's Voorhees Township, Voorhees High School, Voorhees dorm at Rutgers and Voorhees State Park, his former farm, are named in his honor.

== See also ==
- List of governors of New Jersey

Political offices
Preceded by Robert Williams	President of the New Jersey Senate; 1898	Succeeded by William H. Skirm
Preceded by John W. Griggs; Governor	Acting Governor of New Jersey; February 1, 1898 – October 18, 1898	Succeeded by David Ogden Watkins; Acting Governor
Preceded by David Ogden Watkins; Acting Governor	Governor of New Jersey; January 17, 1899 – January 21, 1902	Succeeded by Franklin Murphy
Party political offices
Preceded by John W. Griggs	Republican Nominee for Governor of New Jersey; 1898	Succeeded by Franklin Murphy
