= David Ogden Watkins =

American politician

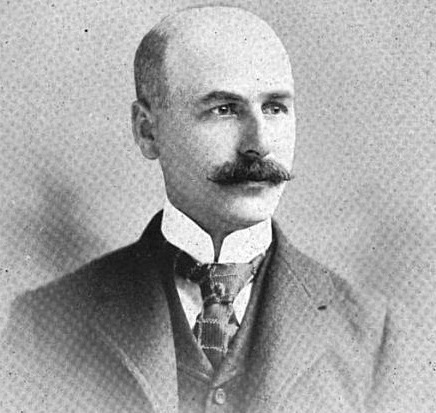

United States Attorney for the District of New Jersey
- In office 1900–1903
- President: William McKinley
- Preceded by: J. Kearny Rice
- Succeeded by: Cortlandt Parker Jr.

Speaker of the New Jersey General Assembly
- In office 1898–1899
- Preceded by: George W. MacPherson
- Succeeded by: Benjamin Franklin Jones

Acting Governor of New Jersey
- In office October 18, 1898 – January 17, 1899
- Preceded by: Foster McGowan Voorhees
- Succeeded by: Foster McGowan Voorhees

Member of the New Jersey General Assembly
- In office 1887–1899

Personal details
- Born: David Ogden Watkins; June 8, 1862 Woodbury, New Jersey, U.S.
- Died: June 20, 1938 (aged 76)
- Party: Republican

David Ogden Watkins (June 8, 1862 – June 20, 1938) was the acting governor of New Jersey from 1898 to 1899.

== Biography ==
Watkins was born in Woodbury, New Jersey. He studied law and was admitted to practice in New Jersey in 1893. Watkins' first political foray was mayor of Woodbury, New Jersey, from 1886 to 1890. He later served on the Woodbury City Council from 1892 to 1898, and as president of the council from 1895 to 1897. He served in the New Jersey General Assembly from 1887 to 1899 as a Republican. On October 18, 1898, Governor Foster MacGowan Voorhees resigned from office, and Watkins become acting governor in his capacity as Speaker of the New Jersey State Assembly, Serving until January 16, 1899, when Voorhees returned as governor. From 1900 to 1903 he served as the U.S. Attorney for the District of New Jersey and from 1903 to 1909 he was the state's Commissioner of Banking and Insurance.

He died on June 20, 1938, twelve days after his 76th birthday. He was buried in Green Cemetery in Woodbury.

== See also ==
- David Ogden Watkins entry at The Political Graveyard

Legal offices
Preceded by J. Kearny Rice	United States Attorney for the District of New Jersey; 1900-1903	Succeeded by Cortlandt Parker Jr.
Political offices
Preceded by George W. MacPherson	Speaker of the New Jersey General Assembly; 1898-1899	Succeeded by Benjamin Franklin Jones
Preceded by Foster McGowan Voorhees; Acting Governor	Acting Governor of New Jersey; October 18, 1898 – January 16, 1899	Succeeded by Foster McGowan Voorhees; Governor
