= Cowan, Pennsylvania =

Populated place in Pennsylvania, United States

Coordinates: 40°57′27″N 77°00′49″W

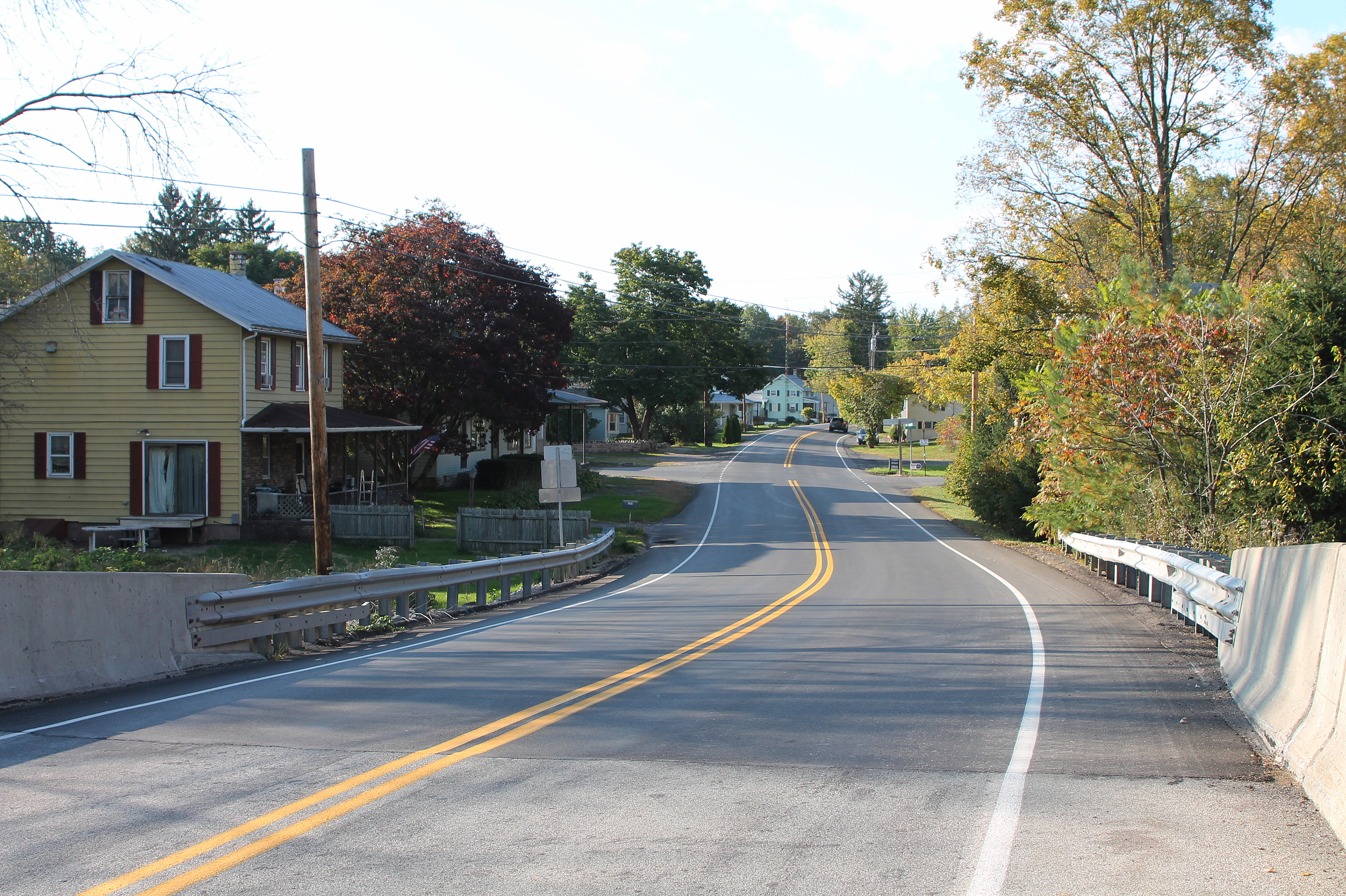
Pennsylvania Route 192 in Cowan

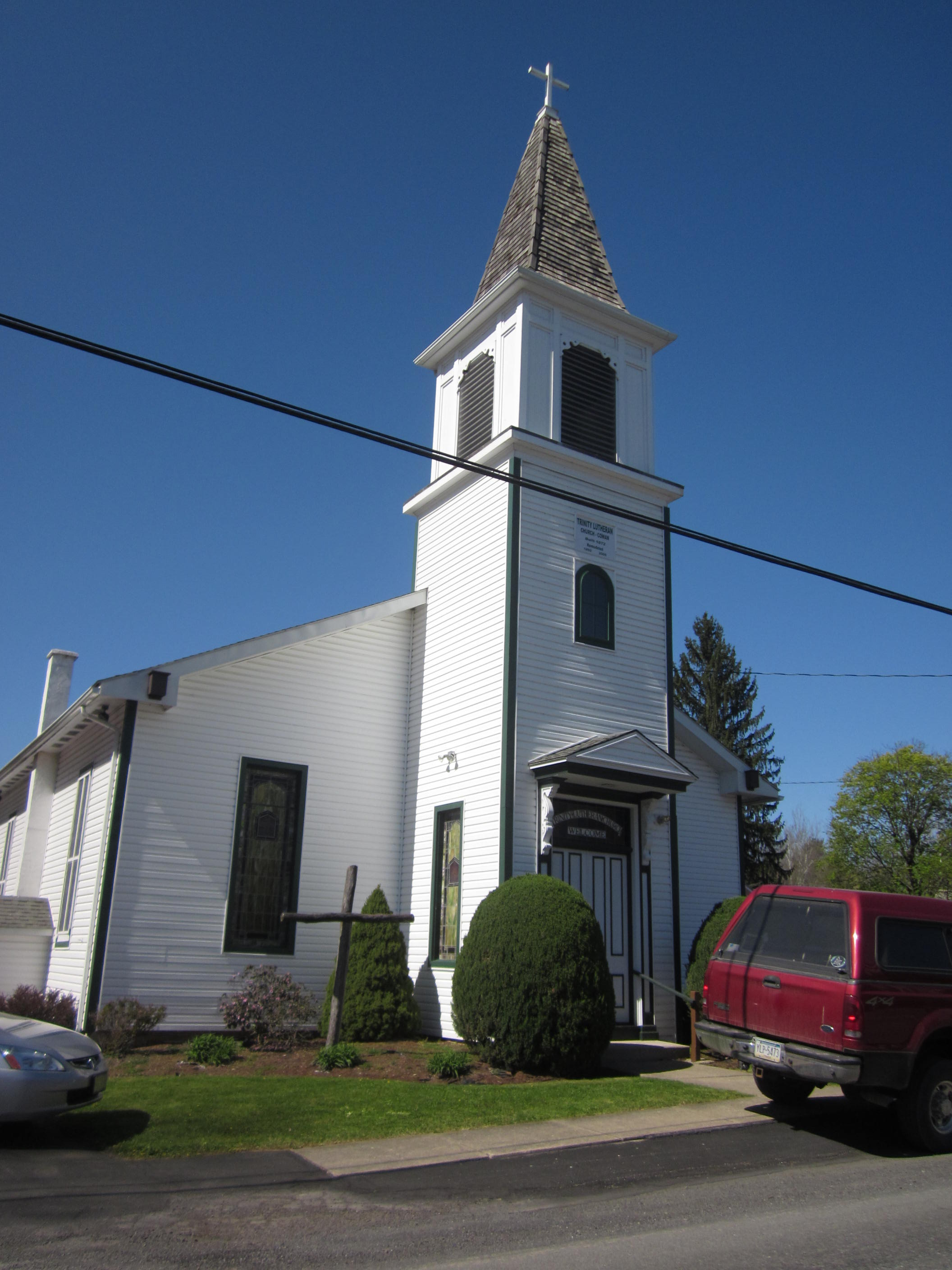
Trinity Lutheran Church

Cowan is a populated place in Buffalo Township, Union County, Pennsylvania, United States. Notable institutions in Cowan include Bucknell University's Forrest D. Brown Conference Center.

== History ==
In the 1860s, Cowan was known as Farmersville. Trinity Lutheran Church was founded in 1871. Cowan was named after the Loyalist John Samuel Cowan who, in 1785, obtained a warrant for the land from the Proprietors of Pennsylvania.
