= Abraham V. Schenck =

American politician

Abraham Voorhees Schenck (October 12, 1821 – April 28, 1902) was an American lawyer and Republican Party politician who served as President of the New Jersey Senate and Mayor of New Brunswick, New Jersey.

== Biography ==
Schenck was born in New Brunswick, New Jersey, on October 12, 1821, to Henry Harris Schenck and Eva Voorhees. He was educated in New Brunswick public schools and studied law with Henry V. Speer. He was admitted to the New Jersey bar as an attorney in 1843 and as a counsellor in 1847. In 1851 he was elected Mayor of New Brunswick.

Schenck married Emily Wines Barker on February 12, 1863, and they had two children: Emily Barker Schenck and Warren Redcliffe Schenck. After his wife's death he married her sister Sarah Estelle Barker on October 17, 1872, and they had three children: Grace Wines Schenck, Edith Mercer Schenck, and Arthur Van Voorhees Schenck.

In 1872, Governor Joel Parker appointed Schenck as Prosecutor of the Pleas for Middlesex County. He served in the position until 1877.

Schenck was elected to the New Jersey Senate in 1882, serving for three years. In 1885 he was selected as Senate President over John W. Griggs. He was not renominated at the end of his term and returned to his legal practice in New Brunswick.

In 1902, Schenck died at Redcliffe, his residence in Highland Park.

Political offices
Preceded by Benjamin A. Vail	President of the New Jersey Senate; 1885	Succeeded by John W. Griggs
