= John W. Griggs =

American lawyer and politician (1849–1927)

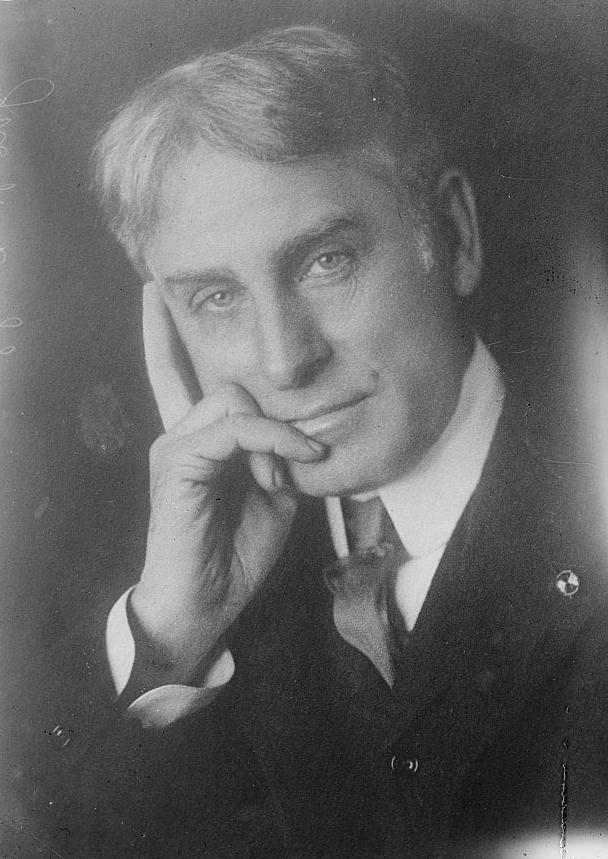
- Griggs, c. 1920

43rd United States Attorney General
- In office January 25, 1898 – March 29, 1901
- President: William McKinley
- Preceded by: Joseph McKenna
- Succeeded by: Philander C. Knox

29th Governor of New Jersey
- In office January 21, 1896 – January 31, 1898
- Preceded by: George Werts
- Succeeded by: Foster McGowan Voorhees (acting)

Member of the New Jersey Senate from Passaic County
- In office January 9, 1883 – 1889
- Preceded by: Garret Hobart
- Succeeded by: John Mallon

Member of the Paterson City Council
- In office 1879–1882

Member of the New Jersey House of Representatives
- In office 1875–1876

Personal details
- Born: John William Griggs; July 10, 1849 Newton, New Jersey, U.S.
- Died: November 28, 1927 (aged 78) Paterson, New Jersey, U.S.
- Party: Republican
- Spouse(s): Carolyn Webster Brandt; Laura Price
- Education: Lafayette College (BA)

John William Griggs (July 10, 1849 – November 28, 1927) was an American lawyer and Republican Party politician who served as the 29th Governor of New Jersey from 1896 to 1898 and the 43rd United States Attorney General from 1898 to 1901.

As Governor, Griggs gained a reputation for siding with "the little guy" in conflicts between impoverished workers and their employers; he was also an advocate of civil rights for African Americans.

== Early life ==
John William Griggs was born on July 10, 1849, on his family's farm on Ridge Road near Newton, New Jersey to Daniel and Emeline Johnson Griggs. The Griggs family had settled in the state around 1733 and had been a farming family since.

John Griggs attended the Collegiate Institute in Newton before enrolling at Lafayette College in 1864. Though he participated in an unruly protest against the abolition of fraternities on campus (as a member of Theta Delta Chi), Griggs graduated as scheduled in 1868. He returned to Newton and studied law as a clerk in the office of Robert Hamilton for three years, before spending the final months of his apprenticeship in the offices of Socrates Tuttle of Paterson. Tuttle, a prominent local Republican, would soon be elected mayor of the city and had also mentored another young Republican attorney, Garret Hobart, who became Tuttle's son-in-law. Hobart and Griggs began a political friendship which would eventually take both men to Washington.

In November 1871, Griggs received his law license. After two years of independent practice, he entered a partnership with Tuttle and by 1879 had developed a large clientele of his own. Future New Jersey Attorney General Robert H. McCarter praised Griggs as an excellent mediator, known for his "wonderful power of clearing up difficulties that arose in the course of protracted trials."

== State politics (1875–96) ==
Griggs entered politics in 1875 as a Republican candidate for the New Jersey General Assembly from Paterson. He narrowly unseated the Democratic incumbent with 51.9 percent of the vote and became the youngest member of the Assembly at just twenty-six years old. Despite his age, he was appointed to several committees and played a key role in drafting the election laws under a recently approved set of constitutional amendments. He was re-elected in 1876 but defeated for a third term in 1877, which was generally a Democratic year.

Having been turned out of the legislature, Griggs cultivated his legal practice and served as a government attorney. From 1878 to 1879, he was counsel to the Passaic County Board of Chosen Freeholders and from 1879 to 1882, he was city counsel for Paterson.

In 1882, Griggs returned to Trenton by succeeding Garret Hobart as State Senator. He won a narrow election over James Inglis Jr., a local judge, by 182 votes. In the Senate, Griggs chaired eight regular committees in six years, including Railroads, Canals and Turnpikes and Revision and Amendment of the Laws. As Senator, his chief achievement came in 1884 when he chaired a joint committee on corporate taxation. He heavily revised the proposal by Governor Leon Abbett to be less punitive, and his bill became law and survived judicial scrutiny. Riding this wave of success, Griggs stood for President of the Senate in 1885 but lost to Abraham V. Schenck. He was elected to succeed Schenck in 1886, furthering his statewide profile and ambitions.

In 1888, Griggs was a delegate-at-large to the Republican National Convention from New Jersey, as part of a slate supporting favorite son William Walter Phelps. After Benjamin Harrison won the nomination, Griggs delivered the speech nominating Phelps for Vice President; he finished second behind Levi P. Morton of New York.

Though Griggs hoped to be nominated for Governor in 1889 on the basis of his taxation bill, he found little support for his candidacy. President Harrison seriously considered nominating him to the Supreme Court in 1892 to succeed fellow New Jerseyan Joseph P. Bradley. Griggs lobbied for the seat through his friend Hobart (by then serving as Senate President himself) and others but did not receive the nomination, which instead went to George Shiras Jr.

== Governor of New Jersey (1896–98) ==
=== 1895 election ===
In 1895, Griggs ran an active campaign for Governor. He received the Republican nomination at the party convention on the third ballot over Representative John Kean, who had taken the nomination in 1892.

In the general election, Griggs campaigned on a platform for "honesty, retrenchment, and reform." He charged the Democratic Party and nominee Alexander T. McGill of Jersey City with eleven years of corruption and voter fraud. He also criticized recent Democratic legislation, including a Coal Combine bill and legalized racetrack gambling. He spoke infrequently on national issues, but opposed free silver, free trade, and Chinese immigration. Disaffection with the Democratic Party in the state and the party's growing opposition to the gold standard nationally paved the way for Griggs's solid victory; he was the first Republican elected as Governor since Marcus Lawrence Ward thirty years earlier in 1865, when the party still ran under the National Union label in New Jersey. His victory was the first of five consecutive wins for the party.

=== Term in office ===
Griggs held his inauguration in a formal affair at Taylor's Opera House on June 21, 1896. In his speech, he called for "a restriction in the volume of legislation," especially the growing trend of municipal incorporation, and reforms protecting citizens against injuries from trolley cars and urban sewer pollution.

As he had during the election campaign, Griggs called for depoliticization of charitable and penal institutions. He opened his term in office by removing many Democratic state officials from office, including longtime Secretary of State Henry C. Kelsey and Attorney General John P. Stockton, who had each served for decades under Democratic governors, and many "lay judges" of the courts of common pleas. On March 19, 1896, Senator Foster McGowan Voorhees introduced a bill to eliminate the courts of common pleas and reduce the pay for county court judges, which Griggs later signed into law.

Griggs also signed bills eliminating grade crossings in Newark and Jersey City and preventing water pollution.

== U.S. Attorney General (1898–1901) ==
In 1898, Griggs was offered the position of United States Attorney General by William McKinley. His appointment came at the recommendation of Hobart, his political mentor and now the Vice President of the United States. Griggs had been a longtime McKinley supporter, speaking on behalf of the candidate at the first McKinley for President club in the country in April 1896.

As Attorney General, Griggs's chief achievement was arguing the Insular Cases before the Supreme Court, which determined the constitutional status of the lands won in the Spanish–American War. Griggs was an ardent supporter of the President's imperial policy and had accompanied McKinley and Hobart to Cuba, where they visited Theodore Roosevelt following his victory at the Battle of San Juan Hill. In the Insular Cases, he leaned heavily on Justice Bradley's decision in Late Corp. of the Church of Jesus Christ of Latter-Day Saints v. United States to advance a national view of the Constitution.

After McKinley's assassination in 1901, Griggs resigned from the cabinet. In December of that year, Senator William J. Sewell died in office. Griggs was put forward as a leading candidate to succeed him, but the legislature ultimately elected John F. Dryden.

== Return to private life ==
Griggs was one of the first members appointed to the Permanent Court of Arbitration at the Hague, and served from 1901 to 1912. He also returned to private legal practice, founding the corporate firm of Griggs, Dill and Harding in New York City.

When the Consolidated National Bank of New York was organized on July 1, 1902, the fourteen directors included Griggs, Henry C. Brewster, George Crocker, Mortimer H. Wagar, and Perry Belmont. In 1905 he was named the president of the Marconi Wireless Telegraph Company of America, and held that office until the company was reorganized as the Radio Corporation of America (RCA) in 1919. He was present during the United States Senate inquiry into the sinking of the Titanic as a representative of the Marconi Company. At RCA he was a director and the company's general counsel until his death.

== Personal life and death ==
Griggs married Carolyn Webster Brandt in 1874 and Laura Elizabeth Price in 1893. He had seven children.

Griggs's niece Elizabeth Alden Curtis Holman was the plaintiff in a 1914 case in United States federal court which successfully challenged forced institutionalization.

Griggs was a trustee to his alma mater, Lafayette College, from 1894 to 1900.

Griggs died on November 28, 1927, in Paterson, New Jersey. He was buried at Cedar Lawn Cemetery in that city.

== Honors ==
Griggs Avenue in Teaneck, New Jersey, bears his name.

Political offices
| Preceded by Abraham V. Schenck | President of the New Jersey Senate; 1886 | Succeeded by Fred Fish |
| Preceded by George Werts | Governor of New Jersey; 1896–1898 | Succeeded by Foster McGowan Voorhees; Acting |
Party political offices
| Preceded by John Kean | Republican nominee for Governor of New Jersey; 1895 | Succeeded by Foster McGowan Voorhees |
Legal offices
| Preceded by Joseph McKenna | United States Attorney General; 1898–1901 | Succeeded by Philander C. Knox |
