= List of people from South Orange, New Jersey =

Notable current and former residents of South Orange, New Jersey include:

- Platt Adams (1885–1961), athlete who won a gold medal in the standing high jump and a silver medal in the standing long jump at the 1912 Summer Olympics in Stockholm
- Jessica Antiles (born 1996), competitive swimmer
- Mark Armstrong, college basketball player for the Villanova Wildcats
- Paul Auster (1947–2024), author known for works blending absurdism and crime fiction
- Olivia Baker (born 1996), middle-distance runner who specializes in the 800 meters
- Louis Bamberger (1855–1944), department store founder and philanthropist
- Jane Barus (1892–1977), member of the Constitutional convention that formulated the 1947 New Jersey State Constitution
- Kelly Bishop (born 1944), actress, current resident
- Ken Bloom, particle physicist
- Bisa Butler (born 1973), fiber artist known for her quilted portraits and designs celebrating black life
- Joshua Braff (born 1967), novelist
- Zach Braff (born 1975), actor on the TV series Scrubs; writer and director of the movie Garden State
- Andre Braugher (1962–2023), actor
- Chris Broussard (born 1968), sports analyst for ESPN, current resident
- Chris Browne (born 1952), cartoonist, Hägar the Horrible
- Mark Bryant (born 1965), former NBA player
- Gerardo Catena (1902–2000), mobster
- Tom Courtney (1933–2023), athlete and winner of two gold medals in the 1956 Summer Olympics
- Jonah David (born 1977), drummer/percussionist
- James Delany (born 1948), commissioner of the Big Ten Conference
- Joetta Clark Diggs (born 1962), retired track and field champion, specializing in middle distance running
- John Dossett (born 1958), actor, current resident
- John B. Duff (1931–2013), historian who served as the 8th President of Columbia College Chicago
- Walter Dukes (1930–2001), center who played in the NBA for the New York Knicks, Minneapolis Lakers and Detroit Pistons
- Asher Brown Durand (1796–1886), painter
- Roy Eisenhardt (born 1939), lawyer and former president of the Oakland Athletics
- John Franklin Fort (1852–1920), 33rd Governor of New Jersey, 1908–1911
- Felix Fuld (1868–1929), co-founder of the L. Bamberger & Company department store
- Jared Gilman (born 1998), actor who appeared in the film Moonrise Kingdom
- Kai Greene (born 1993), soccer player for Rio Grande Valley FC Toros in the United Soccer League
- Avrum Gross (1936–2018), lawyer who served as the Attorney General of Alaska from 1974 through 1980
- Benedict Gross (1950–2025), mathematics professor
- Bessie Pease Gutmann (1876–1960), artist and illustrator
- Ronnie Hickman, American football safety who played college football at Ohio State
- Isaiah Hill (born 2002), model and actor, known for his role as Jace Carson in the Apple TV+ series Swagger, a character loosely based on Kevin Durant
- Lauryn Hill (born 1975), musician, solo and with The Fugees
- Jerome Hines (1921–2003), opera singer with the Metropolitan Opera
- Alberto Ibargüen (born 1944), President and CEO of the John S. and James L. Knight Foundation and former publisher of The Miami Herald
- Andrew Jacobs, journalist for The New York Times, documentary film director and producer
- Wyclef Jean (born 1969), member of The Fugees
- Hallett Johnson (1888–1968), career diplomat who served as the United States Ambassador to Costa Rica
- James Kaplan (born 1951), novelist
- Peter W. Kaplan (1954–2013), newspaper editor best known for his 15-year-long stint as Editor-In-Chief of The New York Observer
- Stacey Kent (born 1968), singer and recording artist Blue Note Records
- Alfred Kinsey (1894–1956), sex researcher, who moved to the town in 1904
- Robert Kirsch (born 1965/1966), state court judge from New Jersey who is a nominee to serve as a United States district judge of the United States District Court for the District of New Jersey
- Jessica Kirson, stand-up comedian and producer
- Michael Lally (born 1942), poet and author
- Frank Langella (born 1938), actor
- Lee Leonard (1929–2018), journalist, current resident, husband of Kelly Bishop
- David Levin (1948–2017), balloonist, who is the only person to have completed the "triple crown" by winning the World Gas Balloon Championship, the World Hot Air Ballooning Championships and the Gordon Bennett Cup
- William Lowell Sr. (1863–1954), dentist and an inventor of a wooden golf tee patented in 1921
- Selah Marley (born 1998), fashion model and singer
- Joe Martinez (born 1983), Major League Baseball pitcher who has played for the San Francisco Giants, Cleveland Indians and Arizona Diamondbacks
- Elmer Matthews (1927–2015), lawyer and politician who served three terms in the New Jersey General Assembly
- Sean McCourt (born 1971), Broadway actor
- Walter I. McCoy (1859–1933), represented New Jersey's 8th congressional district, 1911–1913, and the 9th district, 1913–1914; village trustee 1893–1895, 1901–1905, and in 1910
- Roderick Fletcher Mead (1900–1971), painter best known for his engravings
- T. S. Monk (born 1949), jazz musician
- Charles Murray (born 1968), retired boxer who boxed at light welterweight
- Micol Ostow (born 1976), author, editor and educator
- Michele Pawk (born 1961), actor
- Thomas J. Preston, Jr. (1862–1955), professor of archeology at Princeton University; married Frances Cleveland, widow of President Grover Cleveland
- James Rebhorn (1948–2014), actor whose films include Independence Day and Meet the Parents
- Marc Roberts (born 1959), entrepreneur, sports manager, real estate developer and businessman
- Don Rogers (born 1936), former NFL and AFL offensive lineman
- Alan Sagner (1920–2018), politician, businessman and philanthropist who served as New Jersey Commissioner of Transportation, as Chairman of the Port Authority of New York and New Jersey, and as Chairman of the Corporation for Public Broadcasting
- David M. Satz Jr. (1926–2009), attorney who served as U.S. Attorney for the District of New Jersey from 1961 to 1969
- Joseph Scheuerle (1873–1948), painter and illustrator best known for his portraits of Native Americans
- Peter Shapiro (born 1952), financial services executive and former politician who was the youngest person ever elected to the New Jersey General Assembly and went on to serve as Essex County Executive
- Andrew Shue (born 1967), actor; co-founder of CafeMom
- Elisabeth Shue (born 1963), actress
- Joel Silver (born 1952), director and producer
- Kiki Smith (born 1954), artist
- Michael Peter Smith (1941–2020), singer-songwriter
- Seton Smith (born 1955), artist and photographer
- Tony Smith (1912–1980), sculptor
- Kevin Spacey (born 1959), actor
- Edwin Stern (born 1941), lawyer and judge who served as acting justice on the New Jersey Supreme Court
- Mason Toye (born 1998), soccer player
- Jeff Van Note (born 1946), former Atlanta Falcons player and Georgia Tech broadcaster
- Jeffrey Vanderbeek, owner of the New Jersey Devils
- Max Weinberg (born 1951), drummer for E-Street Band and Late Night with Conan O'Brien
- Lonnie Wright (1944–2012), professional basketball and football player; played in the same season for the Denver Rockets of the American Basketball Association and the Denver Broncos of the American Football League before switching to basketball on a full-time basis
- Aaron D. Wyner (1939–1997), information theorist noted for his contributions in coding theory
- Strauss Zelnick (born 1957), businessman and lawyer who is the former chairman of media conglomerate CBS Corporation
