= Columbia High School (New Jersey) =

High school in Essex County, New Jersey, US

Location
- 17 Parker Avenue; Maplewood, Essex County, New Jersey 07040; United States; 40°44′08″N 74°15′58″W

Information
- Type: Public high school
- Motto: "Excelsior"
- Established: 1814; 212 years ago 1885
- School district: South Orange-Maplewood School District
- NCES School ID: 341533002422
- Principal: Frank Sanchez
- Faculty: 139.5 FTEs
- Grades: 9−12
- Enrollment: 1,985 (as of 2024–25)
- Student to teacher ratio: 14.2:1
- Campus type: Suburban
- Colors: Red and Black
- Athletics conference: Super Essex Conference (general); North Jersey Super Football Conference (football)
- Team name: Cougars
- Accreditation: Middle States Association of Colleges and Schools
- Newspaper: Columbian
- Yearbook: Mirror
- Website: columbia.somsdk12.org

Columbia High School is a four-year comprehensive regional public high school in Maplewood, in Essex County, in the U.S. state of New Jersey. It serves students in ninth through twelfth grades, as the lone secondary school of the South Orange-Maplewood School District, which includes Maplewood and neighboring South Orange. The school has been accredited by the Middle States Association of Colleges and Schools Commissions on Elementary and Secondary Schools since 1928; its accreditation expires in July 2026.

The school is known for its connection to the invention of ultimate frisbee in 1968.

As of the 2024–25 school year, the school had an enrollment of 1,985 students and 139.5 classroom teachers (on an FTE basis), for a student–teacher ratio of 14.2:1. There were 317 students (16.0% of enrollment) eligible for free lunch and 45 (2.3% of students) eligible for reduced-cost lunch.

== School history ==
=== Beginnings ===
Since the days of the Revolution, a one-room stone schoolhouse had stood on a grassy area known as the Common, located close to the present intersection of South Orange Avenue and Academy Street in South Orange. In 1814, this building blocked the construction of a new toll highway from Newark to Morristown. The 73 "Proprietors and Associates" of the school met on August 3 of that year and resolved to erect a new school building near the site of the old one, naming seven trustees to thereafter oversee the education of local children. The resolution reflected "the desire of the meeting that the said school should in the future have the name of Columbian School of South Orange."

The new schoolhouse was a two-story wood structure, topped by a thin steeple and a lofty weather vane. It was completed before the fall term of 1815. The trustees decided "That the price of tuition in this school be fixed at $1.75 per quarter for spelling, reading and writing; for Arithmetic in addition to the above branches the sum of $0.25 cts and for Grammar or Geography the further sum of twenty-five cents." The cost of firewood was to be "divided equally among the scholars." On May 10, 1816, the trustees adopted a seal for the school in the form of "a spread eagle standing on a globe with the word Excelsior underneath in Roman Capitals."

For decades, the school was supported by tuition payments. But gradually the State began to assume a share of the financial responsibility. In 1820, a law authorized townships to levy a tax to pay the tuition of poor students. By 1828, townships had the power to tax for general school purposes. The State itself began to contribute money in 1830, and in 1846 every township was required to raise as much money each year for schools as the State itself contributed. The last tuition assessment for residents occurred in 1861, and thereafter the Columbia School was entirely supported by public taxation.

=== Post-Civil War ===
After the Civil War, improvements on the railroad contributed to a decided growth of population in the old Township of South Orange. The general character of the citizenry underwent a significant change and residents known as "commuters" began to emerge in numbers. In 1867, a state law required that Columbia become a graded school. By 1877, the old two-story wooden building erected in 1815 was found to be woefully inadequate for the growing community. One resident complained that "in very cold weather, with stoves at red heat, it is impossible to raise the temperature in the room above 55 degrees, and in such a place are sown the seeds of suffering, disease and death."

The trustees responded in 1879 by resolving to erect a new brick building, of two stories, to accommodate between 220 and 240 pupils. The new structure was opened in 1880. The final cost of construction was $17,094.49. The building later became the northeast wing of the old South Orange Junior High School, demolished when the present middle school was built.

=== 20th century ===
The close of the 19th century and the beginning of the 20th brought significant changes in high school curriculum and school management. The Board of Education had by now replaced the old board of trustees. In 1890, "manual training" was offered in school. By 1891, sciences had been added to the course of study. A tradition of excellence was beginning to evolve, and in 1892 two Columbia graduates were admitted to Cornell University. Musical enrichment was added in 1894 with the hiring of a singing teacher from New York City. Early in the 1900s the value of athletics was recognized and encouraged at Columbia by the organization of boys' and girls' teams. The student council was formed in 1912, and The Columbian student newspaper followed in 1915.

There was a reaction to these changes. Complaints arose over so-called "fads and frills"-inessentials said to be leading to the neglect of reading, writing, spelling and arithmetic. New York papers read by local commuters campaigned for a return to the efficiency of the "little old red schoolhouse." But the changes were here to stay.

At the same time, pupil behavior was becoming less inhibited, much to the distress of the adult population. Henry W. Foster, superintendent of the district from 1900 to 1927, described the conditions in 1913: "Long before prohibition was adopted, venturesome boys were surreptitiously now and then bringing liquor to dances to add to the excitement. There was a decided reversion to animalistic excitement. Musical rhythm from the wilds of barbarism stirred the pulse. The dance abandoned the restraint and refinement of waltz and polka; Bunny Hug, Turkey Trot, Fox Trot, and Shimmey began to reign."

The Board of Education reacted by banning all but "polite dances" on school premises. However, the proscribed behavior persisted, and the Board then stopped all school dances. That continued until it became apparent that students were going to outside dances anyway and the efforts at control were abandoned.

==== World War I ====
Many students and teachers were enlisted during World War I, which had a significant effect on life at Columbia. Pupils in assembly regularly delivered patriotic "four-minute speeches." Every room in the school had a full complement of war posters.

Epidemics raged during the same period of time. Polio spread around the country in 1916 and, at Columbia, resulted in the deaths of one teacher and several children. In 1918, the global influenza epidemic closed all of the schools in the district for three weeks and one teacher died.

In the early part of the 20th century most of the remaining farms in Maplewood and South Orange were sold and subdivided, leading to the present suburban character of the two communities. The increase in population placed enormous pressure on the schools. In 1900, the total district school population was 792; by 1927, it had risen to 4,960, an increase of 526%.

==== Post-World War I ====
The Board of Education initially responded by constructing a sizable addition to the old Columbia School in 1910, which building still housed primary school children as well as high school students. Seth Boyden School and the old Fielding School were erected in 1913 and 1914, respectively. In the 1920s, the district hired the firm of Guilbert and Betelle to design a number of new school buildings. By the fall of 1922 Marshall School was completed. First Street School followed the next spring, and Jefferson School opened in January 1924. Later that year the junior high schools were organized, and both the Tuscan and Montrose buildings were finished.

In 1926 construction began on the present Columbia High School building. Work was completed in September 1927, in time for the fall term.

For many years following its opening in 1927, the high school physical plant was more than sufficient for the needs of its population. Four classrooms and a shop were added to the structure in 1939 and a large addition (now C Wing) was constructed in 1958 to accommodate a growing student body. By 1964, the dimensions of a new population explosion were perceived, and a special Board of Education committee was formed to investigate the needs of Columbia High School in the 1970s. As a result of this study, it was calculated that further additions would be required. During the 1970–71 school year, B and D Wings were added at a total cost of $5,250,000.

The total high school population was now approaching 2,400. The same committee which concluded that physical additions were needed also recommended a new organizational plan to prevent students from feeling depersonalized in such a large system. What grew out of this was the House Plan, which, in 1970, divided Columbia into four sub-schools (or "houses") of approximately 600 students each. The goal was to provide the intimacy of a small school within a large plant, and each of the houses had, for example, its own student council, intramural athletic teams, and newspapers. All of these were in addition to the traditional school-wide activities. The house system ended after the 1982-1983 school academic year.

==== Vietnam War ====
Student reaction to the Vietnam War was a nationwide phenomenon, and Columbia provided no exception to the pattern. A Student Peace Group was organized at Columbia in 1968, and over 300 students actively participated. Members wore black armbands on April 26 of that year, and a community rally was held the next day with faculty members present. On March 27, 1969, a group of Columbia students were suspended for distributing leaflets in school opposing the Vietnam War, without the approval of the school's administration. The American Civil Liberties Union agreed to defend the students, but the issue became moot as the students were reinstated, though the State Commissioner of Education ruled in June 1969 that the leaflet ban could not be sustained in its original form and that a new policy would need to be implemented by the school board.

==== Invention of Ultimate Frisbee ====
The Vietnam era generally coincided with a time of protest against all things establishment. One manifestation of this was the ascendancy of Ultimate (also known as Ultimate Frisbee), which became popular around the country as an alternative to varsity sports. The game was conceived of by Columbia students in the late 1960s. It is said that the first organized game took place in 1968 between the staff of the school's student newspaper, The Columbian, and the Student Council. An annual CHS Ultimate Alumni game is played in the student parking lot on the night of Thanksgiving. The event has drawn former CHS Ultimate players from as far back as the original 1968 team to return to "The Lot" to play against the current incarnation of the team.

== Awards, recognition and ranking ==
For the 1992–93 school year, Columbia High School received the National Blue Ribbon Award of Excellence from the United States Department of Education, the highest honor that an American school can achieve.

In the 2011 "Ranking America's High Schools" issue by The Washington Post, the school was ranked 43rd in New Jersey and 1,358th nationwide. In Newsweek's May 22, 2007, issue, ranking the country's top high schools, Columbia High School was listed in 1192nd place, the 39th-highest ranked school in New Jersey. Currently they are ranked 53rd within New Jersey.

The school was the 96th-ranked public high school in New Jersey out of 339 schools statewide in New Jersey Monthly magazine's September 2014 cover story on the state's "Top Public High Schools", using a new ranking methodology. The school had been ranked 47th in the state of 328 schools in 2012, after being ranked 75th in 2010 out of 322 schools listed. The magazine ranked the school 89th in 2008 out of 316 schools. The school was also ranked 79th in the magazine's September 2006 issue, which surveyed 316 schools across the state. Schooldigger.com ranked the school 150th out of 381 public high schools statewide in its 2011 rankings (an increase of 29 positions from the 2010 ranking) which were based on the combined percentage of students classified as proficient or above proficient on the mathematics (82.5%) and language arts literacy (94.6%) components of the High School Proficiency Assessment (HSPA).

== Campus ==
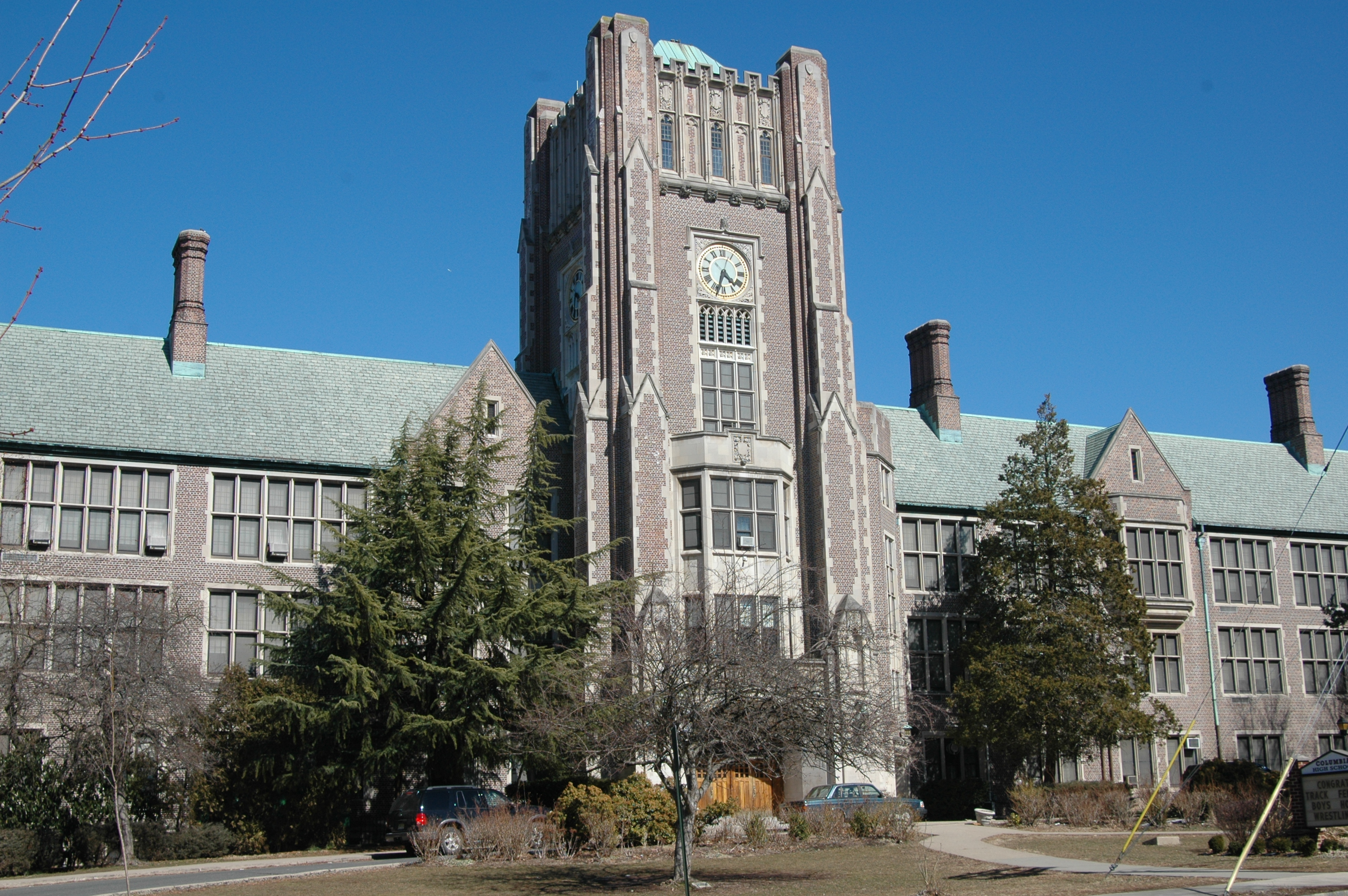
Columbia High School's clock tower, located at the front entrance on Parker Avenue.

The campus was listed by Architectural Digest on its 2017 list of the "Most Beautiful Public High School in Every State in America".

=== Main Building ===
The 1927 James Betelle designed building includes a six story clock tower with an observatory on top. The clock was originally mechanical; tunnels for the counterweights, which were wound up the tower weekly, can still be seen on the façade. It originally also housed the first radio station licensed to a high school in the United States. Major additions were made in 1958 that are now known as C wing, with the original structure referred to as A wing. B and D wings were completed in 1971.

=== Computer Room ===
In 1968, CHS added a computer room and started teaching programming classes. The first machine was an IBM 1620, replaced by 1970 with an IBM 1130 The last punchcard computer, an IBM 1401, was retired in 1982.

=== Television Studio ===
A television studio was added in 1983 and used for classes and as the broadcast center for South Orange and Maplewood's public access television stations (the two towns, while sharing a school district, were each assigned a public access channel by their respective cable television providers). The joint station was named SOMAtv in 1996. SOMAtv halted operations April 30, 2024.

=== Theatre Renovations ===
The school contains a theatre with proscenium stage, Skinner pipe organ, and a balcony with a projection booth. The seats were renovated and the stage resurfaced (removing the footlights) in a 1984 renovation. A $1.4 million major renovation was completed in 2014, replacing the original 1927 lighting control panel and seats, adding a sound control station on the balcony in front of the projection booth, repairing the pipe organ, and replacing the ceiling lighting.

=== Auto Shop ===
The school's auto repair shop was disassembled in the 1990s for construction of a black box theatre. As of 2010, this area had become a mixed-use area called The Loft.

=== Natatorium ===
The high school's natatorium, a 1920s swimming pool facility with overlooking balcony, was closed in 2013 as the school district faced high costs for maintenance. In 2025 the renovated space was unveiled as a new student commons that maintained the original Guastavino-vaulted ceiling

== Extracurricular activities ==
In 1956 (tied with Cranford High School), 1982 and again in 1990 (tied with Cherry Hill High School East), the school's chess team was the New Jersey high school team champion, winning the Father Casimir J. Finley Trophy.

The FIRST Tech Challenge robotics team 4102, founded in 2011, placed first in the New Jersey FTC state championships during its rookie year in 2011 and again in 2013, qualifying for the FIRST Championship both times and placing as a finalist both years. The team returned to the World Championship in 2017.

Columbia High School has won multiple Paper Mill Playhouse Rising Star Awards for their musical program. Bethany Pettigrew and Tricia Benn won for Best Director in 2015 for Ragtime as well as for Outstanding Achievement in Choreography and Staging for the 2022 production of Newsies. "The Silly Girls" won Outstanding Featured Ensemble Group in 2016 for Beauty and The Beast.

Columbia High School has a series of clubs. The Columbian is a club where students write a newspaper for students and staff of Columbia High School that includes topics from in the school itself, but also includes current events from around the world. The paper was recognized by the American Scholastic Press Association in 2014–2019 with first place in its Scholastic Newspaper Awards. In addition, the Columbia Politics Club debates present and past political issues.

Columbia High School was the first school in the nation to observe Earth Day.

== Athletics ==
The Columbia High School Cougars compete in the Super Essex Conference, which is comprised of public and private high schools in Essex County and was established following a reorganization of sports leagues in Northern New Jersey by the New Jersey State Interscholastic Athletic Association (NJSIAA). Prior to the NJSIAA's 2010 realignment, the school had competed as part of the Iron Hills Conference, which included public and private high schools in Essex and Union counties. Prior to 1972, the school competed in New Jersey's Big Ten Conference. With 1,514 students in grades 10-12, the school was classified by the NJSIAA for the 2019–20 school year as Group IV for most athletic competition purposes, which included schools with an enrollment of 1,060 to 5,049 students in that grade range. The football team competes in the Freedom White division of the North Jersey Super Football Conference, which includes 112 schools competing in 20 divisions, making it the nation's biggest football-only high school sports league. The school was classified by the NJSIAA as Group V North for football for 2024–2026, which included schools with 1,317 to 5,409 students.

The school participates with Bloomfield High School in a joint ice hockey team in which Nutley High School is the host school / lead agency. The co-op program operates under agreements scheduled to expire at the end of the 2023–24 school year.

Ultimate Frisbee was invented at Columbia High School in 1968. The school's Ultimate team has won 19 New Jersey state championships, including a 12-year streak from 2001–2013, then again in 2015, 2018, 2019, 2021, 2025 and 2026.

After the passage of Title IX, federal requirements called for more women's sports. As part of the school district's response, CHS soccer coach Eugene Chyzowych began coaching a new girls volleyball team in 1976. The team went on to win 247 consecutive regular season games from 1977 to 1988, being undefeated for more than 10 years, a state record at the time for any high school sporting team, and as of 2025 still the second longest winning streak in US high school girls volleyball history.

The school's fencing team was started in 1982 and was included in the sport section of the yearbook for the first time. Prior to this it had existed as a fencing club for a couple of years before.

=== Athletic titles ===
Trailing by eight points in the final three minutes of the championship game at the Newark Armory, the 1925 boys basketball team came back to win the Class B (since recategorized as Group III) state title with a 24-21 victory against Princeton High School.

The boys swimming team won the Public state championship in 1942, 1949, 1955 and 1956, and won the Division A title in 1960.

The boys spring / outdoor track team won the Group IV state championship in 1948.

The boys cross-country team won the Group IV boys' title in 1960.

The boys' tennis team won the Group IV state championship in 1969, defeating Teaneck High School in the semifinals and Ridgewood High School 2-1 in the tournament final.

The boys' soccer team won the Group IV state championship in 1978 (defeating Brick Township High School in the finals), 1979 (vs. Neptune High School), 1989 (vs. East Brunswick High School) and 1998 (vs. Bridgewater-Raritan High School). The team was coached for 50 years by Gene Chyzowych, who had 757 career wins in his coaching career that ended in 2013, making him one of the most successful scholastic soccer coaches in the nation's history. The 2007 boys' soccer team won the North II, Group IV state sectional championship with a 1–0 win over Westfield High School in the tournament final.

The baseball team won the Greater Newark Tournament in 1978, 1979, 1986 and 1995. The program's four titles are tied for fifth-most in tournament history through 2019. The team won the 1995 Greater Newark Tournament title, defeating Belleville High School 1-0 in the finals.

The girls basketball team won the Group IV state title in 1979 (defeating Atlantic City High School in the tournament final), 1998 (vs. Piscataway High School) and 2001 (vs. Marlboro High School).

The boys' lacrosse team won the overall state championship in 1979 (defeating Montclair High School in the final game of the tournament) and 1982 (vs. West Morris Central High School). The 1979 team finished the season with a 17-0 record after winning the state title against defending-champion Montclair. The 1982 team won the state title with a 10-6 win against Summit in the championship game.

The girls' track and field team won the New Jersey Group IV indoor relay state championship in 1982-1984, 1994, 1996-1998, 2004, 2013 and 2014; the 10 state titles are tied for the most won by any girls track program. The girls track team won the winter / indoor track Group IV state championship in 1983, 1994–98, 2010 and 2012-14. The program's 10 state group titles are tied for the most in the state.

The wrestling team won the North II Group IV state sectional championship in 1989.

The girls spring / outdoor track won the Group IV state championship in 1994-1998 and 2010-2014. The 10 state titles won by the program are ranked third in the state and the two five-year streaks are the seventh-longest in state history.

The field hockey team won the North II Group IV state sectional title in 1995 and 1996.

The girls fencing team won the state team championship in 1998-2001, 2003-2006, 2008, 2012, 2014 and 2015; the twelve team championships won by the girls fencing team are the most of any school in state history. The team was foil team winner in 2004-2008 and 2015, épée team winner in 2005-2007, and sabre team winner in 2004; the 11 team titles are the most of any school in New Jersey. The girls' team record for the combined 1999–2005 seasons was 94–4. In 2006, the girls' fencing team defeated Bernards High School 19–8 to win the NJSIAA 2006 Girls' team fencing state tournament.

The boys fencing team won the overall state title in 2003, 2004, 2007, 2010, 2011, 2013 and 2014; the seven team titles are ranked third in the state. The team was épée team winner in 2004 and 2009, and was the sabre team winner in 2005, 2013, 2014 and 2016. Columbia won the 2007 Boys' Team Fencing state championship with a 16–11 win over Voorhees High School. In the 2008–09 season, the boys' fencing team took home the épée state title. In the 2009–10 season, the boys' team won the Cetrulo Tournament and the NJSIAA/Bollinger District 3 championships, earning them a top seed going into the NJSIAA state championship Tournament. The boys' team won state championships for the first time since 2007 in a 15–12 win over Bernards High School. In 2010-11, the boys won their second consecutive state championship defeating Montclair High School in the final by a 14–13 score. In the 2012 NJSIAA/Bollinger tournament, Columbia lost in the final to second-seeded West Morris Mendham High School by a score of 14–13, ending the school's 49-match winning streak.

Columbia's varsity football team had been notably unsuccessful for several years, winning only two games over a span of five seasons, including three consecutive winless seasons from 2005 to 2007, but broke their 45-game losing streak with a 48–0 victory over Dickinson High School in the last game of the 2008 season.

The 2019 Columbia / Nutley co-op team won the McMullen Cup and the Monsignor Kelly Cup in 2019. The team won the McMullen Cup in 2019 with a 4–2 win against Frisch School in the tournament final at the Richard J. Codey Arena.

The 2023 varsity softball team won the North I Group IV state sectional title, their first since 1979, after defeating Livingston High School, ranked number 17 in the NJ.com Top 20 at the time, by a score of 7–5 in extra innings.

== Controversy ==
In the mid-1970s the school district was sued for teaching Transcendental Meditation and its Science of Creative Intelligence course for credit. The U.S. District Court ruled in the case called, Malnak v. Yogi (1979), that TM was "religious in nature" and that its use in public schools was in violation of the Establishment Clause of the First Amendment to the United States Constitution which requires "separation of church and state."

In June 2000, writer Tamar Lewin of The New York Times wrote "Growing Up, Growing Apart", a lengthy feature highlighting how an ethnically diverse trio struggled to maintain friendships and cope with teen life at Columbia. The story trailed Aqeelah Mateen, an African-American Muslim, Kelly Regan, an Irish Catholic, and Johanna Perez-Fox, a Puerto Rican Jew; the group quickly became ambassadors for the school, and for their respective ethnic groups. The article wasn't controversial, per se, but directed national attention to the school district and to Columbia specifically.

In 2004, Columbia High School made national headlines when the administration amended a policy regarding religiously themed holiday songs putting more strict guidelines in place. Many people believed the new rules to be too strict. Radio personality Don Imus produced a song on his radio program entitled "Oh, Little Town of Maplewood", mocking the new rules of Columbia High School. The new guidelines were also mentioned on The O'Reilly Factor.

In the school year 2018–2019, 35% of the students were African American and 52% were White. Within this black-and-white composition are found a variety of ethnic backgrounds including Jamaican, Nigerian, Haitian, African-American, English, French, Jewish, Polish, Italian, and Irish. There has been much discussion regarding the Racial Academic Achievement Gap in the school district, and the tracking is often cited as the most glaring example of a racial disparity.

Columbia High School has also had many student-led walkouts. In late March 2006 hundreds of students walked out after tensions with the principal regarding censorship issues and racial comments. The students were calling for her resignation. The next year a new acting principal was instated and the following school year she became the official principal. On April 27, 2010, hundreds of students participated in a statewide walkout of high school students protesting the budget cuts put in place by Chris Christie. On January 20, 2017, in protest of the presidential inauguration of Donald Trump, hundreds of CHS students participated in a school walk-out and marched to the Maplewood Town Hall building. In January 2026, there was a student-led walk out protesting Immigration and Customs Enforcement (ICE) following the deaths of Renee Good, Keith Porter Jr., and many others, as well as the presence of ICE within South Orange and Maplewood. Headed by the Students For Justice club, students gathered outside the school and spoke out and protested against the actions of ICE.

In September 2014, instructor Nicole Dufault was indicted on 40 counts of aggravated sexual assault committed against six male students.

In October 2014, the American Civil Liberties Union filed a complaint against Columbia High School and the South Orange-Maplewood School District in relation to its academic leveling and disciplinary systems, stating that the overuse of discipline and "zero-tolerance" policy, and implicit racial bias within the level selection system violate Title VI of the Civil Rights Act of 1964 and Section 504 of the Rehabilitation Act of 1973. Claims were made that the suspension rate for black students was five times higher than that for white students, in a classroom environment in which black students were significantly underrepresented in AP and honors classes. In late February 2018, the non-profit The Black Parents Workshop filed a new suit concerning this same topic — systematic suppression of minority students via their academic opportunities. In July 2020, with the conclusion of a subsequent lawsuit, Columbia and the District more broadly, agreed to enact an integration plan. The plan was designed with input from Temple University Professor Edward Fergus, and implementation will be overseen by retired New Jersey Supreme Court Justice John Wallace, Jr.

In March 2023, Columbia principal Frank Sanchez was involved in a confrontation with a student, resulting in his eventual arrest and charge. In the weeks following the incident, the student in question filed an Affirmative Action complaint against Sanchez, alleging he used excessive force by grabbing her and slamming her against a wall. Sanchez claims he was preventing an altercation between the student and others who said she had threatened them. The incident, partially captured on video from three different sources, has sparked division in the community, and following official and private investigations, has led to legal proceedings questioning whether Sanchez used excessive force or acted to protect students. Principal Sanchez was put on paid administrative leave in January 2024, and in March 2024 surrendered himself to detectives working for the Essex County Prosecutor's Office on charges of simple assault and second-degree endangering the welfare of a child. Sanchez entered a not guilty plea in his first court appearance and was released, with a future court date slated for June 14, 2024.

== Administration ==
The school's principal is Frank Sanchez, whose administrative team includes four assistant principals. Ann Bodnar, an assistant district superintendent, was named as interim principal in January 2024 after Frank Sanchez was placed on administrative leave. In March 2024, Sanchez was charged with second-degree assault and endangering the welfare of child, related to an incident that took place a year before with a school student; Sanchez pleaded not guilty. Ricardo Pedro was named in April 2024 as interim principal and served in the position through June; Bodnar returned to her position as an assistant superintendent. Sanchez was returned to his position after being acquitted.

== Notable alumni ==
The school has a hall of fame listing many notable alumni. They include:

- Paul Auster (born 1947, class of 1965), PEN Literary Award-winning author
- Tom Auth (born 1968, class of 1986), rower who competed at the 1996 Summer Olympics and the 2000 Summer Olympics
- Ahmed Best (born 1973, class of 1991), actor most widely known for playing Jar Jar Binks in the Star Wars movie series
- Mark Blum (born 1950, class of 1968), actor
- Zach Braff (born 1975, class of 1993), actor, producer, writer, director; leading actor on the television series Scrubs
- Julie Brill (born 1959, class of 1977), Commissioner of the Federal Trade Commission from 2010 to 2016
- Marques Brownlee (born 1993, class of 2011), video blogger, best known for his technology-based YouTube channel
- Mark Bryant (born 1965, class of 1984), former NBA basketball player
- Hazel Clark (born 1977, class of 1995), three time US Olympic runner and seven-time national champion
- Peter S. Connor (1932–1966, class of 1950), Marine posthumously awarded the Medal of Honor
- Matthew Cooper (born 1963, class of 1980), reporter for Time magazine; Political Editor for Time.com
- Orrin Devinsky (born 1957, class of 1974), neurologist; director of the NYU Comprehensive Epilepsy Center
- Joetta Clark Diggs (born 1962, class of 1980), four-time Olympic athlete known as the "queen of American middle-distance running"
- Peter Eisenman (born 1932), architect; one of the earliest practitioners of deconstructivism in American architecture
- Linda Gottlieb (class of 1956), producer of Dirty Dancing
- Lauryn Hill (born 1975, class of 1993), eight-time Grammy Award-winning artist; member of The Fugees
- Helen E. Hoens (born 1954, class of 1972), Associate Justice of the New Jersey Supreme Court, 2006–2013
- Erna Schneider Hoover (born 1926, class of 1944), mathematician; invented a computerized telephone switching method
- Alberto Ibargüen (born 1944, class of 1962), publisher; first Hispanic publisher of the Miami Herald; Pulitzer Prize winner for coverage of the Elián González story
- David Javerbaum (born 1971, class of 1989), 13-time Emmy Award-winning comedy writer, lyricist, and producer; head writer for The Daily Show, writer for The Onion, David Letterman and his own theatrical productions; first runner-up in 1988 Jeopardy! Teen Tournament
- Amalya Kearse (born 1937, class of 1955), judge; first female African American partner in a Wall Street law firm; first female United States Court of Appeals judge
- Alfred Kinsey (1894–1956, class of 1912), biologist; created the field of study of sexology; subject of the 2004 film Kinsey
- David Masur (born 1962, class of 1980), retired soccer midfielder who played in the Major Indoor Soccer League, American Professional Soccer League and USISL, and is head coach of the St. John's Red Storm men's soccer team
- Ibtihaj Muhammad (born 1985, class of 2003), sabre fencer, author and Olympic medalist, who competed at the 2016 Summer Olympics, where she became the first American woman to compete in the Olympics in hijab
- Rotimi (born 1988, class of 2006), actor and singer
- Roy Scheider (1932–2008, class of 1950), actor most widely known for his leading roles in Jaws and The French Connection (for which he was nominated for an Academy Award)
- Andrew Shue (born 1967, class of 1985), actor best known for his leading role on the television series Melrose Place, who produced and appeared in the 2007 film Gracie
- Elisabeth Shue (born 1963, class of 1981), Academy Award-nominated actress of Leaving Las Vegas, Gracie, The Karate Kid and The Saint
- Robert Sternberg (born 1949, class of 1968), psychologist and researcher in the field of human intelligence, who is a primary figure behind the triarchic theory of intelligence
- Leigh Howard Stevens (born 1953), marimba artist
- SZA (born Solana Imani Rowe) (born 1989, class of 2008), Academy Award-nominated and Grammy Award-winning singer-songwriter
- Robert Verdi (born 1968, class of 1986), television personality
- Judith Viorst (born 1931), poet and children's book author
- Max Weinberg (born 1951, class of 1969), drummer for Bruce Springsteen and the E Street Band; band leader of The Max Weinberg 7 of Late Night with Conan O'Brien
- C. K. Williams (1936–2015, class of 1954), Pulitzer Prize- and National Book Award-winning poet
- Teresa Wright (1918–2005, class of 1938), Academy Award-winning actress whose films include Mrs. Miniver, Shadow of a Doubt, and The Pride of the Yankees
- Myrth York (born 1946, class of 1964), politician

Other notable alumni not currently in the hall of fame include:

- Mobolaji Akiode (born 1982, class of 1999), former Nigerian women's professional basketball player
- Amy Arnsten (born 1954, class of 1972), neuroscientist at Yale Medical School and an elected member of the National Academy of Medicine; discovered how stress impairs higher brain functions and developed guanfacine (Intuniv) for the treatment of prefrontal cortex cognitive disorders
- Shan K. Bagby (born 1967, class of 1985), U.S. Army brigadier general and the 28th Chief of the Army Dental Corps
- Olivia Baker (born 1996), middle-distance runner who specializes in the 800 meters
- Dan Baum (1956–2020, class of 1974), journalist and writer
- Ken Bloom, particle physicist who was captain of the school's physics team
- Joshua Braff (born 1967), novelist
- Marc Brown (born 1969, class of 1987), basketball coach and retired professional player; head basketball coach at New Jersey City University
- Bisa Butler (born 1973, class of 1991), fiber artist known for her quilted portraits and designs celebrating black life
- Patricia Charache (1929–2015, class of 1948), physician specializing in infectious disease and microbiology
- Claude Coleman Jr. (born 1974), musician who is the drummer of the alternative rock band Ween
- Paul R. Ehrlich (1932–2026, class of 1949), entomologist, professor of population studies; author of The Population Bomb
- Roy Eisenhardt (born 1939), lawyer and former president of the Oakland Athletics
- Mike Enoch (born 1977, class of 1995), White Nationalist blogger and podcaster, founder of The Right Stuff Radio
- Bruce Feirstein (born 1956), screenwriter and journalist best known for his screenplays for the James Bond films GoldenEye, Tomorrow Never Dies and The World Is Not Enough, and his best-selling humor books, including Real Men Don't Eat Quiche
- Fred Feldman (born 1941, class of 1959), philosopher who specializes in ethical theory
- David Ferry (1924–2023), poet and translator who won the National Book Award for Poetry in 2012
- Donna Fiducia (born 1956, class of 1975), radio DJ and TV news reader
- Christian Fuscarino (born c. 1990), community organizer; LGBT activist; Executive Director of Garden State Equality
- Kai Greene (born 1993), soccer player for Rio Grande Valley FC Toros in the United Soccer League
- Buzzy Hellring (died 1971, class of 1970), key developer of Ultimate; killed in an auto accident his first year at Princeton University
- Isaiah Hill (born 2002, class of 2020), model and actor, known for his role as Jace Carson in the Apple TV+ series Swagger, a character loosely based on Kevin Durant
- Andrew Jacobs, journalist for The New York Times; documentary film director and producer
- James Kaplan (born 1951, class of 1969), author of Two Guys from Verona
- Peter W. Kaplan (1954–2013, class of 1972), editor of The New York Observer
- Joe Kinney (born c. 1968, class of 1984), college baseball coach and former outfielder; head coach of the Lafayette Leopards baseball team
- Robert Kirsch (born 1966), state court judge from New Jersey who is a nominee to serve as a United States district judge of the United States District Court for the District of New Jersey
- Jessica Kirson (born 1969), stand-up comedian and producer
- Eileen Kraus (1938–2017), business executive who broke the glass ceiling to become the first woman to run a major bank in Connecticut
- Frank Langella (born 1938, class of 1955), actor
- David Levin (1948–2017), balloonist; only person to have completed the "triple crown" by winning the World Gas Balloon Championship, the World Hot Air Ballooning Championships and the Gordon Bennett Cup
- Marc Levin (born 1951), independent film producer and director, best known for his Brick City TV series
- Mark Leyner (born 1956), postmodernist author
- Selah Marley (born 1998), model
- Leyla McCalla (born 1985), musician
- Richard Meier (born 1934, class of 1952), architect whose work includes his design of the Getty Center
- Grace Mirabella (1929–2021), former editor-in-chief of Vogue magazine; founder of Mirabella magazine
- Yosh Nijman (born 1995), American football offensive tackle for the Green Bay Packers of the National Football League
- John Orsi (1908–1978), football player and coach who was inducted into the College Football Hall of Fame
- Ellen Pao (born 1970, class of 1987), former CEO of Reddit
- Ahmad Khan Rahami (born 1988), suspect in the September 2016 New York and New Jersey bombings; later transferred to Edison High School
- Eugene G. Rochow (1909–2002, class of 1927), inorganic chemist who worked on organosilicon chemistry
- Mark Rudd (born 1947, class of 1965), activist who led student war protests at CHS and later at Columbia University; help founded The Weathermen
- Ralph Sazio (1922–2008, class of 1941), former football player, assistant coach, head coach general manager and team president of the Hamilton Tiger-Cats; inducted into the Canadian Football Hall of Fame in 1998 as a builder
- Robert Sheckley (1928–2005, class of 1946), Hugo and Nebula-nominated science fiction writer
- Pauline Gibling Schindler (1893–1977), Los Angeles arts figure
- Cortlandt V. R. Schuyler (1900–1993, class of 1918), United States Army four-star general
- Peter Shapiro (1952–2024), financial services executive and former politician who was the youngest person ever elected to the New Jersey General Assembly and went on to serve as Essex County Executive
- Joel Silver (born 1952, class of 1970), producer of films such as Lethal Weapon 4 and The Matrix; invented Ultimate in 1968
- Kiki Smith (born 1954, did not graduate), sculptor
- Angela Yee (born 1976, class of 1993), radio personality
- Strauss Zelnick (born 1957), businessman and lawyer who is the former chairman of media conglomerate CBS Corporation

== In popular culture ==
- Lauryn Hill, for her 1998 release The Miseducation of Lauryn Hill, was photographed in one of the school's bathrooms.
- Garden State (2004): The school is both shown and referenced in this Zach Braff film, which was partly filmed in neighboring South Orange and Millburn.
- Gracie (2007): Columbia, its varsity soccer team, and its marching band were featured in Gracie, a film loosely based on the lives of alumni Elisabeth Shue and Andrew Shue; the film was directed by Elisabeth Shue's husband, Davis Guggenheim, and produced by the Shues, who also acted in it.
- A Good Person (2023): The film, written and directed by CHS alumnus Zach Braff includes scenes shot at Columbia's athletic fields, as well as the South Orange train station.
