= The Dying Field =

Plot of land in Canton, Qing China

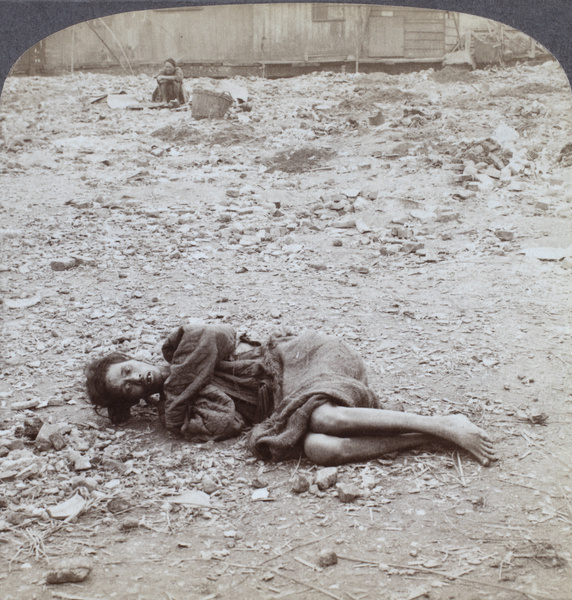
Dying in the "Dying Field" where discouraged poor are allowed to come to die, James Ricalton, 1900

The "Dying Field", or "Dying Place", was a small plot of land in Canton (now Guangzhou), Qing China, at the turn of the 20th century, where the sick, poor, and those who had given up on life could go to die undisturbed.

== Description ==
The field was located in Canton, close to the Pearl River. According to American teacher James Ricalton, who visited and photographed the location in 1900, the field was a littered common area scavenged by stray dogs. Vagrants and the sick would travel from different parts of the city (or sometimes country) to "choose to die". Once in the field, they would be unbothered by passersby. After they succumbed to disease or starvation, their bodies would often remain in the field for several days until authorities came to remove them. The bodies would then be buried in a potter's field. Ricalton, describing a scene he photographed in the field, wrote:

I attempted to catch a view of others, who, having a trifle more vitality left, crawled away on hands and knees. His glassy, fixed gaze tells how soon his long, hard struggle will be over; how soon even the grimy rags that cover his nakedness will be unnecessary. With a stone for his pillow, a sack for his garment, without food or friends, an uncoffined grave will soon be his; he has begged a fellow mortal for work, but it was refused him. Would that the vast numbers who squander extravagantly and needlessly unearned wealth could witness the innumerable instances like this—of existence so full of suffering that death is welcome. This far-gone case of destitution and misery is not the only one in this last retreat of human agony; you see another in the distance, probably a new arrival, as he has yet strength to sit erect.

== See also ==
- Aokigahara
- Suicide in China
