= Orrin Devinsky =

American neurologist

- Born: February 12, 1957 (age 69); Brooklyn, NY
- Medical career
- Institutions: Director, NYU Comprehensive Epilepsy Center and the Saint Barnabas Institute of Neurology and Neurosurgery (INN), Professor of Neurology, Neurosurgery, and Psychiatry at NYU Langone School of Medicine

Orrin Devinsky (born February 12, 1957) is an American neurologist who is the Director of the NYU Comprehensive Epilepsy Center and the Saint Barnabas Institute of Neurology and Neurosurgery (INN). He is also a professor of Neurology, Neurosurgery, and Psychiatry at NYU Langone School of Medicine. Devinsky specializes in epilepsy and behavioral neurology.

== Education and academic career ==
Devinsky graduated from Columbia High School in Maplewood, New Jersey in 1974 and was inducted into the school's hall of fame in 1995.

Devinsky was mentored by Norman Geschwind, who stimulated his interest in both epilepsy and behavioral neurology.

He received his B.S. and M.S. from Yale University (1977) and his M.D. from Harvard Medical School (1982). He interned at Boston's Beth Israel Hospital, completed neurology training at the New York Hospital-Cornell Medical Center, and his epilepsy fellowship at the National Institutes of Health (NIH).

Devinsky arrived at Saint Barnabas Medical Center in 1998. In 2009, Saint Barnabas’ Neurology and Neurosurgery Program became the first in New Jersey to make U.S. News & World Report top 50 in the nation list.

Devinsky directs The Comprehensive Epilepsy Center (CEC) at New York University Langone Medical Center. The CEC has 16 inpatient video-EEG-monitored beds in a specialized Epilepsy Monitoring Unit. Each bed has the capacity for 64 channels of EEG data with on-line computer analysis for 24-hour seizure and spike detection.

He has chaired several committees of the American Epilepsy Society and has served as a board member. He is active in the American Academy of Neurology and the Epilepsy Foundation. He is an associate editor of Epilepsy & Behavior and co-founded Reviews in Neurological Disorders, and serves as a reviewer for more than 30 journals.

Devinsky founded Finding A Cure for Epilepsy and Seizures (FACES) and co-founded epilepsy.com. He co-founded the Epilepsy Therapy Project, where he serves as the Vice President for Translational programs.

Devinsky has appeared on many television news programs, including NBC Nightly News, Today Show, and Good Morning America, and he has been featured several times on Mystery Diagnosis. He was invited to the White House to ask President Obama a question about Health Care.

In 2017, Devinsky became the chairman of Tilray's Medical Advisory Board.

== Research ==
Devinsky's epilepsy research interests include translational therapies, sudden unexpected death in epilepsy (SUDEP), devices to deliver drugs directly to the brain, quality of life, cognitive and behavioral issues in epilepsy, surgical therapy, and new medications. Other areas of active interest include autism, tuberous sclerosis, and head trauma.

Devinsky serves as the director of the Phenome Core for the Epilepsy Phenome/Genome Project, funded by an NIH multi-institutional grant. Devinsky and his co-investigators are conducting studies of several investigational antiepileptic medications such as topiramate, tiagabine, lamotrigine, vigabatrin, oxcarbazepine, and remacemide, as well as vagal nerve stimulator implantation. He is also collaborating with other researchers to develop a device to deliver antiepileptic drugs directly to the brain to treat seizures.

He was involved in pivotal drug studies for felbamate, oxcarbazepine, intravenous valproate and other drugs. He was the lead investigator of the Quality of Life in Epilepsy group that developed the four inventories that were translated into many languages and used in over 150 academic studies.

== Publications ==
=== Articles ===
Devinsky has published more than 350 articles and book chapters.

=== Books ===
Devinsky has authored more than 20 books and monographs.

Alternative Therapies for Epilepsy (Orrin Devinsky, Steven C. Schachter, Steven V. Pacia) 2012

Epilepsy (Orrin Devinsky) 2007

Complementary and Alternative Therapies for Epilepsy (Orrin Devinsky, Steven C. Schachter, and Steven V. Pacia) 2005

Managing Epilepsy and Co-Existing Disorders, i.e. (Alan B. Ettinger and Orrin Devinsky) 2001

Epilepsy and Developmental Disabilities, 1e (Orrin Devinsky and Lauren Westbrook) 2001

Examination of the Cranial and Peripheral Nerves, i.e. (Orrin Devinsky and Edward Feldman) 1987

Neurological Complications of Pregnancy (Advances in Neurology) (Orrin Devinsky, Edward Feldmann, and Brian Hainline) 1994
