= Bernard Hellring =

Creator of Ultimate frisbee

- Died: 1971; Princeton University, New Jersey, United States
- Education: Columbia High School
- Known for: Co-creating Ultimate
- Parent(s): Bernard Hellring; Sally Horner Hellring

Bernard "Buzzy" Hellring was a co-creator of Ultimate Frisbee. Along with Joel Silver and Johnny Hines, Hellring created ultimate in the parking lot of Columbia High School in Maplewood, New Jersey. and subsequently codified the rules of the sport.

Hellring was the son of Bernard Hellring, an attorney and New Jersey Commissioner of Uniform State Law and Sally Horner Hellring of South Orange, New Jersey, part of the South Orange-Maplewood School District.

Hellring died in an auto accident at Princeton University in 1971. He was elected posthumously into the Ultimate Hall of Fame.

After his death, funds were raised to fulfill his dream of producing the high school newspaper he edited as an in-house daily, through purchase of a large Heidelberg printing press. This press was sold sometime in the late 1990s as traditional printing arts were replaced by computer-based technologies in the school's curricula.
