= Living on the Edge of the World =

Living on the Edge of the World may refer to:

- "Living on the Edge of the World", a song by Bruce Springsteen on his 1998 album Tracks
- Living on the Edge of the World, a collection of short stories by Joshua Braff
