= Ken Bloom =

Ken Bloom may refer to:

- Ken Bloom (writer), American theatre historian, playwright and author
- Ken Bloom (physicist), American particle physicist
