= Hysterical (2021 film) =

- Official poster
- Directed by: Andrea Blaugrund Nevins
- Produced by: Jessica Kirson; Ross M. Dinerstein; Carolina Groppa; Rebecca Evans
- Starring: Judy Gold; Carmen Lynch; Kathy Griffin; Nikki Glaser; Jessica Kirson; Marina Franklin; Bonnie McFarlane; Rachel Feinstein; Lisa Lampanelli; Kelly Bachman; Iliza Shlesinger; Fortune Feimster; Sherri Shepherd; Margaret Cho
- Cinematography: Carmen Delaney
- Edited by: Andrea Lewis; Dava Whisenant
- Music by: John Dragonetti; Mike Sawitzke
- Production companies: Campfire; Milestone; FXP
- Distributed by: FX
- Release dates: March 16, 2021 (SXSW); April 2, 2021 (United States)
- Running time: 87 minutes
- Country: United States
- Language: English

"Hysterical" is a 2021 American documentary film, directed and produced by Andrea Blaugrund Nevins. It follows multiple comedians throughout their lives on stage and off. Judy Gold, Carmen Lynch, Kathy Griffin, Nikki Glaser, Jessica Kirson, Marina Franklin, Bonnie McFarlane, Rachel Feinstein, Lisa Lampanelli, Kelly Bachman, Iliza Shlesinger, Fortune Feimster, Sherri Shepherd and Margaret Cho appear in the film.

It had its world premiere at South by Southwest on March 16, 2021. It was released on April 2, 2021, by FX.

== Synopsis ==
The film follows multiple women comedians on stage, backstage, and off stage, exploring their hard-fought journey to become voices of their generation.

== Cast ==
- Judy Gold
- Carmen Lynch
- Kathy Griffin
- Nikki Glaser
- Jessica Kirson
- Marina Franklin
- Bonnie McFarlane
- Rachel Feinstein
- Lisa Lampanelli
- Kelly Bachman
- Iliza Shlesinger
- Fortune Feimster
- Sherri Shepherd
- Margaret Cho
- Wendy Liebman
- Moms Mabley (archival footage)
- Phyllis Diller (archival footage)
- Joan Rivers (archival footage)
- Wanda Sykes (archival footage)
- Totie Fields (archival footage)
- Elayne Boosler (archival footage)
- Amy Schumer (archival footage)
- Chelsea Handler (archival footage)
- Ali Wong (archival footage)

== Release ==
The film had its world premiere at South by Southwest on March 16, 2021. It was released in the United States on FX on April 2, 2021. It will have its international premiere at Hot Docs International Film Festival on April 29, 2021.

== Reception ==
Hysterical holds an 88% approval rating on review aggregator website Rotten Tomatoes, based on 17 reviews, with a weighted average of 8.3/10. The website's critics consensus reads, "Hysterical may not probe systemic disadvantages as deeply as it could have, but it excels as a frank and sometimes joyous celebration of very funny women who have made their mark in an industry that often marginalizes their achievements." On Metacritic, the film holds a rating of 75 out of 100, based on 4 critics, indicating "generally favorable" reviews.
