= Gene Chyzowych =

American soccer coach (1935–2014)

Eugene Chyzowych
- Born: January 27, 1935
- Died: May 10, 2014 (aged 79)

Eugene Chyzowych (January 27, 1935 – May 10, 2014), was a professional soccer player and coach, who was the coach of the Columbia High School soccer team in Maplewood, New Jersey, United States. He had the second most wins of any active scholastic soccer coach in the United States, and compiled a 730–188–70 record in 46 years at Columbia High School through 2009. He directed his teams to four New Jersey state championships and 24 conference titles. His squads have also captured 16 state sectional crowns, and have produced numerous All-America, All-State and All-Conference players in high school and college, several of whom have gone on to become college and high school soccer coaches themselves. He is a two-time NSCAA Boys High School National Coach of the Year (1986 and 1990), and received the association's Robert W. Robinson Award for long-time service to interscholastic soccer in 1999. Chyzowych also coached the Columbia girls volleyball team, compiling a 227–0 career record, a 10-year winning streak and likewise producing numerous championship and lauded athletes.

Chyzowych was born in Sambor county, Ukraine (then part of Poland) and moved with his family across war torn Europe to eventually settle in Philadelphia after World War II. He grew up in Philadelphia and attended Northeast Catholic High School where he was part of a team that won the city championship in 1952. He was the team's leading goal scorer during that season. He then went on to a four-year college career at Temple University, graduating in 1958, and became the head soccer coach at Columbia High School in 1963. He was one of the first coaches in the U.S. to set up a recreational-to-club-to-high school feeder program, and to provide opportunities for players to play year-round. That model was copied by other coaches and schools nationwide in an effort to approximate his success.

Chyzowych was the head coach of the United States national team in 1973, coaching the team to a 3–2–0 record.

In 1976, he was head coach of the New York Apollo of the American Soccer League. He was the younger brother of Igor Chyzowych, who also played professional soccer, and the older brother of Walter Chyzowych, who also coached the U.S. Men's National Team.

In 1976, after Title IX created government requirements for more women's sports, Chyzowych started coaching girls volleyball at Columbia High. By 1985, his team was undefeated in regular season play for 172 games, a state record for any high school sports team.

In January 2009, Chyzowych was inducted into the National Soccer Coaches Association of America's Hall of Fame at a ceremony in St. Louis.

Chyzowych taught physical education at Columbia High School and coached the boys' varsity soccer team until his retirement in January 2014.

A resident of West Orange, New Jersey, Chyzowych died of cancer on May 10, 2014.

Gene Chyzowych Soccer Field is located near Columbia High School.The field is mainly used by the Cougar Soccer Club and sometimes by Columbia High School.
