= James Ricalton =

American teacher and photographer (1844–1929)

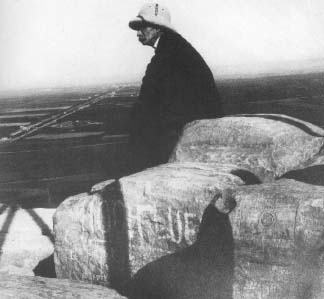
- Self portrait of James Ricalton on the Great Pyramid in Giza, Egypt
- Born: May 13, 1844; Waddington, New York, U.S.
- Died: October 28, 1929 (aged 85); Waddington, New York, U.S.
- Occupations: Photographer, inventor, teacher

James Ricalton (born May 13, 1844, in Half Way, near Waddington, New York – d. October 28, 1929, in Waddington) was an American school teacher, traveler, inventor, and photographer. Ricalton travelled extensively and he circumnavigated the world seven times.

== Maplewood ==
After briefly attending St. Lawrence University (class of 1871) Ricalton left before taking a degree and moved to Maplewood, New Jersey in 1871 for a 12-week, $200 contract as a school teacher. Contrary to practice at the time, his contract was renewed repeatedly until he became the district's first permanent school teacher and eventually principal. His legacy is celebrated in the South Orange-Maplewood School District.

Ricalton was locally famous for his habit of conducting classes outdoors in good weather and for his gentle manner. Among other things, a central square in Maplewood village is named after him, and there is a large mural of his outdoor classes in Maplewood municipal hall.

He expanded his house on Valley Street in Maplewood to house his enormous collection. When the township of Maplewood declined to accept his collection as a gift, he moved it all in two and a half train cars to his birth town of Waddington, where he spent his last five years.

== Traveler ==
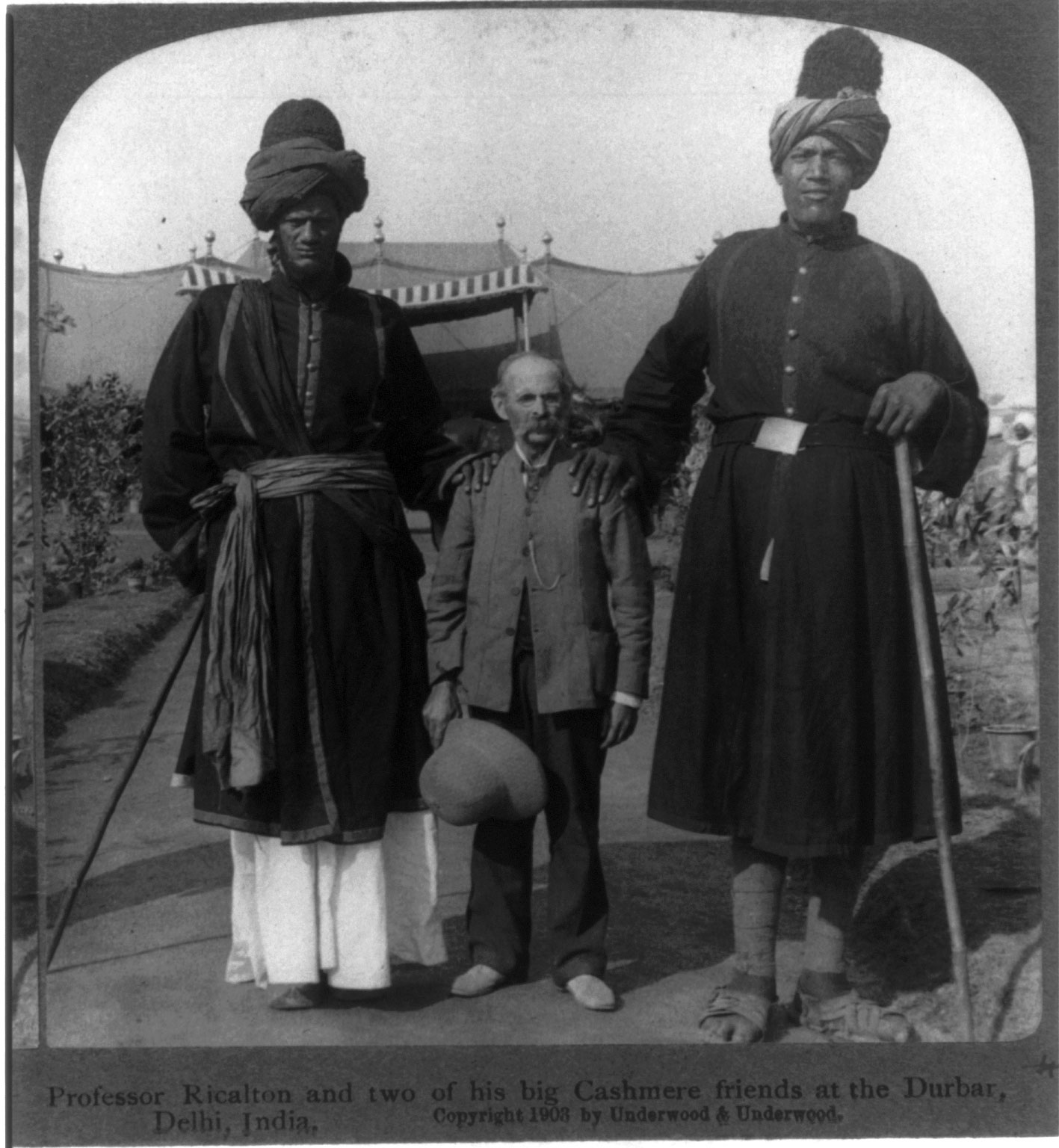
Professor Ricalton with two giants of India at the Delhi Durbar of 1903.

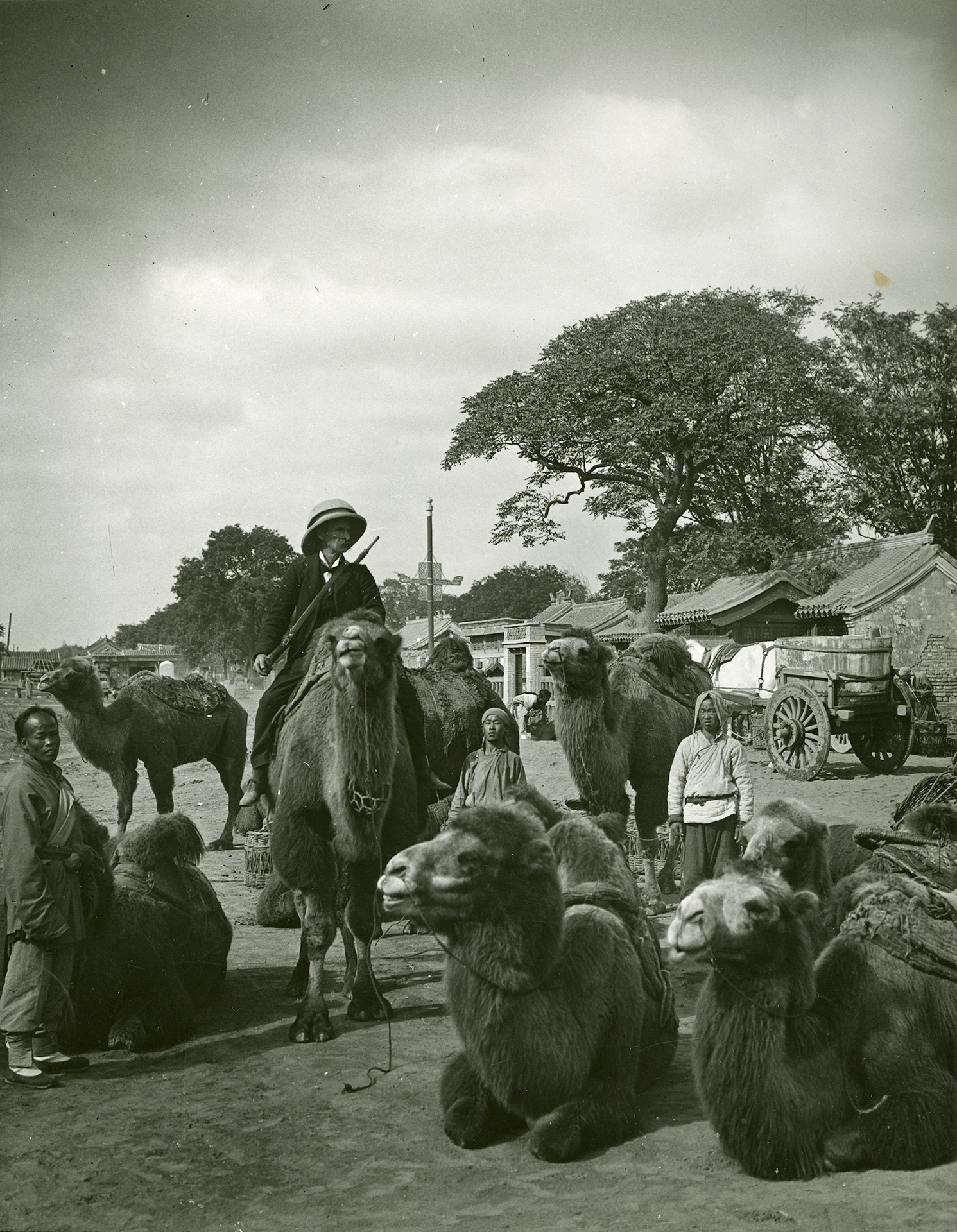
James Ricalton, Peking, China., c. 1901, silver print by Underwood & Underwood, Department of Image Collections, National Gallery of Art Library, Washington, DC

By profession a school teacher, Ricalton's passion was travel photography. Every summer, while on vacation from his school, he embarked on journeys overseas using a wheelbarrow-like cart large enough to transport his photography equipment by day, and to sleep in by night. It was designed such that during rainy weather Ricalton could stand in a well in the middle and continue walking under the cart's cover. Using this system, he visited Iceland, the Amazon and the St. Petersburg region of Russia, bringing back thousands of photographs, mineral specimens, and curios. His voyages came to the attention of local inventor Thomas A. Edison, who financed an expedition to search the Far East for a bamboo filament suitable for use in the incandescent lamp. Ricalton took a one-year leave of absence from teaching, and departed the United States in February 1888, arriving in Ceylon on April 1, via the Suez Canal.

Ricalton visited every part of the island, testing hundreds of samples, and continuing on to British India, Singapore, China and Japan, becoming an expert in the properties of various types of bamboo. He returned home one year after his departure, with hundreds of samples for Edison, and recommendations on the two most suitable. This filament was used by Edison for nine months until the suitability of tungsten was discovered.

== Photographer ==
Ricalton was a prolific photographer, leaving over 100,000 images, among them a large collection of stereoscopic images. He quit his teaching job in 1891 to become a professional photographer and war correspondent with Underwood & Underwood. For the next 15 years he photographed and recorded events such the Spanish–American War (1898–1899) in the Philippines, during the Boxer Rebellion (1900) in China, and the Russo-Japanese War (1904–1905) in Manchuria. Seven of his Boxer Rebellion photographs were featured in the 23 September 1966 issue of LIFE. When Ricalton tried to take pictures of Japanese soldiers in trenches during the Port Arthur campaign, he was held in custody until Major Yamaoka of General Nogi's staff confirmed that the American photographer could take pictures of whatever he wanted.

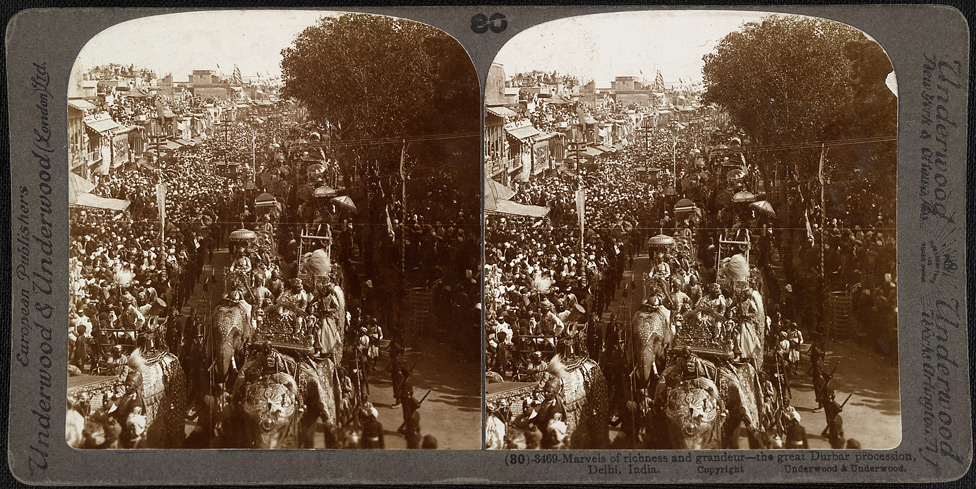
One of Ricalton's stereo photographs of a grand procession at the Delhi Durbar in 1903.

He was amongst the photographers who recorded the 1903 Delhi Durbar which celebrated the installation of Edward VII as Emperor of India.

Ricalton's photographs earned him numerous honors and many were used to illustrate textbooks. He sold his images to the American Museum of Natural History and the Metropolitan Museum of Art in New York. Many of his photographs were used by Underwood & Underwood to illustrate geography books.

In 1909, at age 65, he walked from Cape Town to Cairo, a distance of 4,500 miles averaging 30 miles a day. An extant diary confirms his daily itinerary through South Africa, Rhodesia, and Kenya.

In 1912, Ricalton was sent on another assignment by Edison to test a motion picture camera in Africa, filming among other things a whaling expedition off Cape Town. His son Lomond accompanied him on this trip but died from typhoid fever there, and this was Ricalton's last trip.

Ricalton retired to his home town of Waddington, New York, where he died October 28, 1929, at the age of 85.

== Selected works ==
- 1891 -- The City of the Sacred Bo-tree. (Anuradhapura). New York. OCLC 79749511
- 1900 -- India through the Stereoscope: A Journey through Hindustan. New York: Underwood & Underwood. OCLC 2954773
- 1901 -- China Through the Stereoscope: A Journey Through the Dragon Empire at the Time of the Boxer Uprising. New York: Underwood & Underwood. OCLC 5871769
- 1902 -- The Boxer Uprising, Cheefoo Taku, Tien-Tsin: A Part of Underwood & Underwood's Stereoscopic Tour through China. New York: Underwood & Underwood. OCLC 51404151
- 1905 -- A photographic record of the Russo-Japanese war, James H. Hare, editor. New York, P.F. Collier & Son. OCLC 728514
- 1907 -- India through the Stereoscope: A Journey through Hindustan. New York: Underwood & Underwood. OCLC 7296193
- 1910 -- India through the Stereoscope: A Journey through Hindustan. New York: Underwood & Underwood. OCLC 21566682
- 1990 -- James Ricalton's Photographic Travelogue of Imperial India, Christopher J. Lucas, editor. New York: Mellen. ISBN 978-0-88946-509-1; OCLC 22345020
- 2008 -- 美国摄影师的中国照片日记] (Meiguo she ying shi de Zhongguo zhao pian ri ji), Guangyu Xu, editor. Fuzou: Fujian Education Press (Fujian jiao yu chu ban she). ISBN 978-7-5334-5093-9; OCLC 370451773
