= Christian Fuscarino =

American community organizer (born c. 1990)

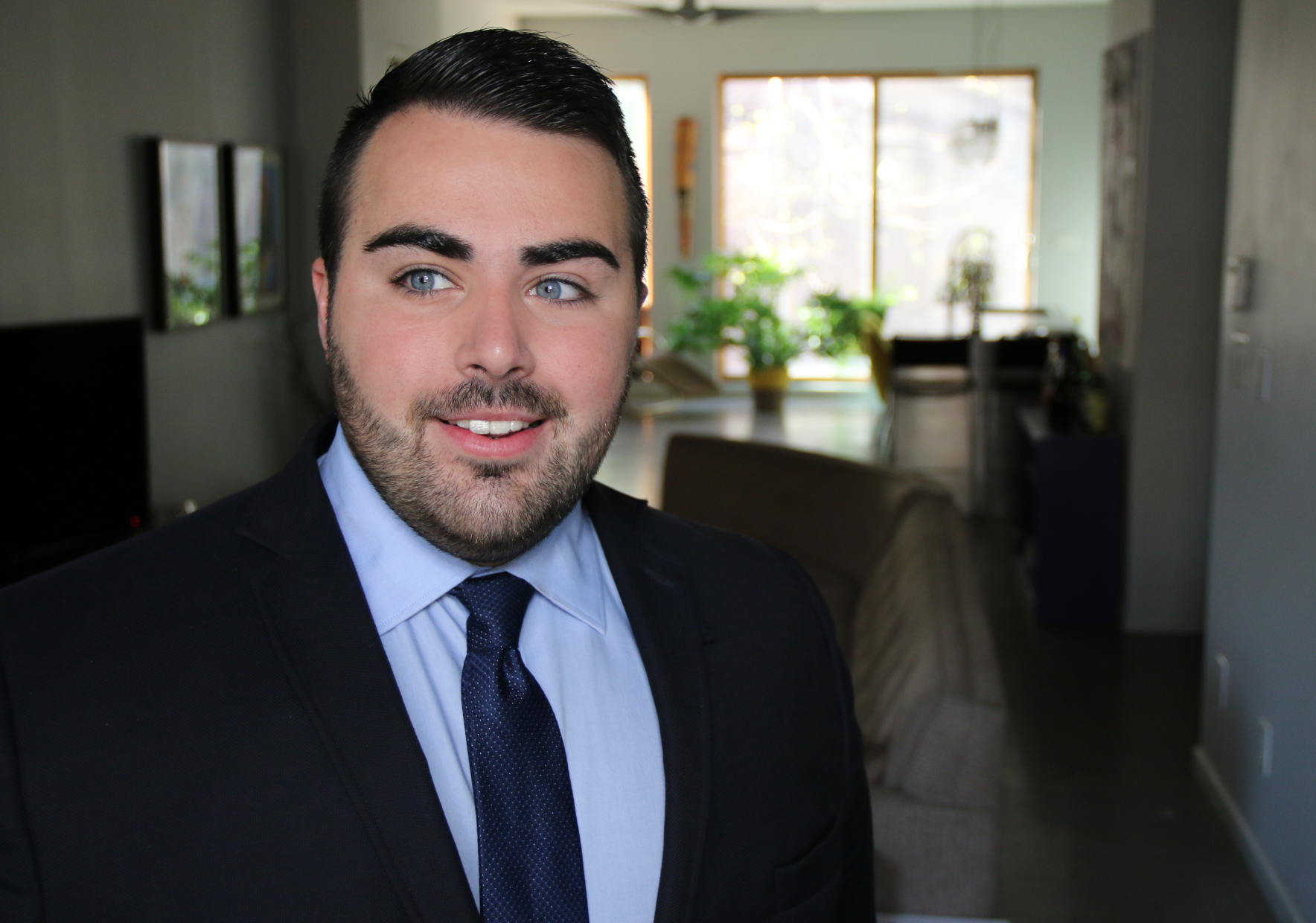
- Born: c. 1990 (age 35–36)
- Education: Hofstra University (BA)
- Political party: Democratic
- Spouse: Aaron Williams (m. 2018; sep. 2024)
- Website: Official website

Christian Fuscarino (born c. 1990) is a community organizer and LGBTQ activist who served as the executive director of Garden State Equality from 2016 to 2025. Since a young age Fuscarino has been involved in shaping public opinion and aiming to increase the rights for the LGBTQ community. In 2007, a public service announcement produced by Fuscarino won an Emmy award from the National Academy of Arts and Sciences for the way it approached the public perception of the LGBTQ community.

In 2008, he founded The Pride Network. Previously, he worked at the Hudson Pride Connections Center and in 2013, he joined Bend the Arc: A Jewish Partnership for Justice. He is also a frequent writer and contributor to The Huffington Post and NJ.com on LGBTQ related matters. He joined Garden State Equality in 2016. His work with the LGBT community led him to be recognized by PolitikerNJ and The New York Observer in their Power 100 list in 2016.

In November 2025, Fuscarino was arrested and initially charged with child endangerment and assault. Following public disclosure of the charges, he resigned as executive director of Garden State Equality. In March 2026, the assault charges were dropped, and Fuscarino entered a pre-trial intervention (PTI) program regarding the endangerment allegation, which included mandatory mental health treatment.

== Early life ==
Fuscarino grew up in Belmar, New Jersey. After moving to Maplewood, New Jersey, he attended Columbia High School, where he started organizing at local high schools. He studied at Hofstra University.

== Career ==
From a young age, Fuscarino has been an organizer and activist in the LGBT community. He began at GLSEN, an education network that aimed to improve students lives who were members of the LGBT community, by reducing discrimination and increasing knowledge through education. While at GLSEN, Fuscarino encouraged young LGBTQ students to start Gay-straight alliances in their schools.

Fuscarino joined the Pride Connections Center of New Jersey in 2007 as a program developer serving gay inner-city youth. He won a student Emmy award that year for his End the Silence public service announcement. In 2008 Fuscarino established the Pride Network, a national leadership development non-profit.

After running The Pride Network for a number of months, Fuscarino joined the non-profit Bend the Arc in 2013 as their digital strategist. Bend the Arc at the time was headed up by Alan van Capelle, who had previously served as executive director of Empire State Pride Agenda. While working with Bend the Arc, he and van Capelle launched a campaign, which played a major role in the signing of the Domestic Worker's Bill of Rights in California.

In 2016, it was announced that Fuscarino would become Garden State Equality's new executive director. Following the announcement, he was interviewed by The New York Observer, stating what he wanted to achieve as the new executive director. He stated, “people all over the country are wondering what an organization in a post-marriage state looks like. They’ll find out in New Jersey,” Mr. Fuscarino told PolitickerNJ. “Over the next few months we’ll roll out our plan to engage the LGBT community in a broader social justice movement.” As director Fuscarino said that he wanted to tackle issues such as curbing HIV transmissions, protecting LGBTQ youth from opiate addiction, and care for the elderly. Senator Cory Booker and Congressman Frank Pallone both publicly voiced their support for Fuscarino following the appointment.

After becoming the executive director for Garden State Equality, the PolitickerNJ listed Fuscarino in their Power 100. He was also second highest LGBTQ New Jersey–based activist and politician on the list. In March 2017, Fuscarino spoke to the press following an attack on the Garden State Equality building where a window was smashed, where the rainbow flag was displayed. The attack, was similar to one carried out earlier in the same year at the Equality Florida headquarters. Vice Media's Broadly website listed Fuscarino as the most influential activist in the state of New Jersey.

== Personal life ==
On November 11, 2018, Fuscarino married U.S. Marine and Neptune City, New Jersey councilman Aaron Williams in a traditional military ceremony at Trinity Church, an Episcopal parish in Asbury Park, NJ. The wedding, notable for taking place in the years following the repeal of "Don't Ask, Don't Tell", was attended by New Jersey Governor Phil Murphy and Congressman Frank Pallone, and received national coverage within the USA Today network. The couple later quietly separated in November 2024, while continuing to co-parent.

=== 2025 arrest ===
In November 2025, Fuscarino was arrested and initially charged with child endangerment and simple assault following an alleged incident with a foster child. According to an affidavit of probable cause, Fuscarino had disclosed to a resource worker weeks prior to authorities becoming involved that there had been "an episode of physical contact".

The two assault charges were dropped after a forensic interview conducted at the Monmouth County Child Advocacy Center found "no disclosure of physical abuse." Fuscarino subsequently entered a Pre-Trial Intervention (PTI) program, admitting to the allegation regarding the incident rather than entering a guilty plea to the endangerment charge. An initial court-issued no-contact order was lifted, leaving any determinations regarding future visitation strictly to the discretion of the New Jersey Division of Child Protection and Permanency (DCP&P). Upon the charges becoming public in December 2025, Garden State Equality initially placed Fuscarino on a leave of absence. Hours after several former executive directors of the organization published an open letter demanding his termination, Fuscarino officially resigned from his position as executive director.

== See also ==
- Garden State Equality
