= School Dance (film) =

2014 film by Nick Cannon

- Theatrical release poster
- Directed by: Nick Cannon
- Written by: Nick Cannon; Nile Evans
- Produced by: Nick Cannon; Michael Goldman
- Starring: Bobb'e J. Thompson; Luenell; Mike Epps; George Lopez; Lil Duval; Katt Williams; Kevin Hart; Wilmer Valderrama
- Cinematography: Michael Lohmann
- Edited by: Erik C. Anderson
- Music by: Geoff Zanelli
- Production company: N'Credible Entertainment
- Distributed by: Lionsgate
- Release date: July 2, 2014
- Running time: 86 minutes
- Country: United States
- Language: English

School Dance is a 2014 American musical comedy-drama film co-written, produced, and directed by Nick Cannon in his directorial debut. The film stars Bobb'e J. Thompson, Luenell, Mike Epps, George Lopez, Lil Duval, Katt Williams, Kevin Hart and Wilmer Valderrama. The film was released on July 2, 2014, in select theaters, VOD, and Digital HD.

== Plot ==
The film opens with a news broadcast about a teenager named Jason Jackson being shot outside the Monte Vista High School dance lock-in. Jason tells the story from the beginning, starting with him trying to get into the most popular dance clique in school, The Ranger$. They say he has to pass the initiation of getting a pair of panties from one of the Sweet Gyrls by midnight. Jason then decides that he is going to attempt to get a pair of panties from his longtime crush Anastacia during the school's lock-in.

Meanwhile, Day Day, one of the Ranger$ and Jason's older cousin, owes Anastacia's eldest brother Junior $2,000 by midnight due to Day Day's father Darren telling Junior that Day Day would have his money after losing to him in a game of dominoes. In his English class, Jason gives Anastacia a poem he wrote about her after she forgets to do the homework assignment only for the teacher to make her read it in front of the class, which everyone including Anastacia finds to be very great. After school is over, Anastacia gives Jason her number, so they can write a song together sometime.

Another subplot of the film follows two police officers Officer P'eniss and Lagney, who are chasing down the New Boyz who are on their way to the lock-in but get caught with weed brownies and "grape juice", which Officer Lagney consumes.

At the school dance lock-in, Jason, Anastacia, the Ranger$, and Sweet Gyrls play "seven minutes in heaven", but when it is Jason and Anastacia's turn, she tells him that she already knows his plan, and they decide to just stay friends. They later compete in a talent show to win $2,000 but when it comes to the Ranger$' performance, Jason finally beats his fear and raps to help them win the money. However, the Sweet Gyrls end up winning the prize money.

At midnight, Jason and the Ranger$ meet the Eses in the parking lot and are about to be killed until the wannabe gangsters start a drive-by shooting. Jason saves Anastacia, but is shot in the process. Jason is sent to the hospital and Anastacia goes with him, becomes his girlfriend, and gives the $2,000 prize money to Flaco.

The film ends with Jason's mother, Mamma Tawanna, coming into the parking lot with a gun, trying to figure out who shot Jason and breaks the fourth wall by showing Nick, the producers, and the crew then her shouting out at the audience.

== Cast ==
- Bobb'e J. Thompson as Jason Jackson
- Juliann Alexander as Julian
- Langston Higgins as Langston
- Dashawn Blanks as Darren Jr. (Day Day)
- Luenell as Mamma Tawanna Jackson
- Mike Epps as Principal Rogers
- George Lopez as Oscar
- Katt Williams as Darren
- Wilmer Valderrama as Flaco
- Tiffany Haddish as Trina
- Kristinia DeBarge as Anastacia
- Lil Duval as Bam-Bam
- Affion Crockett as Coach Fontaine
- Amber Rose as MaryWanna
- Efren Ramirez as El Matador
- Patrick Warburton as Prairie Puff Man
- Kevin Hart as OG Lil' Pretty Thug (uncredited)
- New Boyz as Themselves
- Melissa Molinaro as Tequila
- Kayla Collins as Big Booty Becky
- Jim Breuer as Officer Lagney
- Vivian Kindle as Mrs. Johnson
- Jessica Kirson as Officer P'eniss
- Nick Cannon as Super Sizer/Juicy/Himself
- DJ D-Wrek as himself
- Pete Davidson as Stinkfinger

== Home media ==
School Dance was released on DVD on October 7, 2014.

== See also ==
- List of hood films
