= Dean & Me =

2005 memoir by Jerry Lewis and James Kaplan

Dean & Me: (A Love Story)
- Author: Jerry Lewis, James Kaplan
- Language: English
- Publisher: Doubleday
- Publication date: November 2005
- Publication place: USA
- Media type: Print
- Pages: 340
- ISBN: 0-7679-2086-4

Dean & Me: (A Love Story) is a 2005 memoir by Jerry Lewis and James Kaplan, first published by Doubleday. There is an audiobook version read by Stephen Hoye.

== Summary ==
Jerry Lewis looks back on his relationship with Dean Martin, from their first meeting in 1945 through the years of their partnership, break-up, and eventual reconciliation, finishing with Martin's death in 1995. It is illustrated by black-and-white photographs throughout.

== Reviews ==
Kirkus Reviews says that while Lewis expresses "heartfelt admiration" of his former partner, "Martin’s character suffers the death of a thousand condescensions", and notes various ways in which the book reveals more about Lewis than his relationship with Martin. Their review of the audiobook calls it "balanced, even self-deprecating", and commends Hoye for his performance, supporting the decision to have someone other than Lewis narrate. In the Library Journal, Douglas King recommends the book for its quick pace, detail, characters, skilled mix of tones, and decision to focus more on Martin than Lewis.

Shawn Levy writes for The Guardian that Lewis's recollections are a "wobbly foundation" for nonfiction, but he does believe Lewis is "emotionally honest" and calls the tale of their relationship "a great story, a showbiz epic of brothers who find and then lose one another". Publishers Weekly compliments Lewis's storytelling and candor. Booklist's Kathleen Hughes similarly highlights the book's honesty and admiration, but adds that "[i]t may leave some readers wondering what Dean's side of the story would be".

Bruce Handy of Vanity Fair praises the book as "perceptive and entertaining", a retelling which is superior to its predecessors and possibly a future classic. Stephanie Zacharek says in The New York Times that it shows Lewis never recovered from the breakup with Martin, and that even after 50 years, he is still not sure why it happened the way it did. "This is a wild, joyous book," she writes, "but also a heartbreaking one."
