= Jessica Kirson =

American comedian and actress (born 1969)

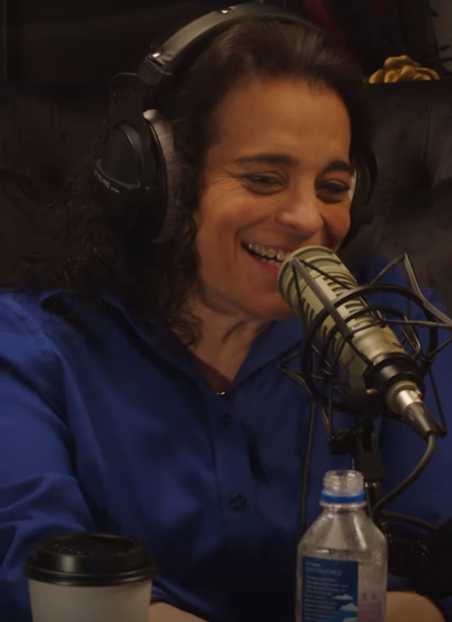
- Kirson in 2022
- Born: November 14, 1969 (age 56); South Orange, New Jersey, U.S.
- Education: University of Maryland, College Park (BS); New York University (MSW)
- Spouse: Danielle Sweeney (m. 2014; div. 2025)
- Children: 4
- Relatives: Zach Braff (stepbrother); Joshua Braff (stepbrother); Jennifer (sister)

TikTok information
- Page: jessicakirson
- Followers: 1.5M
- Last updated: 10 November 2025
- Website: Official website

Jessica Kirson (born November 14, 1969) is an American stand-up comedian, actress, and producer. Kirson is known for performing regularly at comedy venues in New York City, including Gotham Comedy Club, Laugh Factory, Caroline's, and the Improv.

== Early life ==
Kirson was born and raised in South Orange, New Jersey, and is of Jewish descent. Before her family moved from Europe to the United States, their last name was Kirschenbaum, which means 'cherry tree'. Her mother is a therapist who treated clients in Kirson's childhood home, which she has said has had a profound impact on her and her comedy.

Kirson graduated from Columbia High School in 1987. She described herself as a 'major class clown' who loved to make people laugh. Kirson is the stepsister of both actor Zach Braff and writer Joshua Braff, whose father married her mother when she was an adolescent. With the intention of becoming a therapist, Kirson graduated from the University of Maryland in family studies and from New York University with a Master of Social Work.

== Career ==
Kirson made her career debut in the 2014 film School Dance. Her one-hour special Talking to Myself debuted on Comedy Central in 2019, and was executive produced by Bill Burr. Other projects include her series The Call Girls with longtime friend and comedian Rachel Feinstein. In 2016, Kirson acted in and served as a consultant, producer, and writer on the Robert De Niro film The Comedian. Kirson was an executive producer and appeared in the documentary Hysterical which follows a group of female comedians, on and off stage.

Kirson has performed on The Tonight Show, The Tonight Show with Jay Leno, The View, and Kevin Can Wait. Kirson also hosts her own podcast, Disgusting Hawk. Kirson is also a contributor on The Howard Stern Show, where she produces and stars in prank calls for the program.

In her comedy, Kirson often narrates personal experiences of sobriety, her Jewish upbringing, and her identity as a lesbian, utilizing "gallows humor" and "biting, often crass asides". She sometimes performs inner monologues during her sets while facing away from the audience: "A lot of the jokes, when I turn around, I've said before, but I only do it at certain times, when a joke doesn't work or I get uncomfortable or something happens in the audience... That's my way of saving it in the moment." Commenting on her approach to comedy, Kirson said:

I don’t like being labeled as a type of comedian. I do all kinds of comedy. I’m just trying to be very real and honest and truthful. I try to entertain people as best as I can, because I feel like right now most people don’t like to think a lot. So, I go on and try to have it so that they don’t analyze and think a lot. I love doing characters, and I love putting out a message of tolerance that teaches people not to be mean, and to be more kind.

She has cited Lucille Ball and Carol Burnett among her comedic influences.

=== Riyadh Comedy Festival ===
In 2025, Kirson participated in Saudi Arabia's Riyadh Comedy Festival, an event which Human Rights Watch characterized as an attempt by the Saudi government to whitewash its human rights abuses. She was one of three women to agree to participate in the festival, which took place from September 26 to October 6. Kirson's performance took place on September 29. On October 5, she released a statement apologizing for her participation in the event, stating that despite being heartened by messages of support from attendees of what was likely the first comedy act with LGBTQ material in the country, she had donated her appearance fees to a human rights organization.

== Personal life ==
Kirson is a lesbian and has four children. She has been open about her struggle with food addiction as well as substance abuse throughout her life.

In June 2025, Kirson confirmed that she and her wife, Danielle Sweeney, were in the process of divorcing after more than a decade of marriage. She discussed the separation on the podcast First Date with Lauren Compton, and had previously alluded to the process in a 2024 episode of Guys We F****d.

== Filmography ==
=== Film ===
Year	Title	Role	Notes
2014	School Dance	Officer P'eniss	
2016	The Comedian	Herself	Also associate producer
2020	The King of Staten Island	Female Pharmacy Owner	
2020	The Binge	Karyn Friedlander	
2025	Are We Good?	Herself	Documentary

=== Television ===
Year	Title	Role	Notes
2011	Bubble Guppies	Voice roles (various)	2 episodes
2015	The Jim Gaffigan Show	Pam	Episode: "Super Great Daddy Day"
2016	Kevin Can Wait	Megan	Episode: "Hallow-We-Ain't-Home"
2018	Dollar Store Therapist	Jessica	Episode: "Self-Pleasure"
2018–2019	Crashing	Herself	3 episodes
2019	Bill Burr Presents: Jessica Kirson Talking to Myself	Herself	TV special
2020	Ramy	Homeless Woman	Episode: "Little Omar"

== Discography ==
Year	Title	Label
2007	My Cookie's Gone	Self-release
2020	Prank Calls EP	Virtual Comedy Network
2020	Talking to Myself	Virtual Comedy Network
2021	The Call Girls with Rachel Feinstein	Virtual Comedy Network
