= Shan K. Bagby =

United States Army General

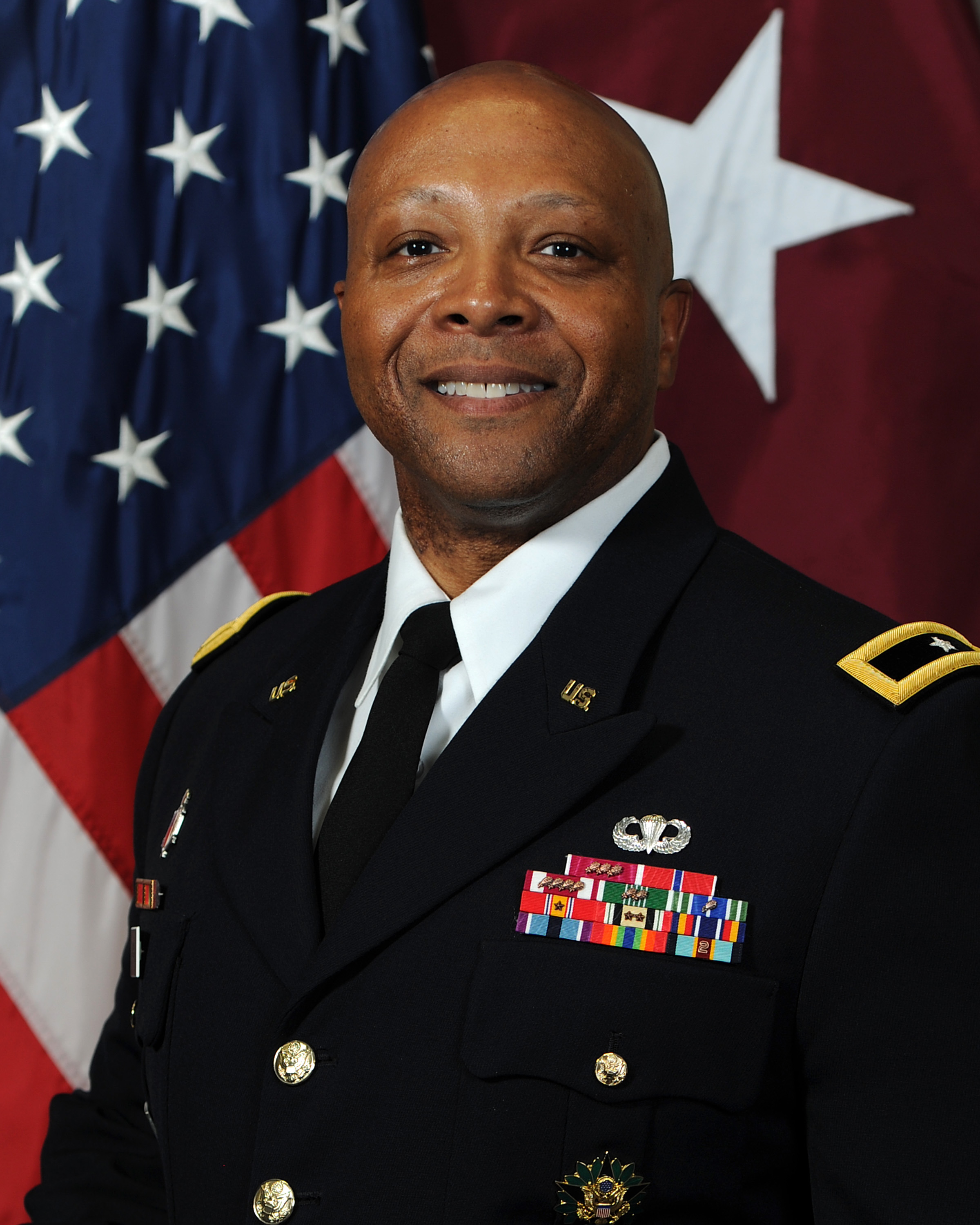
- Military career
- Allegiance: United States
- Branch: United States Army
- Rank: Brigadier General
- Commands: Chief of the Army Dental Corps; Regional Health Command-Central; Brooke Army Medical Center
- Conflicts: Iraq War
- Awards: Legion of Merit (4); Bronze Star Medal

Shan K. Bagby is a United States Army brigadier general and the 28th Chief of the Army Dental Corps. Bagby also serves as the Commanding General, Regional Health Command-Central. Bagby, an oral and maxillofacial surgeon, was the Army's first Foundational Black American dental officer promoted to brigadier general.

Bagby, a commissioned officer for more than 30 years, has held many command and staff positions. Of note, Bagby served as Commanding General, Brooke Army Medical Center, the Military Health System's largest and most complex hospital and sole Level I Trauma Center. He previously served as Deputy Commanding General (Support) for United States Army Medical Command, working directly for the United States Army Surgeon General and Commanding General, United States Army Medical Command. Additionally, Bagby served as the Commander, 561st Medical Company (Dental Services), executing the dental support mission in the Northern Iraq Theater of Operations, supporting 75,000 coalition forces, civilians and local nationals.

Bagby currently serves as Commanding General to more than 23,000 personnel assigned to Regional Health Command-Central, which supports over 500,000 beneficiaries in eight states. Additionally, dual-hatted as Chief of the Army Dental Corps, Bagby is the principal advisor to the Army Surgeon General on all matters relating to military dentistry, ensuring the oral health readiness of the force and a trained dental force for worldwide deployment. Bagby is a Fellow of the American Association of Oral and Maxillofacial Surgeons and Board Certified by the American Board of Oral and Maxillofacial Surgery.

== Early life and education ==
Bagby enrolled in the ROTC at Rutgers University, where he received a Bachelor of Arts degree in physics. He also participated in the Reserve Officers Training Corps (ROTC) program at Rutgers and received a commission as a second lieutenant in the United States Army Reserve upon graduation in May 1989.

Bagby earned a Doctor of Dental Medicine from the University of Pittsburgh School of Dental Medicine, followed by an internship and residency in oral and maxillofacial surgery from Martin Luther King Jr./Drew Medical Center, Los Angeles, California, and a fellowship in oral and maxillofacial surgery (trauma) at the University of Texas Health Science Center at Houston, Texas. He earned his Master of Healthcare Administration from Baylor University in Waco, Texas, and a master's degree in Strategic Studies from the U.S. Army War College in Carlisle, Pennsylvania. Bagby is a fellow of the American Association of Oral and Maxillofacial Surgeons and is board certified by the American Board of Oral and Maxillofacial Surgery.

Bagby is also a member of the Association of Military Surgeons of the United States (AMSUS), Association of the U.S. Army, Baylor University Alumni Association, Rutgers University Alumni Association, University of Pittsburgh Alumni Association, American College of Oral and Maxillofacial Surgeons, American College of Dentists, American College of Healthcare Executives, American Dental Association and Veterans of Foreign Wars.

== Military career ==
Bagby has held a variety of command and staff positions and rising to the rank of brigadier general.

Bagby's military training began in the Reserve Officers' Training Corps (ROTC) during college. Upon graduation, he received a commission as an Army second lieutenant in 1989 and transferred to the active component in 1997.

After attending the U.S. Army Medical Department Officer Basic Course at Fort Sam Houston, Texas, Bagby was assigned to DeWitt Army Community Hospital, Fort Belvoir, Virginia as officer-in-charge for the Hospital Dental Clinic, while also serving as a residency mentor and attending staff oral surgeon at Walter Reed Army Medical Center in Washington, D.C.

Bagby next became the assistant program director and the attending staff oral surgeon for the U.S. Army Dental Activity at Fort Sam Houston, which involved teaching and the administration of the Brooke Army Medical Center Oral and Maxillofacial Residency Program.

Bagby moved overseas in 2005 to serve for three years as the Commander, 561st Medical Company (Dental Services) in Grafenwoehr, Germany. While there he led a team of Soldiers to provide Combat Health Service Support. He also executed the dental support mission in the Northern Iraq Theater of Operations, overseeing eight dental facilities and supporting 75,000 coalition forces, civilians and local nationals.

He returned to Fort Sam Houston in 2008 for several assignments to include Staff Oral and Maxillofacial Surgeon for the U.S. Army Dental Activity, Baylor Health Administration Resident, and Brooke Army Medical Center's Program Director for the Oral and Maxillofacial Surgery Residency Program.

In 2012, Bagby became Chief, Dental Corps Branch, Army Human Resources Command, Fort Knox, Kentucky, responsible for the career management of more than 1,670 active duty and Reserve dental officers across nine areas of concentration.

After a year at the U.S. Army War College in Carlisle Barracks, Pennsylvania, Bagby became the Commander, U.S. Army Dental Activity on Joint Base Lewis-McChord, Washington, where he was responsible for the delivery of dental services to over 40,000 eligible beneficiaries at seven dental treatment facilities.

In 2017, Bagby became the Deputy Chief of Staff and Troop Commander for the Office of the Surgeon General, Defense Health Headquarters in Falls Church, Virginia. As Deputy Chief of Staff, Bagby was responsible for the administration of a headquarters of over 3,200 employees supporting six major subordinate commands, expending $12B annually and supporting healthcare delivery services to 1.5 million beneficiaries worldwide. As Troop Commander, Bagby supervised the Headquarters Company and Detachment Commands which oversaw the training and discipline of 300 military personnel assigned or attached to the Office of the Surgeon General and U.S. Army Medical Command Headquarters.

In 2018, Bagby became the Deputy Chief of Staff for Support (G-1/4/6) for the U.S. Army Medical Command, and the 28th Chief of the U.S. Army Dental Corps. As Deputy Chief of Staff for Support, Bagby provided executive oversight of U.S. Army Medical Command Personnel (Military and Civilian Human Resources), Logistics, Information Management/Information Technology, Medical Informatics and Talent Management. As Chief of the Army Dental Corps, Bagby is the principal advisor to the Army Surgeon General on all matters relating to military dentistry, ensuring the oral health readiness of the force and a trained dental force for worldwide deployment. Additionally, Bagby responsible for the career management of active component and Army Reserve dental officers in 11 areas of concentration (AOCs) in the ranks of Captain (O-3) through Colonel (O-6).

On May 24, 2018, the Senate confirmed the nomination of Bagby to be promoted to brigadier general. Bagby's historic promotion as the first black Army dental officer to become a general officer took place on Sept. 1, 2018. “I stand on the shoulders of great ancestors in the past and great mentors in the present of every gender, every race, every nationality and every walk of life.” Bagby said during his promotion ceremony.

He recently served as Deputy Commanding General (Support) for U.S. Army Medical Command, working directly for the U.S. Army Surgeon General and Commanding General, U.S. Army Medical Command.

On June 26, 2020, Bagby again made history as the first African-American Commanding General of Brooke Army Medical Center. As the BAMC Commanding General, Bagby led more than 8,500 military and civilian personnel, caring for over 240,000 military members, military retirees and their families throughout the greater San Antonio area. He also served as Deputy Market Director, San Antonio Military Health System.

On May 6, 2021, Bagby became the Commanding General, Regional Health Command-Central. As Commanding General, Bagby oversees more than 23,000 personnel assigned to RHC-C, which supports over 500,000 beneficiaries in eight states. He also continues to serve as the Chief, U.S. Army Dental Corps.

== Awards and honors ==
=== Badges ===
Army Parachutist Badge

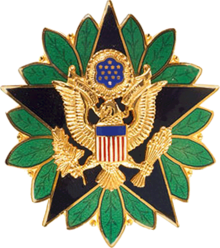
Army Staff Identification Badge

=== Medals ===
Legion of Merit with three oak leaf clusters
Bronze Star Medal
Meritorious Service Medal with three oak leaf clusters
Army Commendation Medal with two oak leaf clusters
Army Achievement Medal with one oak leaf cluster
Meritorious Unit Commendation
National Defense Service Medal
Iraq Campaign Medal with two bronze service stars
Armed Forces Service Medal
Humanitarian Service Medal
Global War on Terrorism Service Medal
Overseas Service Ribbon (2 awards)

Army Surgeon General’s “A” Proficiency Designator

Member of the Order of Military Medical Merit

== Publications and manuscripts ==
- Bagby SK; Examining Intuition's Role as a Decision Making Tool for Military Leaders. United States Army War College Class of 2015 Strategy Research Project.
- Bagby SK; Acute Management of Facial Burns. Oral & Maxillofacial Surg Clin N Am 2005 Aug; 17(3):267-72
- Patterson AL, Bagby SK; Posterior Vertical Body Osteotomy (PVBO): A Predictable Rescue Procedure for Proximal Segment Fracture During Sagittal Split Ramus Osteotomy of the Mandible. Journal of Oral Maxillofacial Surgery 1999 Apr; 57(4): 475–7
- Black E, Atchison K, Shetty V, Leathers R, Bagby S, Delrahim S: The Relationship of Substance Abuse to Orofacial Injuries in an Inner City Population. Int. J Oral Biology 1998; 23, 47 – 52
- Bagby SK, Rutherford FC, Gleason-Jordan IO; Solid-Type Gastrointestinal Epithelial Choristoma of the Tongue: Report of a Case. Journal of Oral Maxillofacial Surgery 1998 Aug; 56(8): 988-90
- Bagby SK, Black E; Substance Abuse and Its Relationship to Orofacial Injuries in an Inner City Population. National Institute for Dental Research Abstracts 1997 Jan
