= South Orange-Maplewood School District =

School district in Essex County, New Jersey, US

Address
- 525 Academy Street Maplewood, Essex County, New Jersey, 07040; United States
- Coordinates: 40.736009°N 74.264678°W

District information
- Grades: PreK–12
- Superintendent: Jason Bing
- Business administrator: Imani Moody
- Schools: 11

Students and staff
- Enrollment: 7,353 (as of 2019–20)
- Faculty: 576.1 FTEs
- Student–teacher ratio: 12.8:1

Other information
- District Factor Group: I
- Website: www.somsdk12.org
Ind.	Per pupil	District spending	Rank (*)	K–12 average	%± vs. average
1A	Total Spending	$18,655	56	$18,891	−1.2%
1	Budgetary Cost	14,565	53	14,783	−1.5%
2	Classroom Instruction	8,589	49	8,763	−2.0%
6	Support Services	2,356	54	2,392	−1.5%
8	Administrative Cost	1,513	63	1,485	1.9%
10	Operations & Maintenance	1,859	72	1,783	4.3%
13	Extracurricular Activities	200	32	268	−25.4%
16	Median Teacher Salary	74,760	88	64,043
Data from NJDoE 2014 Taxpayers' Guide to Education Spending. *Of K–12 districts with more than 3,500 students. Lowest spending=1; Highest=103

The South Orange-Maplewood School District is a regional public school district, serving students in pre-kindergarten through twelfth grade from the suburban communities of South Orange and Maplewood, two municipalities in Essex County, in the U.S. state of New Jersey.

As of the 2019–20 school year, the district, comprised of 11 schools, had an enrollment of 7,353 students and 576.1 classroom teachers (on an FTE basis), for a student–teacher ratio of 12.8:1.

== History ==
The school district has operated as a unified organization for the area since 1867 and under the current name since 1894. James Ricalton, a teacher, photographer and world traveler born in New York of Scottish parents who became the school district's first permanent teacher, helped set the high standard of education that persists in the school district to this day.

In October 2014, the American Civil Liberties Union filed a complaint against the South Orange-Maplewood School District in relation to its academic leveling and disciplinary systems, stating that the overuse of discipline and "zero-tolerance" policy, and implicit racial bias within the level selection system violate Title VI of the Civil Rights Act of 1964 and Section 504 of the Rehabilitation Act of 1973.

The district had been classified by the New Jersey Department of Education as being in District Factor Group "I", the second-highest of eight groupings. District Factor Groups organize districts statewide to allow comparison by common socioeconomic characteristics of the local districts. From lowest socioeconomic status to highest, the categories are A, B, CD, DE, FG, GH, I and J.

In 1982, the District "paired" Marshall and Jefferson Elementary Schools to help achieve racial balance. K-2 students attended Marshall, and grades 3-5 attended Jefferson. In 1999, Seth Boyden Elementary was designated a Demonstration School with limited in-district zoning and a reliance on attracting students from other neighborhoods. The purpose was socioeconomic balance and reduction of overcrowding in other district schools.

In 2020, the district embarked on its "Intentional Integration Initiative", which buses students from all district neighborhoods, so that the socioeconomic demographics at each elementary school match the district as a whole. The 2021 Kindergarten class was the first cohort in this plan.

== Awards and recognition ==
For the 1992–93 school year, Columbia High School received the National Blue Ribbon Award of Excellence from the United States Department of Education, the highest honor that an American school can achieve.

The NAMM Foundation named the district in its 2009 survey of the "Best Communities for Music Education", which included 124 school districts nationwide.

== Schools ==
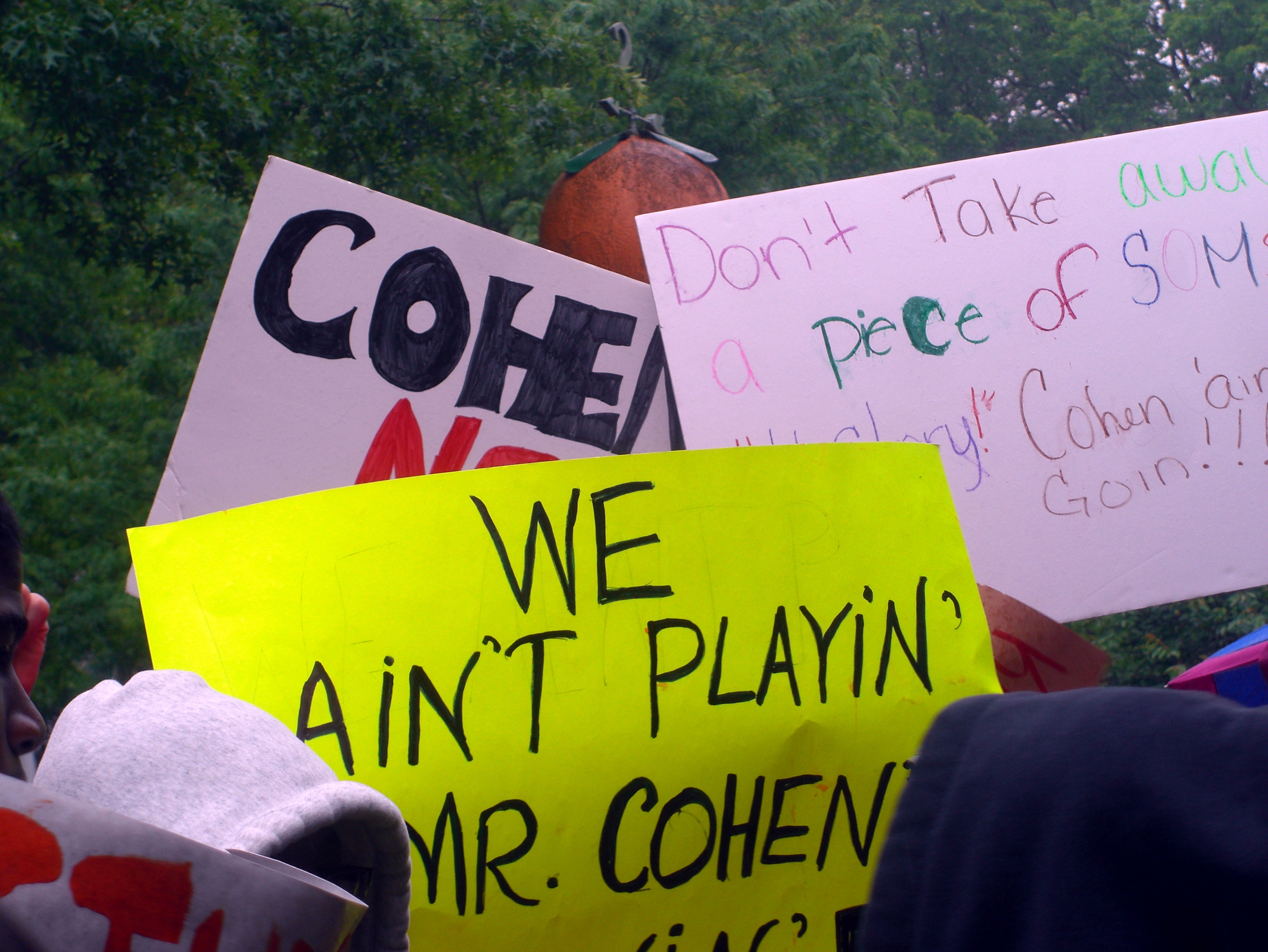
A South Orange Middle School student protest

Schools in the district (with 2019–20 school enrollment data from the National Center for Education Statistics) are:

Preschool

- Montrose Early Childhood Center (133 students, in PreK; located in Maplewood)
  - Bonita Samuels, principal

Elementary schools

- Seth Boyden Elementary Demonstration School (493 students, in grades K–5 located in Maplewood)
  - Shannon Glander, principal
- Clinton Elementary School (605, K–5; Maplewood)
  - Jennifer Connors, principal
- Delia Bolden Elementary School (544, 3–5; Maplewood). The school, formerly known as Jefferson Elementary School, was renamed in 2022 in honor of Delia Bolden, who graduated in 1912 as the first African-American woman to graduate from Columbia High School.
  - Kimberly Hutchinson, principal
- Marshall Elementary School (518, K–2; South Orange)
  - Raquel Horn, principal
- South Mountain Elementary School (647, K–5; South Orange)
  - Kevin Mason, principal
- South Mountain Elementary School Annex (NA, K–1; South Orange)
  - Kevin Mason, principal
- Tuscan Elementary School (K–5, 637; Maplewood)
  - Malikah Majeed, principal

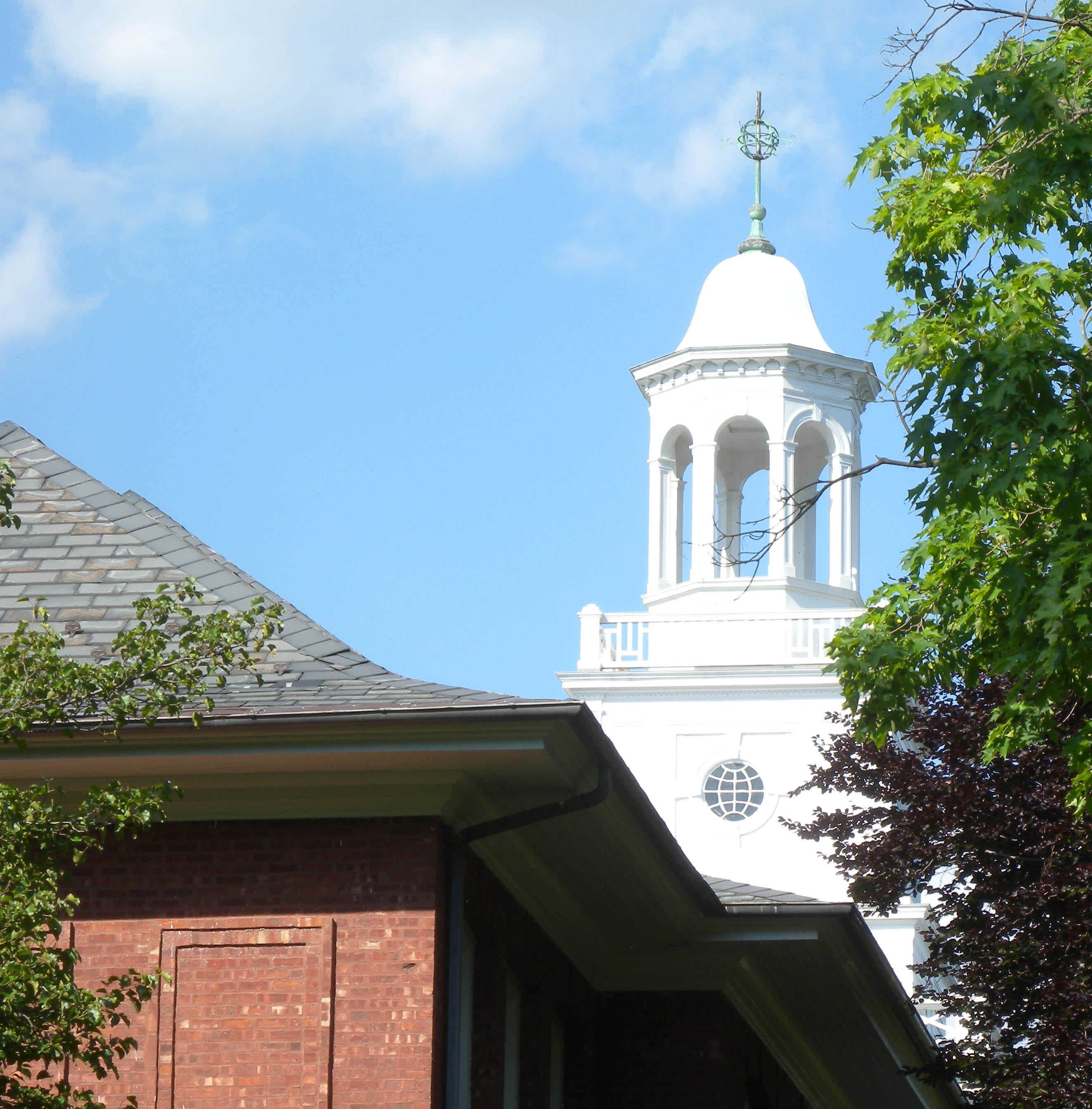
Maplewood Middle School

Middle schools

- Maplewood Middle School (827, 6–8; Maplewood)
  - Dara Gronau, principal
- South Orange Middle School (786, 6–8; South Orange)
  - Lynn Irby, principal

High school

- Columbia High School (1,967, 9–12; Maplewood)
  - Frank Sanchez, principal

== Administration ==
Members of the district administration are:

- Jason Bing, superintendent
- Imani Moody, school business administrator and board secretary

Kevin Gilbert had been named as acting superintendent in November 2023 after the former superintendent Ronald Taylor was place on administrative leave through the end of his contract in June 2024.

== Board of education ==
The district's board of education, comprised of nine members, sets policy and oversees the fiscal and educational operation of the district through its administration. As a Type II school district, the board's trustees are elected directly by voters to serve three-year terms of office on a staggered basis, with three seats up for election each year held (since 2013) as part of the November general election. The board appoints a superintendent to oversee the district's day-to-day operations and a business administrator to supervise the business functions of the district. The district's tax levy is approved by an eight-member Board of School Estimate, which includes two members of the district's board of education and three elected officials each from Maplewood and South Orange.
