= Fujian Education Press =

Chinese publishing company

Fujian Education Press (Chinese: 福建教育出版社) is publisher in Fuzhou in the Chinese province of Fujian. Founded in December 1958, it is run by the Fujian Provincial Department of Education. In the midst the Cultural Revolution, the publisher closed in 1966 but was reestablished in 1978 following the third plenary session of the 11th Central Committee of the Chinese Communist Party.
