= Carmen Lynch =

Spanish-American comedian, actress and writer

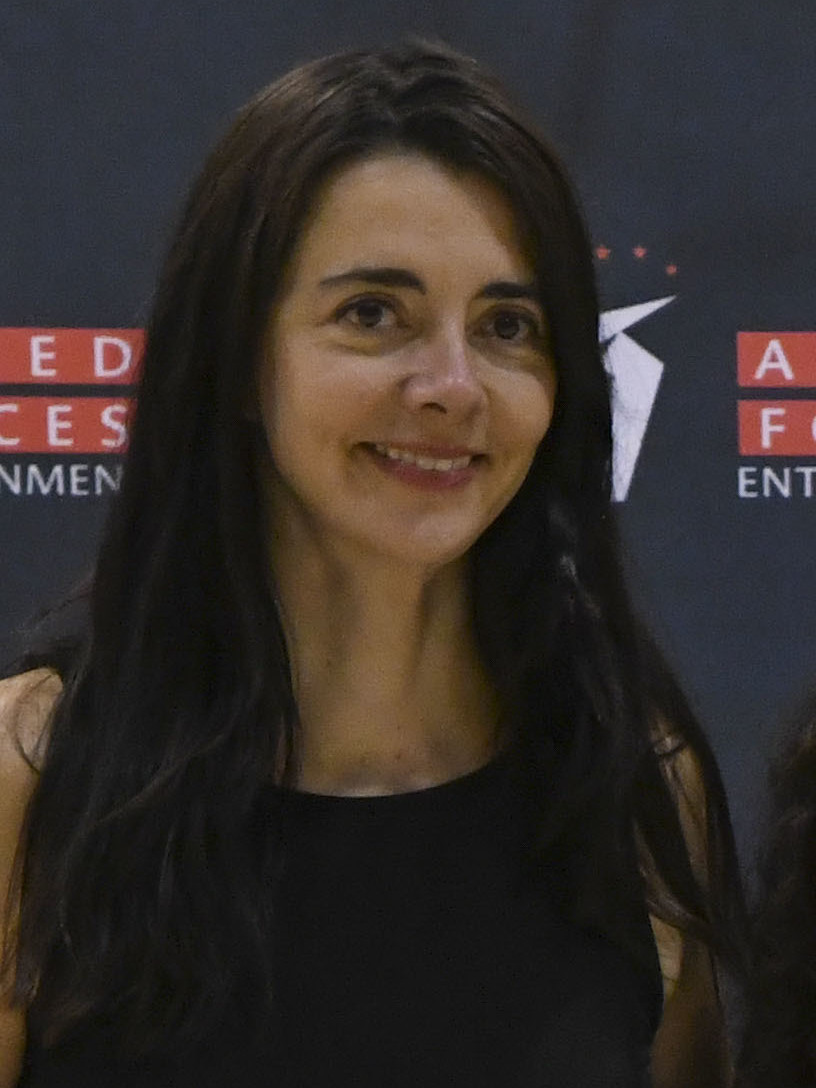
- Lynch in 2022
- Born: Carmen Michelle Lynch; January 17, 1972 (age 54); California, U.S.
- Website: carmenlynch.com

Carmen Lynch (born January 17, 1972) is a Spanish-American (Note: Her mother is from Spain, and her father is American.) stand-up comedian, actress, and writer based in New York City.

== Career ==
=== Stand-up comedy ===
Lynch has performed in both English and Spanish in the United States and Spain. She participated in NBC's Last Comic Standing twice, both times making it to the final rounds. She was also a finalist in the Laughing Skull Comedy Festival.

Lynch has performed for American troops in Iraq and Kuwait. In 2017, her comedy routine and album, Dance Like You Don't Need the Money, was named by The New York Times as "one of five to stream" and was voted the number one comedy album of the year by SiriusXM.

=== Television ===
Lynch has appeared on The Tonight Show Starring Jimmy Fallon, Conan, Inside Amy Schumer, Last Comic Standing, The Late Show with David Letterman, The Late Show with Stephen Colbert, @midnight, and A Prairie Home Companion. She has also appeared in the television series The Good Wife.

=== Film ===
Lynch has appeared in films including Amira & Sam (2014), Carmen (2017), and Wanda Sykes Presents Herlarious (2013).

=== Other work ===
She is a co-creator of the video web series, Apt C3, with comedian Liz Miele and photographer Chris Vongsawat.
