= Joseph Scheuerle =

American painter

- Born: March 15, 1873; Vienna, Austria
- Died: March 25, 1948 (aged 75); South Orange, New Jersey, US
- Education: Art Academy of Cincinnati
- Occupations: Artist, illustrator
- Known for: Painting
- Spouse: Carolyn Lohrey
- Children: 1

Joseph Scheuerle (March 15, 1873 – March 25, 1948) was an American painter and illustrator best known for his portraits of Native Americans.

== Early life and education ==
Scheuerle was born in Vienna, Austria. His family immigrated to the United States in 1882 and settled in Cincinnati, Ohio. His parents enrolled him at a local school, but when the teachers found out that he spoke no English, they had him sit in the back, leaving him free to draw. Scheuerle attended the Art Academy of Cincinnati where he studied under Joseph Henry Sharp and Henry Farny.

== Artistic career ==
Scheuerle graduated in 1896 and found work drawing circus and Wild West posters for the Strobridge Lithographing Company. He moved to Chicago in 1900 where he continued his work as an illustrator. In 1904, he married his wife, Carolyn Lohrey. They couple had one daughter, Margaret, born in July 1906. During this period of his life, the artist began to meet and to paint portraits of Native American performers who traveled with Buffalo Bill's Wild West show. His portraits were, in his words, "all finished and done honestly and carefully from life and on the spot."

In the summer of 1909, Scheuerle traveled west to the Pine Ridge Reservation in South Dakota. He painted portraits of several Sioux people, including the Lakota leader Red Cloud, who was nearly ninety years old at the time. In 1910, Louis W. Hill met Scheuerle and hired him to create promotional art for the Great Northern Railway, including the railway's mountain goat logo. That summer, Scheuerle's work for the Great Northern took him to Glacier National Park in Montana. On the trip, he took the opportunity to visit the Blackfeet Indian Reservation, the Crow Indian Reservation, and the Little Bighorn Battlefield, painting portraits of people he met. Throughout his career, Scheuerle continued to visit tribes in Montana, Oregon, and Washington. He produced more than two hundred portraits of Native American people along with hundreds of sketches and illustrated letters.

From his first visit west, Scheuerle became aware of the oppression endured by native people. He often wrote notes on the backs of his paintings, documenting the circumstances under which he made them. His notes are witness the poverty of his subjects and sometimes tell their stories. His concern led him to create art that criticized popular attitudes and U.S. policies toward Native Americans. Activist Carlos Montezuma used Scheuerle's art to illustrate articles published by the Society of American Indians.

== Death and legacy ==
Scheuerle kept most of his portraits in his own collection. In 1944, Thomas Gilcrease made him an offer to buy the collection, but Scheuerle refused. After the artist's death from a heart attack, his work passed into private collections. The Montana Historical Society has since acquired some of his paintings and hosted major exhibitions of his work in 1973, 2008, and 2018. In 2000, the Cincinnati Art Galleries displayed an exhibition titled Joseph Scheuerle and His Indian Art Gallery.

A resident of South Orange, New Jersey, he died at his home there on March 25, 1948, at the age of 75.
