= Joshua Braff =

American writer

- Born: October 11, 1967 (age 58); South Orange, New Jersey, U.S.
- Other name: Josh Braff
- Education: New York University (BS); Saint Mary's College of California (MFA)
- Occupation: Writer
- Years active: 1991–present
- Relatives: Zach Braff (brother); Jessica Kirson (stepsister)
- Website: joshuabraff.com

Joshua Braff (born October 11, 1967) is an American writer.

== Biography ==
Braff's first novel, The Unthinkable Thoughts of Jacob Green, described as a Jewish coming of age tale, was published in 2004 by Algonquin Books of Chapel Hill. The Unthinkable Thoughts of Jacob Green was an ALA Notable Book, named to Booklist's Top ten 1st Novels List, and chosen for the Barnes & Noble Discover Great New Writers program. His second novel Peep Show was published by Algonquin in 2010. In a four-star review of Peep Show, People said, “Braff skillfully illuminates the failures and charms of a broken family. That teen longing for adults to act their age haunts long after the final page.”

Braff's third novel, The Daddy Diaries, was published on May 5, 2015. Novelist Adam Langer praised the novel: “Honest and heartfelt, Joshua Braff’s novel about the perils of twenty-first century fatherhood contains more moments of truth than several hundred bestselling memoirs or self-help books. The wry humor and compulsive readability may remind readers of Jonathan Tropper or Nick Hornby, but the hard-won wisdom and disarming vulnerability in “The Daddy Diaries” is all Braff's own.”

Braff grew up in South Orange, New Jersey and attended Columbia High School. He graduated from New York University in 1991 with a BS in Education. In 1995 Braff entered Saint Mary's College of California where he earned an MFA in creative writing/fiction. He contributed a short work titled "Exit 15W" to the collection of shorts about New Jersey entitled Living on the Edge of the World after his hometown of South Orange.

Joshua is the older brother of actor-director Zach Braff. His father was born Jewish and his mother, originally Protestant, converted to Judaism.
