= National Association of Epilepsy Centers =

Association of academic departments of epilepsy in the United States

The National Association of Epilepsy Centers is an association of Comprehensive Epilepsy Centers - academic departments of epilepsy in the United States that meets certain criteria and has certain resources available for the care of the most complicated patients with epilepsy. It is based in Washington DC.
