= Peter W. Kaplan =

American newspaper editor

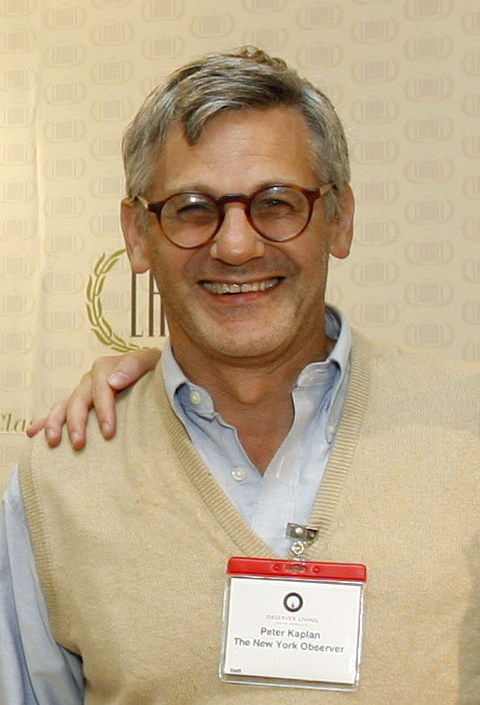
- Kaplan in 2008
- Born: Peter Wennik Kaplan; February 10, 1954; South Orange, New Jersey, U.S.
- Died: November 29, 2013 (aged 59); New York City, U.S.
- Education: Harvard University
- Occupation: Newspaper editor
- Family: James Kaplan (brother)

Peter Wennik Kaplan (February 10, 1954 – November 29, 2013) was an American editor known for modernizing New Journalism for the digital age. He was the editor-in-chief of the New York Observer, a weekly newspaper, for 15 years. The Kingdom of New York, an anthology of articles from the paper, was co-edited by Kaplan.

In 2010, he worked as the editorial director of Fairchild Publications' Fairchild Fashion Group, where he helped oversee the relaunch of M, a men's magazine, and oversaw Women's Wear Daily, Footwear News, Menswear, the newly formed Fairchild books division, and other ventures.

== Early life and education ==
Kaplan was born to a Jewish family in South Orange, New Jersey, the son of Roberta (née Wennik) and Robert Edward Kaplan. Both his parents were from New York City. His mother was a psychotherapist and his father was the owner and president of clothing manufacturer Complex Industries Corp. While at Columbia High School he joined the newspaper, The Columbian. He had two brothers, the writer James Kaplan and Rob Kaplan, a network executive at NBC and CBS and business owner. He went on to obtain his degree from Harvard University in 1976. His college roommate was Robert F. Kennedy, Jr., son of the late attorney general and senator Robert F. Kennedy.

== Career ==
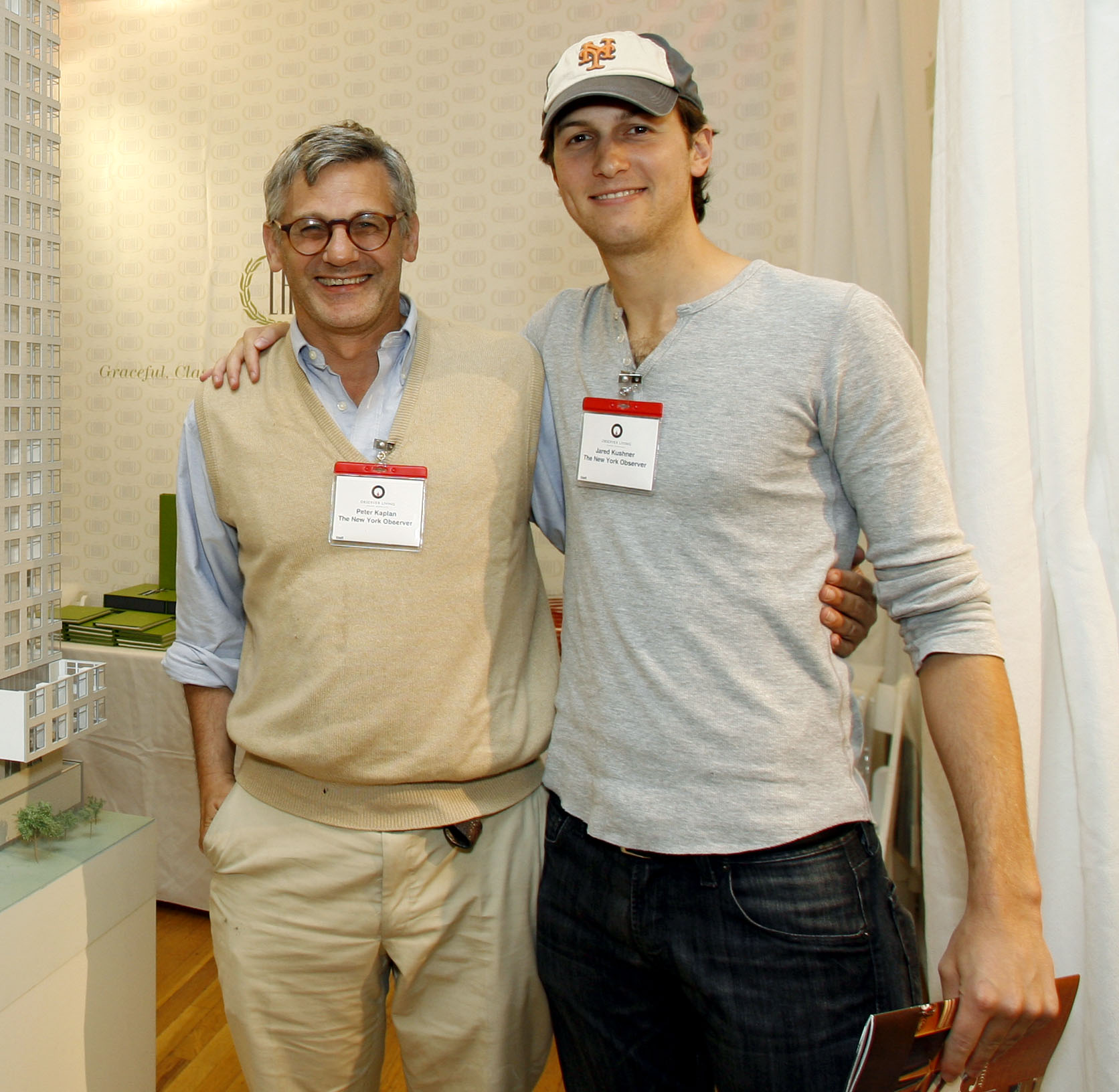
Kaplan with Jared Kushner, then owner of the New York Observer

Kaplan's early career started at The New York Times, Esquire and Manhattan, inc. magazine where he served under both editors, Jane Amsterdam and Clay Felker.

In the early 1990s he served as an editorial director at Condé Nast Traveler and a producer at The Charlie Rose Show. He then served as editor-in-chief of the New York Observer, from 1994 to 2009.

At the Observer, Kaplan worked with the following writers:

- Gossip columnist Frank DiGiacomo
- New York Times book critic Alexandra Jacobs
- New Yorker staff writer Nick Paumgarten
- Choire Sicha, the founder of The Awl
- Candace Bushnell—whose column "Sex and the City," which Kaplan named himself, became a pop culture sensation even as the paper that printed it remained relatively obscure.
- Gabriel Sherman, the media reporter who chronicled Fox News Chairman Roger Ailes' effect on presidential politics in his book, The Loudest Voice in the Room. Sherman is now national affairs editor at New York magazine.
- Sunday New York Post editor and New York Post Managing Editor Lauren Ramsby
- New York Times Editor and writer Jim Windolf

== Media appearances ==
On November 6, 2009, Kaplan appeared on The Charlie Rose Show, where he discussed the future of newspapers with regards to the Internet and mobile devices such as the Amazon Kindle, and Apple's iPad.

Two former editors from the New York Observer, Peter Stevenson and Jim Windolf, turned Kaplan into a Twitter character with two personalities, "Wise Kaplan" and "Cranky Kaplan," followed by insiders in the New York journalism community.

== Personal ==
He died of cancer in New York City on November 29, 2013, according to his second wife, Lisa Chase, an editor at Elle. The couple had a son named Davey. His first marriage was to Audrey Walker; they had three children: Caroline, Charlie and Peter Kaplan. Services were held at the Larchmont Temple.
