= Ken Bloom (physicist) =

American particle physicist

- Born: South Orange, New Jersey, US
- Spouse: Sarah Kelen (m. 2006)

Academic background
- Education: AB, physics, University of Chicago; MS, PhD, Cornell University

Kenneth Arthur Bloom is an American particle physicist. He is a full professor at the University of Nebraska–Lincoln and an Elected Fellow of the American Physical Society.

== Early life and education ==
Bloom was born to parents Estelle Bloom and Dr. Joel N. Bloom. Raised in South Orange, New Jersey, he attended Columbia High School, where he was captain of the school's physics team. He graduated with honors from the University of Chicago and received his PhD in physics from Cornell University.

== Career ==
Upon completing his PhD, Bloom became a postdoctoral researcher at Johns Hopkins University and the University of Michigan before accepting an assistant professor position at the University of Nebraska–Lincoln (UNL). In 2004, Bloom collaborated with Aaron Dominguez to enlist David Swanson in encouraging CERN to invest in upgrading the university's network. Their encouragement was successful and Bloom was subsequently chosen to lead all seven Compact Muon Solenoid particle detector sites spaced around the 17-mile-long Large Hadron Collider (LHC) supercollider ring, Tier2 sites in the United States. In this role, Bloom oversaw the Compact Muon Solenoid, one of the two largest experiments at the LHC. Two years later, Bloom worked alongside more than 2,000 other scientists and researchers on the Higgs boson which was the recipient of a Nobel Prize in Physics.

In 2015, Bloom was appointed the software and computing manager for the United States Compact Muon Solenoid operations program. He gained new responsibilities in his role including overseeing an annual budget of $18 million. His real-life blog Quantum Diaries was recognized on the television show The Big Bang Theory and served as a plot point for the episode. In the episode, he discusses the fictional study of main characters Sheldon Cooper and Leonard Hofstadter as an "admirable example of rare collaboration between a theorist and experimentalist" but warns them to disregard the rude comments. The following year, Bloom was elected a Fellow of the American Physical Society for his "contribution to characterizing the top quark, the heaviest known subatomic particle, from data gathered at the Tevatron collider and Large Hadron Collider." He was also promoted to the rank of full professor in Physics and Astronomy.

During the COVID-19 pandemic, Bloom was chosen to serve as a faculty associate to the chancellor for budget model implementation. In this new role, he was expected to advise on the development of the new incentive-based budget model and advise on effective planning, operations, and related governance. He was also named to the school's COVID-19 Budget Advisory Committee and executive committee.

== Personal life ==
Bloom married his wife Sarah Kelen on July 16, 2006, in a Jewish ceremony. Kelen is the dean of the College of Liberal Arts and Sciences at Nebraska Wesleyan University. He has two children, Eva and Moses.

Bloom appeared on the May 28, 2026 episode of Jeopardy!. He took third place with $10,200
