= James Kaplan =

American novelist

James C. Kaplan
- Born: September 10, 1951 (age 75); New York City, U.S.
- Occupation: Author

James C. Kaplan (born September 10, 1951) is an American novelist, journalist, and biographer.

== Biography ==
Kaplan was born in New York City and grew up in rural Pennsylvania and suburban New Jersey. He matriculated at New York University and graduated from Wesleyan University in 1973 with a degree in studio art. After graduation, Kaplan studied painting at the New York Studio School in Greenwich Village. He is the brother of editor Peter Kaplan.

In the mid-1970s, Kaplan worked as a typist at The New Yorker, where he came under the tutelage of the writer and editor William Maxwell. In the late 1970s and early 1980s, he published a number of short stories in The New Yorker. In the mid-1980s, Kaplan worked for several years as a screenwriter for Warner Brothers. Since the late 1980s, he has been a writer of magazine profiles for Vanity Fair, Entertainment Weekly, New York Magazine, The New York Times Magazine, Esquire, and The New Yorker, among others.

He is the author of the following books, among other works:

- 3 Shades of Blue: Miles Davis, John Coltrane, Bill Evans, and the Lost Empire of Cool (2024)
- Sinatra: The Chairman (2015)
- Frank: The Voice (2010) (selected by Michiko Kakutani of The New York Times as one of her Top 10 Books of 2010)
- Two Guys from Verona: A Novel of Suburbia (1999), a New York Times Notable Book of the Year
- The Airport: Terminal Nights and Runway Days at John F. Kennedy International (1994)
- Pearl's Progress (1989)

He is the co-author of the following biographies:

- With Jerry Lewis, a memoir of Lewis's relationship with Dean Martin, Dean & Me: (A Love Story) (2005)
- With John McEnroe, You Cannot Be Serious (2002)
- With Marina Abramovic, "Walk Through Walls: A Memoir" (2016)

Kaplan's fiction has been compared, by Francine Prose and David Gates, to that of John Updike, Vladimir Nabokov, and J.D. Salinger. His short fiction has appeared in The Best American Short Stories. He has appeared as a guest on The Charlie Rose Show. Kaplan is the 2011 Joan Jakobson Visiting Writer at Wesleyan University.

== Personal life ==
Kaplan lives in Hastings-on-Hudson, New York with his wife and son.
