= Garden State Equality v. Dow =

- Court: New Jersey Superior Court, Law Division, Mercer Vicinage
- Full case name: Garden State Equality et al. v. Paula Dow acting in her official capacity as Attorney General of New Jersey et al.
- Decided: September 27, 2013
- Citations: 82 A. 3d 336 - NJ: Superior Court, Law Div. 2013

Case history
- Subsequent actions: Defendants' motion to stay the trial court's order, denied (79 A. 3d 1036 - NJ: Supreme Court 2013)

Court membership
- Judges sitting: Mary C. Jacobson, A.J.S.C.

Keywords
- Same-sex marriage

Garden State Equality v. Dow, 82 A. 3d 336 (N.J. Super. Ct. Law Div. 2013) is a New Jersey Superior Court case holding that New Jersey's marriage laws violated the rights of same-sex couples to equal protection of the law under the New Jersey State Constitution. The ruling was issued on September 27, 2013. The Superior Court and the Superior Court, Appellate Division refused the State's request for a stay of the trial court's order, and the New Jersey Supreme Court refused to do so on a 7–0 vote. The ruling took effect on October 21, 2013. On the same day, New Jersey Governor Chris Christie dropped the State's plans to appeal, ending the denial of marriage rights to same-sex couples in New Jersey.

== Preliminary hearings ==
On June 29, 2011, Lambda Legal filed suit in the Law Division of the Superior Court for Mercer County (the county that includes the state capital of Trenton and therefore the offices of the Attorney General of New Jersey and the New Jersey Department of Law and Public Safety) on behalf of Garden State Equality, seven same-sex couples, and several of their children, arguing that New Jersey's civil unions did not provide the same rights as marriage as required by the court's decision in Lewis v. Harris (2006). The named defendant was Paula Dow, in her official capacity at the time as the Attorney General of New Jersey.

Superior Court Judge Linda Feinberg initially dismissed the plaintiffs' claim that their federal equal protection rights were violated when they were denied marriage licenses, but later reinstated it for consideration by the trial court. On July 3, 2013, the plaintiffs filed a motion for summary judgment, arguing that the U.S. Supreme Court's June 26 decision in United States v. Windsor meant that civil unions are not equivalent to marriage because same-sex couples in civil unions do not have access to the same federal benefits available to married couples. A hearing on the motion was held on August 15, 2013.

== Trial court ruling ==
On September 27, 2013, Mary C. Jacobson, Assignment Judge of the Mercer Vicinage of the Superior Court, ruled that the state must allow same-sex couples to marry. The effective date of her order was October 21.

In her ruling, Judge Jacobson wrote: "Since Windsor, the clear trend has been for Federal agencies to limit the extension of benefits to only those same-sex couples in legally recognized marriages." She pointed out that many of these agencies, including the Internal Revenue Service, Centers for Medicare and Medicaid Services, and Department of Labor, that are extending benefits to same-sex couples in a marriage, do not recognize New Jersey civil unions for benefits purposes. She pointed out that the proper issue before the court is whether the New Jersey civil union scheme is unconstitutional because "of the manner it is applied and incorporated by the Federal government." She reasoned that this disparate treatment of civil unions versus marriage raised an equal protection claim under both state and Federal constitutions if a state action led to this situation. Because New Jersey enacted a civil union statute that created a "parallel" structure to marriage and the N.J. Supreme Court deferred to the legislature on the actual name of the legal status granted to same-sex couples "as long as the classifications do not discriminate arbitrarily among persons similarly situated," Windsor changed the significance of the state's civil unions scheme. She determined that "the parallel legal structures created by the New Jersey Legislature no longer provided same sex couples with equal access to the rights and benefits enjoyed by married heterosexual couples, violating the mandate of Lewis and the New Jersey Constitution's equal protection guarantee."

== Appeal and application for stay ==
Governor Chris Christie immediately stated that his administration would appeal the ruling, and the Acting Attorney General requested any appeal to be fast-tracked or taken directly to the high court. On September 30, the state defendants files a notice of appeal with the Superior Court of New Jersey, Appellate Division. It said that on appeal the state would argue that Garden State Equality and the other plaintiffs had not established beyond a reasonable doubt that New Jersey's civil union law runs afoul of the Constitution; that the trial court did not exercise maximum caution in granting summary judgement in a far-reaching case in violation of precedent; that under Windsor, civil union spouses are indeed entitled to federal marriage benefits; and that the respondents' equal protection claims fail because the state has a rational basis for enforcing existing civil union law.

The state asked for a stay pending appeal, arguing that the state would suffer irreparable injury if same-sex marriage were allowed, that plaintiff's claim raises unsettled questions of Constitutional law, that the state has a reasonable probability of success in its appeal. On October 10, 2013, Judge Jacobson denied the state defendants' motion for a stay. She reasoned that the state's irreparable harm argument was "largely abstract...which pales in comparison to the concrete harm caused to the [p]laintiffs," who suffer from the denial of many federal benefits, and a massive litigation burden to challenge federal acceptance of New Jersey–specific civil unions in regards to these benefits.

Later that day, the state defendants applied to the Appellate Division for permission to file an emergency motion. The application noted that developments so far "permits same-sex couples to marry in less than 3 weeks," and that the issue has "far-reaching social implications, and alteration of the traditional definition of marriage would result in a profound change in the public consciousness of a social institution of ancient origin." Appellate Judge Carmen H. Alvarez granted permission for the state to file its motion on short notice, with the motion itself to be filed by the defendants the next day.

The state appealed the ruling and the state Supreme Court agreed to hear the appeal. The state also requested a stay of the ruling' implementation, which the state Supreme Court denied on October 18 in a 7–0 decision. Chief Justice Stuart Rabner wrote that "the state has advanced a number of arguments, but none of them overcome this reality: Same-sex couples who cannot marry are not treated equally under the law today." The ruling also denied the request for stay because the court could "find no public interest in depriving a group of New Jersey residents of their constitutional right to equal protection while the appeals process unfolds." Weddings were performed just after midnight on October 21, 2013, and Governor Christie dropped his administration's appeal of the lower court ruling that morning.

== See also ==
- LGBT rights in New Jersey
- Same-sex marriage in New Jersey
