= Freeheld (2007 film) =

- Directed by: Cynthia Wade
- Produced by: Vanessa Roth; Matthew Syrett; Cynthia Wade
- Starring: Laurel Hester; Stacie Andree
- Cinematography: Cynthia Wade
- Edited by: David Teague
- Music by: Rob Schwimmer
- Release date: 2007
- Running time: 40 minutes
- Country: United States
- Language: English

Freeheld is a 2007 documentary film directed by Cynthia Wade. It chronicles the story of Laurel Hester in her fight against the Ocean County, New Jersey Board of Chosen Freeholders to give her earned pension benefits to her partner, Stacie. On February 24, 2008, it won the Oscar for Best Documentary Short Subject. The documentary also won a Special Jury Prize at the Sundance Film Festival in 2007.

Freeheld has played in over 50 festivals worldwide and has earned 14 festival awards. The film had its US broadcast premiere in June 2008 on Cinemax. A film based on the documentary, starring Elliot Page and Julianne Moore, was released in October 2015.

== Synopsis ==
The film opens at a meeting of the Board of Chosen Freeholders of Ocean County, New Jersey. Ocean County resident and New Jersey police officer Lieutenant Laurel Hester has been diagnosed with terminal lung cancer, and expected to live only another year, she wishes to pass on her pension to her domestic partner of five years, Stacie Andree. Although New Jersey counties have the option to extend pension benefits to domestic partners, Ocean County Freeholders will not do this. In protest, the state's LGBT civil rights organization, Garden State Equality, organizes hundreds of people to speak out at each of the Freeholders' meetings. The crowds Garden State Equality organizes get bigger and more vociferous at each meeting.

Among those speaking out are Laurel's police colleagues and Ocean County residents, describing Laurel's 25 years of exemplary work for the police department, and petitioning the Freeholders to allow her to pass on her pension to Stacie. Laurel's first police partner, Dane Wells, speaks about her and compares the situation to separate drinking fountains and seats at the back of the bus. Freeholder Joseph Vicari says that although they are "anguished" by Laurel's case, they are unable to change things because of the state legislature and moves for an adjournment. The members of the public present are unhappy with this decision and some begin to chant "It's in your power".

Outside the administration building, news reporter Ida Siegal explains the background to the case. In 2004 New Jersey passed the Domestic Partnership Benefits and Obligations Act which allows all gay and lesbian state employees to pass on their benefits, including the pension, to their domestic partners. According to Siegal, all New Jersey counties can choose whether or not to allow their employees to pass on benefits to their partners. Ocean County Freeholders have decided against this.

Don Bennett, a reporter for the Ocean County Observer says that every time he talked to the Freeholders, they had a different excuse for not moving forward. Margaret Bonafide of the Asbury Park Press says that while Freeholder John Bartlett had said that such a benefit would have had to have been negotiated in union contract, Freeholder John Kelly had said that giving pension benefits to domestic partners would violate the sanctity of marriage.

Stacie says that the home she and Laurel have made together is more than just a house to them, and that she would like to keep it following Laurel's death. As an auto mechanic, Stacie does not earn much money and would be unlikely to be able to afford to keep the house without the pension. Laurel and Stacie are also struggling to pay doctors' bills for Laurel's treatment. Laurel says that if they were a heterosexual couple there would be no problem with Stacie receiving the pension. With not long to live, Laurel says that her only priority is spending time with Stacie and obtaining justice for her.

Dane Wells and former police chief Dick Chinery recall Laurel's work as a police officer, remembering her as an excellent marksman and a courageous officer. Wells describes her as the best partner he ever had. Describing himself as conservative, who votes for the Republican Party, Wells says that he had never paid particular attention to social issues or gay rights. Now he was working as hard as he could to help Laurel obtain justice before her death. When she first joined the police, Laurel's police chief and prosecutor knew that she was gay, but made it clear that she should keep that fact to herself. She was happy with that, wanting simply to focus on being the best detective she could be.

The day after the Freeholders' meeting, Laurel goes to hospital, and as a result of an MRI scan is told that the cancer has spread to her brain. Stacie spends time arranging payment plans for the medical bills, and praying for Laurel. As a result of chemotherapy, Laurel's hair begins to fall out. Stacie shaves Laurel's head for her and Laurel returns the favor, saying that Stacie now looks more like she did when the couple first met.

Six New Jersey counties make the decision to extend pension benefits to domestic partners. Don Bennett says that the Ocean County Freeholders are now under increasing pressure from the press and cannot come up with a good reason for their refusal to do likewise. Although the Freeholders attribute their decision to financial reasons, Dane Wells believes that one or two of the board oppose change, and that the other board members are backing them up. He says that John Kelly has said that his personal belief is that the change would violate the sanctity of marriage, but that this is not the official position of the Freeholders.

Laurel grows increasingly sick, losing all of her hair and finding it more difficult to breathe. She speaks of the difficulty of experiencing the physical changes of her illness and knowing that she will only ever get worse. When another Freeholder meeting is held, she is too sick too attend, so she videotapes a message instead. In the tape, she asks the Freeholders to sign the resolution and make a change "for good and righteousness". At the meeting the Freeholder's say that although Laurel has been a valuable employee, they will not allow her to pass on her pension. They say that although they have the money to do so, they will not pay pensions in the absence of a negotiated contract. John Kelly says that he has been misquoted in the press and that although it is a moral issue, he believes that Laurel is a moral person. When Dane Wells ask if they intend to change their minds before Laurel dies, the Freeholders decline to answer the question.

Laurel is visited at home by a hospice worker. She says that her symptoms have gotten worse, that they scare her and that she is very concerned with when she will die. When the hospice worker asks her what is most important, Laurel answers "Stacie".

Under mounting pressure, and following a telephone call from Governor Jon Corzine at the urging of Garden State Equality, the Freeholders call an emergency meeting. Stacie and Laurel, now in a wheelchair, attend the meeting. Freeholder Bartlett says that it is time to change the situation. The Freeholder of the county makes a motion to pass a resolution to expand pension benefits to county employees under the provisions of the law. The four Freeholders present agree. John Kelly does not attend the meeting. Laurel speaks briefly to news reporters and receives a standing ovation from the people present, including the Freeholders.

Laurel goes home to die and the final scene of the film shows her memorial service, attended by Stacie, Dane and her police colleagues. Nine months after her death, the New Jersey Supreme Court rules that same sex couples must have the same rights as heterosexual couples, forcing the state legislature to legalise civil unions in New Jersey.

== People featured ==
- Laurel Hester
- Stacie Andree, Hester's domestic partner
- Don Bennett, staff reporter for the Ocean County Observer
- Margaret Bonafide, staff reporter for the Asbury Park Press
- Dick Chinery, former New Jersey police chief
- Dane Wells, Hester's first police partner
- Steven Goldstein, Garden State Equality chair
- Coleen Markey Tosh, LCSW, Hospice Social Worker

The Freeholders of Ocean County declined to be interviewed for the film.

== Release and reception ==
Freeheld premiered at the 2007 Sundance Film Festival, where it won a Special Jury Prize. It was an official selection at many US and international film festivals, winning awards including the Boston Independent Festival Audience Award and the Audience Award at the Los Angeles Outfest LGBT Film Festival. A the 80th Academy Awards in 2008, Freeheld won the Academy Award for Best Documentary (Short Subject). It was released theatrically at selected cinemas across the United States in 2007 and had its US broadcast premiere on Cinemax in June 2008.

=== Awards and nominations ===
Year	Award	Organization	Category	Result
2007	Special Jury Prize	Sundance Film Festival	Short filmmaking	Won
2007	Special Jury Award	Seattle International Film Festival	Short Film Competition	Won
2007	Audience Award	Palm Springs International ShortFest	Best Documentary	Won
2007	Jury Award	Palm Springs International ShortFest	Best Documentary	Won
2007	Best Documentary Short	New York Lesbian and Gay Film Festival	Best Documentary	Won
2007	Audience Award	L.A. Outfest	Documentary - Short	Won
2007	IDA Award	International Documentary Association	Short Documentary	Nominated
2007	Audience Award	Boston Independent Film Festival	Short Film	Won
2008	Academy Award for Best Documentary (Short Subject)	Academy of Motion Picture Arts and Sciences	Best Documentary, Short Subjects	Won
2009	GLAAD Media Award	GLAAD Media Awards	Outstanding Documentary	Nominated

== Film adaptation ==
In May 2010, it was announced that Endgame Entertainment was developing a drama based on the documentary. It was released in 2015 with a script by Ron Nyswaner and directed by Peter Sollett. Julianne Moore and Elliot Page play Laurel and Stacie. Steve Carell plays Steven Goldstein.
