= LGBTQ rights in New Jersey =

- New Jersey (USA)
- Legal status: Legal since 1978
- Gender identity: Transgender people allowed to change legal gender
- Discrimination protections: Sexual orientation and gender identity protections (see below)

Family rights
- Recognition of relationships: Civil unions since 2007; Same-sex marriage since 2013
- Adoption: Same-sex couples may adopt jointly

Lesbian, gay, bisexual, transgender, and queer (LGBTQ) people in the U.S. state of New Jersey have the same legal rights as non-LGBTQ people. LGBT individuals in New Jersey enjoy strong protections from discrimination, and have had the same marriage rights as heterosexual people since October 21, 2013.

Since the late 1960s, state-sanctioned discrimination against LGBTQ people has become increasingly less acceptable. A series of court decisions have enlarged the areas of LGBT rights. LGBTQ people were allowed to gather in drinking establishments in 1967 and allowed to have intimate relationships in 1978. Anti-gay adoption policies by New Jersey's state welfare agency were dropped in 1997. The New Jersey Law Against Discrimination, amended to include sexual orientation and gender identity in 1991 and 2006, prohibits discrimination in employment, housing, and public accommodations. Criminal law deters bias-motivated crimes against LGBT individuals, and New Jersey schools are required to adopt anti-bullying measures that address LGBT students. In August 2013, Governor Chris Christie signed a bill into law prohibiting mental health providers from providing conversion therapy to LGBT minors.

New Jersey is frequently referred to as one of the United States' most LGBTQ-friendly states, with several gay establishments and venues throughout the state, notably in Jersey City, Asbury Park, Maplewood, Atlantic City, Ocean Grove, Edison, and Cape May among others. Opinion polls have shown very high levels of support for same-sex marriage.

== Legality of same-sex sexual activity ==
Sodomy was a capital crime in New Jersey from when the Duke of York took control of the province from the Dutch. When the province was divided into East and West Jersey, the Quaker-dominated West maintained a criminal code that was silent on the issue of sodomy. After reunification and independence, New Jersey abrogated the colonial common law, but created its own statuary sodomy law, the penalties for which were often modified.

Court decisions in New Jersey gradually restricted the application of sodomy laws to exclude first married couples, and then all heterosexual sexual relations. In the last court case in this series, State v. Ciuffini (1978), a state appellate court struck down the state's sodomy laws as unconstitutional, finding that "the individual's right of personal privacy and autonomy prevail[s] over the state's right to regulate private sexual conduct." New Jersey repealed its sodomy law in 1978.

=== Freedom of assembly ===
From its establishment in 1933, the New Jersey Division of Alcoholic Beverage Control regularly harassed LGBT bar patrons. It interpreted a regulation preventing licensees from serving "any known criminals, gangsters, racketeers, swindlers, prostitutes, female impersonators or other persons of ill repute" to revoke the liquor licenses of bars serving a predominantly homosexual customer base. In 1967, a state court invalidated this interpretation in One Eleven Liquors, Inc. vs. Division of Alcoholic Beverage Commission. In June 2021, the New Jersey Attorney General Gurbir Grewal made an official apology for the state's harassment of bar keepers and patrons.

== Recognition of same-sex relationships ==
Marriage, as the popular vehicle of state recognition of relationships, is mentioned in 850 of New Jersey's statutes. Marriage between persons of the same sex, however, are not mentioned in the statutes, which do not ban it either. The statutes were challenged in Lewis v. Harris (2006), where the Legislature chose civil unions over marriage in the resulting mandate for equal rights and responsibilities of marriage for same-sex couples. Same-sex couples legally married in another state or country may be divorced in New Jersey, a Superior Court has ruled.

New Jersey has provided benefits to same-sex partners of state employees since 2004.

Following a court decision on September 27, the state, effective October 21, 2013, has recognized and performed same-sex marriages. Governor Chris Christie attempted to appeal this decision to the New Jersey Supreme Court but on October 19, 2013 the court turned down his appeal and the lower court's ruling stands.

=== 2021 Legislation ===
In December 2021, New Jersey passed and implemented legislation to legally codify and protect same-sex marriage - just in case if future federal conservative court rulings (as a possibility) make same-sex marriage illegal again. On January 10, 2022 the Governor of New Jersey Phil Murphy signed the bill into law and automatically went into effect immediately - to officially codify same-sex marriage within New Jersey.

== Adoption and parenting ==
New Jersey never had a policy of denying adoption of children based on sexual orientation, however, the New Jersey Division of Youth and Family Services had a policy of denying consent to joint adoption by unmarried couples. This was changed in 1997. The sexual orientation of parents is not necessarily considered a dispositive factor in considering the best interests of the child, be they prospective in adoption or current in child custody cases.

In January 2020, New Jersey with a signature from Governor Phil Murphy implemented new adoption and child welfare laws - that immediately streamlined and reduced burdensome red tape for LGBT singles and couples.

There are no legal restrictions on lesbians getting IVF access.

Since 2011, bills have been introduced and passed by the New Jersey Legislature with no "veto-proof margins" to legally allow commercial surrogacy several times, but were immediately vetoed by Governor of New Jersey Chris Christie. Then in May 2018, the New Jersey Legislature passed (Assembly voted 51-16 and Senate voted 25-10) a bill to legally allow commercial surrogacy with "veto-proof margins". Governor Phil Murphy on May 30, 2018 signed the bill into law and went into effect since January 1, 2019. Several U.S. jurisdictions have similar surrogacy contract laws.

== Discrimination protections ==
=== Law Against Discrimination ===
New Jersey's Law Against Discrimination was amended in 1991 to include "affectional or sexual orientation" and in 2006 to include "gender identity and expression" as prohibited categories of discrimination. The law prohibits discrimination in employment and public accommodations, which the New Jersey Supreme Court took to be as broad as including the Boy Scouts of America for its public dealings, which was reversed by the Supreme Court of the United States in Boy Scouts of America v. Dale. The New Jersey Law Against Discrimination also protects individuals from discrimination based upon a perceived sexual orientation. On July 27, 2015, the National Executive Board of the Boy Scouts of America, ratified a resolution that removes the national restriction on openly gay adult leaders and employees.

=== Hate crimes ===
Enhanced penalties are available for crimes committed in New Jersey with a bias based on the presumed sexual orientation and gender identity or expression of the victim, as well as sensitivity training sentencing options for judges. The FBI New Jersey division also reports gender X (alongside male and female) since June 2021, on criminal justice and investigation procedures - directly from the attorney general.

In March 2021, a bill (A-4833) passed by a vote of 71-0 in the lower house of New Jersey legally banning "bias and intimidation" crimes - based on sexual orientation and gender identity. The bill is yet to be voted on in the New Jersey Senate.

=== LGBTIQ+ Seniors Bill of Rights ===
In March 2021, Governor Phil Murphy signed a bill into law effective immediately - that implemented an "LGBTIQ+ Seniors Bill of Rights".

=== Police licensing and patients data law ===
In July 2022, a bill was signed into law by the Governor of New Jersey that would implement a police licensing system within New Jersey - that explicitly includes sexual orientation and gender identity anti-discrimination protections. Also since July 2022, New Jersey implemented another law passed by the New Jersey General Assembly and signed by the Governor of New Jersey - to protect sexual orientation and gender identity "data of patients records within state run hospitals" and further enhance privacy protections therein for related purposes.

== Conversion therapy ==
In June 2013, the New Jersey Legislature passed legislation making sexual orientation change efforts (conversion therapy) illegal when directed at minors. Governor Chris Christie signed the legislation on August 19. New Jersey was the second U.S. state to enact such legislation, after California.

Represented by the Liberty Counsel, practitioners of conversion therapy, including the National Association for Research and Therapy of Homosexuality and the American Association of Christian Counselors, challenged the law in federal court. They lost in District Court on November 8, 2013, and again on appeal to the Third Circuit Court of Appeals on September 11, 2014. They asked the U.S. Supreme Court to hear their appeal on December 3, which declined to do in May 2015. In another case heard in Hudson County, a judge ruled that those who promote the therapy by claiming to cure a disorder are committing fraud.

In 2019, anti-LGBT group Liberty Counsel made another attempt to challenge the constitutionality of New Jersey's ban on conversion therapy, in the case of King v. Murphy. On April 15, 2019, the Supreme Court of the United States declined to hear the challenge, thereby upholding New Jersey's ban on conversion therapy.

== Gender identity and expression ==
Since February 1, 2019, transgender persons may request an amended birth certificate with a corrected name and sex without undergoing surgery or any medical procedures.

On June 28, 2015, the New Jersey General Assembly passed (Senate by a vote of 30-6 and the House by a vote of 51-23) a bill to make it easier for people on the basis of gender identity and intersex status, access and/or change to their birth certificates without any surgery. Republican Governor of New Jersey Chris Christie as expected, vetoed the bill on August 10, 2015. This was the second time he had vetoed the same bill, that was passed two years prior. Three additional votes were required in the Assembly for a successful veto override to implement the legislation.

In May 2018, the New Jersey Legislature passed 3 transgender rights bills. The 3 bills set up and established a "Transgender Equality Task Force", repealed the legal requirement for sex reassignment surgery on birth certificates, created a third gender category on official documents (labelled as "X"), and included transgender and intersex people on death certificates. In June 2018, following passage in the Legislature, Governor Phil Murphy signed into law all 3 bills. The birth certificate law went into effect the first day of the seventh month after approval (i.e. February 1, 2019), whilst the death certificate law went into effect on July 4, 2018, and the "Transgender Equality Task Force" law went into force immediately.

=== Drivers licenses ===
Since February 2020, individuals no longer need a doctor's note to change a sex marker from M to F or from F to M for individual's driver licenses and I.D.s across New Jersey. Since April 2021, a regulation went into effect regarding three sex markers of X, M and F availability for individual's driver licenses and I.D.s across New Jersey.

=== Executive order on name changes ===
In November 2022, the Governor of New Jersey signed an executive order to allow transgender individuals privacy, dignity and confidentiality when formally changing a legal name on forms and documents.

=== Executive order on gender-affirming healthcare ===
In April 2023, the Governor of New Jersey signed an executive order legally protecting and defending gender-affirming healthcare within New Jersey borders - for any transgender individuals who want or need access and services (including interstate).

=== Sports ===
The New Jersey State Interscholastic Athletic Association maintains athlete participation in accordance with their gender identity.

== LGBTQ friendly business policy development ==
In 2024, New Jersey passed laws that codified a 2021 executive order - to implement "LGBTQ friendly business policy development". Canada, California and New York State have similar schemes on LGBTQ business policy development.

== Educational inclusion ==
Sex education (or "family life education") is mandatory in all New Jersey public schools. Under state law, the lessons must be current, medically accurate and supported by extensive research. They should also be developmentally appropriate, gender- and culturally-sensitive, and bias-free. The class covers a range of topic, including human relationships and sexuality, the prevention of unhealthy sexual behaviors that might lead to sexually transmitted diseases, consent, abstinence, and the demands of pregnancy and parenting. Discussions on sexual orientation are required from the end of eighth grade (age 13-14), and include tolerance and sensitivity, harassment, name-calling and stereotyping. In fourth grade (age 9-10), students are taught that "there are different kinds of families; family members have different roles and responsibilities; and families share love, values, and traditions, provide emotional support for each other, and set boundaries and limits". Parents may choose to have their child(ren) opt out if the class is "in conflict with his or her conscience or sincerely held moral or religious beliefs".

Anti-LGBT bullying is also prohibited in New Jersey schools, and all schools are required to post and distribute their anti-bullying policies. The Pride Center of New Jersey opened its doors in 1994 support the social needs of the LGBT community and youth across the state.

In September 2018, New Jersey issued guidance to schools to promote transgender-friendly policies on the use of names and pronouns, participation in activities, use of facilities and student records.

In January 2019, Governor Murphy signed into law a bill requiring public schools in the state to teach about "the political, economic and social contributions of individuals who are [LGBTQ]". As of the 2020–2021 school year, schools must teach LGBT history. The law compels the inclusion of the contributions of persons with disabilities and lesbian, gay, bisexual, and transgender people into educational textbooks and the social studies curricula in the state. It also amended existing education and bullying laws by adding "sexual orientation, gender identity or expression, disability and religion" - alongside race, ethnicity, nationality, gender, and color that schools are prohibited from sponsoring negative activities about or teaching students about in an adverse way.

In December 2020, the New Jersey Legislature passed another mandatory diversity within all New Jersey schools bill. The bill was signed into law on March 1, 2021.

=== School districts outing students ===
In June 2023, several school districts within New Jersey passed policies and motions that out students (who are transgender and non-binary) to their parents. This "potentially violates" New Jersey discrimination and hate crime legislation. School boards in Middletown, Marlboro, and Manalapan-Englishtown within New Jersey, all have adopted immediate "parent notification policies" so far. The New Jersey Attorney's General office is commencing a lawsuit - to block these policies.

== Gay panic defense ==
In January 2020, the New Jersey Legislature unanimously passed during a lame-duck session bill A1796 (by a vote of 73-0 in the lower house and 39-0 in the upper house), banning or substantially limiting the so called "gay panic defense". The bill stated: “a provocation is not objectively reasonable if it is based on the discovery of, knowledge about, or potential disclosure of the homicide victim’s actual or perceived gender identity or expression, or affectional or sexual orientation, including under circumstances in which the victim made an unwanted, non-forcible romantic or sexual advance toward the actor, or if the victim and actor dated or had a romantic or sexual relationship.” The New Jersey Bill A1796 was signed into law in January 2020. The law went into effect immediately.

== LGBTIQ+ veterans in New Jersey ==
In March 2021, the New Jersey Legislature passed (House vote 68-1 and Senate vote 33-0) a bill to provide legal benefits to "dishonorably discharged" LGBTIQ+ veterans within the US Military prior to 2011. Governor Murphy signed the bill into law in April 2021.

== Laws regarding HIV transmission ==
New Jersey state law makes it a third degree criminal offense for a person knowingly infected with HIV to engage in sexual activity without informing their partner of their status. However, people infected with other sexually transmitted infections are subject to lesser (fourth degree) criminal penalties for the same behavior. In January 2022, both houses of the New Jersey Legislature passed bill S3707 to remove this exception for HIV and to reduce the penalty for engaging in sex while infected with any STI (including HIV) to a disorderly persons offense. Governor Murphy signed the bill into law on January 18, 2022. Introduced in 2024, the bill A3089 seeks to allow the dispensing of HIV prophylaxis without individual prescription under certain circumstances and mandate prescription benefits coverage, to better support access to HIV medication.

== Public opinion ==
A 2017 Public Religion Research Institute poll found that 68% of New Jersey residents supported same-sex marriage, while 23% were opposed and 9% were unsure. Additionally, 70% supported discrimination protections covering sexual orientation and gender identity. 21% were opposed.

A 2022 Public Religion Research Institute (PRRI) poll found that 76% of New Jersey residents supported same-sex marriage, while 21% were opposed and 3% were unsure. Additionally, 86% supported discrimination protections covering sexual orientation and gender identity. 11% were opposed.

== Summary table ==
Same-sex sexual activity legal	Yes (Since 1978)
Equal age of consent (16)	Yes
Anti-discrimination laws for sexual orientation	Yes (Since 1991)
Anti-discrimination laws for gender identity and expression	Yes (Since 2006)
LGBT anti-bullying law in schools and colleges	Yes
Same-sex marriage	Yes (Since 2013 by court order; codified by the legislature and Governor in 2022)
Recognition of same-sex couples (e.g. civil union)	Yes
Stepchild adoption by same-sex couples	Yes
Joint adoption by same-sex couples	Yes
Lesbians, gays and bisexuals allowed to serve openly in the military	Yes (Since 2011)
Transgender people allowed to serve openly in the military	No (Since 2025)
Transvestites allowed to serve openly in the military	No
Intersex people allowed to serve openly in the military	/ Yes (Current DoD policy bans "Hermaphrodites" from serving or enlisting in the military)
Third gender option	Yes (Since 2021)
Right to change legal gender without sex reassignment surgery	Yes (Since 2019)
Gay and trans panic defense banned	Yes (Since 2020)
Conversion therapy banned on minors	Yes (Since 2013)
LGBTIQ+ Seniors Bill of Rights implemented	Yes (Since 2021)
Access to IVF for lesbians	Yes
LGBT-inclusive sex education required to be taught in all New Jersey schools	Yes (Since 2021)
Surrogacy arrangements legal for all individuals and couples	Yes (Since 2019)
MSMs allowed to donate blood	Yes / No (3 month deferral period - federal policy)

== See also ==
- Boy Scouts of America v. Dale
- Freeheld (2007 film)
- Freeheld (2015 film)
- Politics of New Jersey
- Law of New Jersey
- Rights and responsibilities of marriages in the United States
- LGBT rights in the United States
