= Steven Goldstein (activist) =

American rabbi

- Rabbi Steven Goldstein, 2026
- Born: June 11, 1962
- Education: Brandeis University (BA); Harvard Kennedy School (MPP); Columbia University Graduate School of Journalism (MS); Columbia Law School (JD; Academy for Jewish Religion (MA)
- Political party: Democratic (before 2025); Independent (2025–present)

Steven Goldstein (born June 11, 1962) is an American rabbi, civil rights activist, lawyer and author. He is the rabbi of The Reform Temple of Rockland in Upper Nyack, New York.

== Civil rights activist ==
Goldstein founded Garden State Equality, New Jersey's statewide organization for LGBTQ equality, in 2004, and led the organization during campaigns for marriage equality and other LGBTQ civil rights measures in New Jersey.

At Garden State Equality, Goldstein organized the campaign on behalf of Laurel Hester, a terminally ill Ocean County police lieutenant who sought to leave her pension benefits to her domestic partner, Stacie Andree, before the legalization of marriage equality. The campaign was chronicled in the documentary Freeheld, which won the Academy Award for Best Documentary Short Subject. The story was adapted as the 2015 feature film Freeheld, with Steve Carell portraying Goldstein.

Goldstein left Garden State Equality in 2013 to become an associate chancellor at Rutgers University–Newark. The Star-Ledger described him at the time as New Jersey's “most visible gay rights activist.”

== Jewish and rabbinical career ==
Goldstein pursued rabbinical studies at the Academy for Jewish Religion, receiving a Master of Arts in Jewish Studies in 2023 and rabbinic ordination in 2026. While at AJR, Goldstein received an AIPAC Leffell Fellowship.

He studied for a year at the Reconstructionist Rabbinical College. In 2024, Goldstein and fellow student Talia Werber publicly criticized what they described as hostility toward Zionist students. Goldstein moved into Jewish education and communal leadership, serving as education director at Old York Road Temple–Beth Am and later as director of the Jewish Community Relations Council of Greater New Haven. After returning to the Academy for Jewish Religion to complete his rabbinical studies, he became rabbi of The Reform Temple of Rockland in 2026.

== Media, politics and academia ==
Goldstein worked as a television producer early in his career. He won ten regional Emmy Awards as a news producer in Washington, D.C., and was a producer on The Oprah Winfrey Show.

He later served as counsel to the U.S. House Judiciary Committee's Subcommittee on Crime and as communications director for U.S. Senator Frank Lautenberg. He subsequently worked in Democratic politics, including as co-campaign manager of Jon Corzine's 2000 U.S. Senate campaign.

While at Rutgers, Goldstein also taught at Rutgers Law School He later taught business communication at the Wharton School of the University of Pennsylvania.

From 2016 to 2017, he served as executive director of the Anne Frank Center for Mutual Respect.

== Publications ==
In 2019, Harper Business published Goldstein's The Turn-On: How the Powerful Make Us Like Them — From Washington to Wall Street to Hollywood, an examination of the likeability traits of public figures that shape how the public perceives them.

Goldstein is also a blogger for The Times of Israel, where he writes in support of Israel and Zionism. In a 2025 essay, he announced that he had changed his voter registration from Democratic to Independent, attributing the decision to what he regarded as increasing anti-Zionism within the Democratic Party. He described himself in the essay as a “mainstream centrist liberal.”

== Education ==
Before his rabbinical studies, Goldstein received a B.A. summa cum laude from Brandeis University, an M.P.P. from the Harvard Kennedy School, an M.S. from the Columbia University Graduate School of Journalism, and a J.D. from Columbia Law School.
