= Nyumba ntobhu =

Tradition of Tanzania

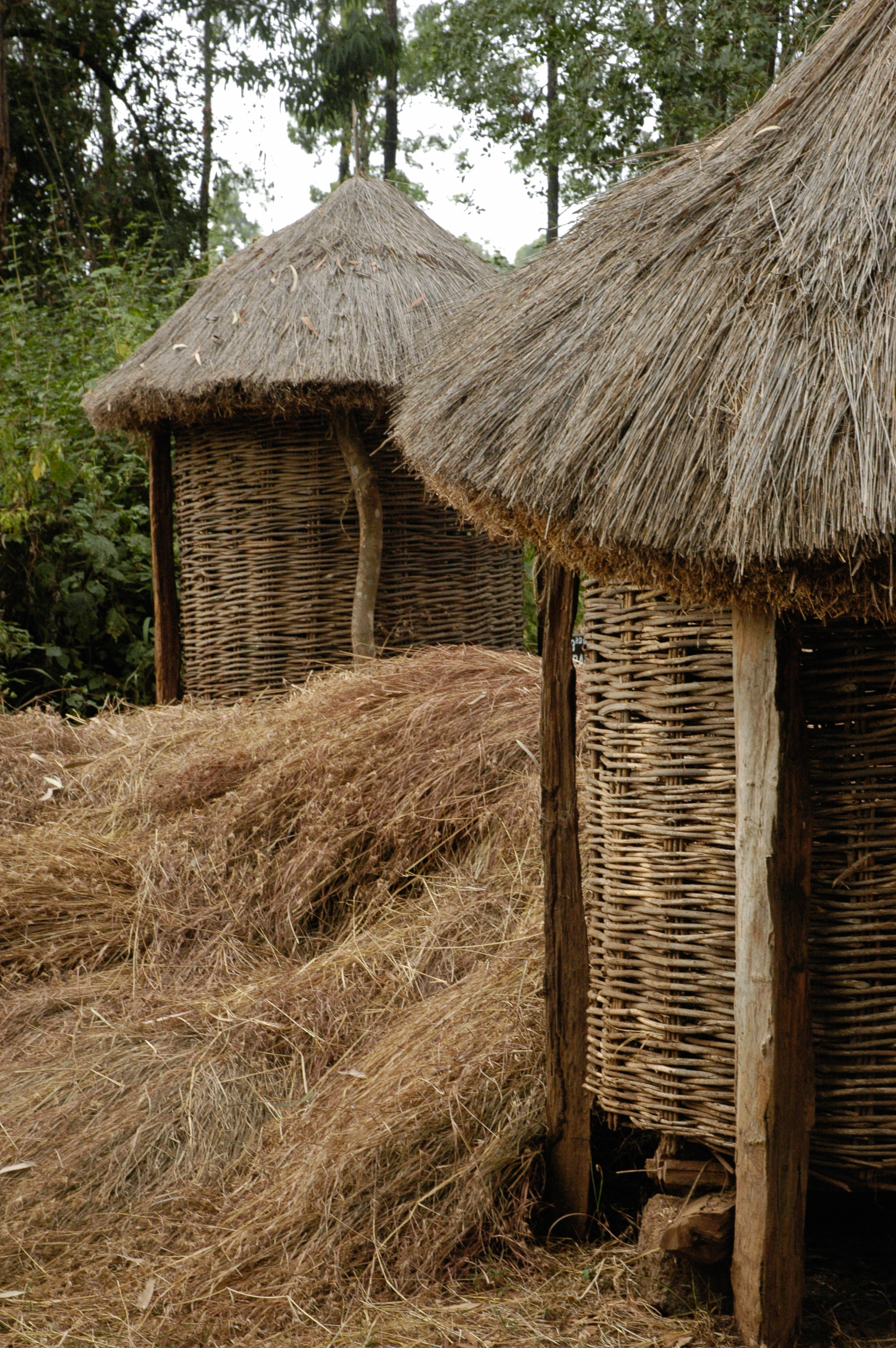
Traditional Kuria village

Nyumba ntobhu (meaning "house without a man") is a traditional form of non-sexual same-sex union among Kuria women of the Mara Region of Tanzania and Migori County of Kenya; the partnerships are formed between older, usually widowed women without male descendants and younger, childless women, known as mokamööna (daughters-in-law). As part of the relationship, the younger mokamööna bears a child from an external male partner. The elder woman serves as a grandmother to the resulting child, thus securing her with an heir and ensuring the continuation of her lineage. Nyumba ntobhu marriages, like traditional Kuira marriages, are secured through the payment of a bride price in the form of cattle; in the case of nyumba ntobhu relationships, the bride price is provided by the older woman to the family of the younger partner. There are no sexual relations between the two women.

Among the Kuria, nyumba ntobhu couples make up an estimated 10 to 15 percent of households.

Nyumba ntobhu relationships have become increasingly common within recent years. Many younger Kuria women enter the relationships as a means of gaining increased agency in choosing their sexual partners and avoiding domestic abuse and female genital mutilation.
