= Laurel Hester =

American activist and police officer

- Born: Laurel Anne Hester; August 15, 1956; Elgin, Illinois U.S.
- Died: February 18, 2006 (aged 49); Point Pleasant, New Jersey, U.S.
- Occupations: Police officer, activist
- Spouse: Stacie Andree

Laurel Anne Hester (August 15, 1956 – February 18, 2006) was a police lieutenant with the Ocean County, New Jersey Prosecutor's Office, who came to national attention with her deathbed appeal for the extension of pension benefits to her domestic partner. Her battle was shown in Freeheld (2007), the winner of the Academy Award for Best Short Documentary, and the feature film of the same name (2015), in which Hester is portrayed by Julianne Moore.

== Early life ==
Laurel Anne Hester was born in Elgin, Illinois, and grew up in Florham Park, the daughter of Diana (1922–1995) and George Hester (1919–1992). She has two brothers, former Wall Street executive George II (1950–2022) and retired Senior Foreign Service Officer James, and a sister, real-estate agent Lynda (Hester) D'Orio. Hester realized she was gay at a young age. Though she accepted herself, at times her sexual orientation made her feel isolated. As a child, her family often summered at the Jersey Shore, and later Hester would return to work in the area.

== Education ==
After graduating in 1974 from Hanover Park High School in East Hanover Township, New Jersey, Hester earned a bachelor's degree in criminal justice and psychology from Stockton State College, now Stockton University. While in school, she was a charter member and co-coordinator of the student club, Gay People's Union, the first LGBT group on Stockton's campus. Along with Kevin M. Cathcart, Hester served as co-president, but used a pseudonym so no one outside of the group would know she was gay. Her role in this student group was made public in November 1975, in a letter to the editor of The Argo entitled, Gay's rebuttal, which later resulted in her loss of a police department internship. She would continue to write articles advocating LGBT rights for The Argo until her graduation in 1977.

== Career ==
Her first position in law enforcement was in North Wildwood, New Jersey. After two summers working as a seasonal officer, she was told she would not be hired for a third because she was gay. She was then hired in Ocean County, New Jersey as a police officer. Hester spent 23 years there, becoming a detective in the Ocean County prosecutor's office, where she worked on a variety of cases. She was one of the first women to achieve the rank of lieutenant in her department and was greatly respected by her fellow officers.

== Relationship ==
In 1999, Hester met Stacie Andree at a volleyball game in Philadelphia. Hester was 19 years older than Andree, and the two women soon fell in love. They ended up buying a house together in Point Pleasant, New Jersey, and registered their domestic partnership on October 28, 2004. At the time, same-sex marriage was not legal in the United States.

== Illness and death ==
Hester was a Detective in the Ocean County prosecutor's office when she was diagnosed with rapidly spreading lung cancer. She died on February 18, 2006, aged 49, in the home she shared with her partner, Stacie Andree.

== Freeheld ==
Laurel Hester's cancer metastasized, spread to her brain, and it became clear that she had little time to live. Hester lived with and jointly owned a house with her registered domestic partner, Stacie Andree, who would not be able to afford mortgage payments upon Hester's death. A married heterosexual with Hester's years of police service would be able to pass on pension benefits to a spouse, but this privilege was not afforded to same-sex domestic partners in Ocean County.

Hester appealed to local authorities to change this policy, and was supported by the local Policemen's Benefit Association. Instead, in a private meeting on November 9, 2005, the five Republican members of the county board of chosen freeholders voted against the proposal, with freeholder John P. Kelly arguing that it threatened "the sanctity of marriage". On November 23, a rally of between 100 and 200 supporters gathered to protest the county's inaction.

On January 18, 2006, an impassioned videotaped appeal by a weakening Hester from her hospital bed was shown at a meeting of the freeholders, who then met with county Republican leaders in a teleconference on January 20. The next day, the freeholders announced that they were reversing their stance, and would meet on January 25 to extend pension benefits to registered domestic partners, three weeks before Hester's death.

== Tributes ==
Hester's battle for pension benefits was shown in Freeheld (2007), the winner of the Academy Award for Best Documentary (Short Subject) and the feature film Freeheld (2015), in which Hester is portrayed by Julianne Moore.

The LEAGUE Foundation, which provides financial resources for American LGBT high school seniors entering their first year of institutions of higher learning, has awarded the Laurel Hester Memorial Scholarship annually since 2006.

The Gay Officers Action League (GOAL) of New York awards the Laurel Hester Award.

In February 2016, Stockton University's Board of Trustees presented the original GPU charter (of which Hester co-founded) to its renamed student club, Pride Alliance. This framed historical document now hangs in the Women's, Gender & Sexuality Center at Stockton University for all to visit.
