= Freeheld =

- Theatrical release poster
- Directed by: Peter Sollett
- Screenplay by: Ron Nyswaner
- Based on: Freeheld by Cynthia Wade
- Produced by: Elliot Page (Note: Credited as Ellen Page; the film was released before Page came out as transgender.); Michael Shamberg; Stacey Sher; James D. Stern; Cynthia Wade
- Starring: Julianne Moore; Elliot Page; Michael Shannon; Steve Carell
- Cinematography: Maryse Alberti
- Edited by: Andrew Mondshein
- Music by: Hans Zimmer; Johnny Marr
- Production companies: Bankside Films; Endgame Entertainment; Head Gear Films; High Frequency Entertainment; Double Feature Films
- Distributed by: Summit Entertainment (through Lionsgate)
- Release dates: September 13, 2015 (TIFF); October 2, 2015 (United States)
- Running time: 103 minutes
- Country: United States
- Language: English
- Budget: $7 million
- Box office: $1.7 million

Freeheld is a 2015 American drama film directed by Peter Sollett from a screenplay by Ron Nyswaner. The film stars Julianne Moore, Elliot Page, Michael Shannon, and Steve Carell. It is based on the 2007 documentary short film of the same name about police officer Laurel Hester's fight against the Ocean County, New Jersey Board of Chosen Freeholders to allow her pension benefits to be transferred to her domestic partner after being diagnosed with terminal cancer.

== Plot ==
The film is based on the true story of Laurel Hester, a police officer in Ocean County, New Jersey. The story narrates the difficulties faced by a lesbian police detective and her domestic partner, Stacie Andree. Following her diagnosis with terminal lung cancer in 2005, Hester repeatedly appealed to the county's board of chosen freeholders to have her pension benefits passed on to her domestic partner; she was eventually successful.

== Cast ==
- Julianne Moore as Laurel Hester, a New Jersey police detective who is diagnosed with terminal cancer
- Elliot Page as Stacie Andree, a car mechanic and Hester's domestic partner
- Michael Shannon as Dane Wells, Hester's supportive police partner
- Steve Carell as Steven Goldstein, founder and then-Chair of Garden State Equality
- Luke Grimes as Todd Belkin, Hester's closeted gay colleague
- Josh Charles as Bryan Kelder, a member of the Ocean County board of chosen freeholders and a lawyer
- Mary Birdsong as Carol Andree, Stacie's mother
- Kelly Deadmon as Lynda Hester D'Orio, Laurel's sister
- Gabriel Luna as Quesada
- Anthony DeSando as Toohey
- Skipp Sudduth as Chief Reynolds
- William Sadler as Peter Santucci
- Dennis Boutsikaris as Pat Gerrity
- Adam LeFevre as Don Bennett
- Traci Hovel as Hannah

== Production ==
=== Development ===
Screenwriter Ron Nyswaner announced his intention in 2010 to write a feature-length adaptation of Cynthia Wade's 2007 Oscar-winning short film Freeheld, a documentary about New Jersey police officer Laurel Hester's fight against the Ocean County, New Jersey Board of Chosen Freeholders to pass on her pension benefits to her domestic partner, Stacie Andree, after being diagnosed with terminal cancer. At that time, Elliot Page had already agreed to star as Andree; he stated in 2014 that he had been involved in the project's development for almost six years. He first became involved after two of the film's producers, Stacey Sher and Michael Shamberg, sent him a copy of Wade's documentary and asked if he was interested in starring in an adaptation, an offer which he accepted "right away". Catherine Hardwicke was attached to the project as director early in its development but later withdrew. Shortly after the film's financing was secured in August 2012, Peter Sollett signed on to replace Hardwicke as director. Julianne Moore was cast as Hester in February 2014. Zach Galifianakis was cast as Steven Goldstein, the founder and then-Chair of Garden State Equality, but was later replaced by Steve Carell. Andree consulted with Page, Sollett and Nyswaner about the making of the film.

=== Filming ===
Although the film is set in New Jersey, it was filmed in New York due to its more generous tax incentives for filmmakers. Filming began in October 2014 in Queens. In late October, a scene that was supposed to be filmed at Salesian High School, a Catholic boys' school in New Rochelle, New York, had to be relocated after the school's principal reversed his decision to allow the crew to film on the school campus. The shoot was later relocated to the city hall of Rye, New York, which stood in for the Ocean County Administration Building in a scene where Hester and Andree apply for domestic partnership. Another scene, in which Hester lies ill in a hospital room, was filmed in the community center of Greenburgh, New York, while the town board room of North Hempstead, New York stood in for the Ocean County Board of Freeholders' chambers.

=== Soundtrack ===
The soundtrack was composed by Hans Zimmer & Johnny Marr. It was released at WaterTower Music & iTunes and includes the following tracks.

1. "On The Case"
2. "Can I Have Your Number?"
3. "House Hunting"
4. "Can't Leave Her"
5. "The Decision"
6. "Justice"
7. "Remembering"

== Release ==
In February 2015, Lionsgate acquired distribution rights to the film. It received a limited release on October 2, 2015.

== Reception ==
Freeheld received mixed reviews from critics. Review aggregator website Rotten Tomatoes reports a 49% rating based on 136 reviews, with an average rating of 5.62/10. The consensus states: "Freeheld certainly means well, but its cardboard characters and by-the-numbers drama undermine its noble intentions." On Metacritic, the film has a 50 out of 100 rating based on 30 critics, indicating "mixed or average" reviews.

== See also ==
- List of LGBT-related films of 2015
