= Lewis v. Harris =

New Jersey ruling re same-sex marriage

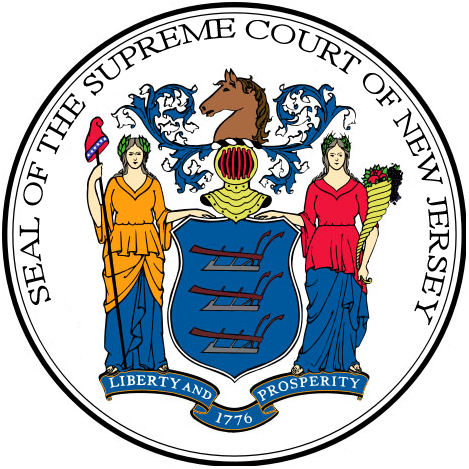
- Court: Supreme Court of New Jersey
- Full case name: Mark Lewis and Dennis Winslow; Saundra Heath and Clarita Alicia Toby; Craig Hutchison and Chris Lodewyks; Maureen Kilian and Cindy Meneghin; Sarah and Suyin Lael; Marilyn Maneely and Diane Marini; and Karen and Marcye Nicholson–McFadden, Plaintiffs–Appellants, v. Gwendolyn Harris, in her official capacity as Commissioner of the New Jersey Department of Human Services; Clifton R. Lacy, in his official capacity as the Commissioner of the New Jersey Department of Health and Senior Services; and Joseph Komosinski, in his official capacity as Acting State Registrar of Vital Statistics of the New Jersey State Department of Health and Senior Services, Defendants–Respondents.
- Argued: February 15, 2006
- Decided: October 25, 2006
- Citations: 188 N.J. 415; 908 A.2d 196 (2006)

Case history
- Prior actions: State's motion for summary judgement granted, Lewis v. Harris, 2003 WL 23191114 (N.J. Super. Ct. Law Div. 2003); affirmed, 378 N.J.Super. 168, 875 A.2d 259 (2005).
- Subsequent actions: Motion to enforce litigant's rights, dismissed without prejudice, 202 N.J. 340 (2010)

Holding
- 1. Same-sex marriage is not a fundamental right under the Fourteenth Amendment or the New Jersey Constitution.; 2. The equal protection guarantee of the New Jersey Constitution requires same-sex couples to be afforded the same rights and benefits as married opposite-sex couples.

Court membership
- Chief judge: Deborah T. Poritz
- Associate judges: Virginia Long, Jaynee LaVecchia, James R. Zazzali, Barry T. Albin, John E. Wallace, Jr., Roberto A. Rivera-Soto

Case opinions
- Majority: Albin, joined by LaVecchia, Wallace, Rivera-Soto
- Concur/dissent: Poritz, joined by Long, Zazzali

Laws applied
- U.S. Const. amend. XIV, N.J. Const. art. I, ¶ 1
- Superseded by
- Obergefell v. Hodges (2015) (in part)

Lewis v. Harris, 188 N.J. 415; 908 A.2d 196 (N.J. 2006), is a New Jersey Supreme Court case that held that the state's marriage laws violated the rights of same-sex couples to equal protection of the law under the state constitution. Four of the seven justices ruled that the legislature must, within six months, either amend marriage laws or create civil unions. In response, the legislature created the status of civil unions for same-sex couples.

== Lawsuit ==
Seven same-sex couples, ten women and four men, filed suit in state Superior Court in June 2002 claiming that denying them access to marriage violated the liberty and equal protection guarantees of the New Jersey Constitution. Each couple had been denied a marriage license. They were represented by Lambda Legal. They named as defendants Gwendolyn L. Harris, the Commissioner of the New Jersey Department of Human Services, and other state officials. The plaintiffs lost in Superior Court and again in the Appellate Division.

The New Jersey Supreme Court heard oral arguments on February 15, 2006.

== Decision ==
The court's seven justices ruled on October 25, 2006, that same-sex couples are entitled to the same equal protection as heterosexual couples under the New Jersey State Constitution. The court unanimously held that current state law is unconstitutional with respect to the equal protection of same sex couples, but divided as to the appropriate remedy. Four justices ruled that the legislature must either amend marriage laws or create civil unions within six months. The three justices in the minority argued that the legislature should be required to amend the state's marriage law to include same-sex couples.

=== Majority Opinion ===
Associate Justice Barry T. Albin authored the majority opinion. Chief Justice Deborah T. Poritz wrote the dissent, issuing it in her final day as a member of the court. Associate Justice James R. Zazzali, who was sworn in as Chief Justice the following day, joined in her dissent. There were both Democrats and Republicans in the majority and the minority. All four in the majority were appointed by Democratic governors, all those in the minority by Republicans. Justice Albin asked "What's in a name?" as he considered the appropriate remedy. Deciding to allow the legislature to determine what name to give to legal same-sex relationships, he wrote: "If the age-old definition of marriage is to be discarded, such change must come from the crucible of the democratic process." He noted that "same-sex couples will be free to call their relationship by the name they choose."

=== Concurrence/Dissent ===
Chief Justice Deborah Poritz authored an opinion joined by Justices Virginia Long and James R. Zazzali. She concurred with the majority's holding that the State's Constitution's due process clause required same-sex couples to have the same benefits as heterosexual marriages. But she dissented from the majority allowing the state to only enact civil unions rather than marriage rights. Poritz wrote: "We must not underestimate the power of language". Assessing the conflict over the name given to same-sex relationships, one legal scholar thought that the court's majority had found a politically acceptable compromise: "This makes sense as statesmanship. The word 'marriage' seems to push people's buttons in a major way."

== Legislative response ==
The New Jersey legislature opted not to legalize same-sex marriage, but instead passed a bill establishing civil unions. Governor Jon Corzine signed the Civil Union Act on December 21, 2006, and it took effect on February 19, 2007. A year later, as required by the Civil Union Act, the legislature created a commission to examine how the law was working and to consider alternatives. The commission unanimously recommended that the legislature legalize same-sex marriage. New Jersey Governor Jon Corzine said he would sign such legislation, but wanted to wait until after the 2008 presidential election. The New Jersey Senate Judiciary committee approved the Freedom of Religion and Equality in Civil Marriage Act by a 7-6 vote. The full Senate defeated it 20-14 on January 7, 2010. Republican Governor-elect Chris Christie said that he would not sign a marriage equality bill.

== Later litigation ==
After the Senate vote against same-sex marriage, Garden State Equality, in partnership with Lambda Legal, announced that it would ask the New Jersey Supreme Court to recognize the legislature's failure to comply with Lewis v. Harris. The court dismissed that motion.

After the U.S. Supreme Court ruling in United States v. Windsor in June 2013, the Lewis plaintiffs joined in a new lawsuit, Garden State Equality v. Dow, seeking a ruling that the status of civil unions failed to establish equal rights for same-sex couples. Their suit was successful. The trial court ruled that the fact that the federal government did not recognize New Jersey's civil unions as the equivalent of marriage established that same-sex couples in civil unions continued to be denied equal protection.

== See also ==
- LGBT rights in New Jersey
- Same-sex marriage in the United States
- Recognition of same-sex unions in New Jersey
