= Convention on the Recognition of Registered Partnerships =

Convention on the recognition of registered partnerships
- Signed: 5 September 2007
- Location: Munich, Germany
- Effective: Not effective
- Condition: 2 ratifications
- Signatories: Portugal; Spain
- Ratifiers: Spain
- Depositary: Swiss Federal Council
- Language: French

The Convention on the recognition of registered partnerships (French: Convention sur la reconnaissance des partenariats enregistrés) is a multilateral convention, drafted by the International Commission on Civil Status which provides the acceptance in other countries of any form of registered partnership, which is not a marriage Parties to the convention should recognize the partnership, as well as the consequences regarding name change not only towards other state parties, but with regards to partnerships in any state. The partnership can be between partners of the same or of opposite sex.

== Reservations ==
State parties can make reservations regarding

- applicability to persons of the opposite sex
- acceptance of partnerships of any state (rather than states parties to the treaty)
- the consequences regarding name changes

== Member states and signatories ==
The convention has been ratified only by Spain and has been signed only by Spain and Portugal. Having not been ratified by two states, it therefore has not entered into force.

Country	Date of signature	Date of ratification	Comment
Portugal	1 October 2008		
Spain	23 July 2009	4 August 2010	

== See also ==
- International Commission on Civil Status
