= Civil union =

Legal union similar to marriage

A civil union, also known by a variety of other terms, is a legal recognition of a relationship. Civil unions grant some or all of the rights of marriage, with child adoption being a common exception. Many jurisdictions with civil unions recognize foreign unions if those are essentially equivalent to their own; for example, the United Kingdom lists equivalent unions in the Civil Partnership Act 2004 Schedule 20. The marriages of same-sex couples performed abroad may be recognized as civil unions in jurisdictions that only have the latter.

Civil unions have been established by law in several mostly developed countries in order to provide legal recognition of relationships formed by same-sex couples and to afford them rights, benefits, tax breaks, and responsibilities. In 1989, Denmark was the first country to legalise civil unions; however, most other developed democracies did not begin establishing them until the 1990s and early 2000s. In Brazil, civil unions were first created for opposite-sex couples in 2002, and then expanded to include same-sex couples in 2011. In the majority of countries that established same-sex civil unions, they have since been either supplemented or replaced by same-sex marriage. Civil unions are viewed by LGBT rights campaigners as a "first step" towards establishing same-sex marriage, as civil unions are viewed by supporters of LGBT rights as a "separate but equal" status.

== Overview and terminology ==
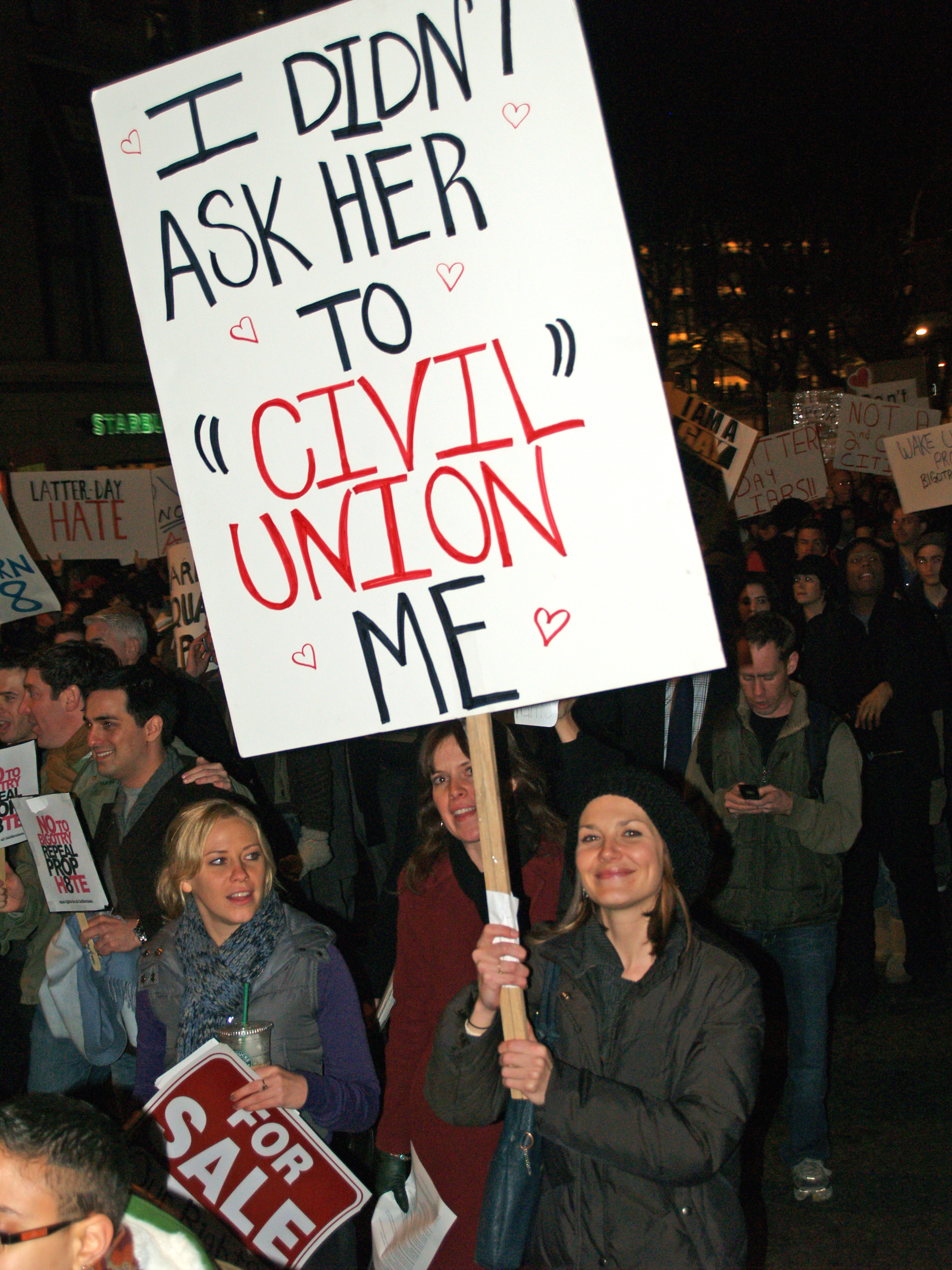
The notion of civil unions is rejected by some, such as this protester at a large demonstration in New York City against California Proposition 8.

The terms used to designate civil unions are not standardised and vary widely from country to country. Government-sanctioned relationships that may be similar or equivalent to civil unions include civil partnerships, registered partnerships, domestic partnerships, significant relationships, reciprocal beneficiary relationships, common-law marriage, adult interdependent relationships, life partnerships, stable unions, civil solidarity pacts, and so on. The exact level of rights, benefits, obligations, and responsibilities also varies, depending on the laws of a particular country. Some jurisdictions allow same-sex couples to adopt, while others forbid them to do so, or allow adoption only in specified circumstances. In the United States, the term civil union was introduced in the state of Vermont in 2000 to connote a status equivalent to marriage for same-sex couples; it was chosen by the state's legislators in preference to phrases such as "domestic partner relationship" or "civil accord".

Domestic partnership, offered by some states, counties, cities, and employers since as early as 1985, has generally connoted a lesser status with fewer benefits. However, the legislatures of the West Coast states of California, Oregon and Washington have preferred the term domestic partnership for enactments similar or equivalent to civil union laws in East Coast states. Civil unions are not seen as a replacement for marriage by many in the LGBT community. "Marriage in the United States is a civil union; a civil union, as it has come to be called, is not marriage", said Evan Wolfson of Freedom to Marry. "It is a proposed hypothetical legal mechanism, since it doesn't exist in most places, to give some of the protections but also withhold something precious from gay people. There's no good reason to do that." However, some opponents of same-sex marriage claim that civil unions rob marriage of its unique status; Randy Thomasson, executive director of the Campaign for California Families, calls civil unions "homosexual marriage by another name" and contends that civil unions provide same-sex couples "all the rights of marriage available under state law". The California Supreme Court, in the In Re Marriage Cases decision, noted nine differences in state law.

Civil unions are commonly criticised as being 'separate but equal'; critics such as former New Zealand MP and feminist Marilyn Waring note that same-sex couples remain excluded from the right to marry and are forced to use a separate institution. Supporters of same-sex marriage contend that treating same-sex couples differently from other couples under the law allows for inferior treatment and that if civil unions were the same as marriage there would be no reason for two separate laws. A New Jersey commission which reviewed the state's civil union law reported that the law "invites and encourages unequal treatment of same-sex couples and their children". Some have suggested that creating civil unions which are open to opposite-sex couples would avoid the accusations of apartheid.

Proponents of civil unions say that they provide practical equality for same-sex couples and solve the problems over areas such as hospital visitation rights and transfer of property caused by lack of legal recognition. Proponents also say that creating civil unions is a more pragmatic way to ensure that same-sex couples have legal rights as it avoids the more controversial issues surrounding marriage and the claim that the term has a religious source. Many supporters of same-sex marriage state that the word "marriage" matters and that the term "civil union" and its equivalents do not convey the emotional meaning or bring the respect that comes with marriage. Former US Solicitor General and attorney in the Perry v. Schwarzenegger case Theodore Olsen said that recognizing same-sex couples under the term "domestic partnership" stigmatizes gay people's relationships, treating them as if they were "something akin to a commercial venture, not a loving union". Many also contend that the fact that civil unions are often not understood can cause difficulty for same-sex couples in emergency situations.

== List of jurisdictions recognizing same-sex unions but not same-sex marriage ==
As of June 12, 2025, the states that provide civil unions but not marriage for same-sex couples are:

- Bolivia
- Croatia
- Cyprus
- Czechia
- Hungary
- Italy
- Latvia
- Lithuania
- Monaco
- Montenegro
- San Marino
- the British territories of Bermuda and Cayman Islands

In Israel, no national domestic authority performs same-sex marriage, though couples may marry abroad. In addition, same-sex couples may be considered to have a common-law marriage, which affords "most" of the rights of marriage.

== List of jurisdictions recognizing same-sex unions ==
Civil unions for same-sex couples Civil unions in some counties Civil unions not performed

The following is a list of countries and other jurisdictions which have established civil unions for same-sex couples or opposite-sex couples, categorized by continent, with the year in which the law establishing civil unions in the listed country or other jurisdiction came into effect in brackets:

=== Africa ===
- South Africa (2006; civil partnership; Afrikaans: burgerlike verbintenis)

=== Americas ===
- Costa Rica (1995; Spanish: unión de hecho)
- United States:
  - Hawaii (reciprocal beneficiary relationship since 1997, civil union since 2012)
  - New York City (1998, domestic partnership)
  - California (1999; domestic partnership)
  - District of Columbia (2002, domestic partnership)
  - Maine (2004; domestic partnership)
  - New Jersey (domestic partnership since 2004, civil union since 2006)
  - Washington (2007; domestic partnership)
  - Maryland (2008; domestic partnership)
  - Oregon (2008; domestic partnership)
  - Colorado (designated beneficiary agreement since 2009, civil union since 2013)
  - Nevada (2009; domestic partnership)
  - Illinois (2011; civil union)
- France (French: pacte civil de solidarité)
  - French Guiana (1999)
  - Guadeloupe (1999)
  - Martinique (1999)
  - Saint Barthélemy (1999)
  - Saint Martin (1999)
  - Saint-Pierre and Miquelon (1999)
- Canada:
  - Nova Scotia (2001; domestic partnership)
  - Quebec (2002; civil union / union civile)
  - Alberta (2003; adult interdependent relationship)
  - Manitoba (2004; registered common-law relationship)
- Mexico:
  - Coahuila (2007; Spanish: pacto civil de solidaridad)
  - Mexico City (2007, sociedad de convivencia)
  - Campeche (2013; sociedad civil de convivencia)
  - Michoacán (2015; sociedad de convivencia)
  - Tlaxcala (2017; sociedad de convivencia solidaria)
  - Veracruz (2020; concubinato)
  - Sinaloa (2021; concubinato)
- Uruguay (2008; Spanish: unión concubinaria)
- Ecuador (2008; Spanish: unión de hecho)
- Colombia (2009; Spanish: unión marital de hecho)
- Brazil (2011, opposite sex since 2003; Portuguese: união estável)
- Netherlands: (Dutch: geregistreerd partnerschap)
  - Caribbean Netherlands (2012)
  - Aruba (2021; Papiamento: union civil; Dutch: geregistreerd partnerschap)
- Argentina: (2015; Spanish: unión convivencial)
  - Buenos Aires (2003; Spanish: unión civil)
  - (Río Negro Province) Río Negro (2003; pareja convivencial homosexual)
  - City of Villa Carlos Paz (2007; unión civil)
  - City of Río Cuarto (2009; unión civil)
- Chile (2015; Spanish: acuerdo de unión civil)
- United Kingdom:
  - Falkland Islands (2017; civil partnership)
  - Bermuda (2018; domestic partnership)
  - Cayman Islands (2020; civil partnership)
- Bolivia (free unions starting in 2020, nationwide since 2023; Spanish: unión libre)

=== Asia ===
- Japan (Japanese: パートナーシップ宣誓制度 or パートナーシップ証明制度)
  - Ibaraki (2019)
  - Osaka (2020)
  - Gunma (2020)
  - Saga (2021)
  - Mie (2021)
  - Aomori (2022)
  - Akita (2022)
  - Fukuoka (2022)
  - Tochigi (2022)
  - Tokyo (2022)
  - Shizuoka (2023)
  - Toyama (2023)
  - Nagano (2023)
  - Gifu (2023)
  - Kagawa (2023)
  - Shimane (2023)
  - Tottori (2023)
  - Fukui (2023)
  - Yamanashi (2023)
  - Yamagata (2024)
  - Wakayama (2024)
  - Aichi (2024)
  - Hyōgo (2024)
  - Nara (2024)
  - Ōita (2024)
  - Tokushima (2024)
  - Yamaguchi (2024)
  - Fukushima (2024)
  - Niigata (2024)
  - Shiga (2024)
  - Okinawa (2025)
  - 566 municipalities

=== Europe ===
- Netherlands (1998; Dutch: geregistreerd partnerschap)
- Spain:
  - Catalonia (1998; Catalan: parella estable, Spanish: pareja estable, Occitan: coble estable)
  - Aragon (1999; Spanish: pareja estable)
  - Castile-La Mancha (2000; pareja de hecho)
  - Navarra (2000; Spanish: pareja estable, Basque: bikote egonkorra)
  - Valencia (2001; Spanish: unión de hecho, Valencian: unió de fet)
  - Balearic Islands (2002; Catalan: parella estable, Spanish: pareja estable)
  - Andalusia (2002; pareja de hecho)
  - Asturias (2002; Spanish: pareja estable, Asturian: pareya estable)
  - Madrid (2002; unión de hecho)
  - Castile and León (2002; unión de hecho)
  - Extremadura (2003; pareja de hecho)
  - Basque Country (2003; Basque: izatezko bikote, Spanish: pareja de hecho)
  - Cantabria (2005; Spanish: pareja de hecho)
  - Galicia (2008; Galician: parella de feito, Spanish: pareja de hecho)
  - La Rioja (2010; pareja de hecho)
  - Murcia (2018; pareja de hecho)
- France (1999; French: pacte civil de solidarité)
- Belgium (2000; Dutch: wettelijke samenwoning, French: cohabitation légale, German: gesetzliches Zusammenwohnen)
- Portugal (2001; Portuguese: união de facto) opposite-sex since 1999.
- Luxembourg (2004; French: partenariat, Luxembourgish and German: Partnerschaft)
- Andorra (2005; Catalan: unió estable de parella)
- United Kingdom (2005; civil partnership, Welsh: partneriaeth sifil)
  - Isle of Man (2011; civil partnership)
  - Jersey (2012; civil partnership)
  - Gibraltar (2014; civil partnership)
- Czech Republic (2006; Czech: registrované partnerství)
- Hungary (2009; Hungarian: bejegyzett élettársi kapcsolat)
- Austria (2010; German: eingetragene Partnerschaft)
- Liechtenstein (2011; German: eingetragene Partnerschaft)
- Malta (2014; civil union, Maltese: unjoni ċivili)
- Croatia (2014; Croatian: životno partnerstvo)
- Cyprus (2015; Greek: πολιτική συμβίωση, Turkish: sivil birlikte yaşama)
- Greece (2015; Greek: σύμφωνο συμβίωσης) opposite-sex since 2008.
- Estonia (2016; Estonian: kooseluleping)
- Italy (2016; Italian: unione civile)
- San Marino (2018; Italian: unione civile)
- Monaco (2020; French: contrat de vie commune, Monégasque: contràtto de vìtta comûne)
- Montenegro (2021; Montenegrin: животно партнерство, životno partnerstvo)
- Latvia (2024; Latvian: partnerība)
- Lithuania (2025, through courts only; Lithuanian: partnerystė)

=== Oceania ===
- Australia:
  - Tasmania (2004; significant relationship and caring relationship)
  - South Australia (domestic partnership since 2007, registered relationship since 2017)
  - Australian Capital Territory (domestic relationship since 1994)
  - Victoria (2008; domestic relationship)
  - New South Wales (de facto couple since 1999, registered relationship since 2010)
  - Queensland (de facto recognition since 1999, civil partnership since 2012)
- New Zealand (2005; civil union, Māori: hononga ā-ture)
- France (French: pacte civil de solidarité)
  - New Caledonia (2009)
  - Wallis and Futuna (2009)

=== Countries with former civil unions ===
Gender-neutral civil unions Civil unions for opposite-sex couples only Civil unions for same-sex couples only Former civil unions for same-sex couples, replaced by marriage Civil unions not performed

Several countries used to offer civil unions only for same-sex couples. The laws that allowed civil unions were repealed when same-sex marriage was legalized. The following is a list of countries and other jurisdictions that used to offer civil unions for same-sex couples with the years in which they were available in brackets:

==== Europe ====
- Denmark (1989–2012; Danish: registreret partnerskab)
  - Greenland (1996–2016; Greenlandic: nalunaarsukkamik inooqatigiinneq)
- Norway (1993–2008; Norwegian: registrert partnerskap, Northern Sami: registrerejuvvon párragaskavuohta, Lule Sami: registardum guojmmevuohta; Southern Sami: tjaalasovveme guejmievoete)
- Sweden (1995–2009; Swedish: registrerat partnerskap)
- Iceland (1996–2010; Icelandic: staðfesta samvist)
- Germany (2001–2017; German: eingetragene Lebenspartnerschaft)
- Finland (2002–2017; Finnish: rekisteröity parisuhde, Swedish: registrerat partnerskap)
- Slovenia (2006–2016 as partnerska skupnost; 2016–2022 as partnerska zveza)
- Switzerland (2007–2022; German: eingetragene Partnerschaft, French: partenariat enregistré, Italian: unione domestica registrata, Romansh: partenadi registrà)
  - Geneva (2001–2022)
  - Zurich (2002–2022)
  - Neuchâtel (2004–2022)
  - Fribourg (2005–2022)
- Ireland (2010–2015; civil partnership, Irish: páirtnéireacht shibhialta)
- Andorra (2014–2023; Catalan: unió civil)

==== Americas ====
- United States:
  - Vermont (2000–2009; civil union)
  - Connecticut (2005–2010; civil union)
  - New Hampshire (2008–2010; civil union)
  - Wisconsin (2009–2018; domestic partnership)
  - Rhode Island (2011–2013; civil union)
  - Delaware (2011–2013; civil union)
- Mexico:
  - Colima (2013–2016; Spanish: enlace conyugal)
  - Jalisco (2014–2018; Spanish: libre convivencia)

==== Asia ====
- Taiwan (Chinese: 同性伴侶註記)
  - Special municipalities (6/6)
    - Kaohsiung (2015–2019)
    - Taipei (2015–2019)
    - Taichung (2015–2019)
    - Tainan (2016–2019)
    - New Taipei (2016–2019)
    - Taoyuan (2016–2019)
  - Provincial cities (3/3)
    - Chiayi (2016–2019)
    - Hsinchu (2017–2019)
    - Keelung (2017–2019)
  - Counties (9/13)
    - Changhua County (2016–2019)
    - Hsinchu County (2016–2019)
    - Yilan County (2016–2019)
    - Chiayi County (2016–2019)
    - Kinmen County (2017–2019)
    - Lienchiang County (2017–2019)
    - Miaoli County (2017–2019)
    - Nantou County (2017–2019)
    - Pingtung County (2017–2019)

==== Oceania ====
- Australia:
  - Australian Capital Territory (civil partnership since 2008; civil union between 2012 and 2017)

== Case studies ==
=== Argentina ===
Since 2003, the Argentine province of Río Negro and the city of Buenos Aires allow domestic partnerships. The City of Villa Carlos Paz (Córdoba) allowed it from 2007. Since 2009, the city of Río Cuarto (Córdoba) allows Civil Unions.

=== Australia ===
All levels of Australian governments under nearly all Australian statutes recognise same-sex couples as de facto couples as unregistered co-habitation or de facto status since 2009. From 1 July 2009, Centrelink recognised same-sex couples equally regarding social security – under the common-law marriage, de facto status or unregistered cohabitation.

Registered relationship recognition in state governments

State or territory	Official relationship status	Year of enactment
Australian Capital Territory	Yes Civil partnership	2008
New South Wales	Yes Registered relationship	2010
Queensland	Yes Civil partnership	2012
Tasmania	Yes Significant relationship	2004
Victoria	Yes Registered domestic relationship	2008
South Australia	Yes Registered relationship	2017

Registered relationship recognition in five local government areas within Australia

- City of Sydney, New South Wales – Registered relationships since 2004
- Municipality of Woollahra, New South Wales – Registered relationships since 2008
- City of the Blue Mountains, New South Wales – Registered relationships since 2010
- City of Vincent, Western Australia – Registered relationships since 2012
- Town of Port Hedland, Western Australia – Registered relationships since 2015.

=== Brazil ===
Countries performing civil unions in South America Gender-neutral civil unions Civil unions for opposite-sex couples only Civil unions never performed

Cohabitation grants 112 benefits as family entities in Brazil since 2002. It is known as união estável when both parts are legally authorized to marry, and as concubinato when at least one party is legally prohibited from doing so. Cohabitation grants all rights marriage confers, with the exception of automatic opt-in for one of four systems of property share married couples have access to, and automatic right to inheritance. Potential confusion might arise regarding terminology, given how when Brazilian Portuguese refers to the term união civil, it tends to be short for casamento civil, or civil marriage. Couples that have at least one child registered as a descendant of both parties might also have access to união estável or concubinato rights.

Same-sex stable cohabitation in Brazil is legally recognized nationwide since May 5, 2011. Brazil's Supreme Court voted 10–0 with one abstention to allow same-sex couples the same legal rights as married couples, following pointed recognition of such relationships that dates as far back as 2004. The ruling gave same-sex couples in such relationships the same financial and social rights enjoyed by those in mixed-sex ones. A union between two women and one man was reported in August 2012, though its legality was doubted.

=== Canada ===
Jurisdictions performing civil unions in North America Gender-neutral civil unions Former civil unions for same-sex couples, replaced by marriage Civil unions never performed

In Canada:

- Domestic partnerships in Nova Scotia (2001),
- Civil unions in Quebec (2002),
- Registered common-law relationships in Manitoba (2002), (Note: Manitoba law allows for same- and opposite-sex couples to voluntarily register their common-law relationship with the provincial vital statistics agency, as an alternative to the requirement to cohabit for a minimum period of time.)
- Adult interdependent relationships in Alberta (2003)

were extended to same-sex couples before the enactment of the federal Civil Marriage Act which legalized same-sex marriage in Canada nationally. The 1994 proposed Equality Rights Statute Amendment Act in Ontario was a notable early attempt to introduce a status similar to civil unions. It was supported by the provincial government but was defeated in the legislature.

Some provinces and territories amended their family law to extend statutory benefits to same-sex couples that were equivalent to those granted to unmarried cohabiting opposite-sex couples without establishing a specific name for the partnership. For example, Ontario was required to amend its family law legislation in 1999 in response to the Supreme Court of Canada's ruling in M v H.

=== Colombia ===
In 2007, Colombia came close to passing a law granting legal recognition to same-sex couples, but the bill failed on final passage in one house of the national legislature. However, a court decision in October 2007 extended social security and health insurance rights to same-sex couples. On January 29, 2009, the Constitutional Court ruled that cohabitating same-sex couples must be given all rights offered to unmarried heterosexual couples, making Colombia the first Latin American country to fully grant this right to all its citizens. Couples can claim these rights after living together for two years. The Constitutional Court of Colombia upheld same-sex marriage rights in 2016.

=== Costa Rica ===
The Legislative Assembly of Costa Rica passed a bill in early July 2013 that "confers social rights and benefits of a civil union, free from discrimination", language inserted by lawmaker José María Villalta Florez-Estrada of the Broad Front party. After the bill passed, several media outlets reported that conservative lawmakers realized the bill's implications for same-sex unions and urged President Laura Chinchilla, who is set to face Villalta in the 2014 presidential election, to use her veto power to stop the bill from becoming law. Chinchilla, who has suggested the courts should determine the legality of same-sex unions in Costa Rica, refused and signed the bill into law on 4 July. A gay couple has filed an appeal with the Supreme Court of Justice of Costa Rica asking that their union be recognized under the new law. Gay rights activists reacting to the law said it needs to survive a constitutional challenge in court. Some constitutional lawyers stated that same-sex couples will "still lack legal capacity" to formalize their unions, despite passage of the bill.

=== Ecuador ===
The 2008 Constitution of Ecuador enacted civil unions between two people without regard to gender, giving same-sex couples the same rights as legally married heterosexual couples except for the right to adopt.

=== Europe ===
Countries performing civil unions in Europe Gender-neutral civil unions Civil unions for same-sex couples only Former civil unions for same-sex couples, replaced by marriage Civil unions never performed

In Europe:

- Denmark (1989–2012; same-sex only)
- Norway (1993–2009; same-sex only)
- Sweden (1995–2009; same-sex only)
- Iceland (1996–2010; same-sex only)
- Greenland (1996–2016; same-sex only)
- Netherlands (1998; gender-neutral)
- France (1999; gender-neutral)
- Belgium (2000; gender-neutral)
- Germany (2001–2017; same-sex only)
- Finland (2002–2017; same-sex only)
- Luxembourg (2004; gender-neutral)
- Andorra (2005; gender-neutral)
- United Kingdom (2005, same-sex only; gender-neutral in England and Wales since 2019, in Northern Ireland since 2020, in Scotland since 2021)
- Czech Republic (2006; same-sex only)
- Slovenia (2006–2022; same-sex only)
- Switzerland (2007–2022; same-sex only)
- Greece (2008; initially opposite-sex only, gender-neutral since 2015 )
- Hungary (2009; same-sex only)
- Austria (2010; same-sex only, gender-neutral since 2019)
- Ireland (2011–2015; same-sex only)
- Isle of Man (2011; same-sex only, gender-neutral since 2016)
- Liechtenstein (2011; same-sex only)
- Jersey (2012; same-sex only, gender-neutral since 2023)
- Gibraltar (2014; gender-neutral)
- Malta (2014; gender-neutral)
- Croatia (2014; same-sex only)
- Andorra (2014–2023; same-sex only)
- Cyprus (2015; gender-neutral)
- Estonia (2016; gender-neutral)
- Italy (2016; same-sex only)
- San Marino (2018; gender-neutral)
- Monaco (2020; gender-neutral)
- Montenegro (2021; same-sex only)
- Latvia (2024; gender-neutral)
- Lithuania (2025; gender-neutral)

==== Austria ====
In 2018, Minister of Justice Josef Moser announced that both marriage and registered partnership would be open to homosexuals and heterosexuals. This occurred because Helga Ratzenböck and Martin Seydl have been appealing for years in court for a registered civil partnership in Austria. At the European Court of Human Rights in Strasbourg they attempted to sue Austria for discrimination against their sexuality, because they were a heterosexual couple and were excluded from the benefits of registered partnership, but this failed. Only when the Constitutional Court of Austria opened up marriage to homosexuals in December 2018 registered partnerships also become possible for heterosexuals. After 35 years of living together, the two entered into a registered partnership in 2019.

==== Denmark ====
Civil unions were introduced in Denmark by law on 7 June 1989, the world's first such law, and came into effect on 1 October 1989. On 7 June 2012, the law was replaced by a new same-sex marriage law, which came into effect on 15 June 2012. Registered partnership was by civil ceremony only, but the Church of Denmark allowed priests to perform blessings of same-sex couples, as it stated that the church blesses people, not institutions. The new law makes same-sex marriages in churches possible, but allows vicars to decline marriages of same-sex couples in their church. On 17 March 2009, the Folketing introduced a bill that gave same-sex couples in registered partnerships the right to adopt jointly. This bill was approved on 4 May 2010 and took effect on 1 July 2010.

==== Estonia ====
Registered partnerships that provide some of the rights, benefits, and obligations of marriage have been available to same-sex couples since 1 January 2016.

==== France ====
PACS (blue) and marriage (red) in France (INSEE)

The French law providing benefits to same-sex couples also applies to opposite-sex couples who choose this form of partnership over marriage. Known as the "Pacte civil de solidarité" (PACS), it is more easily dissolved than the divorce process applying to marriage. Tax benefits accrue immediately (only from 2007 on), while immigration benefits accrue only after the contract has been in effect for one year. The partners are required to have a common address, making it difficult for foreigners to use this law as a means to a residence permit, and difficult for French citizens to gain the right to live with a foreign partner – especially since the contract does not automatically give immigration rights, as marriage does. Between 2000 and 2010, the number of marriages decreased while the number of PACS strongly increased. In 2010, there were 3 PACS for every 4 marriages celebrated in France. Especially amongst heterosexual couples PACS is very popular, with 96 out of 100 PACS couples being heterosexual in the year 2019.

Countries performing civil unions in Central America and the Caribbean Islands Gender-neutral civil unions Civil unions for opposite-sex couples only Civil unions never performed

==== Germany ====
Civil unions in Germany began in 2001.

In 2017, registered life partnership was replaced with marriage, with any couple regardless of sex allowed to marry.

==== Greece ====
Greek parliament voted in favor of a Cohabitation Pact (Greek: Σύμφωνο Συμβίωσης) giving almost the same rights as marriage to couples regardless of their sex. The draft was approved in the relevant Greek parliamentary committee, and during voting on 22 December 2015, the law was passed with 194 positive votes (out of 300).

==== Hungary ====
Civil unions in Hungary began in 2009.

==== Iceland ====
Iceland does not have a comprehensive legal act on civil unions (Icelandic: óvígð sambúð). Instead, various laws deal with civil unions and their meaning. When Iceland legalised same-sex marriages in 2010, the Act on Registered Partnerships (87/1996) was abolished. Registered partnerships (Icelandic: staðfest samvist) had been the principal legal unions for same-sex partners since the law was passed in 1996.

==== Ireland ====
In 2010, the lower house of the Irish Parliament Dáil Éireann passed the bill on Civil Partnerships unanimously. This bill allows civil partnerships of same-sex couples, and establishes an extensive package of rights, obligations and protections for same-sex couples who register as civil partners. The bill passed all stages of in both Houses of the Oireachtas, and came into effect on 1 January 2011. The first partnership between two men was registered on 7 February 2011. Same-sex marriage has been legal in Ireland since 2015 following a referendum.

==== Italy ====
Legal recognition of same-sex civil unions in Italy began in 2016.

==== Liechtenstein ====
Civil unions in Liechtenstein began in 2011.

==== Monaco ====
Civil unions in Monaco began in 2020.

==== Montenegro ====
Civil unions in Montenegro began in 2020.

==== Netherlands ====
In 2001, the Netherlands passed a law allowing same-sex couples to marry, in addition to its 1998 "registered partnership" law (civil union) for both same-sex and opposite-sex couples.

==== Poland ====
In 2003, Senator Maria Szyszkowska proposed a bill which would legalize same-sex civil unions in Poland. The project was approved by the Senate but was never voted upon by the Sejm, as Włodzimierz Cimoszewicz (then the Marshal of the Sejm) did not bring it for the deliberation. In 2008, when asked about same-sex civil unions, First Cabinet of Donald Tusk spokeswoman Agnieszka Liszka answered: "Council of Ministers did not and would not take care of that matter."

On January 25, 2013, Sejm voted upon three separate bills regarding same-sex civil unions in Poland: by the centre-left Democratic Left Alliance, liberal Palikot's Movement and centre-right Civic Platform. The first bill had 283 against, 137 for, 30 abstaining. The second had 276 against, 150 for, 23 abstaining. The third had 228 against, 211 for, 10 abstaining. All three were rejected, mainly with the votes of centre-right, right-wing and conservative parties: Polish People's Party, Law and Justice and United Poland. A majority of deputies from the ruling centre-right Civic Platform also voted against the first two bills. The Roman Catholic Church in Poland, Polish Orthodox Church, and Polish Muslims opposed all three bills.

In March 2013, Prime Minister Donald Tusk officially stated that a new project of civil unions bill would be presented to the parliament "in two months time" (in May 2013), but as of April 2014 no such initiatives took place. In a 2013 opinion poll conducted by CBOS, 68% of Poles were against gays and lesbians publicly showing their way of life, 65% of Poles were against same-sex civil unions, 72% were against same-sex marriage and 88% were against adoption by same-sex couples. In December 2014, the Sejm refused to deal with a civil partnership bill proposed by Your Movement, with 235 MPs voting against debating the bill, and 185 MPs voting for. In May 2015, the Sejm again refused to deal with the topic, with 215 MPs voting against and only 146 for. The Prime Minister, Ewa Kopacz, said that civil partnerships are an issue for the next parliament to deal with.

==== San Marino ====
San Marino has recognized civil unions for both same-sex and opposite-sex couples since December 2018.

==== Slovenia ====
Slovenia recognized same-sex partnerships since 2006.

==== Switzerland ====
The Canton of Geneva has a law on the cantonal level, the Partenariat cantonal (the Cantonal Domestic Partnership), since 2001. It grants unmarried couples, whether same-sex or opposite-sex, many of the rights, responsibilities and protections that married couples have. However, it does not allow benefits in taxation, social security, or health insurance premiums (unlike the federal law). Geneva was the first Canton to recognise same-sex couples through this law. On September 22, 2002, voters in the Swiss canton of Zurich voted to extend a number of marriage rights to same-sex partners, including tax, inheritance, and social security benefits. The law is limited to same-sex couples, and both partners must have lived in the canton for six months and formally commit to running a household together and supporting and aiding each another. On November 12, 2003, the Constituent assembly of the Canton of Fribourg granted Registered Partnership as a constitutional right under the Article 14.

On January 27, 2004, the Canton of Neuchâtel voted for a law on the cantonal level, the Partenariat enregistré (the Cantonal Registered Partnership). It grants unmarried couples, whether same-sex or opposite-sex, the same rights as married couple for cantonal matters such as responsibilities and protections, benefits in taxation, social security, or health insurance premiums. On June 5, 2005, voters extended this right to the whole of Switzerland through a federal referendum. This was the first time that the civil union laws were affirmed in a nationwide referendum in any country. The Federal Domestic Partnership Law, reserved for same-sex couples, came into force on January 1, 2007. It grants the same rights as marriage, but full joint adoption rights, facilitated naturalization and medically assisted procreation are explicitly forbidden for same-sex domestic partners.

In 2017, the Federal Councilor Simonetta Sommaruga addressed the issue that civil union is not open yet for heterosexual couples, in collaboration with experts at the University of Bern. In Geneva and Neuchâtel a type of civil union called cantonal PACS is available to opposite-sex and same-sex couples. The cantonal PACS effects are limited to cantonal law. The cantonal PACS, however, has no impact on civil status and inheritance, which are regulated by federal law. On September 26, 2021, the people of Switzerland approved on national referendum the initiative "Marriage for all", which would grant marriage and adoption rights for same-sex couples. This initiative would be made effective on July 1, 2022.

==== United Kingdom ====
In 2003, the British government announced plans to introduce civil partnerships which would allow same-sex couples the rights and responsibilities resulting from marriage. The Civil Partnership Bill was introduced into the House of Lords on 30 March 2004. After considering amendments made by the House of Commons, it was passed by the House of Lords, its final legislative step, on 17 November 2004, and received royal assent on 18 November. The Act came into force on 5 December 2005, and same-sex, but not opposite-sex, couples were able to form the civil partnerships from 19 December 2005 in Northern Ireland, 20 December 2005 in Scotland and 21 December 2005 in England and Wales. Separate provisions were included in the first Finance Act 2005 to allow regulations to be made to amend tax laws to give the same tax advantages and disadvantages to couples in civil partnerships as apply to married couples. At that time, the Church of England, the state church in England, permitted clergy to enter into same-sex civil partnerships.

Aside from the manner in which couples register and the non-use of the word "marriage", civil partnerships grant most of the same legal rights as marriage and generally operate under the same constrictions (one difference being that marriage requires dissolution by divorce while a civil union does not). It is not legal to be in both a civil partnership and a marriage at the same time. Nevertheless, some of those in favour of legal same-sex marriage object that civil partnerships do not grant full equality. Both same-sex marriages and civil unions of other nations will be automatically considered civil partnerships under UK law providing they came within Section 20 of the Act. This means, in some cases, non-Britons from nations with civil unions will have greater rights in the UK than in their native countries. For example, a Vermont civil union would have legal standing in the UK; however, in cases where one partner was American and the other British, the Vermont civil union would not provide the Briton with right of abode in Vermont (or any other US state or territory), whereas it would provide the American with right of abode in the UK.

In September 2011, the succeeding coalition government announced its intention to legalise same-sex marriage in England and Wales by 2015 at the latest. The future status of civil partnerships is unclear. The Scottish Government, which has devolved responsibility for such legislation, held a public consultation concerning both civil and religious same sex marriage from 2 September – 9 December 2011. Legislation to allow same-sex marriage in England and Wales was passed by the Parliament of the United Kingdom in July 2013 and came into force on 13 March 2014, and the first same-sex marriages took place on 29 March 2014. The first same-sex marriages in Scotland took place in December 2014. In June 2018, the Supreme Court ruled that restricting civil partnerships to same-sex couples was discriminatory. In response, the Prime Minister announced in October 2018 that civil partnerships would be opened to heterosexual couples. In autumn 2018 Theresa May announced that she would open up the "Civil Partnership" to heterosexual couples in England. As of 31st December 2019 it is possible for both same-sex and heterosexual couples to enter into a civil partnership in England.

=== Mexico ===
States performing civil unions in Mexico Gender-neutral civil unions Former civil unions for same-sex couples, replaced by marriage Civil unions never performed

On 9 November 2006, Mexico City's unicameral Legislative Assembly passed and approved (43–17) a bill legalizing same-sex civil unions, under the name Ley de Sociedades de Convivencia (Law for Co-existence Partnerships), which became effective on 16 March 2007. The law gives property and inheritance rights to same-sex couples. On 11 January 2007, the northern state of Coahuila, which borders Texas, passed a similar bill (20–13), under the name Pacto Civil de Solidaridad (Civil Pact of Solidarity). Unlike Mexico City's law, once same-sex couples have registered in Coahuila, the state protects their rights no matter where they live in the country. Twenty days after the law had passed, the country's first same-sex civil union took place in Saltillo, Coahuila. Civil unions have been proposed in at least six states since 2006. In Colima, governor Mario Anguiano Moreno agreed to discuss the legalization of civil unions and adoption by same-sex couples. In Jalisco, local congress approved on 31 October 2013 the Free Coexistence Act, which allows the performance of civil unions in the state.

=== New Zealand ===
Countries performing civil unions in Oceania Gender-neutral civil unions Civil unions never performed

On 9 December 2004, the New Zealand Parliament passed the Civil Union Bill, establishing civil unions for same-sex and opposite-sex couples. The debate over Civil Unions was highly divisive in New Zealand, inspiring great public emotion both for and against the passing. A companion bill, the Relationships (Statutory References) Bill was passed shortly thereafter to remove discriminatory provisions on the basis of relationship status from a range of statutes and regulations. As a result of these bills, all couples in New Zealand, whether married, in a civil union, or in a de facto partnership, now generally enjoy the same rights and undertake the same obligations. These rights extend to immigration, next-of-kin status, social welfare, matrimonial property and other areas. The Civil Union Act 2004 came into effect on 26 April 2005 with the first unions able to occur from Friday 29 April 2005.

=== South Africa ===
Countries performing civil unions in Africa Gender-neutral civil unions Civil unions never performed

In South Africa, a "civil union" is either a marriage or a civil partnership, although the term "civil union" is commonly used when "civil partnership" is meant. Same-sex and opposite-sex couples may register their unions either as marriages or as civil partnerships. This was achieved through the Civil Union Act, 2006. In laws where "marriage" is mentioned, its definition now retroactively includes civil partnerships.

=== United States ===
States performing civil unions Civil union Civil union with limited rights Civil unions not performed Civil unions forbidden

The first civil unions in the United States were offered by the state of Vermont in 2000. The federal government does not recognize these unions. By the end of 2006, Connecticut and New Jersey had also enacted civil union laws; New Hampshire followed in 2007. Furthermore, California's domestic partnership law had been expanded to the point that it became practically a civil union law as well. The same might be said for domestic partnership in the District of Columbia, domestic partnership in Washington, and domestic partnership in Oregon. Jurisdictions in the U.S. that offer civil unions or domestic partnerships granting nearly all of the state-recognized rights of marriage to same-sex couples include:

- Domestic partnership in California (2000 – expanded over time)
- Domestic partnership in the District of Columbia (1992 law implemented, 2002 became effective – expanded over time)
- Civil union in Hawaii (2012)
- Civil union in Illinois (2011)
- Domestic partnership in Nevada (2009)
- Civil union in New Jersey (2007)
- Domestic partnership in Oregon (2008)
- Civil union in Rhode Island (2011)
- Domestic partnership in Washington State (2007 – expanded over time)

States in the U.S. with domestic partnerships or similar status granting some of the rights of marriage include:

- Designated beneficiary agreement in Colorado (2009)
- Reciprocal beneficiary relationship in Hawaii (1997)
- Domestic partnership in Maine (2004)

Since October 2014, all states that provide for civil unions, domestic partnerships, or similar arrangements between same-sex partners also allow same-sex partners to legally wed.

==== Arizona ====
In 2013, Bisbee became the first city in Arizona to legalize civil unions for same-sex couples. After its passage, the state's Attorney General, Tom Horne, threatened to challenge the law in court, arguing that it violated the state's constitution. However, the Attorney General agreed to withdraw the challenge after Bisbee amended the law, and the civil union ordinance was approved.

Following Bisbee, also in 2013, Tucson became the second municipality to legalize civil unions. Jerome followed in the same year. Also in 2013, Clarkdale and Cottonwood were the next cities in the Verde Valley to pass civil unions. A measure to allow civil unions failed in Camp Verde by a split 3–3 vote in the city council making it the only city in the Verde Valley to not have passed the bill.

Sedona passed civil unions in September 2013. The city of Tempe considered legal advice about a civil union ordinance, but it did not pass a bill. After the legalization of same-sex marriage in Arizona, civil unions may continue to be registered in the cities that had legalized the ordinances.

==== California ====
In California, where domestic partnership (DP) has been available to same-sex and certain opposite-sex couples since 2000, a wholesale revision of the law in 2005 made it substantially equivalent to marriage at the state level. In 2007, the Legislature took a further step when it required same-sex DP couples to file state income taxes jointly. (Couples must continue to file federal taxes as individuals.) In the May 2008 In re Marriage Cases decision, the state supreme court noted nine differences between Domestic Partnerships and same-sex marriage in state law, including a cohabitation requirement for domestic partners, access to CalPERS long-term care insurance (but not CalPERS in general), and the lack of an equivalent to California's "confidential marriage" institution. The cohabitation requirement was dropped on January 1, 2012, and a "confidential option" for domestic partners became available the same day.

==== Colorado ====
A bill to establish civil unions for same-sex and opposite-sex couples passed both chambers of the Colorado legislature and was signed into law by Governor John Hickenlooper. Civil unions began on May 1, 2013.

==== Connecticut ====
In 2005, the Connecticut General Assembly passed a bill to adopt civil unions in Connecticut. Connecticut's civil unions were identical to marriage and provided all of the same rights and responsibilities except for the title. Connecticut was the first state in the U.S. to voluntarily pass a same-sex civil unions law through the legislature without any immediate court intervention. The law was repealed on October 1, 2010, and replaced with a law making marriage gender-neutral.

==== Delaware ====
Delaware Governor Jack Markell signed a civil union bill on May 12, 2011, that establishes civil unions in the state effective January 1, 2012. The law was repealed on July 1, 2014, and replaced with a law making marriage gender-neutral.

==== District of Columbia ====
Same-sex marriage in the District of Columbia was legalized on December 18, 2009. Marriage licenses became available on March 3, 2010, and marriages began on March 9, 2010. Legislation on domestic partnerships in the District of Columbia was first passed in 1992, implemented in 2002, and expanded over time up to 2009.

==== Hawaii ====
Hawaii legalized civil unions for same-sex and opposite-sex couples on January 1, 2012. Same-sex marriage became legal on December 2, 2013.

==== Illinois ====
On December 1, 2010, the Illinois state senate passed SB1716 – the "Illinois Religious Freedom Protection and Civil Union Act" – in a 32–24–1 vote, just one day after the Illinois House of Representatives did the same in a 61–52–2 vote. On January 31, 2011, Illinois state Governor Pat Quinn signed SB1716 into law, establishing civil unions for same-sex and opposite-sex couples. The new law came into effect on June 1, 2011. The provision allowing opposite-sex couples to establish a civil union effectively doubles as a tool for widowed seniors to keep survivor's benefits from a marriage while gaining marital rights at the state level with another partner.

==== Maine ====
Maine legalized domestic partnership for same-sex and opposite-sex couples in 2004. Maine's domestic partnership registry only provides limited rights, most of which are aimed at protecting couples' security in emergency situations.

==== New Hampshire ====
On April 26, 2007, the New Hampshire General Court (state legislature) passed a civil union bill, and Governor John Lynch signed the bill into law on May 31, 2007. At the time, New Hampshire was "... the first state to embrace same-sex unions without a court order or the threat of one". The New Hampshire civil union legislation became effective on January 1, 2008. The law was replaced by the same-sex marriage law on January 1, 2010.

==== New Jersey ====
On October 25, 2006, the Supreme Court of New Jersey gave New Jersey lawmakers 180 days to rewrite the state's marriage laws, either including same-sex couples or creating a new system of civil unions for them. On December 14 the Legislature passed a bill establishing civil unions in New Jersey, which was signed into law by Governor Jon Corzine on December 21, 2006. The first civil unions took place on February 19, 2007. There are differences between civil unions and domestic partnerships. In 2004, the state of New Jersey enacted a domestic partnership law, the Domestic Partnership Act, offering certain limited rights and benefits to same-sex and different-sex couples. In 2006, however, after the state Supreme Court's ruling in Lewis vs. Harris that same-sex couples must be extended all the rights and benefits of marriage, the Legislature passed a civil unions law, the Civil Union Act, effective in 2007, which was an attempt to satisfy the court's ruling.

==== Nevada ====
On May 31, 2009, the Nevada legislature overrode Governor Jim Gibbons' veto of a domestic partnership bill. The bill allows registered domestic partners, whether they are a same-sex or opposite-sex couple, to have most of the state level rights and responsibilities afforded to married couples. It does not require any other entity to provide rights or benefits afforded to married individuals. This has left the partnership bill ineffective compared to those of other states. The law took effect on 1 October 2009.

==== Oregon ====
Since 4 February 2008, Oregon offers domestic partnerships which grant nearly all of the state-recognized rights of marriage to same-sex couples.

==== Rhode Island ====
Civil unions were permitted in Rhode Island since July 1, 2011 until July 1, 2013.

==== Vermont ====
The civil unions law that was passed in the Vermont General Assembly in 2000 was a response to the Vermont Supreme Court ruling in Baker v. Vermont, requiring that the state grant same-sex couples the same rights and privileges accorded to married couples under the law. A Vermont civil union is nearly identical to a legal marriage, as far as the rights and responsibilities for which state law, not federal law, is responsible are concerned. It grants partners next-of-kin rights and other protections that heterosexual married couples also receive. Despite the "full faith and credit" clause of the United States Constitution, civil unions are generally not recognized outside Vermont in the absence of specific legislation. Opponents of the law have supported the Defense of Marriage Act and the proposed Federal Marriage Amendment in order to prevent obligatory recognition of same-sex couples in other jurisdictions. This means that many of the advantages of marriage, which fall in the federal jurisdiction (over 1,100 federal laws, such as joint federal income tax returns, visas and work permits for the foreign partner of a U.S. citizen, etc.), are not extended to the partners of a Vermont civil union. Regarding voluntary recognition of the civil union in other jurisdictions, New York City's Domestic Partnership Law, passed in 2002, recognizes civil unions formalized in other jurisdictions. Germany's international civil law (EGBGB) also accords to Vermont civil unions the same benefits and responsibilities that apply in Vermont, as long as they do not exceed the standard accorded by German law to a German civil union. The law was replaced by the same-sex marriage law on September 1, 2009.

==== Washington ====
Washington offers domestic partnerships which grant nearly all of the state-recognized rights of marriage to same-sex couples. Washington is the first state to have passed a same-sex civil union bill by a popular vote. Washington legalized same-sex marriage early in 2012, which provided that a couple in a civil union would have two years to convert their civil union to a marriage. The law was upheld by popular referendum in November 2012.

=== Uruguay ===
Civil unions in Uruguay were allowed nationwide from January 2008.

== National debates ==
- Hong Kong
- Peru
- Philippines
- Poland
- Romania

== International standards ==
Only two countries (Spain and Portugal) signed onto the Convention on the Recognition of Registered Partnerships, a draft multilateral agreement on the status of civil unmarried partnerships on 5 September 2007. The document is inclusive of rights for both same and opposite sex partnerships.

== See also ==
- Civil marriage
- Cohabitation agreement
- Common-law marriage
- Convention on the Recognition of Registered Partnerships
- Domestic partnership
- Free union
- LGBT rights
- Marriage privatization
- Nyumba ntobhu
