= Same-sex marriage in New Jersey =

Same-sex marriage has been legally recognized in New Jersey since October 21, 2013, the effective date of a trial court ruling invalidating the state's restriction of marriage to persons of different sexes. In September 2013, Mary C. Jacobson, Assignment Judge of the Mercer Vicinage of the Superior Court, ruled that as a result of the U.S. Supreme Court's June 2013 decision in United States v. Windsor, the Constitution of New Jersey requires the state to recognize same-sex marriages. The Windsor decision held that the federal government was required to provide the same benefits to same-sex couples who were married under state law as to other married couples. Therefore, the state court reasoned in Garden State Equality v. Dow that, because same-sex couples in New Jersey were limited to civil unions, which are not recognized as marriages under federal law, the state must permit civil marriage for same-sex couples. This ruling, in turn, relied on the 2006 decision of the New Jersey Supreme Court in Lewis v. Harris that the state was constitutionally required to afford the rights and benefits of marriage to same-sex couples. The Supreme Court had ordered the New Jersey Legislature to correct the constitutional violation, by permitting either same-sex marriage or civil unions with all the rights and benefits of marriage, within 180 days. In response, it passed a bill to legalize civil unions on December 21, 2006, which became effective on February 19, 2007.

Following the trial court decision in Garden State Equality v. Dow, the Christie Administration asked the New Jersey Supreme Court to grant a stay of the decision pending appeal. On October 18, 2013, the Supreme Court unanimously denied the request for a stay. Three days later, on the day the trial court ruling went into effect and local officials had begun issuing marriage licenses to same-sex couples, and some wedding ceremonies had been performed, Governor Christie withdrew the state's appeal. This action removed the last potential impediment to same-sex marriages in the state. New Jersey was the fourteenth U.S. state to legalize same-sex marriage.

In 2012, the New Jersey Legislature passed a bill to legalize same-sex marriage, but it was vetoed by Governor Chris Christie. In January 2022, Governor Phil Murphy signed into law legislation to codify same-sex marriage into New Jersey statutes.

== Domestic partnerships ==
In 2004, New Jersey implemented a domestic partnership scheme. It was one of the first U.S. states to do so, after California. In 2006, advocates of same-sex unions sued to transcend domestic partnership in the case of Lewis v. Harris. The judges struck down the domestic partnership arrangement and split 4–3 to allow the New Jersey Legislature to pass civil unions instead of allowing same-sex marriage. In December 2006, the New Jersey Legislature passed a bill providing for civil unions and recognizing other states' civil unions.

The New Jersey Legislature enacted the Domestic Partnership Act on January 12, 2004, which came into effect on July 10, 2004. The law made domestic partnerships available to all same-sex couples, as well as to different-sex couples aged 62 and older. The domestic partnership statute provides "limited health care, inheritance, property rights and other rights and obligations" but "[does] not approach the broad array of rights and obligations afforded to married couples." For example, as Lambda Legal stated, the law "required health and pension benefits [only] for state employees—it was voluntary for other employers—and did not require family leave to care for an ill partner." The domestic partnership statute remains in place even though New Jersey subsequently enacted a civil union statute. Couples in an existing domestic partnership are not required to enter a civil union. However, new domestic partnerships are available only to couples in which both partners are 62 and over, whether same-sex or different-sex.

== Civil unions ==
=== Lewis v. Harris ===
On October 25, 2006, the Supreme Court of New Jersey unanimously ruled in Lewis v. Harris that the "unequal dispensation of rights and benefits to committed same-sex partners can no longer be tolerated under our State Constitution." With the Lewis decision, same-sex couples were granted the same rights, benefits and responsibilities as heterosexual couples with respect to their relationships. While the decision was widely reported as a 4–3 split, the differences between the justices were on whether only the provision of civil marriage rights to same-sex couples would resolve the constitutional defect, or whether another change in statute would pass constitutional scrutiny. The court avoided the question of what to call the legal status, leaving that to, as the majority stated, the "crucible of the democratic process".

The dissent, led by Chief Justice Deborah T. Poritz, chastised the junior members of the court who said that anything other than marriage would provide equal rights: "What we name things matters, language matters... Labels set people apart surely as physical separation on a bus or in school facilities... By excluding same-sex couples from civil marriage, the State declares that it is legitimate to differentiate between their commitments and the commitments of heterosexual couples. Ultimately the message is that what same-sex couples have is not as important or as significant as real marriage, that such lesser relationships cannot have the name of marriage." The court gave the New Jersey Legislature six months to enact legislation providing for civil unions.

=== Civil Union Act ===
On December 14, 2006, the New Jersey Legislature passed a bill providing for civil unions, which was signed into law by Governor Jon Corzine on December 21, 2006. The Civil Union Act came into effect on February 19, 2007.

Same-sex couples who enter into a civil union are provided almost all of the rights granted to married couples under New Jersey state law. However, under the provisions of the federal Defense of Marriage Act (DOMA), same-sex couples in civil unions and domestic partnerships did not have any right or entitlement to the 1,138 rights that a married couple has under federal law. Section 3 of DOMA, which prohibited the federal recognition of same-sex marriages, was struck down by the Supreme Court in 2013 in United States v. Windsor. According to the civil union law, when a same-sex couple enters into a civil union, their domestic partnership is automatically terminated by the civil union. However, those couples who remain in domestic partnerships and elect to not enter into a civil union will be allowed to remain as domestic partners. New domestic partnerships can still be formed if both partners are 62 years of age or older.

The law provided for the creation of a Civil Unions Review Commission that would evaluate the law's effectiveness and any problems resulting therefrom, and would report every six months for three years following enactment to assess the impact of the law. The first meeting of the Civil Unions Review Commission took place on June 18, 2007. The Commission elected a chair, Frank Vespa-Papaleo, the Director of the New Jersey Division of Civil Rights, and the Commission planned meeting monthly as well as conducting periodic public meetings.

=== Civil unions in practice ===
The New Jersey State Bar Association (NJSBA) took a formal position against the adoption of the Civil Unions Act, citing inherent and obvious problems and confusion the law would have for citizens and legal representation. In addition, the NJSBA formally endorsed the marriage bill proposed by openly gay Assemblyman Reed Gusciora, saying that only same-sex marriage would meet the standard mandated by the Lewis decision.

A United Parcel Service (UPS) spokesman claimed that language in its collective bargaining agreement with the International Brotherhood of Teamsters union prevented it from extending benefits to same-sex partners. On July 20, 2007, Governor Jon Corzine sent a letter to UPS officials on behalf of a UPS driver and her partner, asking the company to comply with New Jersey law and extend spousal benefits such as health insurance to civil union partners. On July 30, a UPS spokesman said: "We have received clear guidance that, at least in New Jersey, the state truly views civil union partners as married. We've heard that loud and clear from state officials and we're happy to make this change." The company also noted that it already offers equal benefits to married same-sex couples in Massachusetts and would review its policies in Connecticut and Vermont.

Prior to the legalization of same-sex marriage in New Jersey, all same-sex relationships (including marriages) contracted out of state were recognized as having the same legal force as New Jersey civil unions, where they "provide substantially all the rights and benefits of marriage", or as equivalent and having the same legal force as New Jersey domestic partnerships, where they "provide some but not all of the rights and obligations of marriage".

=== Statistics ===
During the first 90 days after the law went into effect, 852 same-sex couples entered into civil unions, according to the New Jersey Department of Health and Senior Services. During the same period, the LGBT civil rights organization, Garden State Equality, reported that it had received complaints from 102 couples denied benefits by employers or insurers. On May 22, 2007, The Star-Ledger reported that the New Jersey Division on Civil Rights had received at least 270 inquiries from couples in civil unions denied benefits by employers or insurers. As of June 18, 2007, only two complaints had been filed with the New Jersey Division of Civil Rights, it was reported at the first meeting of the Civil Unions Review Commission.

According to Garden State Equality, by the end of July 2007, 211 of the 1,358 couples who had entered New Jersey civil unions since February 19 had "reported to Garden State Equality that their employers refused to recognize their civil unions." Among the companies flouting state law were shipping companies UPS, FedEx, and DHL, as well as a number of Fortune 500 companies.

By February 2008, 2,329 couples had entered into civil unions in the state.

== Same-sex marriage ==
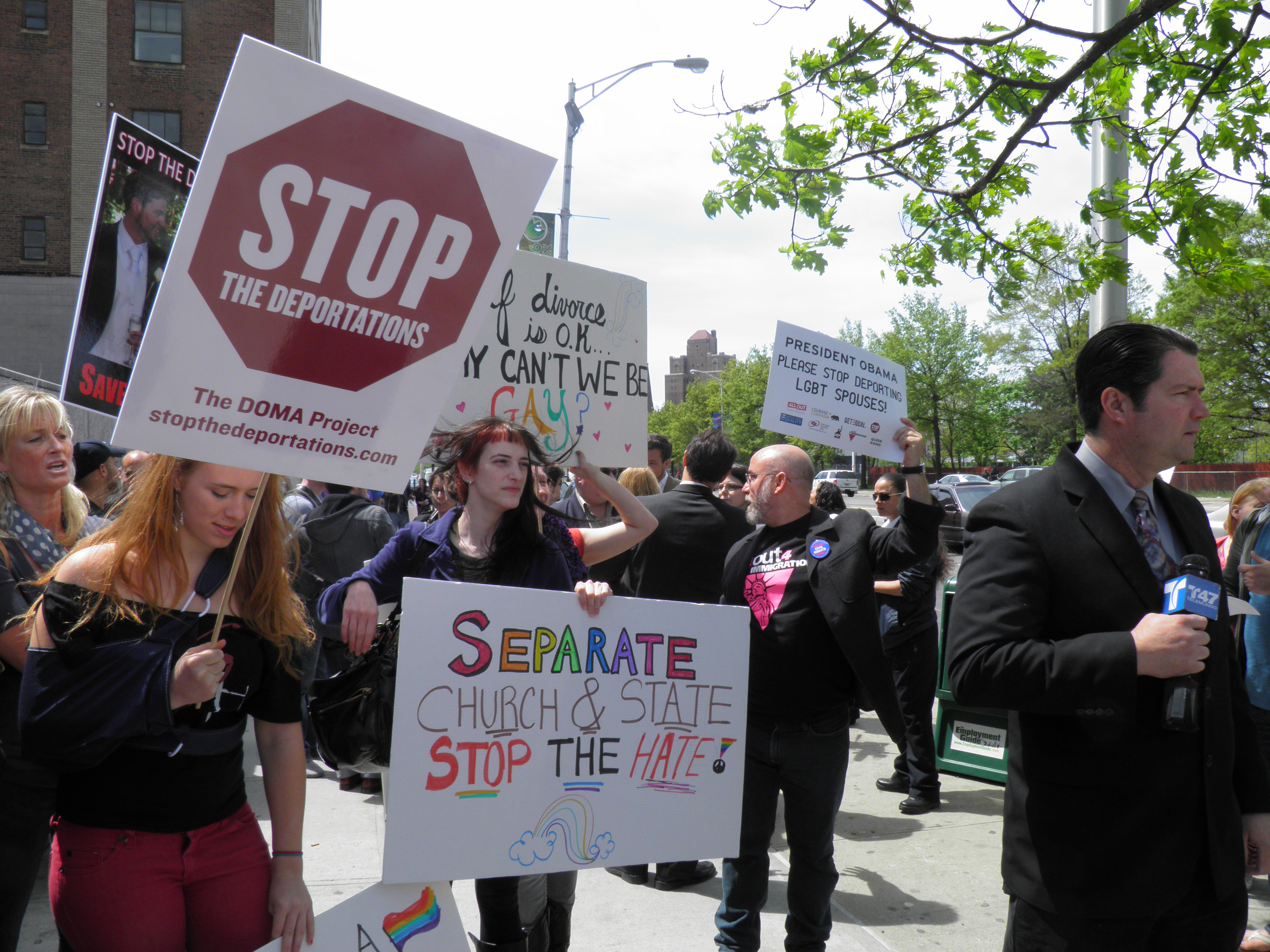
2011 protest in Newark by Garden State Equality in support of same-sex marriage and against the deportation of LGBT spouses

=== Background ===
Beginning on March 5, 2004, Kiki Tomek, the Deputy City Clerk of Asbury Park, processed marriage licenses for same-sex couples for several days. Deputy Mayor James Bruno married one couple on March 8, but then heeded a warning from the New Jersey Attorney General, Peter C. Harvey, to stop issuing such licenses.

A legislative commission was formed to review whether civil unions brought equality to same-sex couples. It determined that civil unions failed to provide equal treatment. On December 10, 2008, the Commission released its unanimous finding that marriage laws should be made gender-neutral to ensure equal treatment of same-sex couples. Governor Corzine had indicated that he would sign a bill to allow same-sex marriage. In late 2009, lame duck Governor Corzine stated that he would sign a bill legalizing same-sex marriage if it came to his desk before he left office, while his newly elected Republican successor Chris Christie said that he would promote a constitutional amendment to ban same-sex marriage. However, the political situation at the time made such an amendment unlikely, and Governor Christie later supported a public vote on same-sex marriage; while he was personally opposed to it, he promised not to revisit the same-sex marriage issue if it was legalized by popular vote.

On July 26, 2010, the New Jersey Supreme Court declined a request on the part of the plaintiffs in Lewis v. Harris that it review whether the State Legislature had complied with the court's order in that case. It said it wanted the challenge to begin in a lower court where a trial record could be developed.

=== Legislation ===
On December 7, 2009, the New Jersey Senate Judiciary Committee approved a same-sex marriage bill by a vote of 7 to 6, after seven hours of testimony and debate. It was amended in committee to clarify that clergy would not be required to perform weddings for same-sex couples. On January 7, 2010, the New Jersey Senate defeated the measure in a 20–14 vote.

On February 13, 2012, the Senate passed a bill legalizing same-sex marriage by a vote of 24 to 16, and on February 16, the Assembly passed it by a vote of 42 to 33, with three Republicans and one Democrat not voting, and one Democratic seat temporarily vacant. In neither house was the bill passed by a veto-proof majority. Governor Christie vetoed the bill the next day and called for a constitutional amendment for same-sex marriage to be presented to voters as a ballot referendum. On February 21, 2013, Democratic leaders announced plans to hold a vote to override Christie's veto. The legislation needed three additional votes in the Senate and 12 in the House. The State Legislature had until January 2014 to override the veto. Democratic legislative leaders discussed the matter with Christie in July. Senate President Stephen Sweeney said Christie was intimidating some Republicans who supported same-sex marriage, and State Senator Barbara Buono, the Democratic candidate for governor, called Christie the "one man in New Jersey ... that stands in the way of marriage equality". Christie said in response: "If you want to change the core of a 2,000-year-old institution, the way to do that is to put it in front of the voters in the state of New Jersey and let them vote". In September 2013, legislators in favor of the bill were organizing an attempt at the veto override, and several legislators who had not voted on the bill or had voted against committed to supporting it. However, the veto was not overriden by the January 2014 deadline.

=== Garden State Equality v. Dow ===
On June 29, 2011, Lambda Legal filed suit in the Law Division of Superior Court in Mercer County on behalf of Garden State Equality, seven same-sex couples, and several of their children, arguing that New Jersey's civil unions did not provide the same rights as marriage as required by the court's decision in Lewis. On September 27, 2013, New Jersey Superior Court Judge Mary Jacobson ruled that the state must allow same-sex couples to marry in accordance with the U.S. Supreme Court's decision in United States v. Windsor. Jacobson ruled that as of October 21, 2013, the state "shall permit" same-sex couples to marry.

The Christie Administration appealed Jacobson's ruling and also requested a stay of its execution. The Supreme Court of New Jersey accepted the appeal on October 11 and scheduled oral arguments for January 6–7, 2014. On October 18, 2013, the Supreme Court rendered a provisional, unanimous (7–0 vote) order denying the stay, thereby provisionally authorizing same-sex marriage in the state pending its decision on the state's appeal of Judge Jacobson's ruling. In the Supreme Court's decision, Chief Justice Stuart Rabner wrote that "the state has advanced a number of arguments, but none of them overcome this reality: Same-sex couples who cannot marry are not treated equally under the law today". The court held that it could "find no public interest in depriving a group of New Jersey residents of their constitutional right to equal protection while the appeals process unfolds." Weddings were performed just after midnight on October 21, 2013, and Governor Christie dropped his administration's appeal of the lower court ruling that morning. Among the first couples to marry were Joseph Panessidi and Orville Bell in Newark shortly after midnight on October 21. Their marriage was officiated by Mayor Cory Booker, who also officiated at six other same-sex marriages that day.

=== Developments after legalization ===
In December 2021, the New Jersey Legislature passed legislation to codify same-sex marriage into state statues. The bill was passed 35–4 in the Senate, and 53–10 in the Assembly. It was signed into law by Governor Phil Murphy on January 10, 2022. New Jersey statutes were amended to read:

Laws concerning marriage and civil union shall be read with gender neutral intent. [R.S. 37:1-1(c)]

December 20, 2021 vote in the New Jersey Senate
Political affiliation	Voted for	Voted against	Abstained/Not present
Democratic Party	26: Dawn Addiego; James Beach; Richard Codey; Nilsa Cruz-Perez; Joseph Cryan; Sandra Bolden Cunningham; Patrick J. Diegnan; Nia Gill; Vin Gopal; Linda R. Greenstein; Joseph Lagana; Fred H. Madden; Vincent J. Polistina; Nellie Pou; Ronald Rice; Teresa Ruiz; Nicholas Sacco; Paul Sarlo; Nicholas Scutari; Troy Singleton; Bob Smith; Brian P. Stack; Stephen Sweeney; Shirley Turner; Joe F. Vitale; Loretta Weinberg	-	-
Republican Party	9: Kip Bateman; Anthony M. Bucco; Kristin Corrado; Thomas Kean Jr.; Declan O'Scanlon; Joseph Pennacchio; Holly Schepisi; Mike Testa; Samuel D. Thompson	5: Christopher J. Connors; Michael J. Doherty; Steve Oroho; Robert Singer	1: James W. Holzapfel
Total	35	4	1

December 20, 2021 vote in the New Jersey General Assembly
Political affiliation	Voted for	Voted against	Abstained/Not present
Democratic Party	44: John Armato; Daniel R. Benson; John J. Burzichelli; Linda S. Carter; Nicholas Chiaravalloti; Herb Conaway; Craig Coughlin; Joseph Danielsen; Wayne DeAngelo; Joann Downey; Joseph V. Egan; Roy Freiman; Louis Greenwald; Jamel Holley; Eric Houghtaling; Valerie Huttle; Mila Jasey; Angelica M. Jimenez; Gordon M. Johnson; Robert Karabinchak; James J. Kennedy; Pamela Rosen Lampitt; Yvonne Lopez; John F. McKeon; Angela V. McKnight; Pedro Mejia; Bill Moen; Paul D. Moriarty; Gabriela Mosquera; Raj Mukherji; Carol A. Murphy; Eliana Pintor Marin; Annette Quijano; Verlina Reynolds-Jackson; William Spearman; Shanique Speight; Sterley Stanley; Shavonda E. Sumter; Lisa Swain; Adam Taliaferro; Britnee Timberlake; Cleopatra Tucker; Chris Tully; Anthony Verrelli	-	8: Clinton Calabrese; Ralph R. Caputo; Annette Chaparro; Thomas P. Giblin; Vince Mazzeo; Gary Schaer; Benjie E. Wimberly; Andrew Zwicker
Republican Party	9: Brian Bergen; DeAnne DeFuccio; Christopher DePhillips; Aura K. Dunn; Antwan McClellan; Ryan Peters; Kevin J. Rooney; Erik K. Simonsen; Jean Stanfield	10: Robert Auth; John Catalano; Robert D. Clifton; Ronald S. Dancer; Serena DiMaso; Erik Peterson; Gerard Scharfenberger; Parker Space; Ned Thomson; Jay Webber	9: Jon Bramnick; BettyLou DeCroce; John DiMaio; DiAnne Gove; Sean T. Kean; Gregory P. McGuckin; Nancy Munoz; Brian E. Rumpf; Hal Wirths
Total	53	10	17

In July 2022, Garden State Equality, the Hudson Pride Connections Center and the Latino Action Network reported that the municipal websites of Estell Manor, Fairview, Hanover Township, Linden, New Hanover Township, and South Toms River contained language stating that only opposite-sex couples may apply for marriage licenses. Attorney General Matt Platkin announced in October 2022 that the Division on Civil Rights had launched an enforcement initiative to ensure that municipal governments not discriminate against same-sex couples in their webpages on vital records and marriage application instructions. Platkin said, "Marriage equality is the law here in New Jersey. But when municipalities use language indicating that individuals cannot obtain a marriage license based on their sexual orientation or gender identity, they violate that basic promise." The municipalities modified their webpages following the publication of the report.

=== Economic impact ===
A 2006 study from the University of California, Los Angeles estimated the potential economic impact of same-sex marriage on the New Jersey economy and concluded that the gain would be substantial. If New Jersey were to give same-sex couples the right to marry, that is marriage itself and not civil unions, the state would experience a surge in spending on weddings by same-sex couples who currently live in New Jersey, as well as an increase in wedding and tourist spending by same-sex couples from other states. The analysis outlined in detail in the report predicted that sales by New Jersey's wedding and tourism-related businesses would rise by $102.5 million in each of the first three years when marriage for same-sex couples is legal. As a result, the state's gross receipt tax revenues would rise by $7.2 million per year, and 1,400 new jobs would be created in relevant industries.

=== Demographics and marriage statistics ===
Data from the 2000 U.S. census showed that 16,604 same-sex couples were living in New Jersey. By 2005, this had increased to 20,677 couples, likely attributed to same-sex couples' growing willingness to disclose their partnerships on government surveys. Same-sex couples lived in all counties of the state and constituted 0.9% of coupled households and 0.5% of all households in the state. Most couples lived in Essex, Hudson, Bergen and Middlesex counties. Same-sex partners in New Jersey were on average younger than opposite-sex partners, and more likely to be employed. However, the average and median household incomes of same-sex couples were lower than different-sex couples, and same-sex couples were also far less likely to own a home than opposite-sex partners. 21% of same-sex couples in New Jersey were raising children under the age of 18, with an estimated 8,337 children living in households headed by same-sex couples in 2005.

The 2020 U.S. census showed that there were 17,342 married same-sex couple households (8,197 male couples and 9,145 female couples) and 10,701 unmarried same-sex couple households in New Jersey.

== Public opinion ==
Public opinion for same-sex marriage in New Jersey
Poll source	Dates administered	Sample size	Margin of error	Support	Opposition	Do not know / refused
Public Religion Research Institute	March 9 – December 7, 2023	545 adults	± 0.82%^{1}	76%	22%	2%
Public Religion Research Institute	March 11 – December 14, 2022	?	?	76%	21%	3%
Public Religion Research Institute	March 8 – November 9, 2021	?	?	76%	21%	3%
Public Religion Research Institute	January 7 – December 20, 2020	1,334 adults	?	66%	32%	2%
Public Religion Research Institute	April 5 – December 23, 2017	1,774 adults	?	68%	23%	9%
Public Religion Research Institute	May 18, 2016 – January 10, 2017	2,779 adults	?	64%	26%	10%
Public Religion Research Institute	April 29, 2015 – January 7, 2016	2,184 adults	?	66%	26%	8%
Rutgers University/Eagleton Institute of Politics	February 22–28, 2014	729 registered voters	± 3.8%	64%	28%	6%
Quinnipiac University	July 2–7, 2013	1,068 voters	± 3.0%	60%	31%	9%
Rutgers University/Eagleton Institute of Politics	June 3–9, 2013	763 registered voters	± 3.6%	59%	30%	11%
Quinnipiac University	March 19–24, 2013	1,129 registered voters	± 2.9%	64%	30%	6%
Public Policy Polling	November 26–28, 2012	600 voters	± 4.0%	53%	36%	11%
Quinnipiac University	February 21–27, 2012	1,396 registered voters	± 2.6%	57%	37%	6%
Rutgers University/Eagleton Institute of Politics	February 9–11, 2012	914 adults	± 3.3%	54%	35%	11%
Quinnipiac University	January 10–16, 2012	1,460 registered voters	± 2.6%	52%	42%	6%
Rutgers University/Eagleton Institute of Politics	October 6–9, 2011	903 adults	± 4.7%	52%	39%	9%
Rutgers University/Eagleton Institute of Politics	August 9–15, 2011	615 registered voters	± 3.9%	52%	32%	16%
Public Policy Polling	July 15–18, 2011	480 voters	± 4.5%	47%	42%	11%
Quinnipiac University	November 17–22, 2009	1,615 voters	± 2.4%	46%	49%	5%
Rutgers University/Eagleton Institute of Politics	November 6–10, 2009	903 adults	± 3.3%	50%	42%	8%
Quinnipiac University	April 2009	2,222 registered voters	± 2.1%	49%	43%	8%
Zogby International	August 7–11, 2008	803 likely voters	± 3.5%	50%	42%	8%
Zogby International	August 8–10, 2007	803 voters	± 3.5%	48%	45%	7%
Rasmussen Reports	July 2006	500 likely voters	?	42%	54%	4%
Rutgers University/Eagleton Institute of Politics	June 14–19, 2006	699 registered voters	± 3.7%	49%	44%	7%
Zogby International	April 12–14, 2005	804 voters	± 3.5%	55%	40%	5%
Zogby International	July 15–19, 2003	803 voters	± 3.6%	55%	41%	4%

Notes:

- ^{1} The margin of error for the national survey was ± 0.82 percentage points at the 95% level of confidence, including the design effect for the survey of 1.56.

The questions asked in each opinion poll varied. For example, the November 2009 Rutgers University/Eagleton Institute of Politics poll asked voters if they would accept a decision by the New Jersey Legislature to legalize same-sex marriage, while the 2006 Rasmussen Reports survey asked voters whether they personally define marriage as a union of a man and a woman or a union of two people. A Zogby International poll conducted in April 2005 asked about same-sex couples married outside of the state: 57.5% felt the marriages should be recognized, while 37.2% thought the state should not recognize them, and 5.3% were not sure. A 2006 Rutgers University/Eagleton Institute of Politics survey showed that New Jersey voters supported civil unions, with 66% in favor and 29% opposed.

A July 2011 Public Policy Polling survey found that 81% of New Jersey voters supported the legal recognition of same-sex couples, with 41% supporting same-sex marriage and 40% supporting civil unions, while 17% opposed all legal recognition and 2% were not sure.

New Jersey trends mirrors national trends, in that women, young people, Latinos, people with a college education, and people who know gay men and lesbians are more supportive of same-sex marriage than men, the elderly, African Americans, Asian Americans, people without a college education, and those who do not know any gay men or lesbians. However, same-sex marriage was not seen as an "important issue" by the latter groups, and the Eagleton Institute of Politics found that they were not likely to be source of opposition to a same-sex marriage bill if it passed. A 2012 Quinnipiac University poll found that a majority of Democrats and Independents supported same-sex marriage, while a majority of Republicans were opposed.

== See also ==
- LGBT rights in New Jersey
- Same-sex marriage in the United States
