= Garden State Equality =

LGBTQ advocacy organization in New Jersey

- U.S. State of New Jersey
- Founded: 2004
- Location(s): Asbury Park and Montclair, New Jersey
- Region served: New Jersey
- Website: gardenstateequality.org

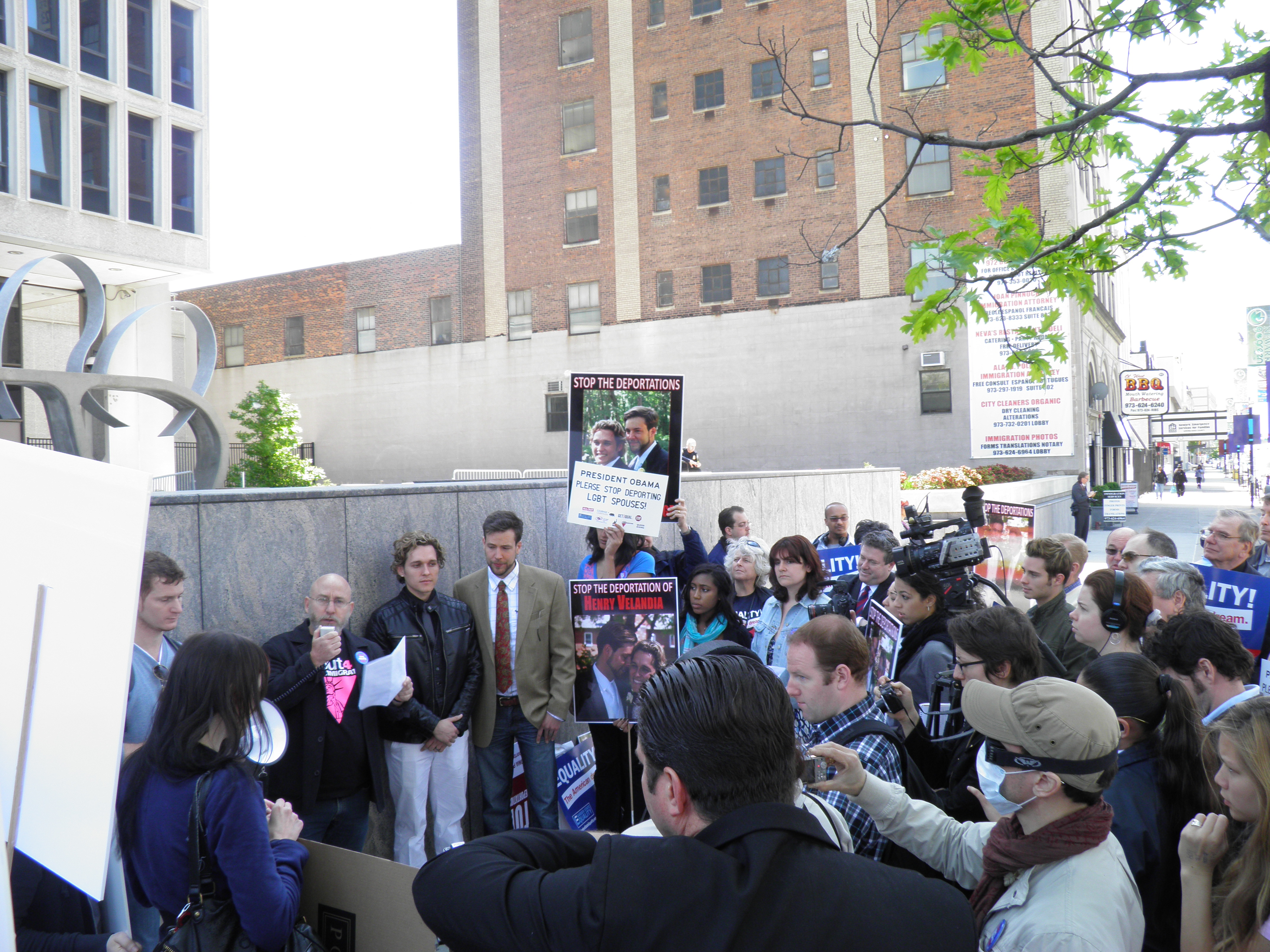
Crowd at Garden State Equality protest in May 2011

Garden State Equality is a statewide advocacy and education organization in the U.S. state of New Jersey that advocates for lesbian, gay, bisexual, and transgender (LGBTQ) rights, including same-sex marriage.

== History ==
Garden State Equality was founded in 2004 by Steven Goldstein; he left the organization in 2013 and Troy Stevenson was promoted to take his role.

=== Garden State Equality v. Paula Dow ===
In 2011, Lambda Legal filed a lawsuit on behalf of Garden State Equality and 6 same-sex families against New Jersey, arguing that the state's civil union system failed to provide those same benefits and violated New Jersey's guarantee of equal protection. On September 27, 2013, Judge Mary Jacobson ruled that same-sex marriage should be legal and ordered the state to begin allowing same-sex marriages on October 21, 2013. The state quickly appealed the decision and asked for a stay to delay the implementation of the court order. On October 18, 2013, the Supreme Court of New Jersey unanimously affirmed Judge Jacobson's denial of the stay and ruled that state should begin issuing marriage licenses to same-sex couples as ordered. Hours after the first marriages were officiated on October 21, 2013, the state dropped its legal challenge and New Jersey became the 14th state with the freedom to marry for all couples, barring age restrictions.

== Programs ==
Garden State Equality programming focuses on public policy advocacy and grassroots organizing.

=== Grassroots programs ===
The organization's grassroots programs include volunteer work, training, town meetings, and action nights, where participants can provide input on or participate In the organization's work.

Garden State Equality stresses the importance of volunteer work for the organization. There are many difference branches of service available within the organization, such as a campaign for the homeless and those in poverty, which helps to gather more information about these minority groups and take action to improve their living standards. This specific campaign not only aids the LGBT community but also often caters to the impoverished, homeless, and incarcerated.

An anti-bullying hotline collects reports from parents, students and others about incidents of bullying against students. The organization visits schools to conduct training for administrators, teachers and other staff on New Jersey's anti-bullying law, and how to comply with it. The organization also conducts a different age-appropriate anti-bullying training for students.

At the annual Equality Walk, volunteers get sponsored by friends to do a walk each October. It started in Asbury Park, taking place on a Sunday, but now they host 4 separate events across New Jersey.

Garden State Equality has held numerous town meetings on LGBT issues, such as same-sex marriage, across the state. The organization also holds telephone town meetings with public officials on conference calls with as many as 200 people. The organization has also held lobby days where volunteers meet with legislators and their staff on LGBT issues.

In an effort to include more teens in their activism, they introduced a week-long youth leadership initiative known as Changemakers in 2023, along with a year-round Youth Advisory Board.

=== Former programs ===
Garden State Equality's former grassroots programs include Activist Institutes that trained volunteers in organizing skills, and the "Equality Express", a motor home that traveled to large events in New Jersey to educate people on LGBT issues. The organization also held "Helping You Personally" seminars, where experts in legal and finance spoke on issues of interest to LGBT people in New Jersey.

Prior to legal recognition of same-sex marriages in New Jersey, the organization volunteered to collect letters and postcards in support of marriage equality. The organization developed thirteen caucuses to help to diversify New Jersey's LGBT rights movement. Each caucus serves a different demographic community such as African-Americans, clergy, labor, women, and youth.

As a part of legislative dinners, Assembly Members and State Senators met Garden State Equality members at the members' homes. Many New Jersey legislators have attended at least one town meeting or legislative dinner.

== Legends Dinner ==
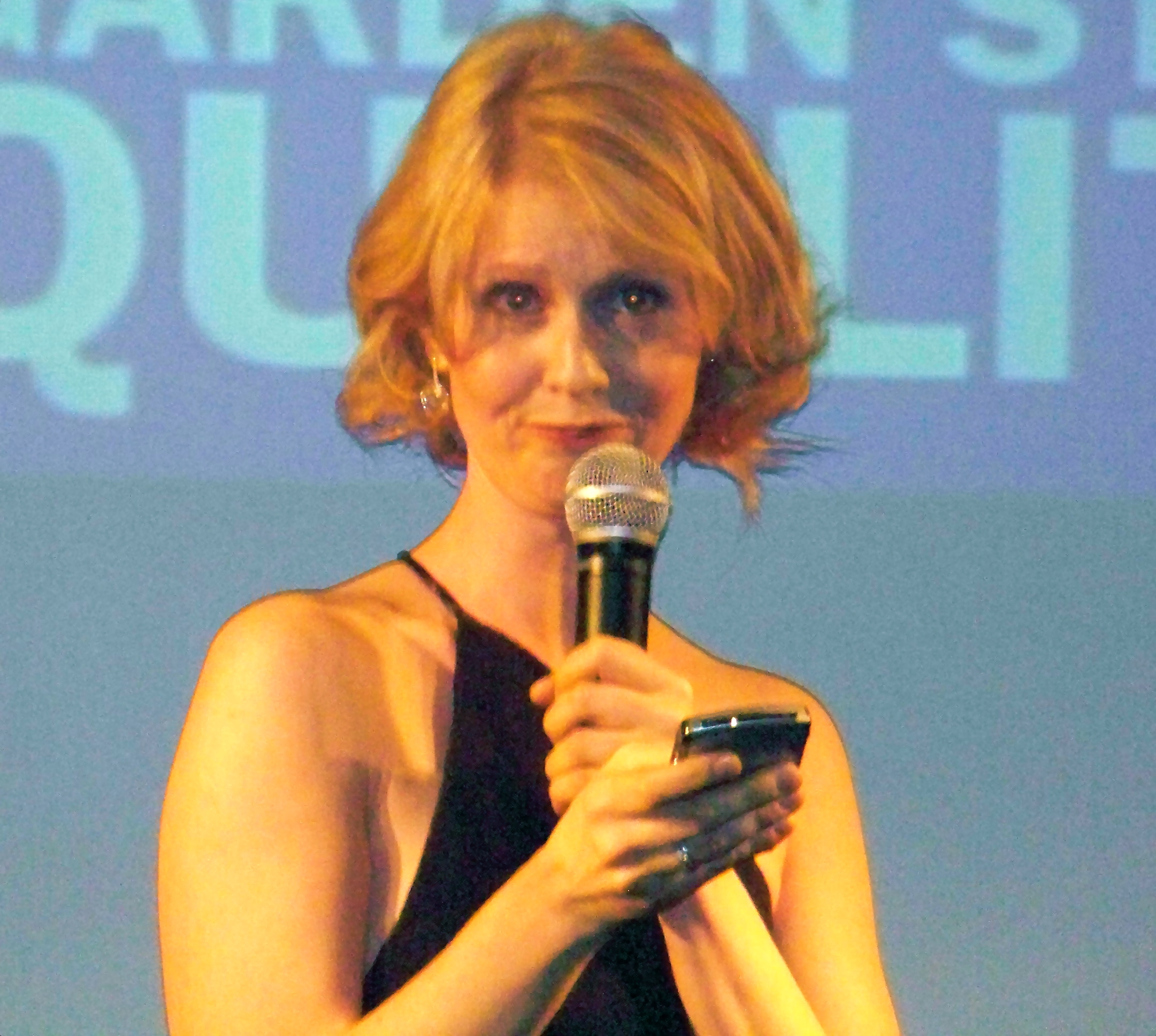
Cynthia Nixon at the 2008 Legends Dinner in Maplewood, New Jersey

Garden State Equality's Legends Dinner is the organization's annual gala attended by 700 to 1,000 guests. Speakers and entertainers have included Governor Mario Cuomo, Senator Frank Lautenberg, Fran Drescher, Cynthia Nixon, Judy Gold, Anthony Rapp, and Jennifer Holliday.

== See also ==
- LGBT rights in New Jersey
- Same-sex marriage in New Jersey
- List of LGBT rights organizations
- History of gay and lesbian life in Asbury Park
- Gay community of Plainfield, NJ
- LGBT history in Atlantic City
- Jersey Pride (the state's largest annual gay pride parade, held in Asbury Park)
