= Hemingway (disambiguation) =

Ernest Hemingway (1899–1961) was an American writer and journalist.

Hemingway may also refer to:

- Hemingway (surname), a surname and list of people with that name
- Hemingway (comics), a Marvel Comics character
- Hemingway, South Carolina
- 3656 Hemingway, an asteroid
- Hemingway: On the Edge, a play by Ed Metzger and Laya Gelff-Metzger
- "Hemingway", a song by Bløf
- Hemingway, a 1988 television mini-series starring Stacy Keach
- Hemingway, a bulldog owned by Pete Wentz featured in the video "The Take Over, the Breaks Over"
- Hemingway (crater), a crater on Mercury
- Hemingway (film), a 2021 PBS documentary starring Jeff Daniels
- Hemingway's, a Vermont restaurant

== See also ==
- Hemingway Foundation/PEN Award, literary award
- Ernest Hemingway Cottage, on Walloon Lake, Michigan
- Ernest Hemingway House, Key West, Florida
- Hemingway Corner, Canadian-American folk pop group of the 1960s
- Hemingway cat, slang term for polydactyl cats
- Hemingway Daiquiri or Hemingway Special, a variety of Daiquiri
- Hemenway (disambiguation)
