= Hemenway =

Hemenway is a surname. Notable people with the surname include:

- Abby Maria Hemenway (1828-1890), a historian of Vermont
- Augustus Hemenway (1853–1931), philanthropist and public servant in Boston; son of E.A.H. Hemenway and M.T. Hemenway
- David Hemenway, professor of Health Policy at the Harvard School of Public Health
- Edward Augustus Holyoke Hemenway, merchant; husband of M.T. Hemenway
- Harriet Hemenway (1858–1960) was a Boston socialite who founded the Massachusetts Audubon; wife of August Hemenway
- James Alexander Hemenway (1860–1923), United States Representative
- John Francis Hemenway, founder of the Smith & Hemenway tool company
- Mary Tileston Hemenway, philanthropist and wife of E.A.H. Hemenway
- Robert Emery Hemenway, 16th chancellor of the University of Kansas

== See also ==
- Silas Hemenway Jennison
- Hemenway Furniture Co. Building
- Hemenway, a Japanese rock band.
- Hemenway Park, a park in Boulder City, Nevada
- Hemingway (disambiguation)
