= Ridge High School =

High school in Somerset County, New Jersey, US

- Front of school

Location
- 268 South Finley Avenue; Bernards Township, Somerset County, New Jersey 07920; United States; 40°41′39″N 74°32′50″W

Information
- Type: Public high school
- Established: September 1961
- School district: Bernards Township School District
- NCES School ID: 340165005124
- Principal: Cheryl Howarth
- Faculty: 130.0 FTEs
- Enrollment: 1,577 (as of 2024–25)
- Student to teacher ratio: 12.1:1
- Colors: Green; White; Black
- Athletics conference: Skyland Conference (general); Big Central Football Conference (football)
- Team name: Red Devils
- Publication: Devil's Quill (literary magazine)
- Newspaper: Devil's Advocate
- Website: ridgehigh.bernardsboe.com/o/rhs

Ridge High School is a four-year comprehensive community public high school serving students in ninth through twelfth grades from Bernards Township in Somerset County, in the U.S. state of New Jersey, operating as the lone secondary school of the Bernards Township School District.

As of the 2024–25 school year, the school had an enrollment of 1,577 students and 130.0 classroom teachers (on an FTE basis), for a student–teacher ratio of 12.1:1. There were 37 students (2.3% of enrollment) eligible for free lunch and none eligible for reduced-cost lunch. As of 2021, the racial breakdown was White (60.9%), Asian (28.3%), Hispanic (6.6%), two or more races (3.4%) and African American (0.8%).

== History ==
=== Early history ===
Students in Bernards Township had attended Bernardsville High School dating back to 1927. When Bernardsville became an independent municipality in 1924, the new board of education was given ownership of the high school and Bernards Township students continued attendance at the school as part of a sending/receiving relationship. There were failed efforts in early 1959 to pass a referendum that would create a regional district for Bernardsville and Bernards Township, along with Bedminster Township, Far Hills and Peapack and Gladstone. By a more than 3-1 margin, voters approved an October 1959 referendum that would cover construction of a standalone high school in Bernards Township that would accommodate up to 670 students and be constructed at a cost of $1.5 million (equivalent to $16.6 million in 2025).

The 60 acres (24 ha) of land on which the high school sits was donated by George Ludlow Lee Sr., who was the owner and chairman of the board of Red Devil, Inc. The school's team nickname, the Red Devils, derived from the company's logo, though the color was changed to green to avoid the red that was used by rival Bernardsville High School.

The school opened with 21 classrooms for 500 students in grades 9-12 in September 1961, though some of the school facilities were not yet completed.

=== Facility history ===
Since the school opened in 1961, the building has undergone multiple expansions as student enrollment and the surrounding town grew. Notable classroom and facilities additions were completed in the 1960s, 1970s, 1980s, 1990s, and 2000s. In December 2019, plans to construct a new two-story wing consisting of classrooms and a kitchen facility prior to adopting a "rotating-drop" schedule were abandoned due to declining enrollment trends.

=== Enrollment history ===
Through the latter half of the 20th century, Ridge High School enrollment increased gradually to 910 students for the 1999-2000 school year. Five years later, enrollment had reached 1,424 students, and in 2015, the school had grown to 1,900 students. Since 2015, grade 9-12 enrollment has declined, with 1,595 students for the 2024-25 school year.

=== Notable incidents ===
Stephen Kovacs was appointed the Ridge High School head boys' fencing coach in November 2019. He was head coach through February 2021. A number of fencers on the school team attended the nearby Kaprica Fencing Academy, which Kovacs owned and where he was head coach. Kovacs was arrested in 2021 by detectives for allegedly sexually assaulting two teenage fencing students multiple times in 2020 and 2021; he died in Somerset County Jail in January 2022.

== Awards, recognition and rankings ==
During the 1986-87 school year, Ridge High School was awarded the Blue Ribbon School Award of Excellence by the United States Department of Education, the highest award an American school can receive. During the 2009-10 school year, Ridge High School was awarded the Blue Ribbon School Award of Excellence for a second time.

In the 2011 "Ranking America's High Schools" issue by The Washington Post, the school was ranked 3rd in New Jersey and 220th nationwide. Ridge High School was ranked 194th, the second-highest in New Jersey, in Newsweek magazine's 2010 rankings of America's Best High Schools. The school was ranked 175th in Newsweek's 2009 ranking of the top 1,500 high schools in the United States and was the third-ranked school in New Jersey, with 3.132 AP tests taken in 2008 per graduating senior and 50% of all graduating seniors passing at least one AP exam; The school was ranked 136th nationwide in 2008. The school was listed in 98th place, the second-highest ranked school in New Jersey in Newsweek's 2007 list of the Top 1,200 Public High Schools in the United States. The school was listed in 116th place, the second-highest ranked school in New Jersey, in the 2006 issue. Ridge High School was ranked as Number 91 in Newsweek's 2005 survey, third-highest in the state for that year.

Ridge High School was the 9th-best public high school in 2012 as rated by the New Jersey Monthly magazine and was the 140th best high school in the United States as rated by Newsweek, being the top-rated comprehensive high school in New Jersey.

In its 2013 report on "America's Best High Schools", The Daily Beast ranked the school 215th in the nation among participating public high schools and 16th overall (ninth among non-magnet schools) in New Jersey. The school was ranked 140th in the nation and eighth in New Jersey on the list of "America's Best High Schools 2012" prepared by The Daily Beast / Newsweek, with rankings based primarily on graduation rate, matriculation rate for college and number of Advanced Placement / International Baccalaureate courses taken per student, with lesser factors based on average scores on the SAT / ACT, average AP/IB scores and the number of AP/IB courses available to students.

The school was the 13th-ranked public high school in New Jersey out of 339 schools statewide in New Jersey Monthly magazine's September 2014 cover story on the state's "Top Public High Schools", using a new ranking methodology. The school had been ranked 9th in the state of 328 schools in 2012, after being ranked 12th in 2010 out of 322 schools listed. The magazine ranked the school 24th in 2008 out of 316 schools. Before that, the school was ranked 11th in the magazine's September 2006 issue, which included 316 schools across the state. Schooldigger.com ranked the school 27th out of 381 public high schools statewide in its 2011 rankings (an increase of 1 position from the 2010 ranking) which were based on the combined percentage of students classified as proficient or above proficient on the mathematics (95.2%) and language arts literacy (98.0%) components of the High School Proficiency Assessment (HSPA).

Ridge High School was ranked the 37th best high school in the United States and the 12th best in New Jersey by Newsweek in 2015.

In its listing of "America's Best High Schools 2016", the school was ranked 71st out of 500 best high schools in the country. It was ranked 15th among all high schools in New Jersey and third among the state's non-magnet schools.

== Athletics ==
The Ridge High School Red Devils competes in the Skyland Conference, which is comprised of public and private high schools in Hunterdon, Somerset and Warren counties in Central Jersey. The conference operates under the jurisdiction of the New Jersey State Interscholastic Athletic Association (NJSIAA). The school's current athletic director is Mike Mancino, who began his career in 2023. With 1,414 students in grades 10-12, the school was classified by the NJSIAA for the 2019–20 school year as Group IV for most athletic competition purposes, which included schools with an enrollment of 1,060 to 5,049 students in that grade range. Interscholastic sports offered at Ridge include volleyball, baseball, ice hockey, football, fencing, basketball, cross country, soccer, gymnastics, cheerleading, field hockey, golf, lacrosse, ski racing, softball, swimming, tennis, track and field, winter track, marching band, Special Olympics Unified Sports and wrestling.

The football team competes in Division 5B of the Big Central Football Conference, which includes 60 public and private high schools in Hunterdon, Middlesex, Somerset, Union and Warren counties, which are broken down into 10 divisions by size and location. The school was classified by the NJSIAA as Group IV North for football for 2024–2026, which included schools with 893 to 1,315 students.

The baseball team won the Group II state championship in 1987 (against runner-up Hackettstown High School in the finals), 2000 (vs. West Morris Mendham High School) and 2002 (vs. Dumont High School). The 2000 team finished the season with a record of 27-5 after winning the Group II state title with a 4-1 victory against Mendham in the championship game. In 2026, the team won its Group IV, Section 2 Final against Watchung Hills Warriors in a 3-2 victory. The team reached the Group IV state semi-final game but came up short against Ridgewood. The team has won the Somerset County Tournament in 1976, 1980, 1984, 1985, 1989, 2011 and 2022; the seven titles (through 2024) are the second-most in the tournament's history since it was established in 1973.

The school was the winner of the 2014-15 ShopRite Cup for Group II, finishing with 68 points, one point ahead of Hunterdon Central Regional High School. The team repeated as winner of the Group II ShopRite Cup for 2015-16, behind first-place finishes in girls soccer, girls cross country and boys fencing. The school finished in second place in girls tennis and girls golf, third place in football and ice hockey, and earned bonus points for having no disqualifications in the fall and spring seasons. The school was the winner of the Group IV winner of the 2019-20 Shop Rite Cup.

The girls' tennis team won the Group II state championship in 1984 (defeating runner-up Millburn High School in the tournament's final round) and 2016 (vs. Bergen Tech). The 2016 team defeated Princeton High School 4-1 in the semifinals before knocking off Bergen Tech 4-1 in the finals.

The 1985 boys' soccer team finished the season with a 20–0–2 record, the state's only unbeaten team, after winning the Group II state championship, defeating Millburn High School by a score of 3-0 in the final game of the tournament.

The boys' wrestling team won the Central Jersey Group II state sectional title and the overall Group II state championship in 1986.

The football team won the Central Jersey Group II state sectional title in 1987, the North II Group III championship in 2003 and the North II Group V title in 2013.

The girls' track team won the Group II indoor relay state championship in 1987 and 2007 (as co-champion).

The girls' soccer team won the Group II state championship in 1996 (vs. West Morris Mendham High School), won the Group III title in 2003 (vs. Colts Neck High School) and was Group IV co-champion in 2015 and 2017 (with Freehold Township High School both years). A 4-1 win against Colts Neck gave the team the Group III championship an undefeated 2003 season, leading the team to take the #3 national ranking with a 22–0 record. A scoreless tie after double overtime with Freehold Township gave the 2015 team a share of the Group IV title and a 23–0–1 record for the season. The 2017 team finished the season with a 18–4–2 record and was co-champion with Freehold Township High School after the Group IV title game ended in a scoreless tie after regulation and two overtime periods.

The girls' field hockey team won the North II Group III state sectional championship in 2005.

In 2007, the girls' cross country team finished third in the NJSIAA Meet of Champions and finished sixth at the Northeast Nike Team Regional Championships. The next year, the team finished #2 in the Meet of Champions and won the Section 2 Group 4 Championships and the Group 4 Championships. In 2009, the team got 6th place in the Meet of Champions; they took home fourth in 2010 and placed 6th in both the Meet of Champions and the Nike Northeast Regional Qualifier in 2011.

The boys' cross country team was the Group IV state champion in 2021. The team finished fourth in the NJSIAA Meet of Champions in 2006 and sixth in the NJSIAA Meet of Champions in 2010.

The ice hockey varsity team won the Public A state championship in 2008, 2007 and 2019, won the McInnis Cup in 2004, 2005 and 2007-2009 The team won the Public A state championship in 2008, with a 5-0 over Watchung Hills Regional High School in the tournament final. In 2017, the team went on to win its second Public A state championship, defeating Watchung Hills by a score of 2-1 in the tournament final. The team won the 2019 Public B state championship defeating Randolph High School.

The boy's varsity ski team won the 2009 New Jersey Interscholastic Ski Racing Association (NJISRA) overall state championship.

The boys' lacrosse team won the Group III state championship in 2010 (defeating West Windsor-Plainsboro High School North in the tournament final) and the Group IV title in 2013 (vs. Southern Regional High School); the team won the 2013 Tournament of Champions vs. Don Bosco Preparatory High School.

The Ridge girls' golf team won the 2015 Tournament of Champions, 26 strokes ahead of Red Bank Catholic High School in second place, marking the team's fifth consecutive state championship.

The Ridge girls' volleyball team won the Group IV state championship in 2017, defeating Cherokee High School.

In March 2022, at the National Scholastic Indoor Championships, the boys track team set a national high school record with a time of 9:53.40 in the distance medley relay.

In 2023, the boys' tennis team won the Group IV state championship, the program's first, with a 4-1 victory in the finals against Cherry Hill High School East.

== Extracurricular activities ==
The Ridge High School Forensics Team (speech and debate) has had numerous national champions. They have won the New Jersey state tournament every year from 2001 to 2025 (except for 2020, when it was cancelled due to the COVID-19 pandemic).

The Ridge Marching Band competes in the Fall season in the USBands and the New Jersey Marching Band Directors Association (NJMBDA) circuits. The marching band won its first NJ state championship in Group IIIA in 2015 with their program "Ridge in the City." The Marching Band placed 6th and 5th at USBands National Championships in 2012 and 2011, respectively. In 2012, despite being ranked 2nd going into National Championships, the band was unable to compete due to the damage in Basking Ridge from Hurricane Sandy. Prior to the creation of the USBands National Championships, the band placed 2nd at the USSBA Northern States Championships in 2005 and 2009, 3rd in 2008, and place in 2007. The now inactive Winter Guard has finished as high as 3rd in MAIN championships. Although the program no longer exists, the Indoor Percussion Ensemble placed 2nd at USBands Indoor Championships with its inaugural program in 2013 and won its first USBands Winter Standstill Percussion title in 2015. The marching band placed 2nd at the USBands National Championships in 2016, as well as winning caption awards for best overall effect and best percussion. The band has enjoyed many successes over recent years, most notably placing 1st in the USBands Yamaha Cup at MetLife Stadium in 2021 where they also swept all the caption awards. Despite performing in a torrential downpour, the band claimed 3rd place in Group IIA at the NJMBDA State Championships in 2023.

== Administration ==
Cheryl Howarth is the school's principal as of the 2026-27 school year. Core members of the school's administration include four assistant principals.

Previous principals include:

- William J. Keeler, 1961-1982
- Michael Pennella, 1982-1989
- Ronald Stevens, 1989-1996
- David Steffan, 1996-1999
- Richard Stotler, 1999-2006
- Frank Howlett, 2006-2017
- Drew Krause, 2017-2020
- Karen Hudock (interim), 2020-2020
- Russell Lazovick, 2020-2026

== Notable alumni ==
- Samir Banerjee (born 2003, class of 2022), tennis player who was the 2021 Wimbledon boys tennis champion
- J. C. Chandor (born 1974, class of 1992), Academy Award-nominated writer/director of the 2011 film Margin Call and the 2014 film A Most Violent Year
- Chris Daggett (born 1950, class of 1968), regional administrator of the United States Environmental Protection Agency, Commissioner of the New Jersey Department of Environmental Protection, and independent candidate for Governor of New Jersey in 2009
- Marc Del Gaizo (born 1999, class of 2018), professional ice hockey defenseman for the Nashville Predators of the National Hockey League
- Scott Fischer (1955–1996, class of 1973), climber and guide who was the first American to climb Lhotse, the fourth-highest mountain in the world, and who died in an attempt to climb Mount Everest in the 1996 Mount Everest disaster
- Jarryd Goldberg (born 1985, class of 2003), professional soccer player
- Tobin Heath (born 1988, class of 2006), 2015 and 2019 Women's World Cup champion, member of the United States women's national soccer team and two-time Olympic gold medalist
- Jared Isaacman (born 1983), businessman, pilot and astronaut
- Kelly-Anne Lyons (born 1985), actress, television presenter, writer and model, who starred in the BBC comedy Dick and Dom's Funny Business
- Max Mahoney (born 1998, class of 2016), professional basketball player for VfL Kirchheim Knights of the ProA
- Andrew Muscato (born 1985), filmmaker who was producer of the 2022 film The Greatest Beer Run Ever
- Stephen Pagliuca (born 1955, class of 1973), private equity investor, managing partner of Bain Capital and co-owner of the Boston Celtics
- Jasbir Puar (born 1967, class of 1985), queer theorist, Professor of Women and Gender Studies at Rutgers University and author of The Right to Maim
- Helen J. Shen (born 1999/2000, class of 2018), actress and singer, known for her roles on and off-Broadway
- Kelly Williford (born 1994), professional tennis player
- The Bouncing Souls, Punk rock band
