= Maplewood, New Jersey =

Township in Essex County, New Jersey, US

- Township
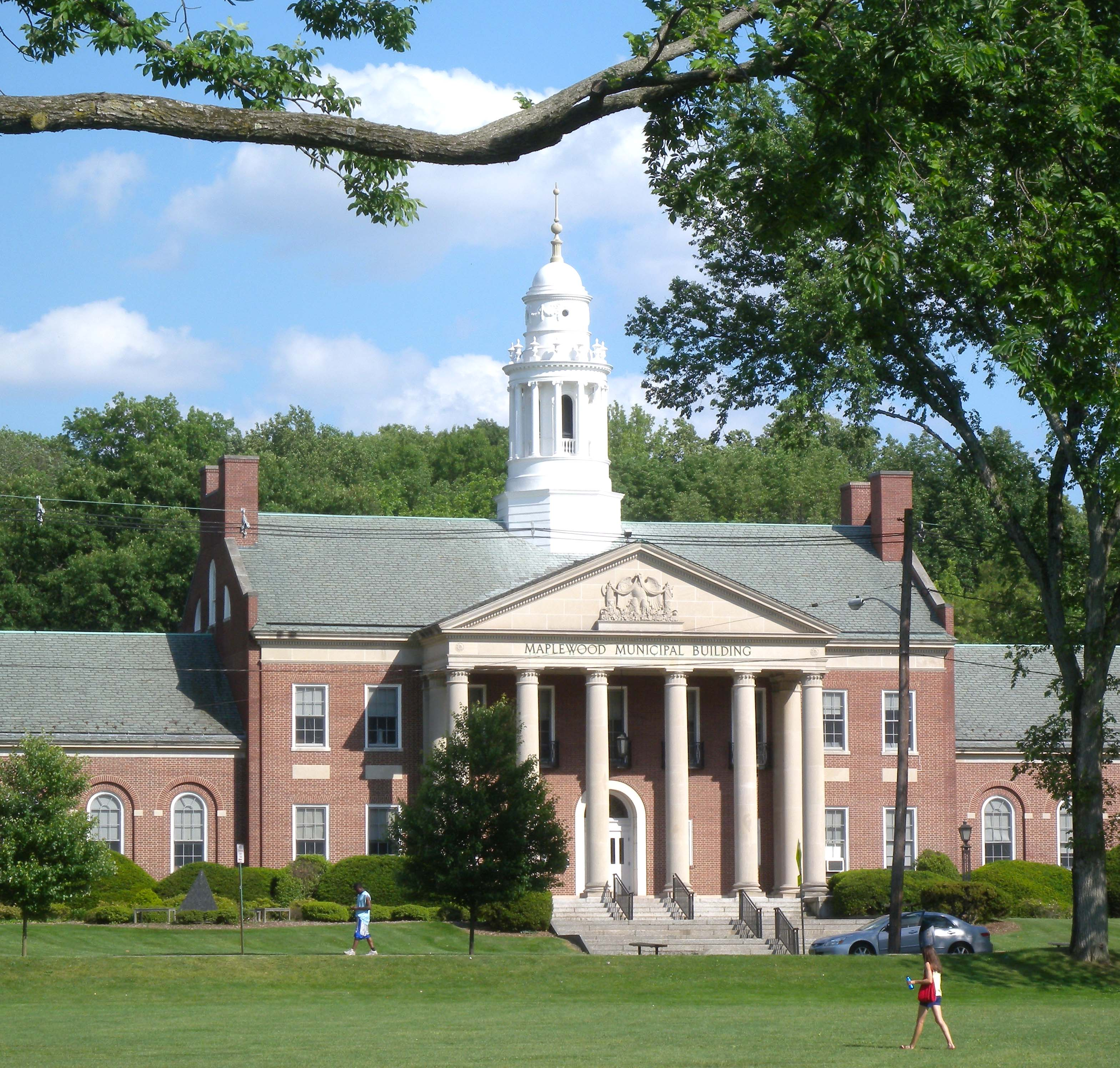
- Municipal Building

- Seal
- Interactive map of Maplewood, New Jersey
- Location in Essex County Location in New Jersey Location in the United States
- Coordinates: 40.733607°N 74.271159°W
- Country: United States
- State: New Jersey
- County: Essex
- Incorporated: April 1, 1861 as South Orange Township
- Renamed: November 7, 1922 as Maplewood township

Government
  - Type: Township
  - Body: Township Committee
  - Mayor: Victor De Luca (D, term ends December 31, 2026)
  - Administrator: Patrick Wherry
  - Municipal clerk: Elizabeth J. Fritzen

Area
  - Total: 3.88 sq mi (10.04 km^{2})
  - Land: 3.87 sq mi (10.03 km^{2})
  - Water: 0.0039 sq mi (0.01 km^{2}) 0.08%
  - Rank: 302nd of 565 in state 11th of 22 in county
- Elevation: 115 ft (35 m)

Population (2020)
  - Total: 25,684
  - Estimate (2024): 26,127
  - Rank: 101st of 565 in state 11th of 22 in county
  - Density: 6,629.8/sq mi (2,559.8/km^{2})
  - Rank: 74th of 565 in state 9th of 22 in county
- Time zone: UTC−05:00 (Eastern (EST))
  - Summer (DST): UTC−04:00 (Eastern (EDT))
- ZIP Code: 07040
- Area code: 973
- FIPS code: 3401343800
- GNIS feature ID: 0882220
- Website: maplewoodnj.gov

Maplewood is a township in Essex County in the U.S. state of New Jersey. The township is an inner-ring suburban bedroom community of New York City in the New York metropolitan area bordering the city of Newark. As of the 2020 United States census, the township's population was 25,684, an increase of 1,817 (+7.6%) from the 2010 census count of 23,867, which in turn reflected a decline of one person from the 23,868 counted in the 2000 census.

== History ==
When surveying the area now known as Maplewood, Robert Treat found several trails used by Lenape tribes of Algonquian Native Americans, though there was only sparse pre-European settlement. These paths form the basis for what are the township's modern-day thoroughfares.

The first European settlers arrived around 1675, primarily English, Dutch and French Puritans who had earlier settled Hempstead, Long Island (1643), New Haven, Connecticut (1638), and Stamford, Connecticut (1640), via Newark (1666) and Elizabeth (1664). They had acquired most of today's Essex County from the Native Americans through direct purchase upon first arrival and through royal assent. These early settlers then followed three trails that roughly correspond to South Orange Avenue, Springfield Avenue and Ridgewood Road into present-day Maplewood. These three routes resulted in the development of three separate communities that coalesced to become Maplewood and South Orange. Those who came from Newark on the trail that now corresponds to South Orange Avenue settled the area that became South Orange village.

Six families (with last names of Smith, Brown, Pierson, Freeman, Ball and Gildersleeve) came up today's Ridgewood Road and established scattered farms around a center that became Jefferson Village, named after Thomas Jefferson. This settlement, which roughly corresponds to downtown Maplewood today, developed several mills and orchards. John Durand, the son of Hudson River School painter Asher Brown Durand (who was born in Maplewood in 1796), describes the place as a picturesque but slightly backward community with close ties to Springfield. The apple harvest was apparently quite impressive and included the "Harrison" and "Canfield" varieties. By 1815, there were approximately 30 families in the community. Although the residents of the area were predominantly Presbyterian, the first house of worship was a Baptist chapel in 1812. This was in use until 1846 and fell into disrepair until 1858, when it was taken into use as a Methodist Episcopal church.

Those who came up today's Springfield Avenue settled on a hill crest near today's intersection between Tuscan and Springfield Avenue and established a hamlet known as North Farms. Over time, this community became known as the Hilton section. It became a stagecoach stop between Newark, Jersey City (then Paulus Hook), and Morristown and thereby a center for trade and light manufacturing. The village changed its name from North Farms to Middleville in 1830, and then to Hilton in 1880 when it was granted a post office. In 1855, Seth Boyden settled in what was then Middleville to retire but innovated a number of agricultural products, especially berries. Boyden also built and put into operation the first steam engines to service the railroad through Maplewood. The area became known for its orchards and related industries, including cider mills and rum distilleries, as well as honey and livestock.

In 1802, Jefferson Village and North Farms were named as districts within the Township of Newark.

The three communities developed and functioned independently, each establishing their own school associations: South Orange established the Columbian School in 1814, which would form the basis of Columbia High School; North Farms established the North Farms Association in 1817; and Jefferson Village the Jefferson Association in 1818. In 1867, when the State of New Jersey established public education through the School Law, the newly appointed County Superintendent merged the three associations into one school district, which was formalized in 1894 as the South Orange-Maplewood School District. James Ricalton, a teacher born in New York of Scottish parents who became the school district's first permanent teacher, helped set the high standard of education that persists in the school district to this day.

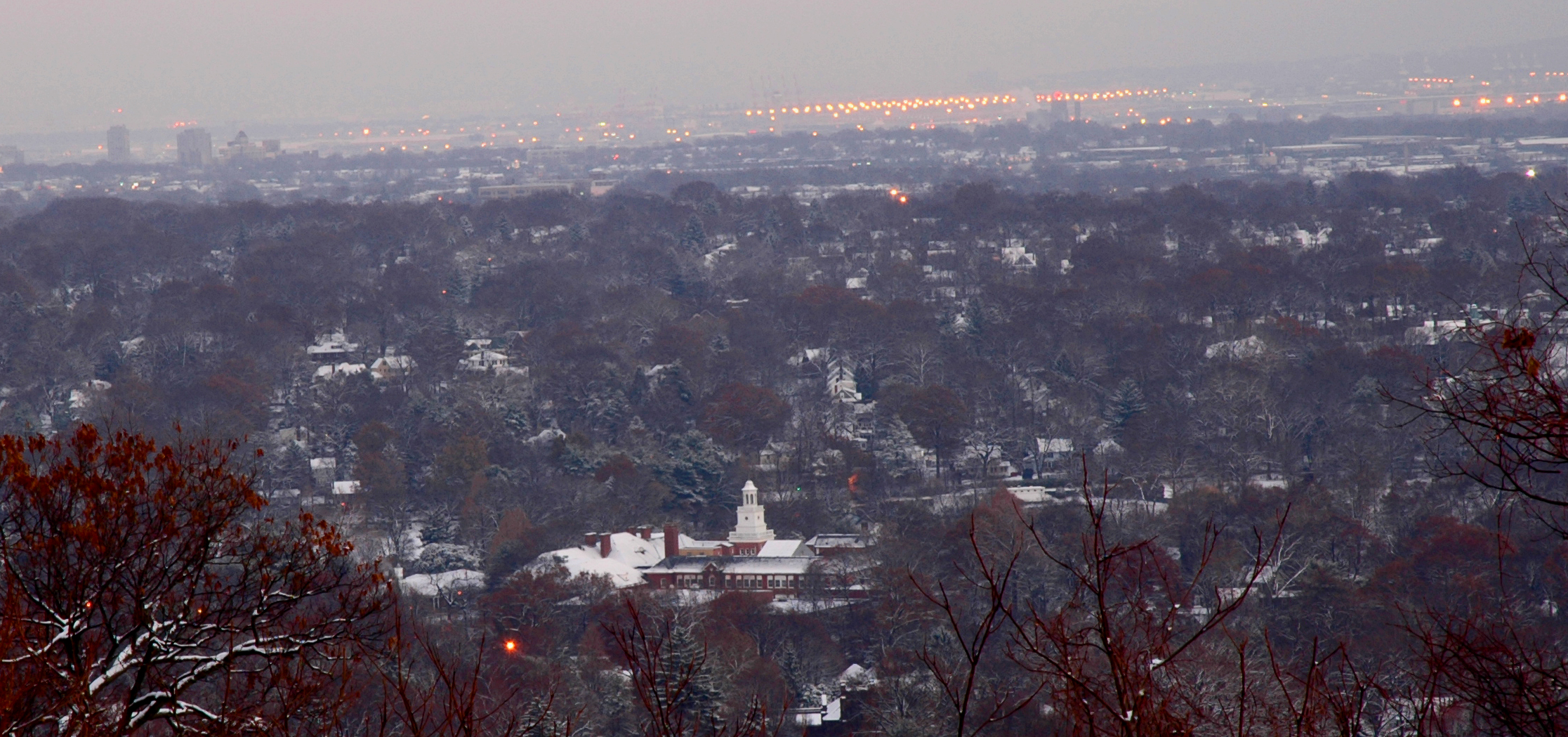
View of Maplewood from South Mountain Reservation

Maplewood was originally formed as South Orange Township, which was created on April 1, 1861, from portions of Clinton Township and what was then the Town of Orange. Portions of the township were taken to form South Orange village (established May 4, 1869, within the township and became fully independent on March 4, 1904) and Vailsburg borough (formed March 28, 1894, and annexed by Newark on January 1, 1905) The name of the township was changed to Maplewood on November 7, 1922.

When the Morris and Essex Railroad from Newark was extended to the area in 1838, a land speculator by the name of John Shedden built a railroad station in Jefferson Village and named it Maplewood. This name came to comprise areas known as Hilton, Jefferson Village, and areas previously part of Springfield. In 1868, farms were subdivided into parcels for residential housing and the area became a commuter suburb.

Edward Balch (1858–1934) was a homebuilder who envisioned Maplewood as a suburban community and starting around 1900 developed a total of 176 homes in the township, earning him recognition by The New York Times as the "Father of Maplewood."

The 1920s saw significant growth in new residents and structures.

== Geography ==
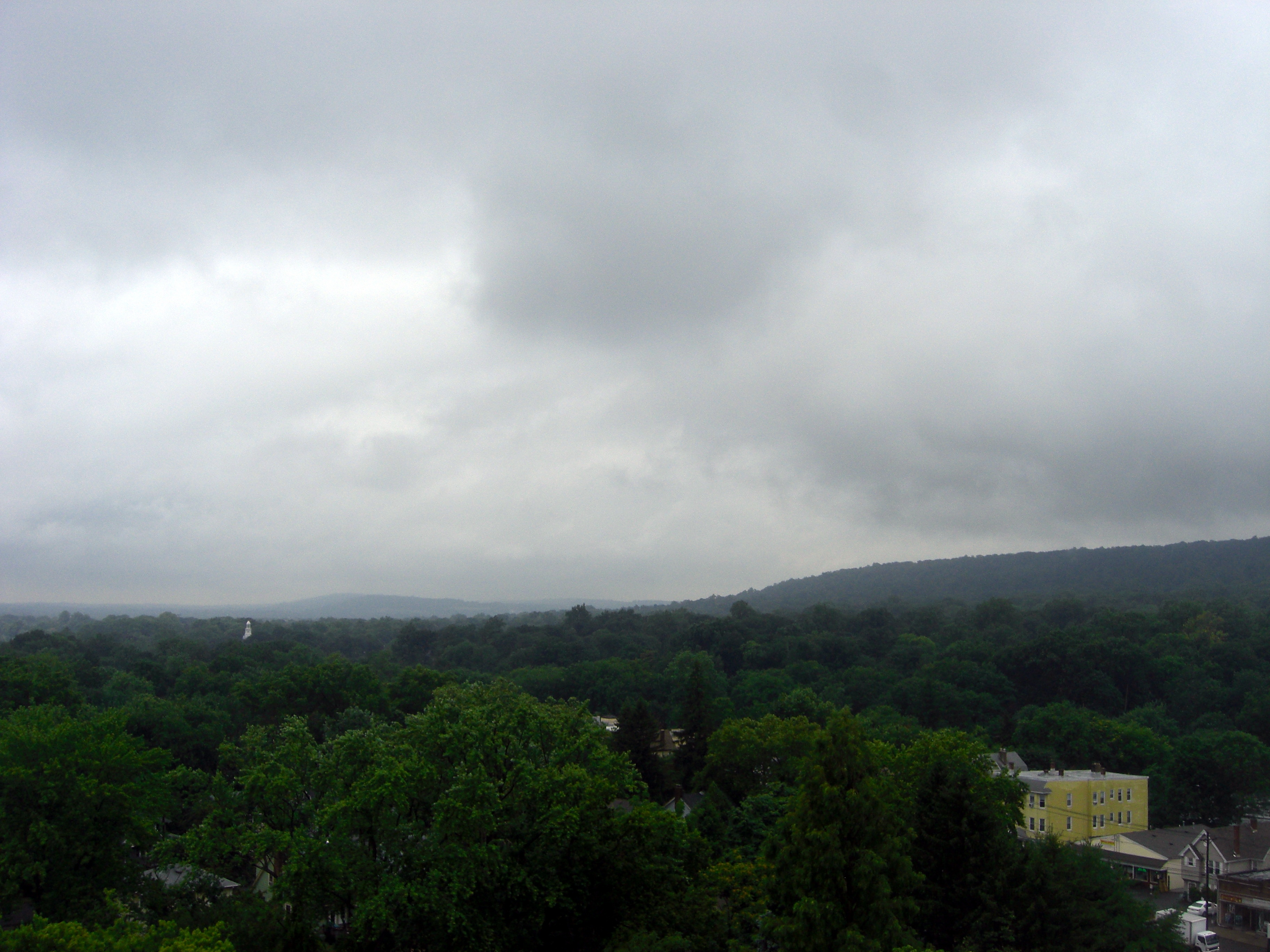
A view of Maplewood from the Columbia High School clocktower

According to the United States Census Bureau, the township had a total area of 3.88 square miles (10.04 km^{2}), including 3.87 square miles (10.03 km^{2}) of land and <0.01 square miles (0.01 km^{2}) of water (0.08%). A pond is in Memorial Park, the Rahway River runs through the township and there is a municipal pool club with four man-made pools of water; the remainder of the area is land.

The township shares a border with West Orange and South Orange to the north, Newark and Irvington to the east, Union (in Union County) to the south, and Millburn to the west.

Unincorporated communities, localities and place names located partially or completely within the township include Hilton and Valley View.

=== Climate ===
Maplewood has a hot-summer humid continental climate (Köppen climate classification Dfa).

Climate data for Maplewood
Month	Jan	Feb	Mar	Apr	May	Jun	Jul	Aug	Sep	Oct	Nov	Dec	Year
Mean daily maximum °F (°C)	39 (4)	42 (6)	51 (11)	62 (17)	72 (22)	81 (27)	86 (30)	84 (29)	77 (25)	66 (19)	55 (13)	44 (7)	63 (18)
Mean daily minimum °F (°C)	18 (−8)	20 (−7)	29 (−2)	38 (3)	48 (9)	57 (14)	62 (17)	61 (16)	53 (12)	40 (4)	33 (1)	24 (−4)	40 (5)
Average precipitation inches (mm)	4.13 (105)	3.00 (76)	4.17 (106)	4.22 (107)	4.74 (120)	4.41 (112)	4.73 (120)	4.74 (120)	5.03 (128)	4.18 (106)	4.41 (112)	3.85 (98)	51.61 (1,311)

== Demographics ==
Historical population
Census	Pop.	Note	%±
1870	2,963		—
1880	1,733	*	−41.5%
1890	1,078	*	−37.8%
1900	1,630		51.2%
1910	2,979		82.8%
1920	5,283		77.3%
1930	21,321		303.6%
1940	23,139		8.5%
1950	25,201		8.9%
1960	23,977		−4.9%
1970	24,932		4.0%
1980	22,950		−7.9%
1990	21,652		−5.7%
2000	23,868		10.2%
2010	23,867		0.0%
2020	25,684		7.6%
2024 (est.)	26,127		1.7%
Population sources: 1870–1920 1870 1880–1890; 1890–1910 1910–1930; 1940–2000 2000; 2010 2020 * = Lost territory in previous decade.

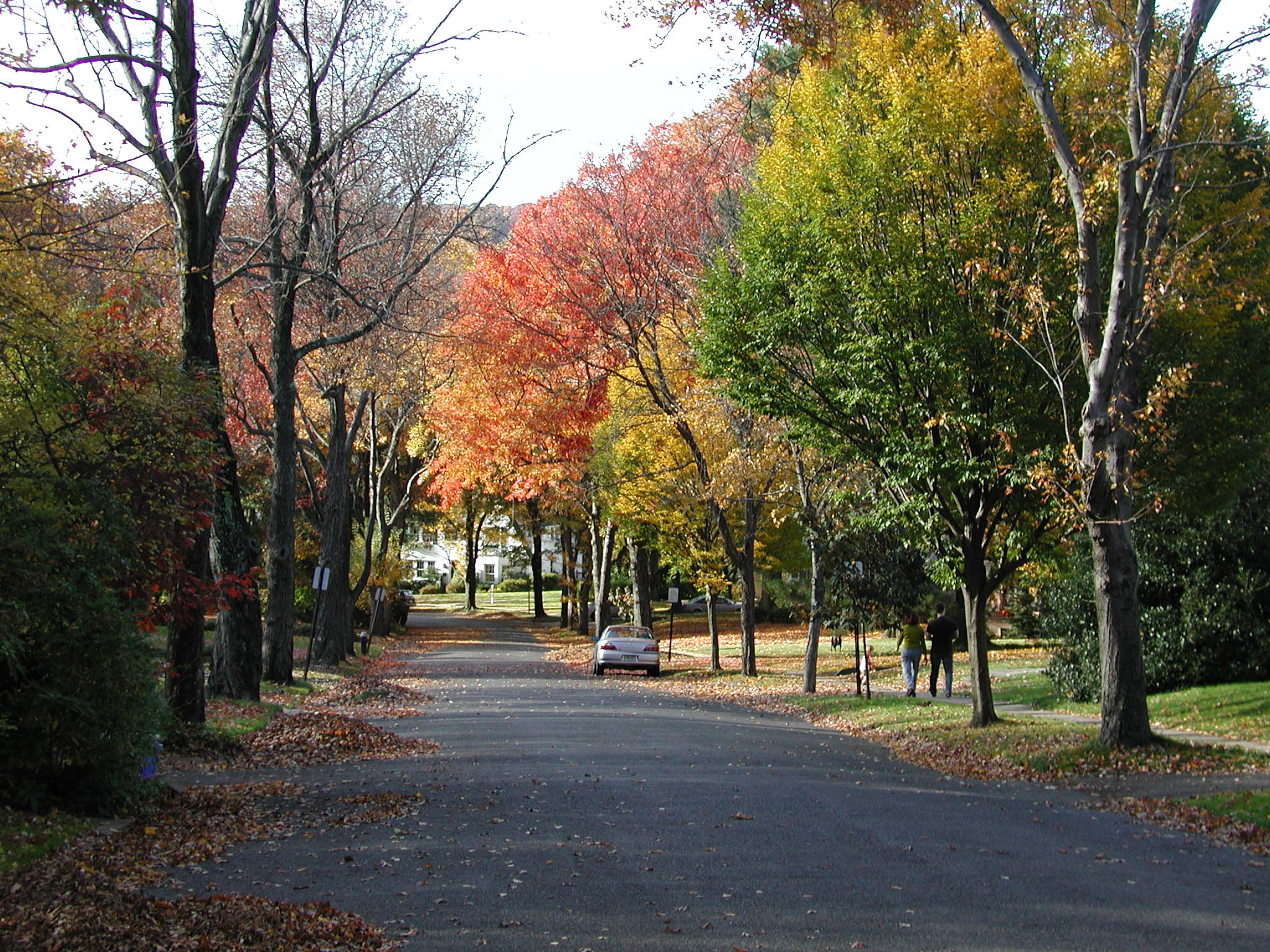
Maplewood in autumn

=== 2020 census ===
Maplewood township, Essex County, New Jersey – Racial and ethnic composition Note: the US Census treats Hispanic/Latino as an ethnic category. This table excludes Latinos from the racial categories and assigns them to a separate category. Hispanics/Latinos may be of any race.
Race / Ethnicity (NH = Non-Hispanic)	Pop 1990	Pop 2000	Pop 2010	Pop 2020	% 1990	% 2000	% 2010	% 2020
White alone (NH)	17,655	13,382	12,585	13,170	81.54%	56.07%	52.73%	51.28%
Black or African American alone (NH)	2,516	7,644	8,189	7,740	11.62%	32.03%	34.31%	30.14%
Native American or Alaska Native alone (NH)	17	25	17	30	0.08%	0.10%	0.07%	0.12%
Asian alone (NH)	649	660	722	951	3.00%	2.77%	3.03%	3.70%
Pacific Islander alone (NH)	N/A	6	4	4	N/A	0.03%	0.02%	0.02%
Some Other Race alone (NH)	35	97	110	166	0.16%	0.41%	0.46%	0.65%
Mixed Race or Multi-Racial (NH)	N/A	806	645	1,441	N/A	3.38%	2.70%	5.61%
Hispanic or Latino (any race)	780	1,248	1,595	2,182	3.60%	5.23%	6.68%	8.50%
Total	21,652	23,868	23,867	25,684	100.00%	100.00%	100.00%	100.00%

=== 2010 census ===
The 2010 United States census counted 23,867 people, 8,240 households, and 6,287 families in the township. The population density was 6,155.3 per square mile (2,376.6/km^{2}). There were 8,608 housing units at an average density of 2,220.0 per square mile (857.1/km^{2}). The racial makeup was 56.27% (13,430) White, 35.30% (8,426) Black or African American, 0.18% (44) Native American, 3.04% (725) Asian, 0.03% (6) Pacific Islander, 1.82% (434) from other races, and 3.36% (802) from two or more races. Hispanic or Latino of any race were 6.68% (1,595) of the population.

Of the 8,240 households, 42.8% had children under the age of 18; 57.8% were married couples living together; 14.5% had a female householder with no husband present and 23.7% were non-families. Of all households, 19.1% were made up of individuals and 9.3% had someone living alone who was 65 years of age or older. The average household size was 2.89 and the average family size was 3.33.

28.3% of the population were under the age of 18, 6.4% from 18 to 24, 24.9% from 25 to 44, 29.5% from 45 to 64, and 11.0% who were 65 years of age or older. The median age was 39.6 years. For every 100 females, the population had 90.6 males. For every 100 females ages 18 and older there were 85.4 males.

The Census Bureau's 2006–2010 American Community Survey showed that (in 2010 inflation-adjusted dollars) median household income was $101,463 (with a margin of error of +/− $6,610) and the median family income was $122,102 (+/− $9,324). Males had a median income of $83,656 (+/− $10,885) versus $57,422 (+/− $5,551) for females. The per capita income for the borough was $47,404 (+/− $2,404). About 1.5% of families and 2.8% of the population were below the poverty line, including 1.5% of those under age 18 and 3.1% of those age 65 or over.

=== 2000 census ===
As of the 2000 United States census there were 23,868 people, 8,452 households, and 6,381 families residing in the township. The population density was 6,207.1 inhabitants per square mile (2,396.6/km^{2}). There were 8,615 housing units at an average density of 2,240.4 per square mile (865.0/km^{2}). The racial makeup of the township was 58.78% White, 32.63% Black, 0.13% Native American, 2.86% Asian, 0.03% Pacific Islander, 1.56% from other races, and 4.01% from two or more races. Hispanic or Latino of any race were 5.23% of the population.

There were 8,452 households, out of which 40.6% had children under the age of 18 living with them, 58.2% were married couples living together, 13.3% had a female householder with no husband present, and 24.5% were non-families. 20.4% of all households were made up of individuals, and 9.8% had someone living alone who was 65 years of age or older. The average household size was 2.81 and the average family size was 3.27.

In the township, the age distribution of the population shows 28.0% under the age of 18, 5.6% from 18 to 24, 30.2% from 25 to 44, 24.0% from 45 to 64, and 12.1% who were 65 years of age or older. The median age was 38 years. For every 100 females, there were 90.6 males. For every 100 females age 18 and over, there were 86.1 males.

The median income for a household in the township was $79,637, and the median income for a family was $92,724. Males had a median income of $57,572 versus $41,899 for females. The per capita income for the township was $36,794. 4.4% of the population and 3.4% of families were below the poverty line. 4.9% of those under the age of 18 and 6.0% of those 65 and older were living below the poverty line.

== Arts and culture ==
In 2018 Brooke Lea Foster of The New York Times described Maplewood as one of several "least suburban of suburbs, each one celebrated by buyers there for its culture and hip factor, as much as the housing stock and sophisticated post-city life."

=== Performance venues ===
The township owns and operates the Burgdorff Center for the Performing Arts at 10 Durand Road. The Center, a former Christian Science Church, was donated to the town by Jean Burgdorff, a local real estate entrepreneur. The building was transferred to the town on October 15, 1988. In 2008, the township committed to a $130,000 plan to improve the building.

=== Maplewoodstock ===
Every year, on the weekend following the weekend closest to July 4, there is a concert in town called Maplewoodstock. The free concert consists of local and national bands performing alongside various stalls showcasing local businesses.

=== Architecture and landscape ===
Many of the more recognizable buildings and spaces were the work of famous architects and landscape designers. Most of the schools and the Municipal Building were the work of Guilbert & Betelle. The center of town is dominated by Memorial Park, a design of the Olmsted Brothers. The Olmsted firm was also responsible for the landscaping at Ward Homestead, designed by John Russell Pope, and now known as Winchester Gardens, located on Elmwood Avenue. On the opposite side of town is another Olmsted work, South Mountain Reservation. The Maplewood Theater, designed by William E. Lehman, was where Cheryl Crawford first revived Porgy and Bess.

=== Popular culture ===
- Ultimate Frisbee (now called simply "Ultimate") was invented in Maplewood in 1968 by students at Columbia High School. A plaque commemorating the birthplace of Ultimate Frisbee is located in the student parking lot.
- Maplewood is the birthplace of the wooden golf tee, invented by William Lowell at the Maplewood Golf Club in 1921.
- Maplewood has been the site for several films, including I Wanna Hold Your Hand, Garden State, Gracie, One True Thing, Stepmom, and A Good Person.
- Zach Braff, a Columbia High School alumnus, filmed a scene in his 2004 film, Garden State, where he and Natalie Portman drive by the front of Columbia High School.
- In the 2007 film Gracie, the plot is set in and partially filmed in Maplewood and Columbia High School. Producer Andrew Shue and actress Elisabeth Shue both attended Columbia, and the plot is loosely based on their lives during high school.
- Bullet For My Valentine filmed their music video for "Waking the Demon" in Maplewood.
- The main character of the Robert Sheckley novel Dimension of Miracles, Thomas Carmody, is from Maplewood. He revisits the town, albeit one belonging in an alternate universe, late in the book.
- Novelist Philip Roth, who grew up in neighboring Newark refers to Maplewood in several of his novels, including Goodbye, Columbus.
- StarFish, a rock band for children.
- Maplewood is thought by some to be an inspiration for the fictional town River Heights in the Nancy Drew books, as ghost writer Harriet Adams resided in the town while writing some of the series.
- The Polar Express (film) mentions Maplewood, New Jersey.

== Parks and recreation ==
- Memorial Park is a 25-acre (10 ha) park adjacent to the railway station, designed in the 1920s by landscape architects Brinley and Holbrook and the Olmsted Brothers that has been listed on the National Register of Historic Places. Other town parks include Maplecrest Park, DeHart Park and Milo S. Borden Park.
- The town is bordered to the northwest by South Mountain Reservation, a 2,100-acre (850 ha) nature reserve on the Rahway River that is part of the Essex County Park System.
- The East Branch of the Rahway River travels through the township.

== Government ==
=== Local government ===
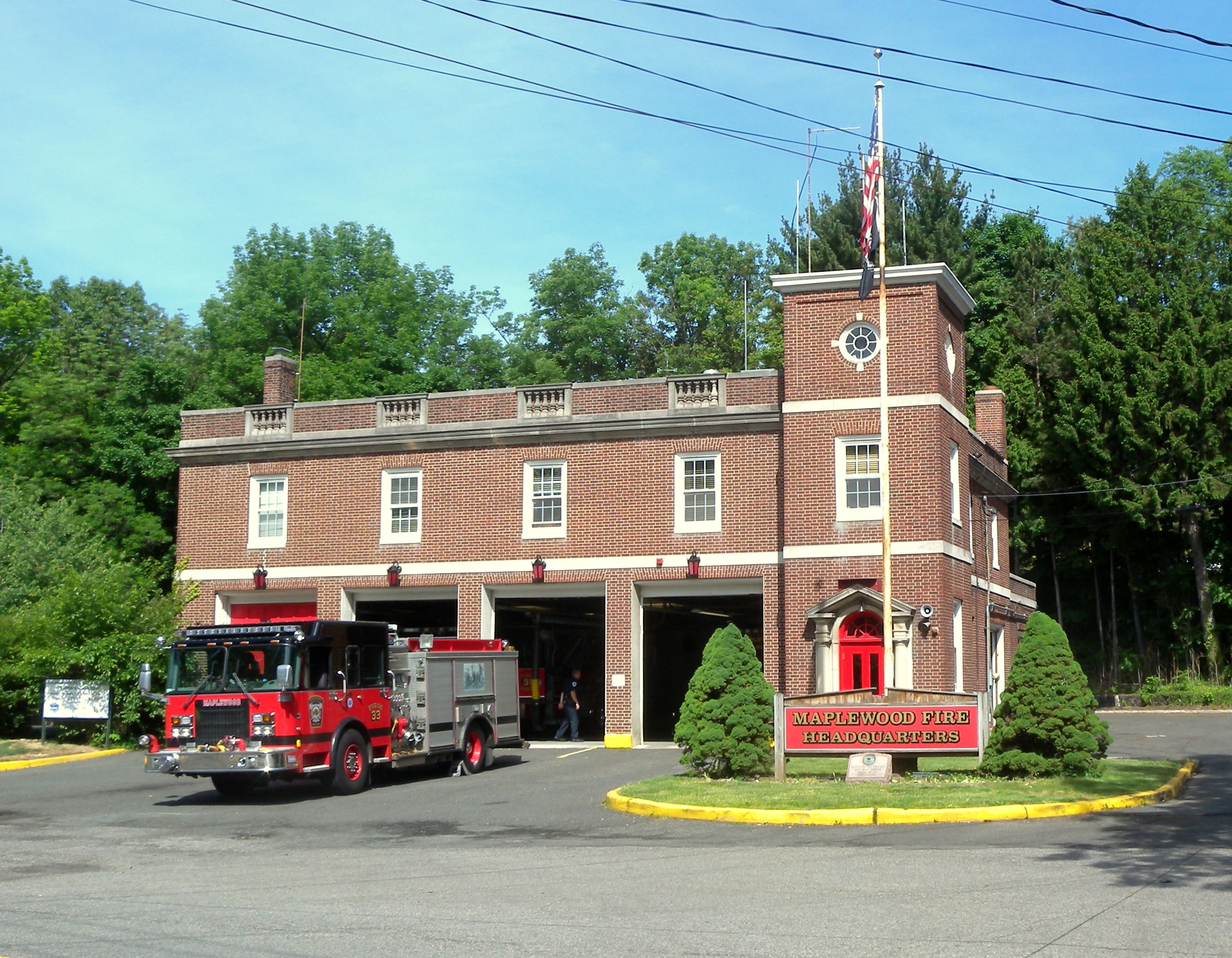
Fire Headquarters

Maplewood is governed under the Township form of government, one of 141 municipalities (of the 564) statewide that use this form. The governing body is a Township Committee, which is comprised of five members who are elected directly by the voters at-large in partisan elections to serve three-year terms of office on a staggered basis, with either one or two seats coming up for election each year as part of the November general election in a three-year cycle. At an annual reorganization meeting, the Township Committee selects one of its members to serve as Mayor for a one-year term, and another to serve as Deputy Mayor. The Mayor has the responsibility of Chair for the Township Committee meetings with voice and vote. The Mayor is considered the head of the municipal government.

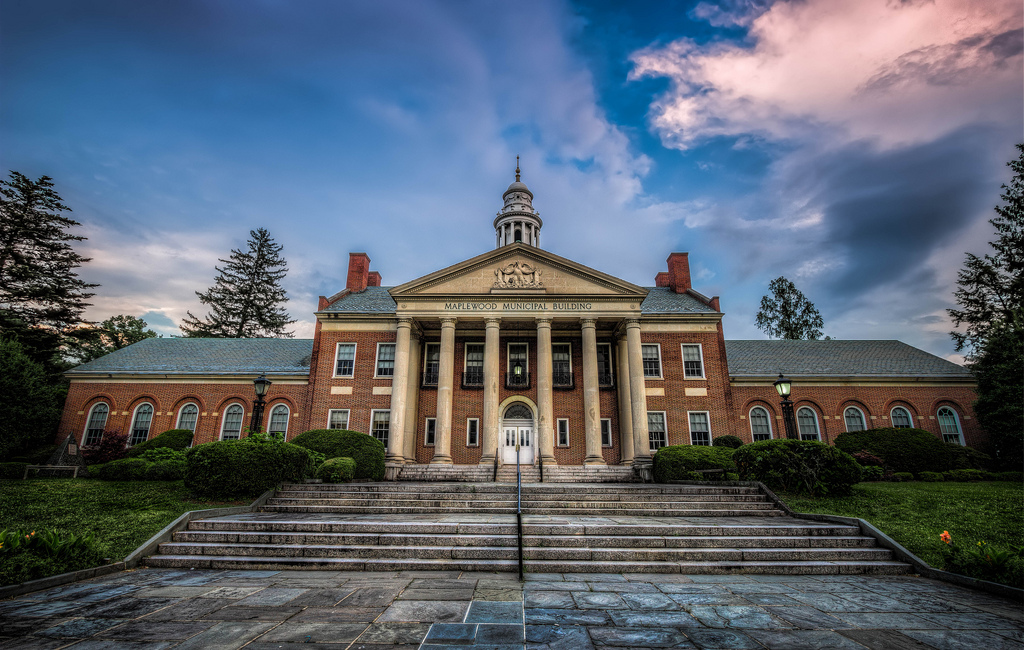
Municipal Building

The Township Committee is the legislative body of the municipality and is responsible for enacting the township's laws. The Township Committee is also an executive body. Under this form of government, the elected Township Committee sets policy and overall direction for the Township. The Township staff, under the direction of the Township Administrator, carries out Committee policy and provides day to day services. The Township Administrator serves as the chief administrative officer and is accountable to the Township Committee.

As of 2026, members of the Maplewood Township Committee are Mayor Victor De Luca (D, term on committee and as mayor ends December 31, 2026), Deputy Mayor Malia Herman (D, term on committee ends 2027; term as deputy mayor ends 2026), Nancy J. Adams (D, 2027), Jane Collins-Colding (D, 2028) and Dean Dafis (D, 2026).

Fire protection in the township is provided by the South Essex Fire Department, which was formed in July 2022 as the successor to the former Maplewood Fire Department and South Orange Fire Department.

=== Federal, state, and county representation ===
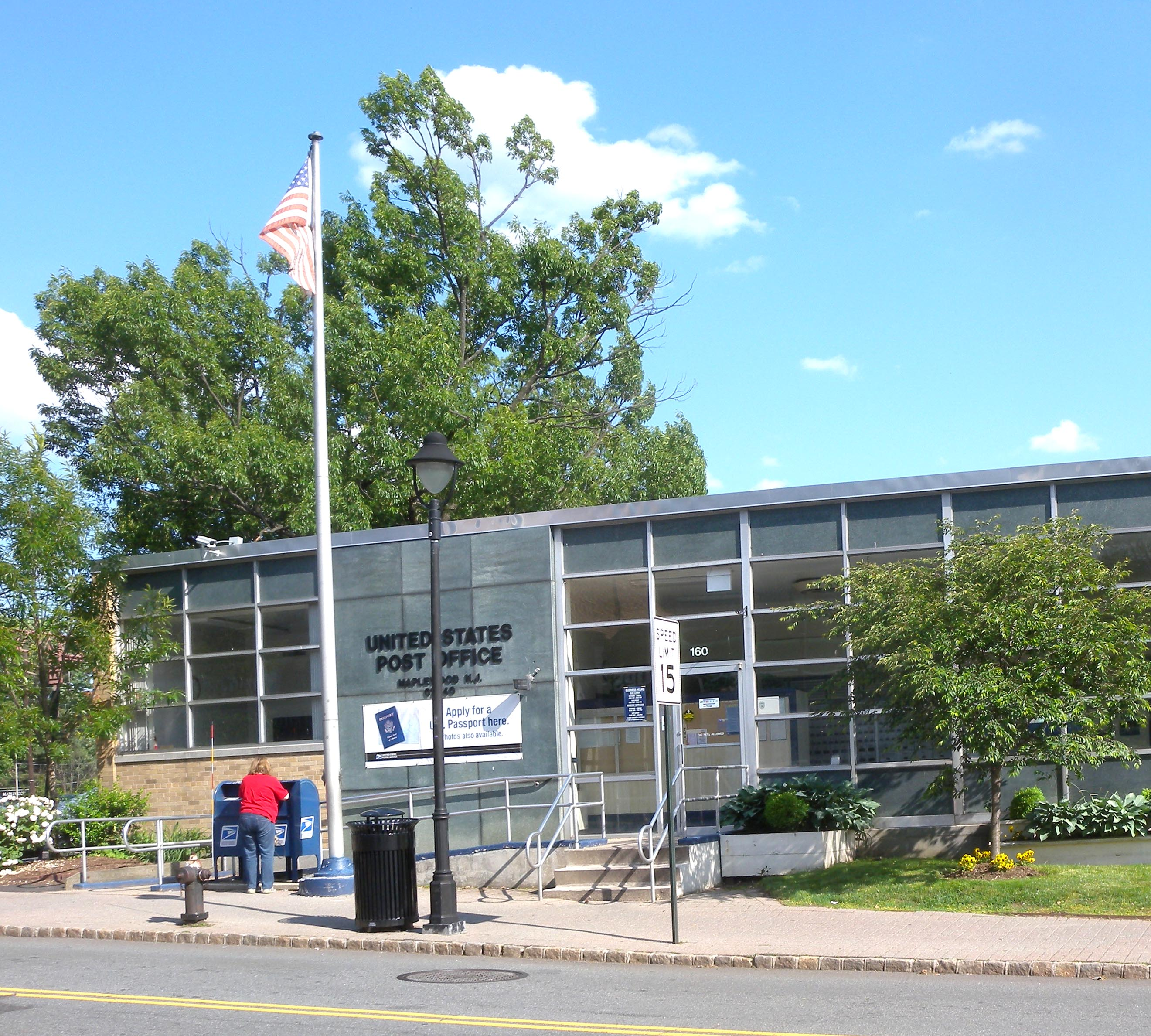
Post Office

Maplewood is located in the 11th Congressional District and is part of New Jersey's 27th state legislative district.

For the 119th United States Congress, New Jersey's 11th congressional district is represented by Analilia Mejia (D, Glen Ridge) who was elected in a 2026 special election to serve for the remainder of the Congress following the resignation Mikie Sherrill (D, Montclair), who was elected Governor of New Jersey in 2025. New Jersey is represented in the United States Senate by Democrats Cory Booker (Newark, term ends 2027) and Andy Kim (Moorestown, term ends 2031).

For the 2026–2027 session, the 27th legislative district of the New Jersey Legislature is represented in the State Senate by John F. McKeon (D, West Orange) and in the General Assembly by Rosy Bagolie (D, Livingston) and Alixon Collazos-Gill (D, Montclair).

Essex County is governed by a directly elected county executive, with legislative functions performed by the Board of County Commissioners. As of 2025, the County Executive is Joseph N. DiVincenzo Jr. (D, Roseland), whose four-year term of office ends December 31, 2026. The county's Board of County Commissioners is composed of nine members, five of whom are elected from districts and four of whom are elected on an at-large basis. They are elected for three-year concurrent terms and may be re-elected to successive terms at the annual election in November. Essex County's Commissioners are:

Robert Mercado (D, District 1 – Newark's North and East Wards, parts of Central and West Wards; Newark, 2026), A'Dorian Murray-Thomas (D, District 2 – Irvington, Maplewood and parts of Newark's South and West Wards; Newark, 2026), Vice President Tyshammie L. Cooper (D, District 3 - Newark: West and Central Wards; East Orange, Orange and South Orange; East Orange, 2026), Leonard M. Luciano (D, District 4 – Caldwell, Cedar Grove, Essex Fells, Fairfield, Livingston, Millburn, North Caldwell, Roseland, Verona, West Caldwell and West Orange; West Caldwell, 2026), President Carlos M. Pomares (D, District 5 – Belleville, Bloomfield, Glen Ridge, Montclair and Nutley; Bloomfield, 2026), Brendan W. Gill (D, at large; Montclair, 2026), Romaine Graham (D, at large; Irvington, 2026), Wayne Richardson (D, at large; Newark, 2026), Patricia Sebold (D, at-large; Livingston, 2026).

Constitutional officers elected countywide are: Clerk Christopher J. Durkin (D, West Caldwell, 2025), Register of Deeds Juan M. Rivera Jr. (D, Newark, 2029), Sheriff Amir Jones (D, Newark, 2027), and Surrogate Alturrick Kenney (D, Newark, 2028).

=== Politics ===
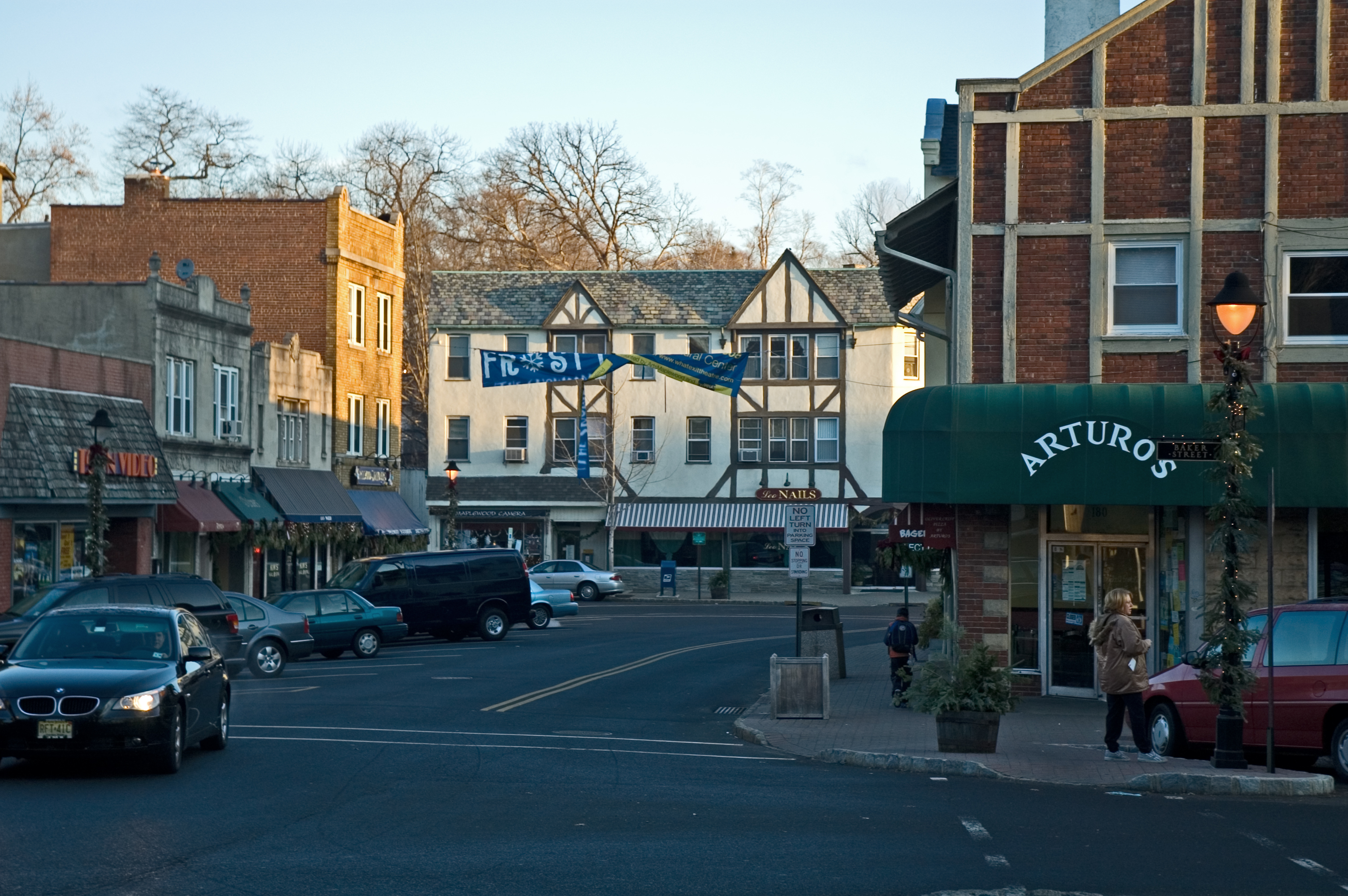
Maplewood Village

As of March 2011, there were a total of 16,399 registered voters in Maplewood, of which 9,306 (56.7%) were registered as Democrats, 1,439 (8.8%) were registered as Republicans and 5,645 (34.4%) were registered as Unaffiliated. There were 9 voters registered as Libertarians or Greens.

Gubernatorial election results for Maplewood
Year	Republican		Democratic		Third party(ies)	
Year	No.	%	No.	%	No.	%
2025	994	8.05%	11,284	91.41%	66	0.53%
2021	937	10.00%	8,344	89.04%	90	0.96%
2017	805	10.05%	6,971	87.00%	237	2.96%
2013	2,074	29.61%	4,833	69.00%	97	1.38%
2009	1,650	20.39%	5,871	72.54%	572	7.07%
2005	1,830	22.86%	6,010	75.08%	165	2.06%

In the 2012 presidential election, Democrat Barack Obama received 84.4% of the vote (10,007 cast), ahead of Republican Mitt Romney with 14.9% (1,764 votes), and other candidates with 0.8% (91 votes), among the 11,924 ballots cast by the township's 17,391 registered voters (62 ballots were spoiled), for a turnout of 68.6%. In the 2008 presidential election, Democrat Barack Obama received 81.9% of the vote (10,649 cast), ahead of Republican John McCain with 16.6% (2,156 votes) and other candidates with 0.7% (90 votes), among the 13,003 ballots cast by the township's 16,523 registered voters, for a turnout of 78.7%. In the 2004 presidential election, Democrat John Kerry received 76.3% of the vote (9,113 ballots cast), outpolling Republican George W. Bush with 22.7% (2,709 votes) and other candidates with 0.6% (90 votes), among the 11,943 ballots cast by the township's 15,289 registered voters, for a turnout percentage of 78.1.

United States presidential election results for Maplewood
Year	Republican		Democratic		Third party(ies)	
Year	No.	%	No.	%	No.	%
2024	1,231	8.67%	12,735	89.72%	228	1.61%
2020	1,294	8.59%	13,610	90.38%	154	1.02%
2016	1,248	9.59%	11,443	87.89%	328	2.52%
2012	1,764	14.87%	10,007	84.36%	91	0.77%
2008	2,156	16.72%	10,649	82.58%	90	0.70%
2004	2,709	22.74%	9,113	76.50%	90	0.76%

In the 2013 gubernatorial election, Democrat Barbara Buono received 69.0% of the vote (4,833 cast), ahead of Republican Chris Christie with 29.6% (2,074 votes), and other candidates with 1.4% (97 votes), among the 7,116 ballots cast by the township's 17,502 registered voters (112 ballots were spoiled), for a turnout of 40.7%. In the 2009 gubernatorial election, Democrat Jon Corzine received 72.2% of the vote (5,871 ballots cast), ahead of Republican Chris Christie with 20.3% (1,650 votes), Independent Chris Daggett with 6.2% (507 votes) and other candidates with 0.8% (65 votes), among the 8,135 ballots cast by the township's 16,202 registered voters, yielding a 50.2% turnout.

United States Senate election results for Maplewood1
Year	Republican		Democratic		Third party(ies)	
Year	No.	%	No.	%	No.	%
2024	1,234	8.88%	12,367	88.99%	296	2.13%
2018	1,128	10.64%	9,257	87.34%	214	2.02%
2012	1,641	14.96%	9,129	83.25%	196	1.79%
2006	1,685	20.87%	6,296	77.98%	93	1.15%

United States Senate election results for Maplewood2
Year	Republican		Democratic		Third party(ies)	
Year	No.	%	No.	%	No.	%
2020	1,373	9.22%	13,274	89.18%	237	1.59%
2014	891	13.47%	5,620	84.93%	106	1.60%
2013	739	12.68%	5,062	86.86%	27	0.46%
2008	2,302	19.95%	9,070	78.62%	164	1.42%

== Community ==
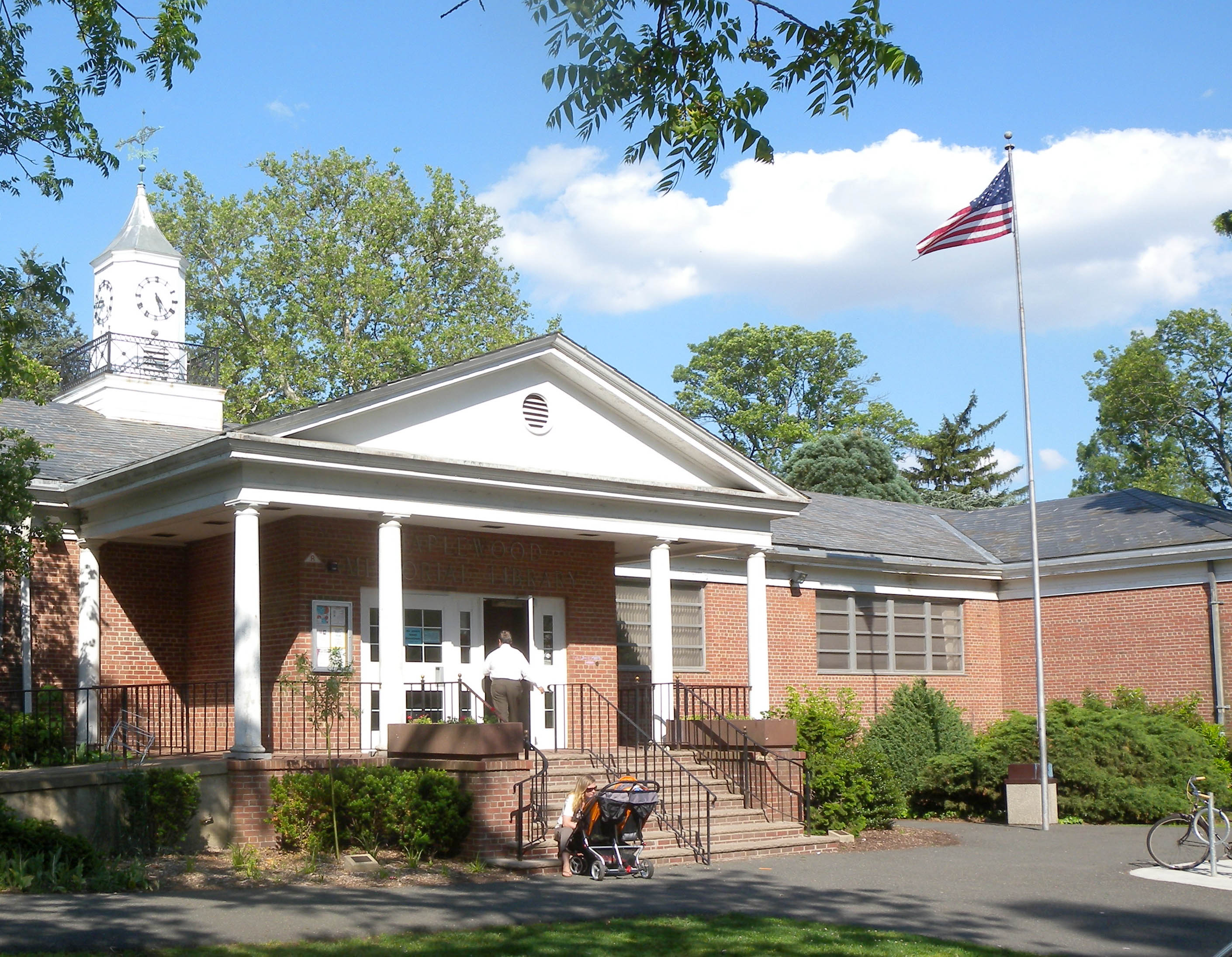
Public Library

Maplewood is a diverse and family-friendly community. The township has a downtown area alternatively known as "the village" or "Maplewood Center". The structure of the downtown is largely unchanged since the 1950s. Maplewood won New Jersey Monthly magazine's Downtown Showdown in 2015, with the editor's noting the community's "myriad boutiques, art galleries and notable restaurants".

Maplewood is home to a gay village or "gayborhood." In June 2018, Maplewood unveiled permanently rainbow-colored crosswalks to celebrate LGBTQ pride across the full year.

Maplewood counts among its residents a large number of theater professionals working in Broadway and off-Broadway productions, owing to the town's convenient rail access and relatively short commute via train into Manhattan. In 2010, a group of 32 of these actors and technicians formed their own repertory theater company and named it Midtown Direct Rep, after the NJ Transit line on which they all commuted.

== Education ==
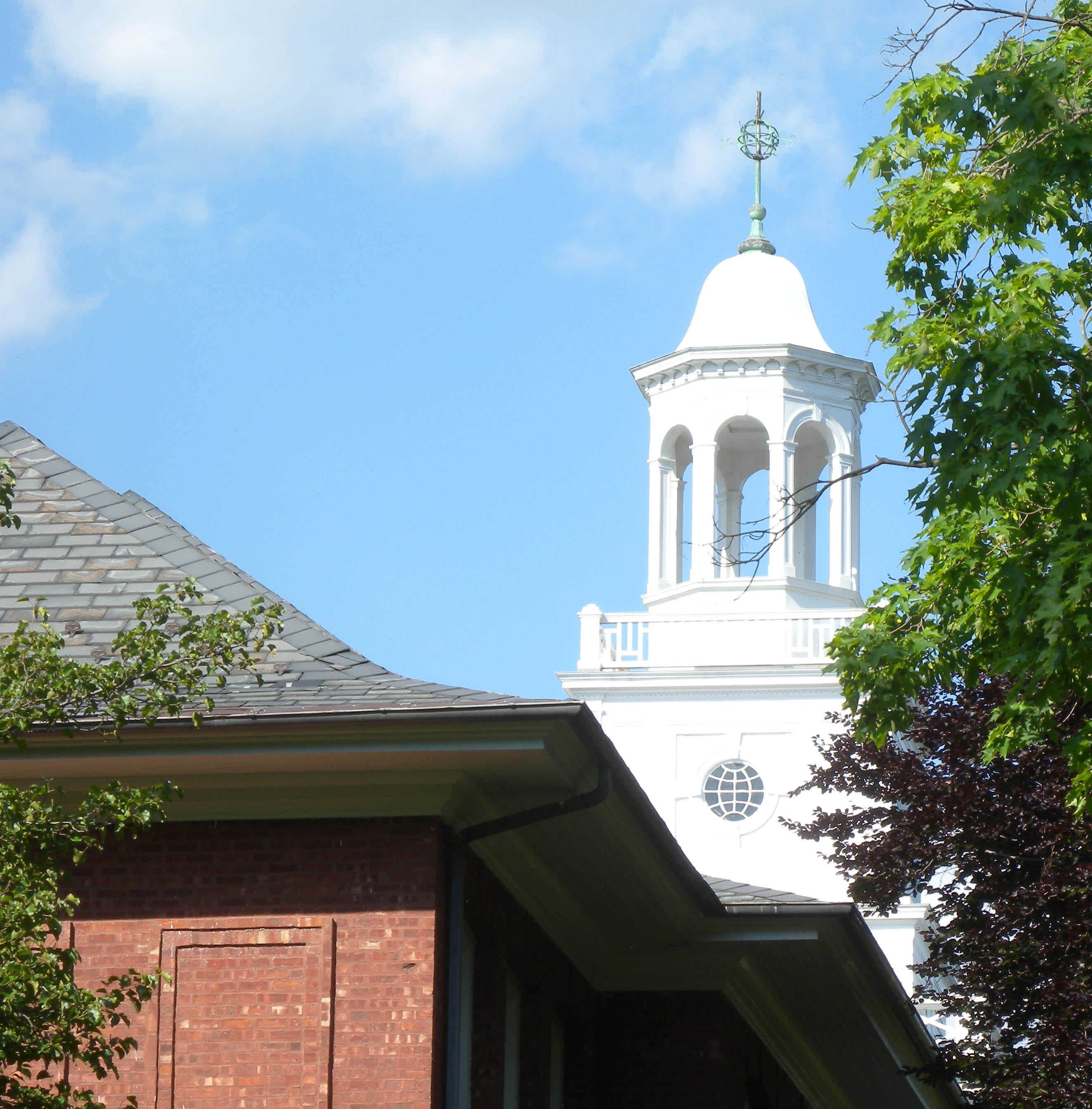
Maplewood Middle School

Maplewood is part of the unified South Orange-Maplewood School District, together with the neighboring community of South Orange. The district has a single high school (located in Maplewood), two middle schools, a central pre-school, and neighborhood elementary schools in each municipality. As of the 2019–20 school year, the district, comprised of 11 schools, had an enrollment of 7,353 students and 576.1 classroom teachers (on an FTE basis), for a student–teacher ratio of 12.8:1. Schools in the district (with 2019–20 school enrollment data from the National Center for Education Statistics) are Montrose Early Childhood Center (133 students, in Pre-K; located in Maplewood), Seth Boyden Elementary Demonstration School (493 students, in grades K–5 located in Maplewood), Clinton Elementary School (605, K–5; Maplewood), Jefferson Elementary School (544, 3–5; Maplewood), Marshall Elementary School (518, K–2; South Orange), South Mountain Elementary School (647, K–5; South Orange), South Mountain Elementary School Annex (NA, K–1; South Orange), Tuscan Elementary School (K–5, 637; Maplewood), Maplewood Middle School (827, 6–8; Maplewood), South Orange Middle School (786, 6–8; South Orange) and Columbia High School (1,967, 9–12; Maplewood).

As of the 2021–22 school year, the district has implemented an intentional integration initiative that aims to rebalance the district's elementary and middle schools via socio-economic status.

== Transportation ==
=== Roads and highways ===
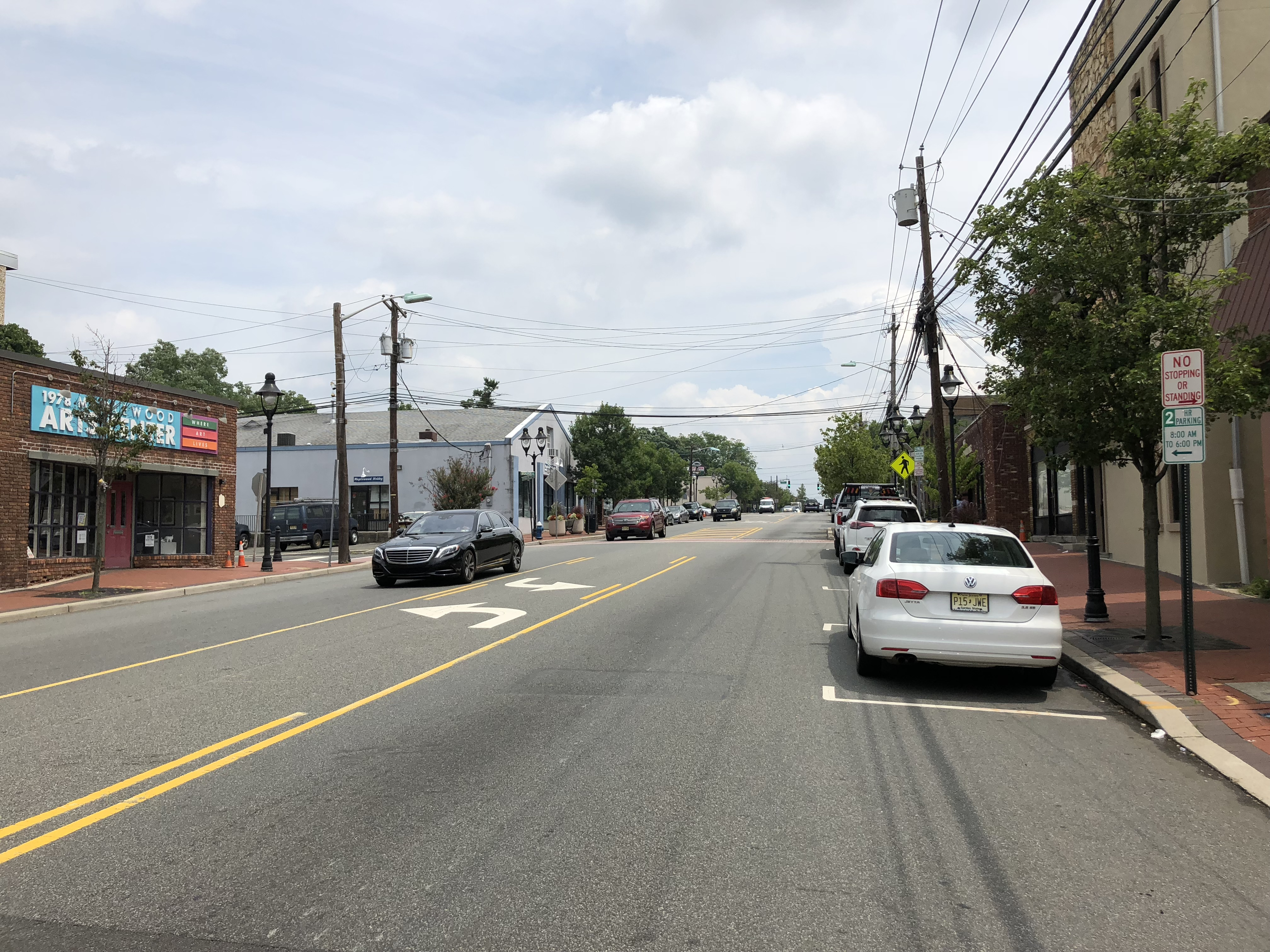
Route 124 (Springfield Avenue) eastbound in Maplewood

As of May 2010, the township had a total of 59.06 miles (95.05 km) of roadways, of which 54.56 miles (87.81 km) were maintained by the municipality, 4.47 miles (7.19 km) by Essex County and 0.03 miles (0.048 km) by the New Jersey Department of Transportation. Two nearby controlled-access highways serve Maplewood: the Garden State Parkway, which runs north–south, and Interstate 78, which runs east–west.

There are approximately 226 streets within Maplewood. Springfield Avenue is a state highway (Route 124), from Irvington to Morristown, and four thoroughfares are Essex County roads (Valley Street, Millburn Avenue, Irvington Avenue, Wyoming Avenue), including County Route 577.

=== Public transportation ===
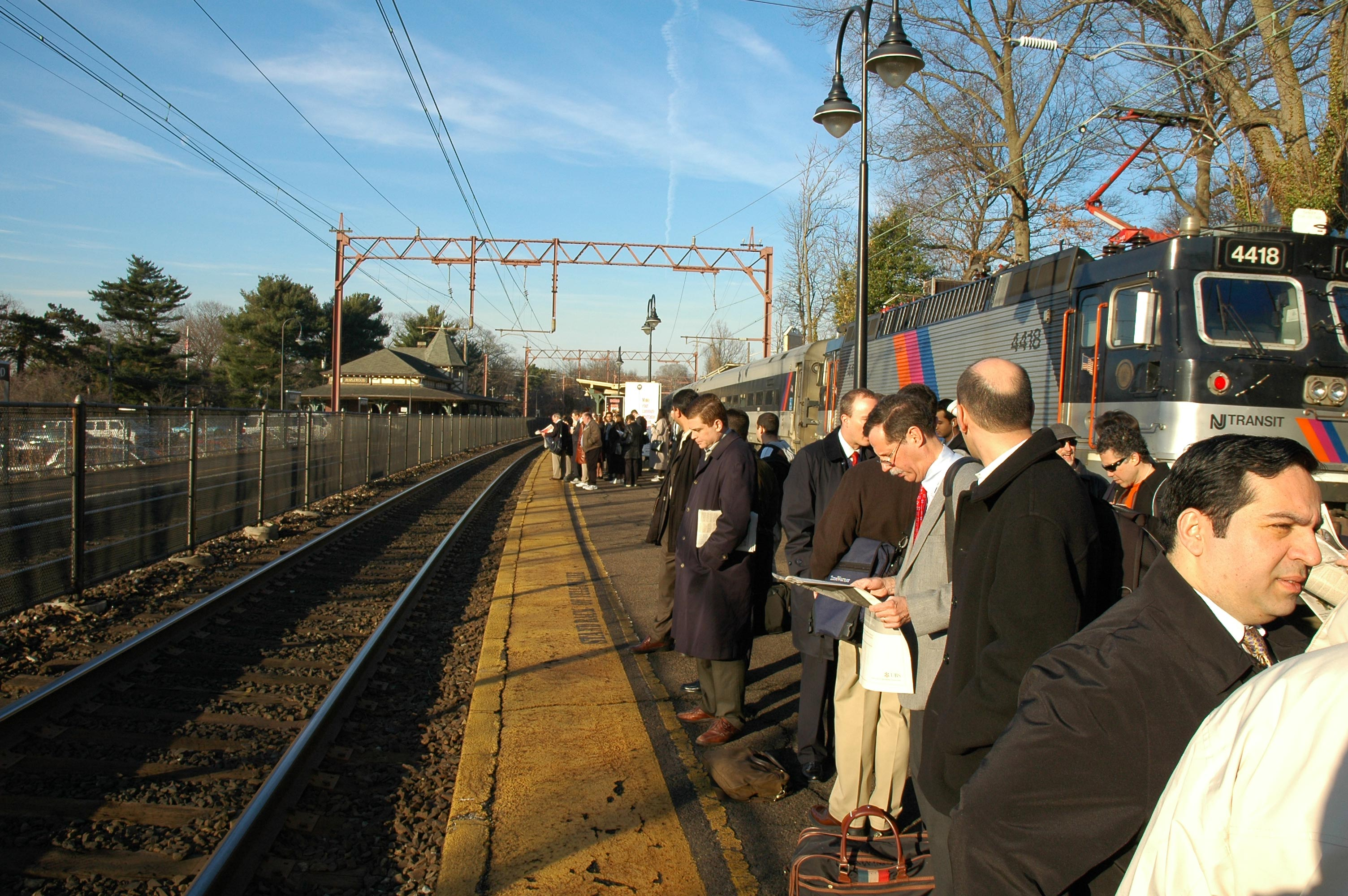
Riders waiting for a train at Maplewood station bound for New York City during the morning rush hour

NJ Transit provides passenger rail service to Maplewood station on the Morristown Line and Gladstone Branch to Newark Broad Street Station, Secaucus Junction and New York Penn Station, with connecting service to Hoboken Terminal.

NJ Transit bus service to Newark on the 25, 31, 37 and 70, and to the Port Authority Bus Terminal in Midtown Manhattan on the 107 route. The township operates the rush-hour Maplewood Jitney service to and from the train station.

== Notable people ==
People who were born in, residents of, or otherwise closely associated with Maplewood include:

- Harriet Adams (1893–1982), author of some 200 books, including nearly 50 in the Nancy Drew series
- Mobolaji Akiode (born 1982), former Nigerian women's professional basketball player
- Jason Alexander (born 1959), actor, best known for his role as George Costanza in Seinfeld
- Amy Arnsten (born 1954), neuroscientist
- Juliette Atkinson (1873–1944), tennis player who won the US Open singles title three times, in addition to seven US Open titles in doubles and three in mixed doubles
- Kathleen Atkinson (1875–1957), tennis player who won two US Open doubles titles together with her sister Juliette
- Shan K. Bagby (born 1967), U.S. Army brigadier general and the 28th Chief of the Army Dental Corps
- Edward Balch (1858–1934), builder and businessman, known as the "Father of Maplewood"
- Dan Barry (born 1958), reporter for The New York Times
- Arthur C. Bartner (born 1940), musician best known as the director of Spirit of Troy, the marching band for the University of Southern California from 1970 to 2020.
- Ahmed Best (born 1973), voice actor who portrayed Jar Jar Binks in the Star Wars film series
- Mark Blum (1950–2020), Obie Award-winning theater actor who also appeared extensively in films and television, including a lead role in the 1985 film Desperately Seeking Susan
- Seth Boyden (1788–1870), inventor
- Zach Braff (born 1975), actor, Scrubs, Garden State
- Marques Brownlee (born 1993), YouTube personality under the name 'MKBHD'
- Norbert Leo Butz (born 1967), actor, and his wife Michelle Federer (born 1973), an actress
- Mya Byrne (born 1978), singer, songwriter and guitarist
- P. J. Byrne (born 1974), film and television actor who has appeared in Horrible Bosses, Final Destination 5 and Wolf of Wall Street, as well as being the voice of Bolin on Nickelodeon's animated TV series The Legend of Korra
- Archie Campbell (1903–1989), Major League Baseball player
- Patricia Charache (1929–2015), physician specializing in infectious disease and microbiology
- Alta Cohen (1908–2003), former professional baseball player who played outfield from 1931 to 1933 with the Brooklyn Robins/Dodgers and Cincinnati Reds
- Claude Coleman Jr. (born 1968), musician who is best known as the drummer for the alternative rock group Ween.
- Lee Crystal (1956–2013), stage name of Lee Sackett, drummer inducted into the Rock and Roll Hall of Fame as a member of Joan Jett and the Blackhearts
- Robert De Grasse (1900–1971), cinematographer
- Paula Dow (born 1955), served from 2010 to 2012 as the 58th Attorney General of New Jersey, appointed by incoming Governor Chris Christie
- Jacqueline Dubrovich (born 1994), Olympic foil fencer, team Olympic gold medal winner
- Asher Brown Durand (1796–1886), painter
- Raymond M. Durkin (1936–2014), politician who served as chairman of the New Jersey Democratic State Committee
- Frederick Eberhardt (1868–1946), engineer, philanthropist, university administrator and president of Gould & Eberhardt
- Christine Ebersole (born 1953), actress and Tony Award winner, is a current resident
- Paul R. Ehrlich (1932–2026), entomologist, professor of population studies and author of The Population Bomb
- Pablo Eisenberg (1932–2022), scholar, social justice advocate and tennis player
- Mike Enoch (born 1977), White Nationalist blogger and podcaster, founder of The Right Stuff Radio
- Bruce Feirstein (born 1956), screenwriter and humorist best known for his contributions to the James Bond series and his best selling humor books, including Real Men Don't Eat Quiche
- Fred Feldman (born 1941), philosopher who specializes in ethical theory.
- David Ferry (1924–2023), poet and translator who won the National Book Award for Poetry in 2012
- Albert Field (1916–2003), archivist known for cataloging and authenticating artwork by the surrealist artist Salvador Dalí
- Christian Fuscarino (born 1990), community organizer, LGBT activist and the Executive Director of Garden State Equality
- Justin Brice Guariglia (born 1974), visual artist and former National Geographic photographer
- Garnet Hall, politician who represented the 28th legislative district in the New Jersey General Assembly from 2024 to 2026
- Jules Heningburg (born 1996), professional lacrosse player on the Redwoods Lacrosse Club of the Premier Lacrosse League and New England Black Wolves of the National Lacrosse League
- Grace Foster Herben (1864–1938), educator and missionary
- R. Graham Huntington (1897–1957), politician who served three terms in the New Jersey General Assembly representing Essex County.
- Mark Jacoby (born 1947), musical theatre performer who has had leading roles on Broadway
- David Javerbaum (born 1971), executive producer of The Daily Show with Jon Stewart
- Amos E. Joel Jr. (1918–2008), electrical engineer who invented a switching device that allowed for the creation of cell phones, among his more than 70 patents
- Benjamin Franklin Jones (1869–1935), Speaker of the New Jersey General Assembly in 1900
- Joe Kinney (born c. 1968), college baseball coach and former outfielder who is the head coach of the Lafayette Leopards baseball team
- Eileen Kraus (1938–2017), business executive who broke the glass ceiling to become the first woman to run a major bank in Connecticut
- Ken Kurson (born 1968), political consultant, writer and journalist, who was editor-in-chief of The New York Observer between 2013 and 2017
- George Ludlow Lee Sr. (1901–1966), chairman of the board of Red Devil, Inc.
- Alan Levin (1926–2006), filmmaker and journalist best known for making documentaries appearing on PBS and HBO
- Marc Levin (born 1951), independent film producer and director, best known for his Brick City TV series
- Leyla McCalla (born 1985), musician
- Gloanna W. MacCarthy (1879–1968), politician who served in the New Jersey General Assembly
- William G. McLoughlin (1922–1992), historian and prominent member of the history department at Brown University from 1954 to 1992
- Cedric McMillan (1977–2022), IFBB professional bodybuilder
- Anisa Mehdi, film director and journalist
- Richard Meier (born 1934), architect whose work includes his design of the Getty Center
- Bea Miller (born 1999), finalist on The X Factor
- Grace Mirabella (1929–2021), fashion journalist who was editor-in-chief of Vogue magazine between 1971 and 1988, after which she founded Mirabella magazine
- Candy Moore (born 1947), actress who began her career appearing on television series as Leave It to Beaver, The Lucy Show and Letter to Loretta
- Paul J. Moore (1868–1938), represented New Jersey's 8th congressional district from 1927 to 1929
- Clayton Morris (born 1976), Fox News Channel co-host
- Ibtihaj Muhammad (born 1985), former sabre fencer and on the U.S. fencing team, best known for being the first Muslim woman to wear a hijab to compete for the U.S. team at the 2016 Summer Olympics
- Yosh Nijman (born 1995), American football offensive tackle for the Green Bay Packers of the National Football League
- Kevin O'Connor (born 1968/1969), television personality who has been the host of the PBS home renovation series This Old House since 2003
- Ellen Pao (born 1970), lawyer and business executive, who was CEO of Reddit
- Kym Ragusa (born 1966), writer and documentary filmmaker
- Zander Rhodes (born 2003), 2020 Women's Junior Foil World Champion, Columbia High School Class of 2021.
- James Ricalton (1844–1929), teacher, photographer and inventor
- Eugene G. Rochow (1909–2002), inorganic chemist who worked on organosilicon chemistry
- Theodore Roosevelt (1858–1919), spent several summers in Maplewood visiting his uncle Cornelius V.S. Roosevelt's home and property, known as The Hickories, covering 100 acres (0.40 km^{2}), an area now partly covered by Roosevelt Road and Kermit Road
- Rotimi (born 1988), actor and singer
- Herb Scherer (1929–2012), professional basketball player who played for the Tri-Cities Blackhawks and New York Knicks
- Frankie Schneider (1926–2018), hall of fame auto racing driver
- Norman Schwarzkopf Sr. (1895–1958), first superintendent of the New Jersey State Police and father of U.S. Army general Norman Schwarzkopf Jr.
- Robert Sheckley (1928–2005), science fiction writer
- Tim Squyres (born 1959), film editor of Crouching Tiger, Hidden Dragon, Hulk, Life of Pi and Syriana, among others
- SZA (born 1989), Neo Soul / R&B artist
- Agnes Sligh Turnbull (1888–1982), novelist and short story author
- Robert Verdi (born 1968), entrepreneur and TV personality, specializing in fashion and home design
- Judith Viorst (born 1931), author and journalist
- George M. Wallhauser (1900–1993), represented New Jersey's 12th congressional district from 1959 to 1965
- Charles V. Webb Jr. (1910–2010), politician who served as prosecutor of Essex County, New Jersey
- George W. Webber (1920–2010), president of the New York Theological Seminary
- Kiely Williams (born 1986), singer / actress from The Cheetah Girls
- Richard Wolin (born 1952), historian
- Teresa Wright (1918–2005), actress

== Sources ==
- League of Women Voters: Maplewood – More than a Train Stop, published privately
- Bates, Helen B. (ed): Maplewood Past and Present – A Miscellany, Maplewood: 1948, Princeton University Press
