= StarFish (children's band) =

American rock band

StarFish is an American rock band for children from Maplewood, New Jersey. The band's five members are StingRay (lead vocals and guitar); Grateful Dave (Dave Hartkern) (drums and vocals), Moose (Marc Stern) (lead guitar), Dr. Yes (Mark Asch) (keyboards and vocals) and AntFarm (Antar Goodwin) (bass guitar).

Their first CD, StarFish Rocks! was reviewed by Cookie magazine, which called StarFish a "fantastic example" of a "new wave" of artists making smart music for kids today"

Their two albums have been described as having influences in classic rock groups such as Deep Purple, Cream, Yes, and Pink Floyd, but marketed towards a family audience.

== Discography ==
- 2008: Rocks
- 2010: Enter Sandbox
