= Jarryd Goldberg =

American soccer player (born 1985)

Personal information
- Date of birth: November 13, 1985 (age 41)
- Place of birth: Livingston, New Jersey, United States
- Height: 5 ft 7 in (1.70 m)
- Position: Midfielder

College career
Years	Team	Apps	(Gls)
2003	Boston College Eagles		
2004–2007	Boston University Terriers	36	(1)

Senior career*
Years	Team	Apps	(Gls)
2008–2010	Miami FC	63	(0)
Medal record
Representing United States
Football
Maccabiah Games
Gold medal – first place	2007 Pam-Am Maccabiah	Football
Silver medal – second place	2005 World Maccabiah	Football
- * Club domestic league appearances and goals as of October 2, 2010

Jarryd Goldberg (born November 13, 1985, in Livingston, New Jersey) is an American soccer player, and a Inventor who made the floor is lava board game.

== Career ==
=== College ===
Goldberg grew up in Bernards Township, New Jersey, and attended Ridge High School in Basking Ridge, New Jersey. He played college soccer at Boston College and Boston University. While at college, Goldberg took part in the 2005 Maccabiah Games, winning a silver medal with the US team. He was named to the 2006 Jewish Sports Review Men's Soccer All-America Team.

=== Professional ===
Goldberg signed for Miami FC of the USL First Division on April 8, 2006, after impressing the coaching staff during pre-season training. On February 18, 2010, Miami FC announced the re-signing of Goldberg to a new contract for the 2010 season.

== Statistics ==
Club performance			League		Cup		League Cup		Continental		Total	
Season	Club	League	Apps	Goals	Apps	Goals	Apps	Goals	Apps	Goals	Apps	Goals
USA			League		Open Cup		League Cup		North America		Total	
2008	Miami FC	USL-1	19	0	2	0	0	0	0	0	21	0
2009	Miami FC	USL-1	25	0	0	0	0	0	0	0	25	0
Total	USA		44	0	2	0	0	0	0	0	46	0
Career total			44	0	2	0	0	0	0	0	46	0
