= Makeba (crater) =

Crater on Mercury

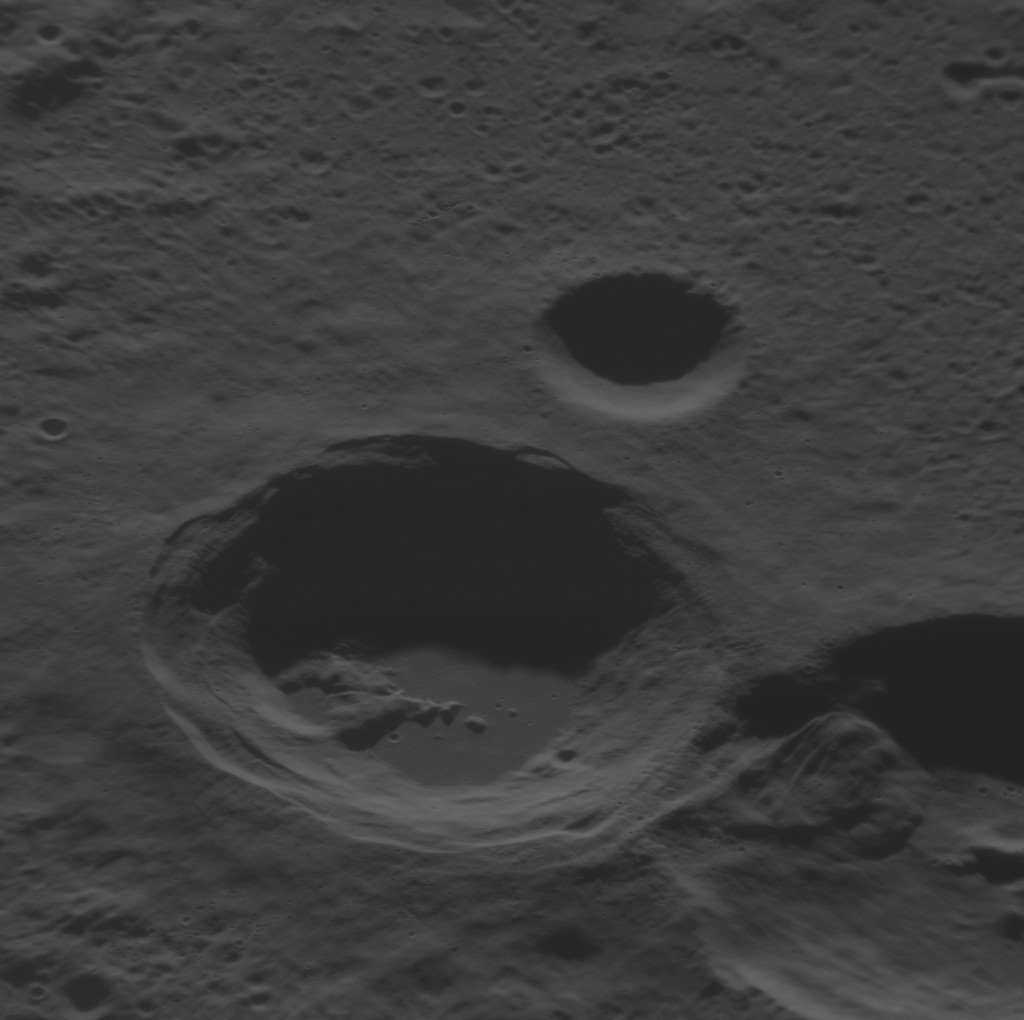
- MESSENGER NAC
- Planet: Mercury
- Coordinates: 14.22°N 1.41°W
- Quadrangle: Kuiper
- Diameter: 26 km (16 mi)
- Eponym: Miriam Makeba

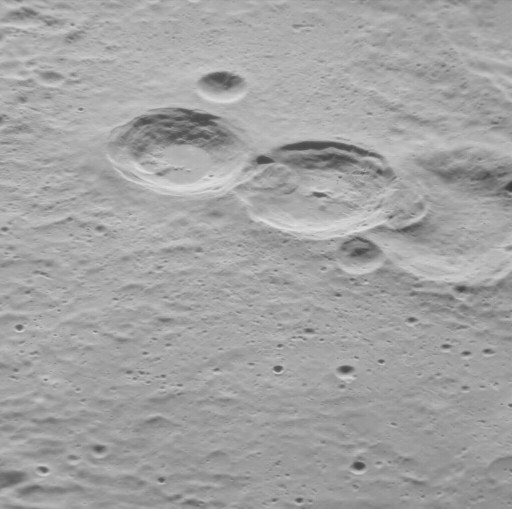
Another view at a higher sun angle

Makeba is a crater on Mercury. Its name was adopted by the International Astronomical Union (IAU) on August 13, 2024, for the South African singer-songwriter, Miriam Makeba, who lived from 1932 to 2008.

Makeba is to the southeast of the crater Hemingway.
