= George Ludlow Lee Sr. =

American businessman (1901–1966)

- Born: March 25, 1901
- Died: August 8, 1966 (aged 65); Portland, Maine
- Occupations: chairman of Red Devil, Inc.

George Ludlow Lee Sr. (March 25, 1901 - August 8, 1966) was chairman of the board of Red Devil, Inc.

== Biography ==
He was born on March 25, 1901. He married Dulcinea Harrison Smith. He had four children, George Ludlow Lee Jr., John Landon Lee, Dulcinea Harrison Lee, and Robert Todd Lee. He became chairman of the board of Red Devil and his son, George Ludlow Lee Jr. took over as president and CEO. He died on August 9, 1966.

== George Ludlow Lee Sr. in Bernards Township, New Jersey ==
Mr. Lee was owner/treasurer of the Red Devil Tool Company of Irvington, New Jersey from 1937 to 1950. He later became chairman of the board, renamed the company Red Devil, Inc.. The company is now based in Tulsa, Oklahoma and is currently run by grandson CEO William (Bill) S. Lee. He is the 4th generation to lead the company. George was also an avid philatelist.

Mr. George L. Lee, Sr., his wife Dulciena Harrison Smith Lee, and his children George L. Lee, Jr., John Landon Lee, Dulcinea Harrison Lee, and Robert Todd Lee were from Maplewood, New Jersey. The family moved into the Cedar Hill Farm estate in Basking Ridge, NJ on the week of June 4, 1940. Mr. Lee served on the Bernards Township Planning Board and was its Vice Chairman in 1944. He and his wife, Dulcinea Harrison Smith Lee, continued operation of the flourishing fruit farm, where local markets and roadside stands were supplied with the produce.

The Lee's felt that the taxes in Bernards Township were becoming outrageous, so in 1946, the Lee's moved to a bigger home called Dunleigh on the Bernardsville Mountain. The home was on Mine Mount Rd. and owned by William Stamps. The Lee's then sold Cedar Hill to the Bissell's in 1946.

Lee had held on to many parcels of land around the Cedar Hill Farm. He chose to break up the land into various sections. In the mid-50s, Lee donated 60 acres of land to Bernards Township Board of Education to build both Cedar Hill School (Opened Oct. 27,1957) and Ridge High School with their associated athletic fields. He also donated the property to the Township where the War Memorial Park stands today.

== Ridge High School and the Red Devils ==
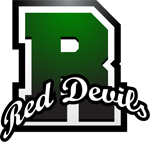
Ridge Red Devils

Locals know the name Lee as the Ridge High School field was named after him as well as the high school mascot, the “Red Devil”. While the Red Devils are named after George Lee's company, the color is green because rival Bernardsville had red uniforms, so they chose green.

The Red Devil Company was originally founded as Smith & Hemenway Company, Inc. While the founder, George Lee Sr.'s father-in-law Landon P. Smith, was on a trip to Sweden he heard a blacksmith remark “those little red devils” after sparks from a forge singed his arm. The name stuck in Smith's mind and upon his return to the States he began to label many of the tools he sold with the RED DEVIL® trade name.
