= Edward Balch =

New Jersey builder

Edward Crawford Balch (July 17, 1858 – February 8, 1934) was a builder and businessman. He built around 175 houses in Maplewood, New Jersey, and became known as the Father of Maplewood. He also owned 1) a women's clothing business. 2) Orange Screen Company, a manufacturing business. 3) John O'Rourke, a lumber and coal business. He married Kate McKinney on March 20, 1879. They had three sons (Edward Jr., Harry, Everett) and two daughters (Ida, Florence).

The Maplewood Country Club was formed at a meeting held inside his home on Ridgewood Road in 1903.

== Sources ==
- Myers, William Starr (2000). Prominent Families of New Jersey: Volume 1. Baltimore, Maryland: Clearfield. pp. 325–326. ISBN 9780806350363.
