= John Francis Hemenway =

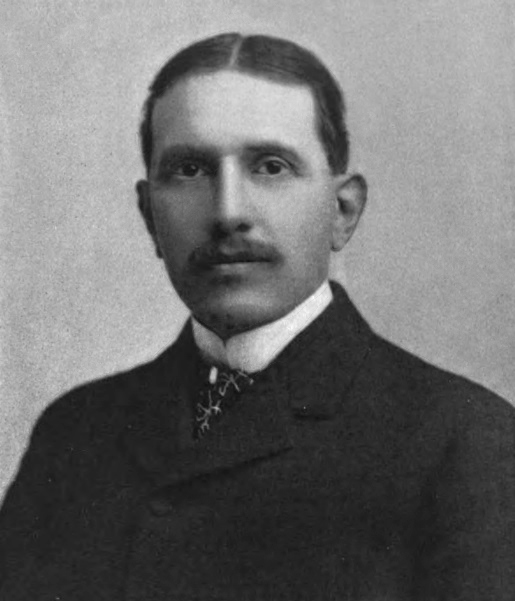
- Born: 1856 or 1857; Amber, Onondaga County, New York
- Died: January 1, 1926 (aged 69); New York, New York
- Spouse: Alice Montague (m. 1891)

Signature
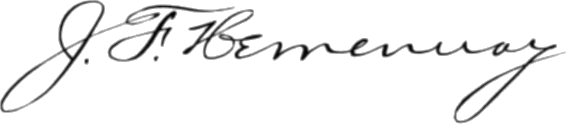

John Francis Hemenway (1856/1857 – January 1, 1926) was the founder of the Smith & Hemenway tool company.

== Biography ==
John Francis Hemenway was born in Amber, Onondaga County, New York, the son of Lucy Francis and Seneca C. Hemenway.

He married Alice Montague on April 23, 1891.

He and Landon P. Smith organized the Smith & Hemenway Company. They bought the Maltby-Henley Company, the Bindley Automatic Wrench Company, Smith & Patterson, and the Windsor Hardware Corporation.

In 1925, ownership of the company was in dispute. He retired that year, and Landon P. Smith bought his shares in the company.

He died from a heart attack in New York on January 1, 1926.
