= Hemingway (crater) =

Crater on Mercury

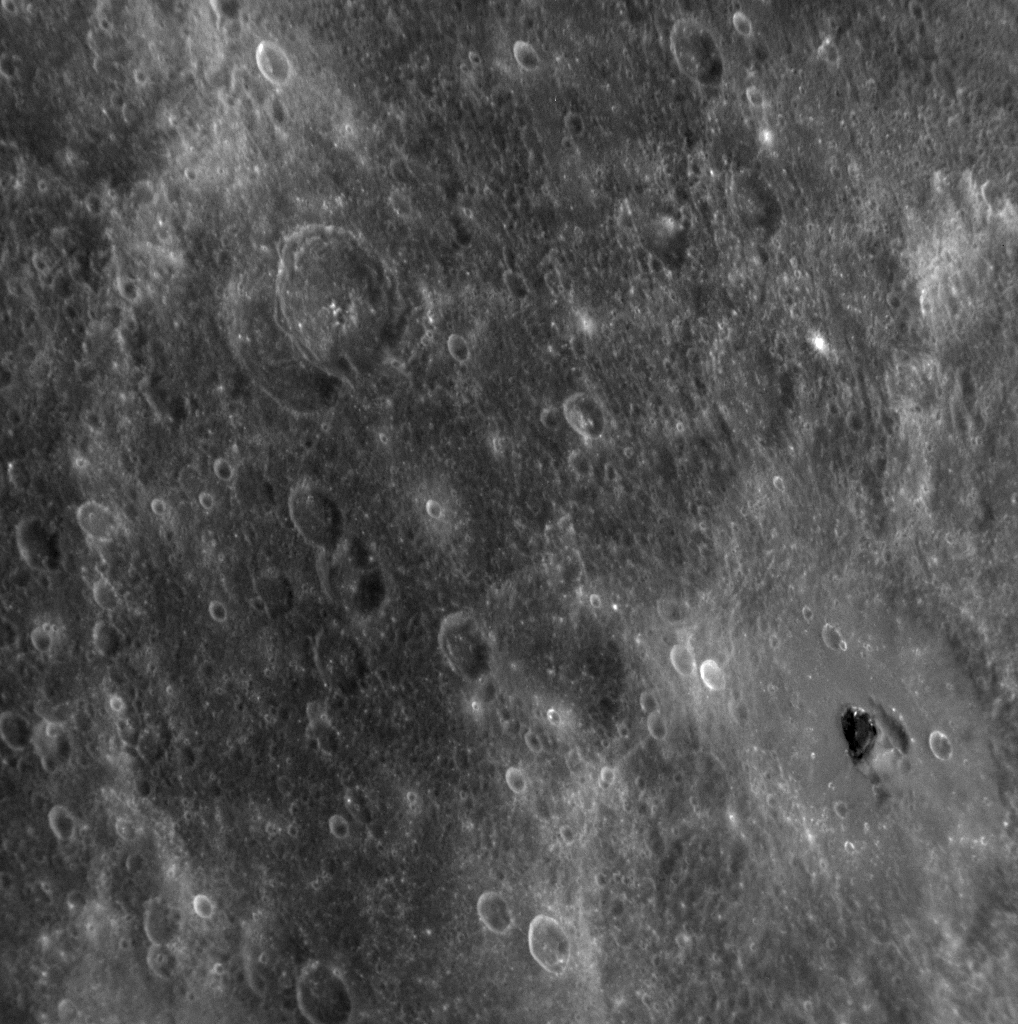
- Hemingway is in the lower right corner of this MESSENGER image, from its second flyby in October 2008
- Feature type: Impact crater
- Location: Kuiper quadrangle, Mercury
- Coordinates: 17.5°N 2.9°W
- Diameter: 126 km (78 mi)
- Eponym: Ernest Hemingway

Hemingway is a crater on Mercury. It has a patch of very dark material located near its center. The dark color is likely due to rocks that have a different mineralogical composition from that of the surrounding surface.

The crater's name was adopted by the International Astronomical Union (IAU) in 2009. It is named for the American author Ernest Hemingway.

The small crater Makeba is southeast of Hemingway.

== Dark interior crater ==
The dark depression near the center of Hemingway is truly black, and due to its superposition over the other structures in the crater, it is a young feature. The dark material is probably abundant in the subsurface of the crater and is being exposed by mass wasting processes and the formation of hollows. The irregular depression itself may have formed by explosive volcanism. There is an unnamed crater to the southeast of Hemingway that may also be the site of explosive volcanism.

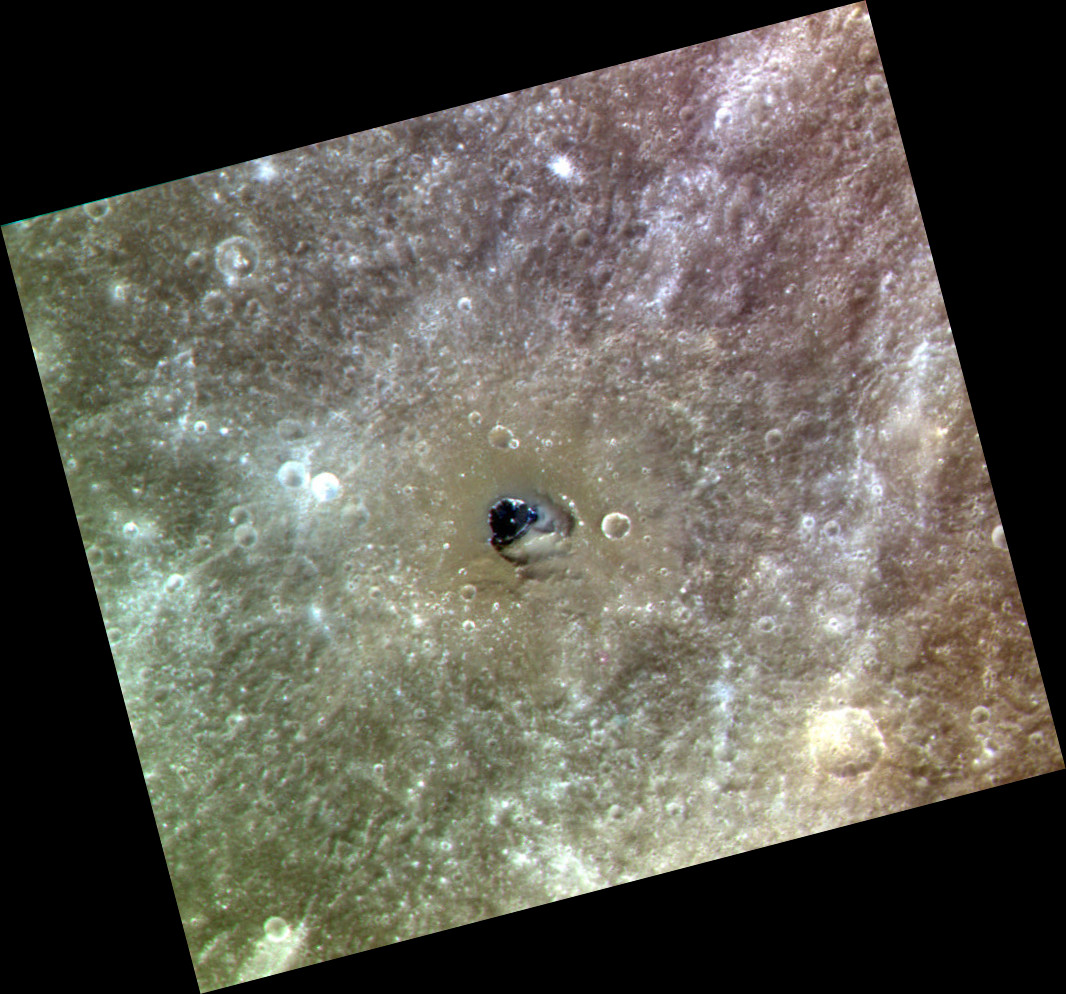
Approximate color view

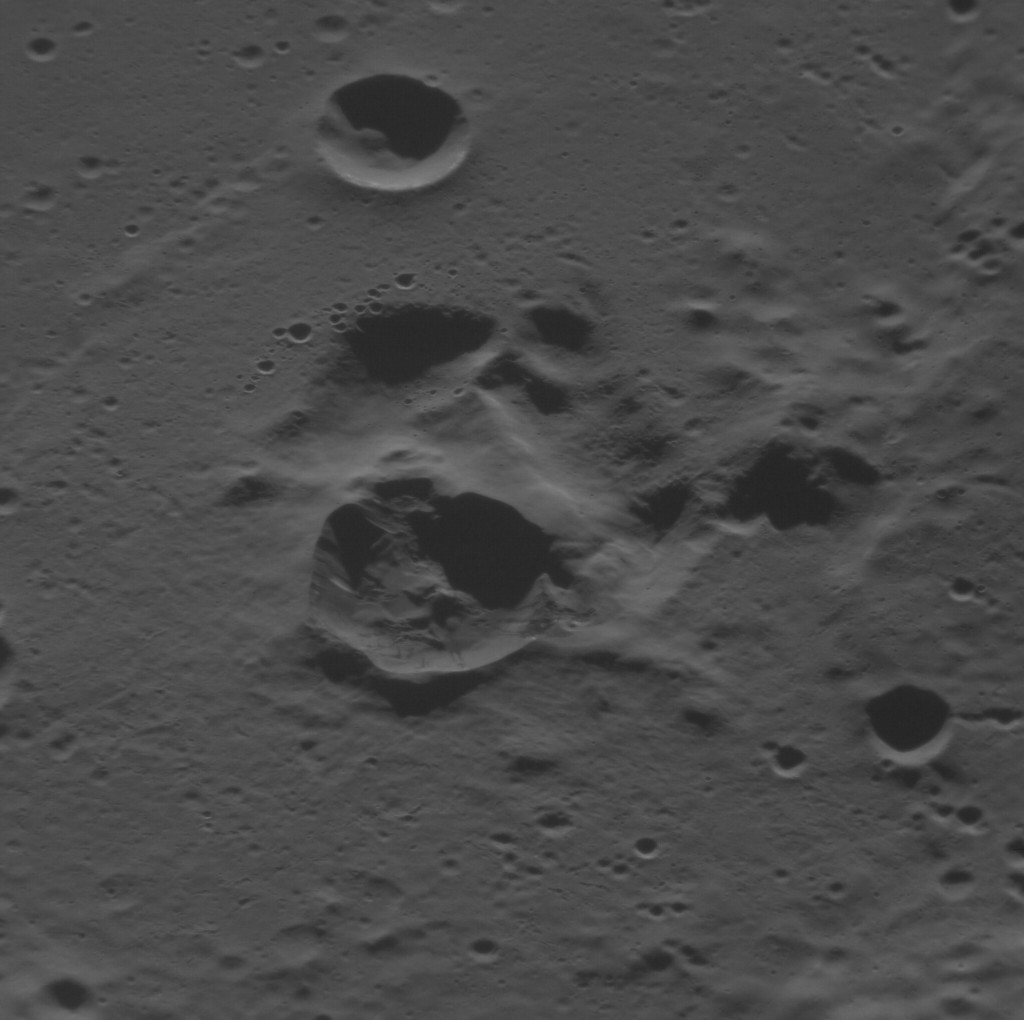
Oblique view facing east with the dark interior crater near center, showing that the dark crater is adjacent to a complex depression

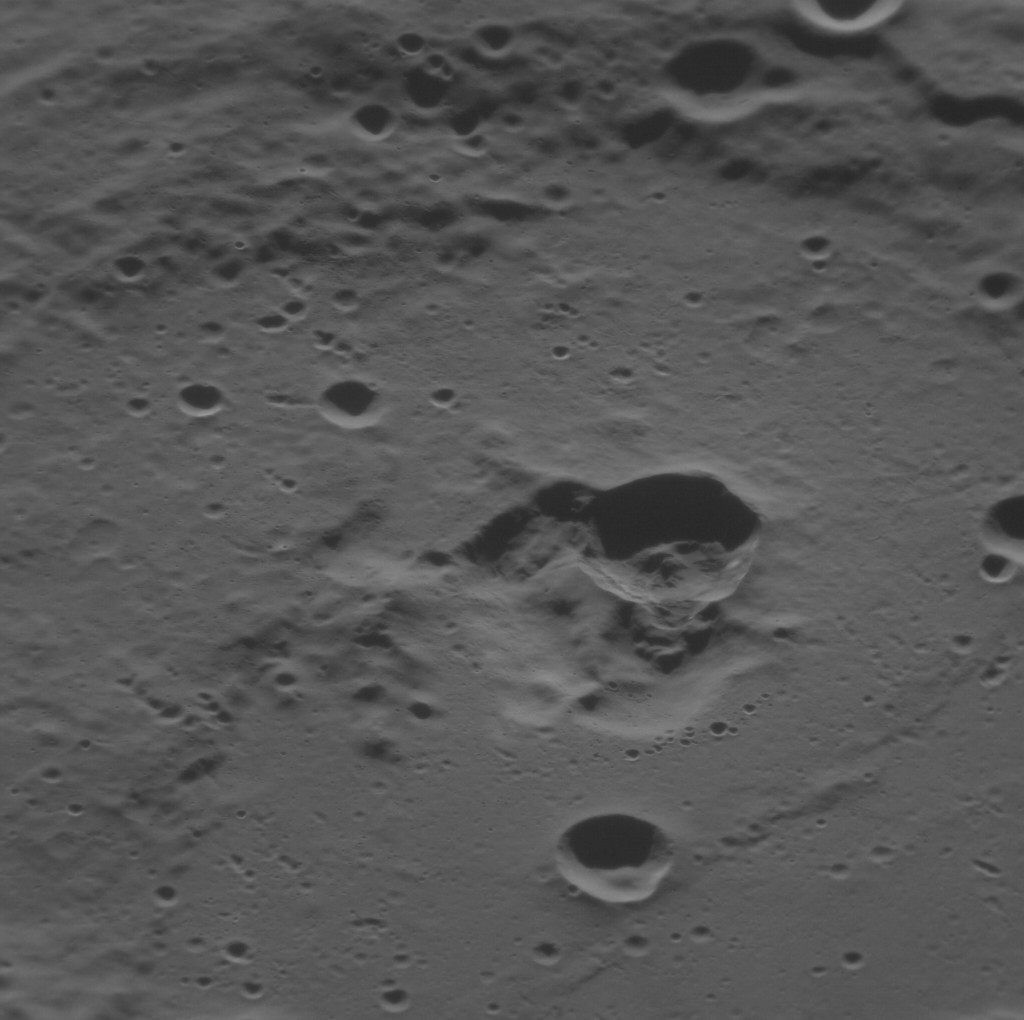
Oblique view facing west with the dark interior crater near center
