= Hemingway's =

Vermont restaurant

Coordinates: 43°38′54″N 72°46′13″W

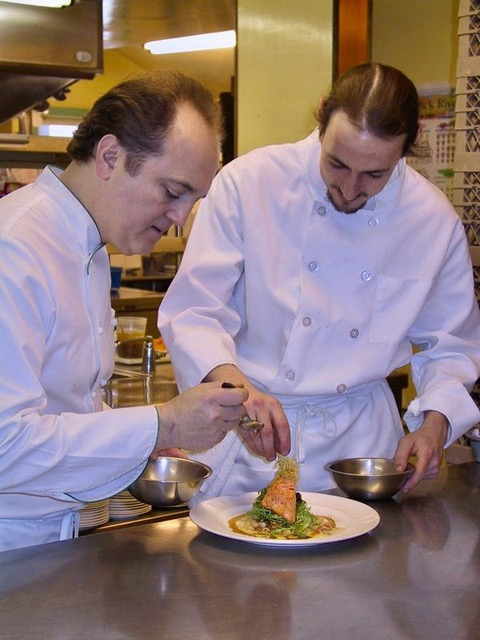
Chef Theodore Fondulas (left) prepares a dish with a helper at Hemingway's restaurant

Hemingway's was a restaurant in Killington, Vermont that pioneered gourmet farm-to-table cuisine, paired with fine wines, in a rural Vermont setting, modeled after such restaurants in the French countryside. Owners, Theodore and Linda Fondulas, opened the restaurant in 1982. The restaurant became increasingly written about in food and wine magazines until, in 1992, it was declared one of the top 25 restaurants in the country by Food & Wine magazine. Thereafter, it remained on lists of top American restaurants until it closed in 2011.

== History ==
After an extended trip to Europe engendered the Fondulases' interest in food and wine, they began careers in the restaurant industry in New York, California and New England. In 1982, they purchased a former French restaurant in Killington, which they opened as Hemingway's with Theodore as the chef. The building was a former coach stop from the 1860s.

The restaurant featured three dining rooms: a stone-walled wine cellar, a brick-walled garden room, and a vaulted space. The cuisine featured fresh farm-to-table ingredients, foraged mushrooms, and other delicacies, including pheasant and venison.

Julia Child speaking before the Vermont Culinary Institute in 1984 inspired the Fondulases to develop a wine program for their dining customers. Child had co-founded the American Institute of Wine & Food; with the establishment of the Vermont chapter of the institute, both Fondulases were appointed to the chapter's board. Child would dine at the restaurant when her birthday coincided with visits to relatives in nearby Woodstock, Vermont. In 1988, noted British Master of Wine, Clive Coates, enjoyed select tastings of the 36 vintages of Latour from the restaurant's wine cellar as part of a multi-day event held in his honor.

The restaurant closed in 2011, following the economic downturn in 2008, because of flooding from Tropical Storm Irene, which damaged much of the property. Having been sold several times since, the building has been converted into apartments. Since the restaurant's closure, the Fondulases became active in a business that sources farm-to-table products.

== Recognition ==
Hemingway's gained recognition over time, as the Fondulases evolved its offerings. In the 1980s, the restaurant's pairings of wine and food received recognition from Nation's Restaurant News, Wine Spectator magazine, and various trade magazines. From the 1990s onward, it was receiving recognition as one of the top restaurants in the United States from such publications as Food & Wine magazine, Esquire, Bon Appétit, The New York Times, Travel + Leisure, Nation's Restaurant News, Condé Nast Traveler, The Burlington Free Press, and Robert Mondavi. Additionally, the restaurant's special-diet menus were cited in the Vegetarian Times and Sully's Living Without.
