= Hemenway Furniture Co. Building =

- U.S. National Register of Historic Places
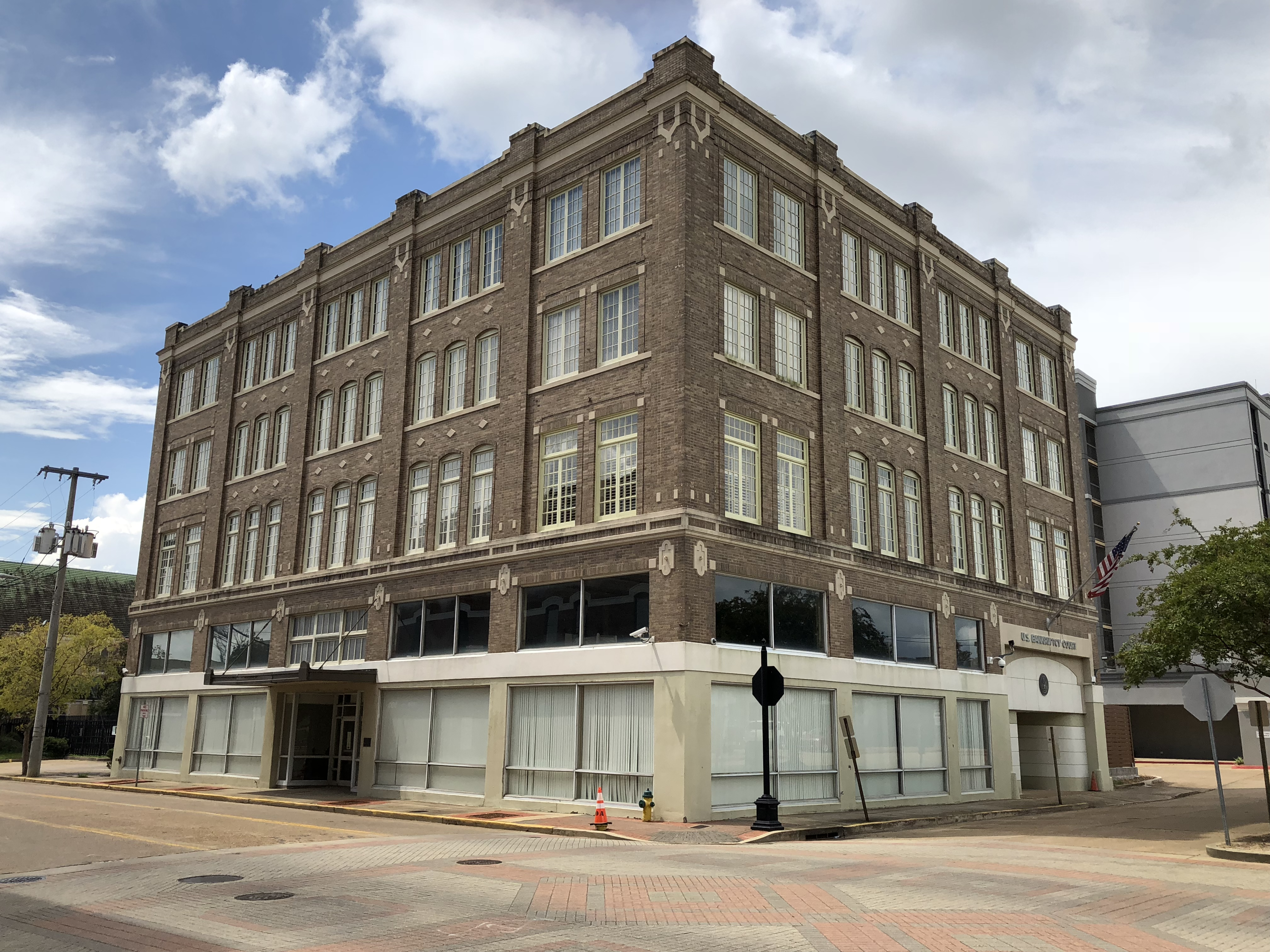

- Location within Louisiana Location within the United States
- Location: 3rd and Jackson Sts., Alexandria, Louisiana
- Coordinates: 31°18′44″N 92°26′46″W
- Area: 0.5 acres (0.20 ha)
- Built: c.1918
- Architectural style: Chicago
- NRHP reference No.: 83003632
- Added to NRHP: October 4, 1983

Hemenway Furniture Co. Building is located in the central business district of Alexandria, Louisiana. It was added to the National Register of Historic Places in 1983.

Built around 1918, it is a five-story brown brick commercial building. It has terra cotta trim at the top of its second story, in the entablature near the top of the building, and at the tops of pilasters at the top.

It was deemed notable for its architecture, which stylistically is "a late somewhat diluted version of the Chicago Style skyscraper, although it lacks the pronounced cornice characteristic of that style.

Located at 300 Jackson Street, Alexandria, Louisiana, the building was later in use by the United States Bankruptcy Court, Western District of Louisiana.
