= Hemingway special =

Rum-based cocktail

Hemingway Special
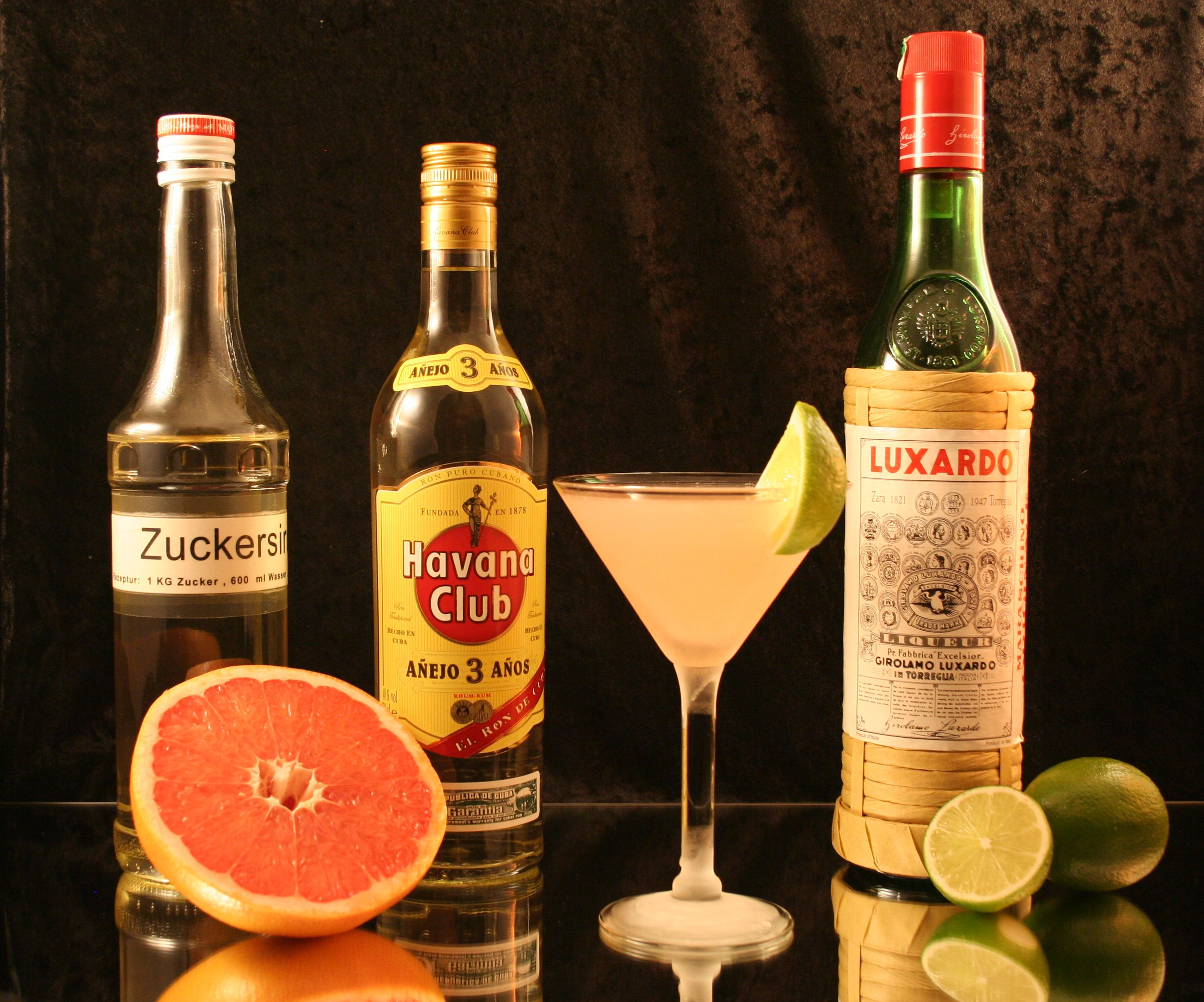
- A Hemingway Special or Hemingway Daiquiri and its component ingredients
- Type: Mixed drink
- Ingredients: 6 cl (12 parts) Rum; 4 cl (8 parts) grapefruit juice; 1.5 cl (3 parts) Maraschino liqueur; 1.5 cl (3 parts) fresh lime juice
- Base spirit: Rum
- Standard drinkware: Cocktail glass
- Served: Straight up: chilled, without ice
- Preparation: Pour all ingredients into a shaker with ice. Shake.

A Hemingway special is an all day cocktail based on the Floridita daiquiri. It is recognised as an IBA official cocktail by the IBA. The Hemingway Special is made with rum, lime juice, maraschino liqueur, and grapefruit juice, and served in a cocktail glass.

== History ==
Ernest Hemingway, who stayed in Cuba, tried the Floridita's signature drink, the Floridita daiquiri, and said "That's good, but I prefer it without sugar and double rum." This became a cocktail now known as the Hemingway daiquiri or the Papa Doble. His recipe was later modified further, adding grapefruit juice to the mix, at which point the drink was dubbed the "Hemingway special".

== See also ==
- List of cocktails
- IBA Official Cocktail
