= Red Devil, Inc. =

- Founder: Landon P. Smith; John Francis Hemenway
- Defunct: 1897

Red Devil is a manufacturer of caulking, glazing, sealants and related surface preparation tools for glaziers, painters and masons. They are a privately owned family business with manufacturing facilities in Pryor, Oklahoma. The company is currently headquartered in Pryor, Oklahoma.

== History ==
The company was founded as Smith & Hemenway Company, in 1872 by Landon P. Smith and John Francis Hemenway in Hill, New Hampshire. The company manufactured the "Woodward Wizard", patented by Frank R. Woodward in 1875, for cutting glass. During a trip to Sweden, Smith heard a blacksmith call sparks "those little red devils" and he named the tool after that phrase.

In 1926 Landon P. Smith bought John Francis Hemenway's shares in the company and Hemenway retired. In 1932, general manager George Ludlow Lee, Sr. acquired Vesco Tools Company's line of wood scrapers. In the 1950s George Ludlow Lee, Sr. became chairman of the board. In 1963 George Ludlow Lee, Jr. acquired Schalk Chemical Company adding adhesives and cleaners to the companies product line.
