= Carly Schroeder =

Former American actress

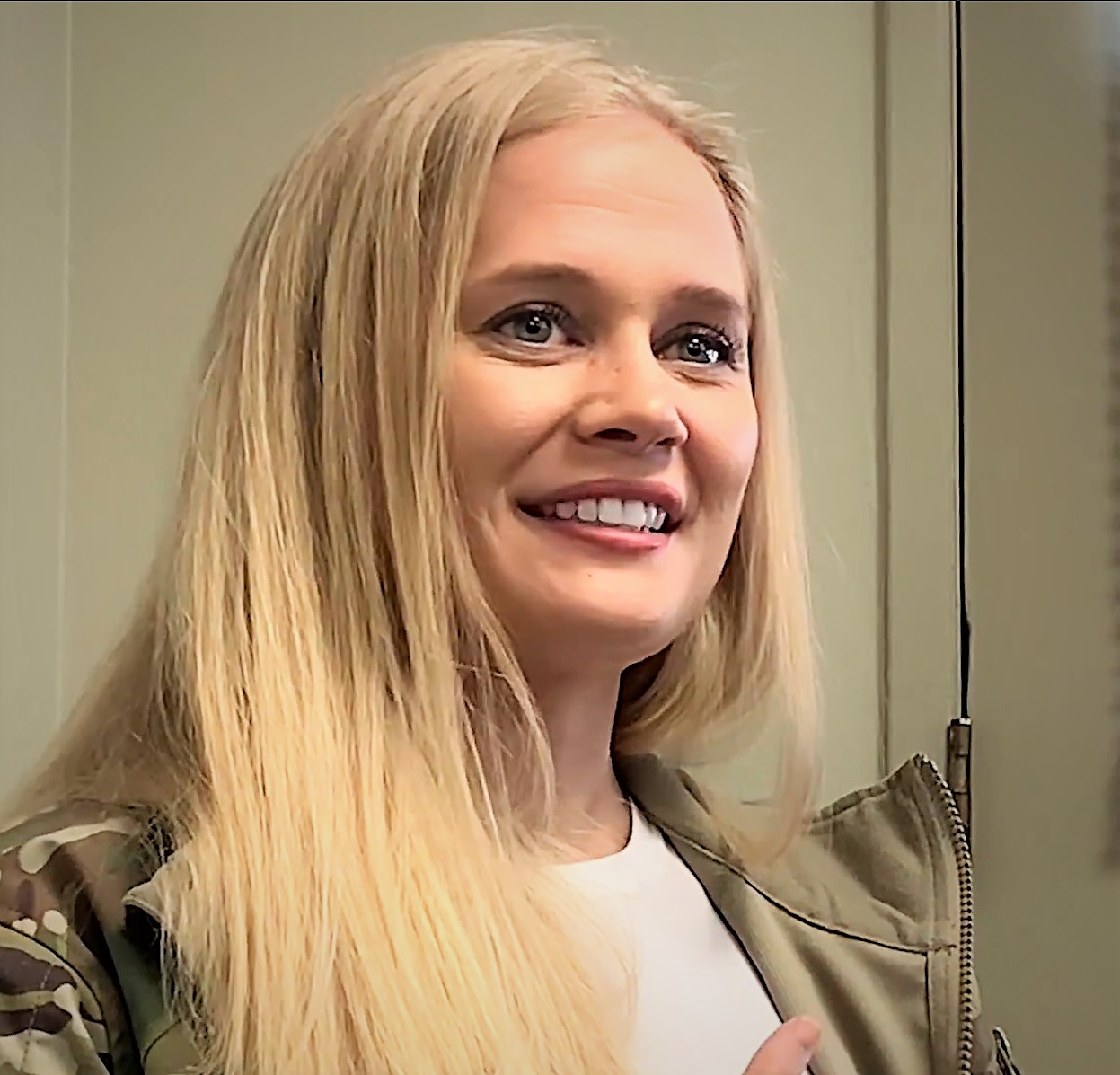
- Schroeder in July 2019
- Occupations: Actress, soldier
- Years active: 1995–2018
- Military career
- Allegiance: United States
- Branch: United States Army
- Service years: 2019–present
- Rank: Captain
- Units: 2nd Battalion, 7th Infantry Regiment, 3rd Infantry Division

Signature
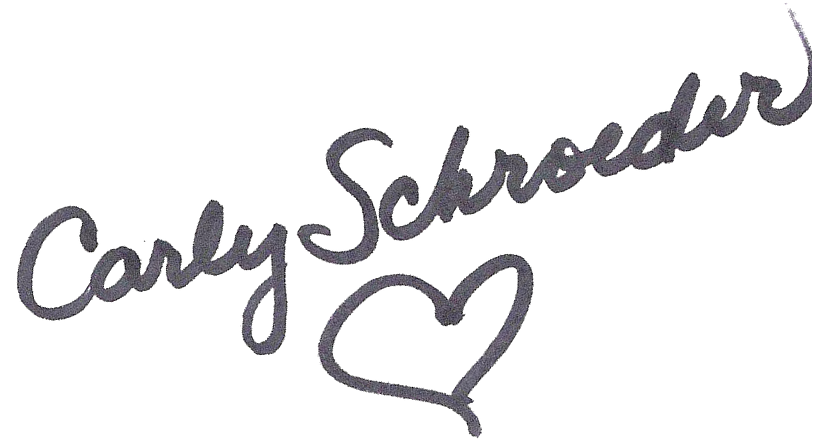

Carly Schroeder is an American former actress and U.S. Army officer. She is best known for playing Serena Baldwin, the daughter of Scotty Baldwin and Lucy Coe in the General Hospital spin-off Port Charles. She also had a recurring role on the Disney Channel's Lizzie McGuire. In 2007, she played the lead in Gracie, a film inspired by a real-life tragedy during the childhood of sibling actors Elisabeth and Andrew Shue.

In February 2019, Schroeder announced that she would be joining the United States Army.

== Career ==
=== Acting ===
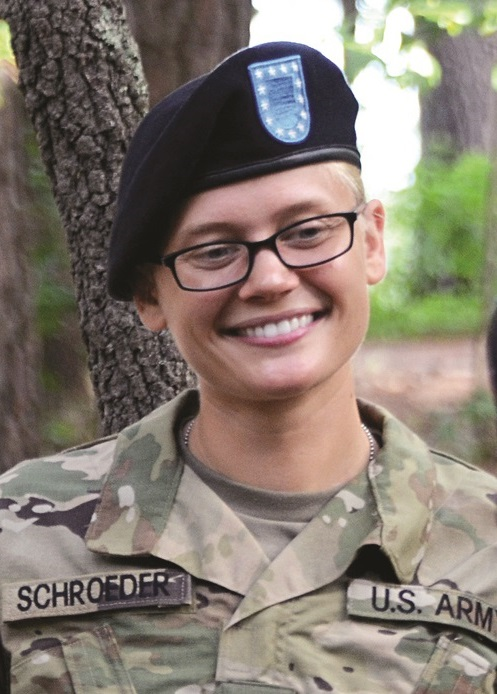
Schroeder graduating Basic Combat Training at Fort Jackson (South Carolina) in 2019

In 1997, American Broadcasting Company (ABC) hired Schroeder to play Serena Baldwin on Port Charles. She was twice nominated for a Young Artist Award for her work on the show; once in 1999 and again in 2000, as well as a Young Star Award nomination in 1999 for Best Performance by a Young Actress in a Daytime TV Program. Schroeder then appeared as Melina Bianco in The Disney Channel's Lizzie McGuire. Originally booked as a one-time appearance, she shot twelve episodes of the show and also appeared in The Lizzie McGuire Movie in 2003, in the same role.

In 2003, Schroeder auditioned for her first feature film and won the role of Millie in the thriller Mean Creek. The movie won wide acclaim for Schroeder and the rest of the cast, winning the Humanitas Prize at the 2004 Sundance Film Festival, and also being awarded the 2005 Independent Spirit Festival Special Distinction Award for best ensemble cast.

Gracie was Shroeder's next film role, in 2006. In order to win the role, she began an intense three-month work-out that included a daily regimen of not only physical fitness, but also of training in advanced soccer skills with professional athletes and trainers. While Gracie was in theaters, Schroeder's other movie, Eye of the Dolphin, was receiving attention, winning two awards from the 2007 International Family Film Festival: a Best Child Actor win for Schroeder, and a Drama Feature win for the movie. The movie has been well received and continues to receive honors, including being named as an Official Selection for the Tribeca Film Festival, Delray Beach Film Festival, Kids First! Film Festival, Tiburon Film Festival, USA Family Film Festival and the Worldfest Houston Film festival. At the 2007 Kids First Awards in October, Schroeder received the award for Best Emerging Actress, while the film received the Best Feature Award (ages 12–18). Her other movies are Forget Me Not (2009), and Slightly Single in L.A., which completed filming in 2009 and was released in 2012. She was also featured in Creepers (2011) and Prep School (2015).

In early July 2017, it was announced that Schroeder would return as Serena Baldwin to General Hospital to honor the late Peter Hansen, who had died in April 2017, who had portrayed her grandfather, Lee Baldwin.

=== Military ===
In February 2019, Schroeder announced that she would be joining the United States Army. She attended Officer Candidate School, graduating with a commission as a second lieutenant on September 20, 2019. Schroeder served as an infantry officer with the rank of captain and was assigned to the 2nd Battalion, 7th Infantry Regiment of the 3rd Infantry Division.

On October 9, 2026, she announced she had left active service after receiving her DD-214.

== Filmography ==
=== Film ===
Year	Title	Role	Notes	Ref.
1998	Babe: Pig in the City	Additional voices		
1999	Toy Story 2	Additional voices		
2003	The Lizzie McGuire Movie	Melina Bianco		
2004	Mean Creek	Millie		
2005	We All Fall Down	Charity		
2006	Firewall	Sarah Stanfield		
2007	Gracie	Gracie Bowen		
2007	Prey	Jessica Newman		
2007	Eye of the Dolphin	Alyssa		
2009	Forget Me Not	Sandy Channing		
2011	Rites of Passage	Carly		
2012	Slightly Single in L.A.	Becca		
2015	Prep School	Kyra Matheson	Best Actress in a Dramatic Feature, 2015 Studio City International Film Festival	
2017	One of Us	Venus		
2018	Ouija House	Laurie		

=== Television ===
Year	Title	Role	Notes	Ref.
1997–2003	Port Charles	Serena Baldwin	Contract role	
1997–2001, 2017	General Hospital	Serena Baldwin	Recurring role	
2000	Growing Up Brady	Susan Olsen	Television film	(Note: Based on the autobiography written by actor Barry Williams with Chris Kreski and a foreword by Robert Reed.)
2000	Dawson's Creek	Molly Sey	Episodes: "A Family Way", "The Unusual Suspects"	
2001	Virtually Casey	Jennifer Collins	Television film directed by Ellen Gittelsohn	
2001–2003	Lizzie McGuire	Melina Bianco	Recurring role	
2002	George Lopez	Ashley	Episode: "Token of Unappreciation"	
2003	Cold Case	Brandi Beaudry	Episode: "The Sleepover"	
2008	Ghost Whisperer	Lisa Benton	Episode: "Home But Not Alone"	
2008	Prayers for Bobby	Joy Griffith	Television film (Lifetime)	
2009	Law & Order: Special Victims Unit	Kim Garnet	Episode: "Crush"	
2018	Deadly Shores	Anna	Television film (Lifetime)	

== Awards ==
- Special Distinction Award at Independent Spirit Awards for Mean Creek (2004)
- Best Child Actor Award at Int. Family Film Festival for Eye of the Dolphin (2007)
- Best Emerging Actress at 2007 Kids First! Awards for Eye of the Dolphin
- Best Actress at 2015 Studio City Film Festival for Prep School

== Military awards ==
Parachutist Badge

National Defense Service Medal

== Notes ==
First	Serena Baldwin (role); 1997–2003; 2017	Succeeded by Kelly Kruger
