= Rashid Gatrad =

Malawi-born consultant paediatrician

- Born: 1946
- Occupation: Consultant
- Awards: Officer of the Order of the British Empire (2002 New Year Honours, 2001); Fellow of the Royal College of Physicians; National Clinical Impact Award; Fellow of the Royal College of Paediatrics and Child Health (honorary fellow)
- Website: www.professorgatrad.com
- Position held: Deputy Lieutenant (2014–)

Abdul Rashid Gatrad (born 1946) is a Malawi-born consultant paediatrician of Memon heritage, working in England.

== Early life ==
Gatrad was born in Blantyre, Malawi in 1946. His father Mahomed Gatrad was a leader of the Asian community in Malawi and his family were Memon.

He was educated at a Gujarati school in Malawi, and then Founders High School in Bulawayo, Rhodesia.

While in Malawi he played cricket for the national side, against Mashonaland and Matabeleland, and in Bulawayo he played for his school. He was a seam bowler and slip fielder.

Moving to England, he took A levels at Harrow College then studied medicine at the University of Leeds from 1966. During this time he also worked as a postman. He undertook training at Pinderfields Hospital, Wakefield, and subsequently at the Royal Manchester Children's Hospital and Saint Mary's Hospital in the same city.

== Career ==
Gatrad began working for the NHS on 1 August 1971. In 2018 he recalled:

I experienced a lot of racial discrimination in those early years... It still saddens me now when I think back to the attitudes and behaviours of some people. They made it very clear my face didn't fit... I recall one colleague in particular who constantly belittled me and bullied me – in front of others. But I made up my mind I would not be a victim and told her very clearly that I would report her to the GMC and would not tolerate her speaking to me in that way. The bullying stopped and I am so pleased that I stood up to her.

He transferred Walsall in 1983. As well as becoming a consultant paediatrician and head of the Paediatrics Department at Walsall Manor Hospital, he is Professor of Paediatrics and Child Health at the University of Kentucky and at the University of Wolverhampton.

He completed his PhD in 1994, at the University of Wolverhampton, while working full-time as a physician, with a thesis entitled "The Muslim in hospital, school and the community: practitioner awareness of the Muslim way of life in Walsall, West Midlands, United Kingdom".

He has published over 80 academic papers; in addition to paediatric matters, these cover topics including medical issues related to the Hajj, palliative care for people of various South Asian ethnicities, birth customs associated with South Asian ethnicities, and multifaith hospital chaplaincy. He is the co-author of two medical books: Caring for Muslim Patients, which has a foreword by Prince Charles, and Palliative Care for South Asians: Muslims, Hindus, and Sikhs, whose foreword is by Liam Donaldson.

He appeared several times on the BBC Television programme Gharbar, answering questions on medical issues.

He is a postgraduate examiner for the Royal College of Paediatrics and Child Health.

=== Charitable work ===
After arriving in Walsall, Gatrad worked to raise funds to construct the first purpose-built Mosque in the town, Masjid-Al-Farouq

He is chief executive, and a trustee of the Midland International Aid Trust, a charity registered in England and Wales. He is the founder of Walsall Against Single Use plastic (WASUP), which is being expanded as World Against Single Use plastic.

He created the Jubaida Gatrad Maternity & Children's Hospital, named after his mother, in Gujarat.

== Recognition ==
Gatrad was appointed an Officer of the Order of the British Empire (OBE) in the 2002 New Year Honours, "for services to paediatrics and to ethnic minority communities". In 2014 he was awarded the Freedom of the Borough of the Walsall in acknowledgement of halving the mortality of new-borns in Walsall, and for his work to improve paediatric services. In 2015 he received the Honorary Degree of Doctor of Science (D.Sc.) from the University of Wolverhampton. In 2017, the Royal College of Paediatrics and Child Health awarded him honorary fellowship.

Rotary International awarded him their Paul Harris Fellowship for his work helping to eradicate polio, and for setting up an orphanage for 200 children in Lalpur, India. He is a Fellow of the Royal College of Physicians (FRCP), and Member of the Royal Colleges of Surgeons of Great Britain and Ireland (MRCS) and has a silver-level National Award for Clinical Excellence.

Since 2014, he has served as a Deputy Lieutenant of the West Midlands county.

== Personal life ==
At Pinderfields he met Valerie, then a student nurse; the couple were married in 1975. Their daughter and son are both teachers.

His autobiography, 'Moments in Time: From Postman to Professor and Beyond', was published in 2017.

== Bibliography ==
- with Sheikh, Aziz (2001). Caring for Muslim Patients (2 ed.). ISBN 978-1857758122.
- with Sheikh, Aziz; Brown, Erica (2007). Palliative Care for South Asians: Muslims, Hindus, and Sikhs. ISBN 978-1856422772.
- Moments In Time: From Postman To Professor And Beyond. 2017. ISBN 978-1527216648.
