= ACCEA =

ACCEA may refer to:

- The Armenian Center for Contemporary Experimental Art
- The Advisory Committee on Clinical Excellence Awards in the UK
