= Eye of the Dolphin =

- Theatrical release poster
- Directed by: Michael D. Sellers
- Written by: Michael D. Sellers; Wendell Morris
- Produced by: Susan Johnson
- Starring: Carly Schroeder; Adrian Dunbar; George Harris; Katharine Ross; Christine Adams; Andrea Bowen
- Cinematography: Guy Livneh
- Music by: Alan Derian
- Production company: Quantum Entertainment
- Distributed by: Monterey Media
- Release date: August 21, 2007
- Running time: 103 minutes
- Country: United States
- Language: English

Eye of the Dolphin is a 2007 American drama film written by Wendell Morris & Michael Sellers. The film starred Carly Schroeder, Adrian Dunbar, George Harris, Katharine Ross and Christine Adams. Eye of the Dolphin was directed by Sellers.

A sequel entitled Beneath the Blue was released on October 24, 2010 starring Paul Wesley and Caitlin Wachs.

== Plot ==
A troubled fourteen-year-old girl named Alyssa (Carly Schroeder) has been living with her grandmother Lucy (Katharine Ross) since the death of her mother a year before. After being suspended from school for smoking, Alyssa is brought to the Bahamas to live with Hawk (Adrian Dunbar), the father she never knew she had. Alyssa's arrival on the island comes at a decisively inconvenient time for Hawk, a dolphin researcher, whose prickly personality puts him at odds with local politicians, who feel that the local economy needs good relations with tourists. It is a difficult relationship at first between Alyssa and her father, but Tamika (Christine Adams), Hawk's girlfriend, and Daniel (George Harris), Tamika's father, smooth the way. Alyssa soon adjusts to island life, and she discovers the gift that she shares with her father for communicating with dolphins, a skill which leads her into a powerful relationship with a wild dolphin which her father, for legitimate scientific reasons, cannot condone. But when the powers-that-be threaten to close down her father's research station, it is Alyssa and her wild friend who hold the key, and they have the power to bring all parties together.

== Cast ==
- Carly Schroeder as Alyssa
- Adrian Dunbar as Dr. James Hawk
- George Harris as Daniel
- Katharine Ross as Lucy
- Christine Adams as Tamika
- Jane Lynch as Glinton
- Andrea Bowen as Candace
- Kelly Vitz as Michelle

== Reception ==
=== Critical response ===
Eye of the Dolphin received generally negative reviews from critics. Review aggregator Rotten Tomatoes gives the film a rating of 29% based on 17 reviews, with an average rating of 4.6/10. Metacritic gives the season a score of 54 out of 100, based on 5 critics, indicating mixed reviews".

Film critic Joe Leyden of Variety wrote in his review: "There’s a pleasantly dreamy quality to much of Eye of the Dolphin, and that goes a long way toward enabling audiences to ignore the formulaic plot and enjoy the laid-back charms of this innocuous indie. Scenario about a troubled Los Angeles adolescent who gains a sense of purpose at her father’s Bahamian research center may have special resonance with tween and teen girls. But it could be difficult to hook that target demographic during the pic’s theatrical run, so Dolphin may not net a profit until it swims into ancillary tributaries."

== Production ==
The movie was filmed in the Bahamas in 2005, with key locations including Smith's Point and Port Lucaya on Grand Bahama Island. Filming took place at the Unexso dolphin facility in Port Lucaya and featured scenes like the fish bake and town hall events in Smith's Point.

=== Release ===
Eye of the Dolphin premiered at the ArcLight Hollywood on August 21, 2007. The film was released in more than 100 theatres, nationwide on August 24, 2007. Eye of the Dolphin was released on DVD on January 8, 2008, by Monterey media.

== Awards ==
- Winner of Best Drama in the International Family Film Festival
- Winner of Best Child Actor in the International Family Film Festival for Carly Schroeder

== Sequel ==
A sequel (also produced by Susan Johnson) titled Beneath the Blue was released straight to television in 2010. The film starred Paul Wesley, Caitlin Wachs and David Keith.

== Film Festival Showings ==
- Official Selection at the Tribeca Film Festival'
- Official Selection at the Delray Beach Film Festival
- Official Selection at the Kids First! Film Festival
- Official Selection at the Tiburon Film Festival
- Official Selection at the Austin Texas Film Festival
- Official Selection at the USA Family Film Festival
- Official Selection at the Worldfest Houston Film Festival
