= The Bar Code Tattoo =

2004 novel by Suzanne Weyn

- Author: Suzanne Weyn
- Language: English
- Genre: Science fiction, Dystopia
- Publisher: Scholastic
- Publication date: 1 September 2004
- Publication place: United States
- Pages: 256 pp
- ISBN: 978-0-439-39562-5
- OCLC: 56326076
- LC Class: PZ7.W539 Bar 2004
- Preceded by: none
- Followed by: The Bar Code Rebellion

The Bar Code Tattoo is a young adult science fiction novel written by American author Suzanne Weyn. It takes place in the not so distant future, and is about a girl, Kayla Reed, as 17 year old girl who can get a bar code tattoo as an ID, but suspects that there is something politically wrong with the tattoo.

In 2005, the American Library Association named it as a Quick Pick for Reluctant Young Adult Readers. The Nevada Library Association nominated the novel as a 2007 Best Young Adult Fiction. The Bar Code Tattoo was translated into German and in 2007 was nominated for the Jugendliteraturpreis given by the Federal Republic of Germany.

== Plot summary ==
In 2025, the Human Genome project has finally understood the entirety of the human genetic code - enough to have the code imprinted onto bar codes, along with other personal information regarding things such as bank accounts, social security numbers, and purchase records, allowing doctors to predict future diseases based on genetic history. Kayla Marie Reed is about to turn seventeen, the age when she can get her bar code tattoo (or "too" as often referred to in the book). Despite her friend's assurance, she is still somewhat indecisive about the idea of branding herself. This is furthered when her father commits suicide, triggering an expanding suspicion of the tattoos. After moving away with Kayla and gradually changing her behavior, Kayla's mother begins to go insane and loathe the tattoo. Immediately before her death in a kitchen fire, Kayla's mother reveals dire information to her daughter about unknown happenings at the crack attic and reveals other data stored in the tattoo including genetic information which will make it incredibly difficult to become insured by insurance companies and even hired if one has a bad genetic history. Kayla's mother believed that the "tattoo" was the reason her father died. After becoming wanted by the police for the possibility of murdering her mother, Kayla goes on the run and makes friends who are against the tattoo, including her former classmates that have joined together with Senator Young to form an organization known as "Project Decode" whose aim is to make the tattoo a personal option. Soon, it becomes illegal not to wear the "too" by the United States Government (whose President is also the CEO of the multinational corporation Global One, commonly called G1). After evading the 45 authorities for some time, Kayla finds that the police have taken in a girl who was previously a member of her resistance group and begins promoting the law and, along with a former member of resisters, becomes the spokesperson for Tattoo Gen.

== Reception ==
Teen Ink praised the book, calling it "instantly addicting". The School Library Journal overall panned the novel, writing that it "tries to cover too much territory and relies too heavily on coincidence and far-fetched plotting".

Natalie Hatch of the Children's Book and Media Review praised the "complex and well-thought-out" characters and wrote that the "struggles that teenage girls face with emotions, relationships, believing in others, wanting to fit in or conform, and even a difficult home life are tackled well." Hatch recommended the novel to "lovers of dystopian plots." Michael M. Jones of the SF, Fantasy & Horror's Monthly Trade Journal described it as a "chilling story spinning out of a logical progression" with a "fascinating" concept and "sound" reasoning. However, he also wrote that it "falls short is halfway through, with the introduction of psychic powers and a kind of forced evolution."
