= Distant Waves =

2009 novel by Suzanne Weyn

Distant Waves is an historical novel by Suzanne Weyn published in 2009. It uses the RMS Titanic as much of its setting, mixing fiction with real people who were alive during the Titanic era.

== Plot ==
A girl named Jane Taylor lives with her mother and four sisters (Mimi, Amelie, Emma, and Blythe). Her mother, Maude, is a medium. They live in America in the late 19th century. Jane's father has recently died from smallpox, and her mother is grieving.

One day, they go to a park to meditate, and Mimi and Jane go for a walk. Their mother decides to go to a little place named Spirit Vale. They take a train to New York City; there, the ground starts splitting apart and buildings shake. Nikola Tesla rescues them, and destroys a small device. He explains his device inadvertently caused the earthquake. Tesla believes that everything vibrates, at different frequencies, and thinks this can be used to travel in time and to different worlds. Tesla becomes Jane's role model, and she collects newspaper clippings about him over the years. Maude moves them to Spirit Vale, where they are going to stay at the inn. The inn is already full, but Maude "contacts" the deceased husband of the inn's owner, and she lets them stay.

When they stay in Spirit Vale Maude opens a business where she "contacts" the spirits and practices spiritualism. There she changes everyone's name to Oneida Taylor. Maude becomes well known and is the center and buzz of Spirit Vale. Everyone comes to see her and get readings and many other things. As the years pass many more things are added to her sign outside the home they share. They soon move out of the hotel and into their own house.

In 1911, Mimi and Jane run away to New York City, where Jane falls in love with Thad, Tesla's assistant. Mimi gets a job as a companion to a wealthy woman, Ninette, and she goes to travel with her to Europe. As Jane boards her train to return to Spirit Vale, Thad learns that Jane is only 16, 4 years younger than him. He doesn't write to Jane like he promised her. Jane gets very sad over Mimi's departure and Thad. Maude is devastated and blames Jane for running away with Mimi and her departure.

After Mimi has been gone for a while, she finally contacts her family while they are in London for a spiritual convention for mediums, psychics, etc. It is there that it is proven that the twins, Amelie and Emma, have their mother's gift of being able to speak to the dead after having Queen Victoria speak to Arthur Conan Doyle. Mimi reveals that she is going to be sailing on the Titanic, and Blythe wants to go with her. After much convincing, she is allowed to go. Mimi is in first class, and Blythe is in second class.

When W.T Stead predicts that the Titanic will sink and Mimi and Blythe are on it. Jane, Amelie, and Emma get on it to try to talk them into getting off of the boat when Jane bumps into Thad, who is on the ship with Tesla. He is overjoyed to see her, and he tells her he made a mistake in not being with her. Jane, Amelie, and Emma are convinced the ship won't sink, so they stay on. Mimi announces that she will be having her wedding to her mistress's butler on the Titanic.

Just before the wedding, Thad reveals to Jane that he loves her. She feels the same way, and Mimi is happy for her sister.

During the wedding, Tesla wants to show off his newest invention, which he intends to use to break ice; Jane recognizes it as the earthquake machine. Tesla's machine malfunctions, damaging the ship's runner, and the ship strikes an iceberg. They start telling people to get on lifeboats. They realize that Amelie is missing, so Mimi, Jane, Emma, and Thad go looking for her. Tesla tells Thad and Jane to follow him. He says he has an invention that could save everyone – a time machine. Mimi finds Jane in the bottom of the ship with Tesla and Thad. She tells her to get into the lifeboats, but she stays.

Tesla's machine partly works and Jane finds herself in the water. She sees a floating chair and she gets on it. She finds Amelie and Emma in the water. Tesla helps them up onto the overturned table he was on. Mrs. Brown's life boat spots them and they pulled Emma and Amelie on board. Emma dies of hypothermia. Amelie had two broken legs and frostbite on her toes. Nobody can find Mimi or Thad. Amelie goes to the hospital. She starts to talk, but says that Emma is talking. Jane recalls Emma saying "I won't leave", just before she dies.

Two years pass. Mimi and Thad, though no bodies were found, are believed to have drowned. Jane, now 19, gets a job as a reporter. She sees a picture on a newspaper of two people that survived the sinking of the Titanic. Jane thinks they look like Thad and Mimi. She begs her boss to let her do this story, and he lets her. She goes to them and finds that they are Mimi and Thad. When they were in the time machine, it didn't send them a few minutes into the future, it sent them a few years. Although to everyone else, Mimi and Thad had been gone years, to them it only seems like a few minutes. They all get on a train, and Jane reluctantly tells Mimi that her husband is dead. Jane, Thad, and Mimi ride back home together, where the book ends.

== Reception ==
Publishers Weekly wrote that the "interplay of science, spirituality, history and romance will satisfy." Kirkus Reviews wrote that the "well-researched story relies heavily on dialogue to impart rich historical detail, resulting in stiff, unnatural exchanges." Elizabeth Bush of The Bulletin of the Center for Children's Books wrote: "Titanic addicts may simply be happy to find a fresh title to add to the canon, but speculative-fiction fans are unlikely to wade through to the big finish, and historical-fiction enthusiasts will probably cry foul at the abrupt genre abandonment. Notes on historical figures are included."
