= Christine Adams (actress) =

British actress

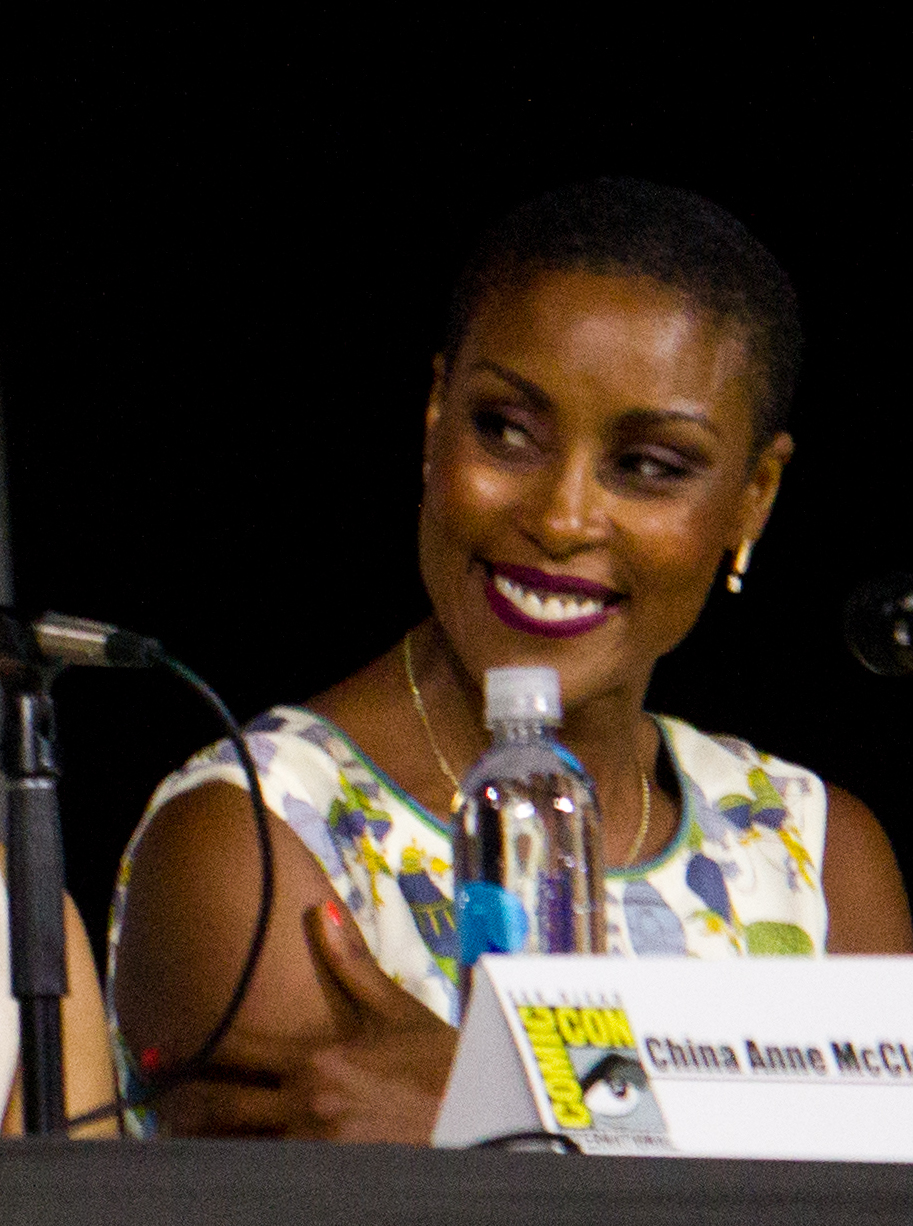
- Adams in 2017
- Born: 15 August 1974 (age 52); Brentwood, Essex, England
- Citizenship: United Kingdom; United States
- Education: Middlesex University
- Occupations: Actress; model
- Years active: 1998–present
- Children: 2

Christine Adams (born 15 August 1974) is a British actress. She is best known for playing Jessica in Batman Begins (2005), Lena Boudreaux in The Whole Truth (2010–2011), and as Lynn Pierce in Black Lightning (2018–2021).

== Early life ==
Adams was born in Brentwood, Essex and grew up in Northampton. She studied at Middlesex University.

== Career ==
Adams began her acting career starring in the mini-series NY-LON in 2004. She later guest-starred on many television series such as My Family, Doctor Who, Pushing Daisies, Heroes and Nip/Tuck and Real Husbands of Hollywood with Kevin Hart. Her film credits include Submerged, Batman Begins, Eye of the Dolphin, Green Flash, Beneath the Blue, and Tron: Legacy. Adams starred on the short-lived ABC series The Whole Truth as Lena Boudreaux in 2010, and FOX's Terra Nova as Mira, the leader of the "Sixers", a rebel group that arrived with the Sixth Pilgrimage but who soon broke away to oppose Terra Nova.

In 2012, Adams co-starred on the unsuccessful ABC drama pilot Americana as Anthony LaPaglia's wife Sierra, a bronze-skinned East African beauty and former supermodel. She later had a recurring role on Agents of S.H.I.E.L.D. as Agent Anne Weaver, and in 2016 starred in the short-lived AMC drama Feed the Beast opposite David Schwimmer.

In 2017, Adams was cast to be in The CW superhero television drama series Black Lightning created by Mara Brock Akil playing Lynn Pierce, Black Lightning's ex-wife.

== Personal life ==
As of 2012, Adams resided in Atlanta, Georgia with her husband and daughters. On 16 October 2019, she became a naturalized U.S. citizen.

== Filmography ==
=== Film ===
Year	Title	Role	Notes
1999	The World Is Not Enough	Girl in Casino	Uncredited
2001	Willows	Woman	Short film
2004	(Past Present Future) Imperfect	Chrissie	
2005	Submerged	Dr. Susan Chappell	Video
2005	Batman Begins	Jessica	
2006	Eye of the Dolphin	Tamika	
2008	Green Flash	Sophie	Video
2010	Beneath the Blue	Tamika	
2010	Tron: Legacy	Claire Atkinson	
2011	The Girl with the Dragon Tattoo	Barbados TV Reporter	
2015	Bad Blood	Tommy Bates	
2018	Profile	Vick	
2018	Spare Room	Doctor Eva Rae	
2021	The Unholy	Monica Slade	
2022	Moonshot	Jan	
2024	Miller's Girl	Joyce Manor	

=== Television ===
Year	Title	Role	Notes
1998	Noel's House Party		Episode: "7.15"
2000	Where There's Smoke	Sandra	TV film
2001	EastEnders	P.C.	1 episode
2002	In Deep	Michelle	Episodes: "Abuse of Trust: Parts 1 & 2"
2002	Doctors	Amanda Caiton	Episode: "Tick Tock"
2002	My Family	Alicia	Episode: "One Flew Out of the Cuckoo's Nest"
2002	Casualty	Melanie Phillips	Episode: "Only the Lonely"
2003	Murder in Mind	Chloe	Episode: "Contract"
2003	Fortysomething	30something	Episode: "1.1"
2003	Stargate SG-1	Mala	Episode: "Birthright"
2004	NY-LON	Katherine Williams Osgood	Series regular, 6 episodes
2005	Doctor Who	Cathica	Episode: "The Long Game"
2005	Love Soup	Vanessa	Episode: "Take Five"
2006	Casualty	Lou Clark	Episode: "Worlds Apart"
2006	Hustle	Nigella	Episode: "The Henderson Challenge"
2006	Home Again	Kym	Series regular, 6 episodes
2007	Studio 60 on the Sunset Strip	Stefanie	Episode: "The Disaster Show"
2007-2009	Pushing Daisies	Simone Hundin	Episodes: "Bitches", "Dim Sum Lose Some", and "Water & Power"
2007	Journeyman	Georgina Conrad	Episode: "The Hanged Man"
2008	To Love and Die	Eddie	TV pilot
2009	Lie to Me	Farida Mugisha	Episode: "Do No Harm"
2009	Heroes	Dr. Madeline Gibson	Episode: "Hysterical Blindness"
2010	CSI: Miami	Nancy Thurman	Episode: "Show Stopper"
2010	Nip/Tuck	Dr. Sarah Kwinda	Episode: "Sheila Carlton"
2010–11	The Whole Truth	Lena Boudreaux	Series regular, 10 episodes
2011	Terra Nova	Mira	Series regular, 13 episodes
2012	Americana	Sierra Delon-Soulter	TV pilot
2014–2015	Agents of S.H.I.E.L.D.	Agent Anne Weaver	Recurring role
2014	Legends	Hani Jibril	2 episodes
2014–15	The Mentalist	Lena Abbott	3 episodes
2015	Castle	Dr. Barbara Lillstrom	Episode: 'PhDead'
2016	Pure Genius	Giselle Overman	Episode: 'A Bunker Hill Christmas'
2016	Feed the Beast	Rie Moran	Series regular, 10 episodes
2018–2021	Black Lightning	Dr. Lynn Stewart/Lynn Pierce	Series regular
2018	Counterpart	Cara	3 Episodes
2019	Love, Death & Robots	Ivrina (voice)	Episode: "Sonnie's Edge"
2021	Castlevania	The Alchemist (voice)	2 episodes
2021–2022	Ordinary Joe	Regina Diaz	6 episodes
2023	Hijack	Marsha Smith-Nelson	5 episodes
2023	The Mandalorian	Quarren Captain	Episode: "Chapter 22: Guns for Hire"
2023	Judgement	Monica Moore	Episode: "Laws of Attraction"
2024	Dinner with the Parents	Susan Spiegel	2 episodes
