= Link (film) =

1986 film by Richard Franklin

- Theatrical release poster
- Directed by: Richard Franklin
- Screenplay by: Everett De Roche
- Story by: Lee David Zlotoff and Tom Ackermann
- Produced by: Richard Franklin
- Starring: Elisabeth Shue; Terence Stamp
- Cinematography: Mike Molloy
- Edited by: Andrew London; Derek Trigg
- Music by: Jerry Goldsmith
- Production company: Thorn EMI Screen Entertainment
- Distributed by: The Cannon Group
- Release dates: January 1986 (Avoriaz Fantasy Film Festival); 31 October 1986 (U.S.)
- Running time: 103 minutes
- Country: United Kingdom
- Language: English
- Budget: $6 million
- Box office: $1,720,450 (USA)

Link is a 1986 British horror film starring Elisabeth Shue and Terence Stamp along with a trio of simian stars which consist of Locke as Link, Jed as Imp, and Carrie as Voodoo. The title character, "Link", is a super-intelligent yet malicious chimpanzee (played by an orangutan) who lashes out against his masters when they try to have him euthanized.

It was directed by Richard Franklin and written by Everett De Roche from a story by Lee David Zlotoff and Tom Ackermann. The score was provided by Jerry Goldsmith. It was filmed in St. Abbs, Scotland. Shue and Goldsmith received Saturn Award nominations for their contributions.

Franklin was a devotee of Alfred Hitchcock - he had recently directed Psycho II - and said after filming “I hesitate to liken it to The Birds because everyone will say ‘Oh shit, he's doing Hitchcock again.' Unlike The Birds, which is kind of a fantasy, Link is based on anthropological realities. I'm calling it an anthropological thriller as opposed to a psychological thriller.”

== Plot ==
One night a young girl, Becky, screams in bed, claiming she saw something at the window. Elsewhere in the house, someone has killed some animals.

Dr. Steven Phillip lives in a Victorian mansion by the English Coast with three apes (Two chimpanzees and an orangutan) which he has been doing research on to investigate the “link” between man and ape. Jane Chase is invited to his house during summer vacation as an assistant, and upon arriving, she gets greeted at the door by an orangutan named Link, dressed in a butler's uniform.

Phillip disappears, but Jane thinks he left for London. She decides to stay with the chimpanzees. Over time, the apes become more violent. They begin to take over the house and to get involved in inter-tribal squabbles, leading to a confrontation with Jane.

== Cast ==
=== Human actors ===
- Elisabeth Shue as Jane Chase, an American zoology student studying in England who takes the opportunity to assist Dr. Phillip with his studies.
- Terence Stamp as Dr. Steven Phillip, an anthropologist studying the mental capabilities of chimpanzees in his isolated estate in the English countryside. The role was devised for Richard Burton and offered to Albert Finney, Anthony Perkins, Christopher Plummer and Anthony Hopkins, and they turned it down.
- Steven Pinner as David, Jane's boyfriend who investigates Phillip's estate after Jane's call gets abruptly cut off.
- Kevin Lloyd as Bailey, Phillip's friend who is called to put Link down.
- David O'Hara as Tom, David's friend who goes with him on his search for Jane.
- Richard Garnett as Dennis, David's friend who goes with him on his search for Jane.
- Linus Roache (uncredited)

=== Ape actors ===
- Locke as Link, a 45 year old circus chimpanzee who now serves as Phillip's butler and lashes out against his human masters. Despite being written to be a chimpanzee and having a poster of his old circus days as a chimpanzee, the role was given to Locke who is an orangutan. His fur was dyed darker and he wore prosthetic ears to make him resemble a chimpanzee. He was owned and trained by legendary animal trainer Ray Berwick.
- Carrie as Voodoo, a female chimpanzee who is often caged for her aggressive nature, but is occasionally let loose. This is one of the few times a full grown chimpanzee is used in a film.
- Jed as Imp, Voodoo's son and Phillip's prized student in his studies. He has a tendency to escape and kill other animals (birds, cats, sheep).

== Production ==
In 1979 Richard Franklin optioned a short outline which he described as "a sort of Jaws with chimps." He did not do anything with it until the writer Everett de Roche showed him a National Geographic article by Jane Goodall about violence among chimpanzees.

Franklin later said what sparked the idea of the film was Goodall observing "the cannibalizing of young chimpanzees by one particular mad female chimp. She observed actual inter-tribal warfare, not unlike the opening of 2001, between two groups of chimps. The whole ’60s idea of man being the only animal to make war against its own kind was suddenly thrown out the window. Since then, they've discovered that lions and other animals do it as well, but that, to me, was a really interesting idea for a good thriller.”

Everett De Roche wrote the script. Franklin tried to get finance for the film in Australia in 1981 but was then offered Psycho II which led to Cloak and Dagger. After those films he decided to reactivate Link.

"Link is much more mysterious than it is horrifying," said Franklin. "For a long time, the girl doesn't know, nor does the audience, exactly what happened to the doctor. It owes a bit to Psycho, actually, because you'll notice that in mood, tone and look, it resembles Psycho II, crossed with the English setting of Jane Eyre.”

"It's very suspenseful and moderately violent, although chimps indulge in bloodless violence," said Franklin. "They don't use weapons, they just pull your arms off.”

=== Shooting ===
The film was made in the UK for EMI Films. "The English setting to me was essential," said Franklin. "I wanted to contrast the primitivism of jungle animals with Old World values, high culture, and "civilisation" - which is one of the subjects of the picture."

Franklin was asked to use make up for the apes but he elected to use real apes, and editing techniques to make it seem how they were reacting.

"From a technical viewpoint, it was really not as hard to do as I had anticipated," said Franklin. "But there was a lot of pressure on me, even at the last minute, to use men in suits, which I thought would be dishonest. We weren't making a fantasy, and we weren't making Greystoke with its fable-like qualities. We were doing something which was supposed to be based on what chimps can really do. "

Filming finished in July 1985. It was one of the last films made under the regime of Verity Lambert at EMI.

"The killings are strange with one chimp actually pulling somebody through a mail slot, which is kind of different,” said Franklin. “It breaks new ground, and cinematically, it has never been done."

== Release ==
The film had its world premiere at the Avoriaz Fantasy Film Festival in January 1986. It received a special jury prize at the festival. Prior to the film's release Franklin said "Universal's instinct will probably be to release it this summer, which I really hope they don't do. It's not a Spielberg movie. It's quite different and, in a way, I wish Psycho II had been given the chance to make more money by playing fewer theatres for a longer period of time. Link is a very special thriller and should be treated accordingly.”

When the film was released in the US by the Cannon Group, eight minutes were cut, despite Franklin's objections. When EMI was taken over by the Cannon Group, five more minutes were cut out. Franklin later described this process as "each new one chipping a little more away until my wife was moved to liken the plight of my monkey movie to that of the horse in Black Beauty."

== Reception ==
The film received generally mixed reviews. Rotten Tomatoes gave the film 44% positive reviews based on 18 reviews. Franklin later called the movie "on almost every level... an unsatisfying experience."

== Alternate versions ==
The French cut is 3 minutes shorter (the opening sequence is missing), but features scenes that were cut from the international version. In 2021, a composite 125 minutes extended cut was released in France; this cut was created based on various sources and features all scenes from both versions.

== Cancelled sequel ==
Prior to the film's release Franklin said he had an idea for a follow-up movie, about an anthropologist in Africa who becomes involved in a chimpanzee war. "It would be another picture entirely, ” said Franklin. "Steven Spielberg said he would direct Jaws 2 if he could do the story of the Indianapolis, which is the story that's told in Jaws by Robert Shaw. With Link, we got an entirely different story, which takes chimps as far from the jungles of Africa as possible.” However the commercial failure of Link meant the film was never made.

== Notes ==
- Gross, Edward (1986). "Going Ape with Link". Fangoria. No. 52. p. 38-65.
