= George Harris (actor) =

Retired actor

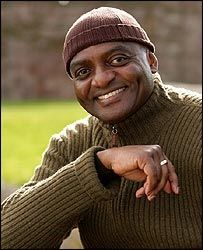
- Born: George William Harris; 20 October 1949 (age 76); Grenada, British Windward Islands
- Occupation: Actor
- Years active: 1969–2013

George William Harris (born 20 October 1949) is a retired Grenadian actor. His notable roles include Kingsley Shacklebolt in the Harry Potter film series, Captain Simon Katanga in Raiders of the Lost Ark, and Clive King in the BBC medical drama Casualty. He retired from acting in 2013.

== Life and career ==
In 1972, he played the role of Caiaphas in the West End musical Jesus Christ Superstar.

In 1981, he played Captain Simon Katanga in Raiders of the Lost Ark. He was one of the original cast members of Casualty, in which he played Clive King from 1986. He also played real-life Somali arms dealer Osman Ali Atto in the 2001 film Black Hawk Down.

Between 2007 and 2011, he played Kingsley Shacklebolt in three films of the Harry Potter series: Order of the Phoenix and both parts of Deathly Hallows. His last new television roles were in 2012, including a supporting role in the Sky1 series Sinbad.

In 2013, he played the Abbot in BBC Radio 4's adaptation of Neil Gaiman's Neverwhere. Harris retired from acting in 2013 and has not made any new appearances in film or television since.

== Filmography ==
Film
Year	Title	Role	Notes
1969	The Gladiators	Nigerian Officer	
1972	The Broad Coalition		
1979	Yanks	Black driver	
1980	Flash Gordon	Prince Thun of Ardentia	
1980	The Dogs of War	Colonel Bobi	
1981	Raiders of the Lost Ark	Captain Simon Katanga	
1981	Ragtime	Clef Club Bandleader	
1986	The American Way	Vet Cameraman #1	
1989	Slaves of New York	Super	
1989	See No Evil, Hear No Evil	Bartender	
1994	The Browning Version	Adakendi Senior	
1994	Camilla	Jerry	
1995	Soul Survivor	Winston Price	
1998	Madeline	Liberian Ambassador	
1998	Appetite	Arthur	
2001	The Emperor's New Clothes	Papa Nicholas	
2001	Black Hawk Down	Osman Ali Atto	
2004	Layer Cake	Morty	
2005	The Interpreter	Kuman-Kuman	
2006	Eye of the Dolphin	Daniel	
2007	Harry Potter and the Order of the Phoenix	Kingsley Shacklebolt	
2009	Agora	Heladius Dignitary	
2009	The Heavy	Doctor	
2010	Beneath the Blue	Daniel	
2010	Harry Potter and the Deathly Hallows – Part 1	Kingsley Shacklebolt	
2011	National Theatre Live: Frankenstein	M. Frankenstein	Filmed stage production
2011	Harry Potter and the Deathly Hallows – Part 2	Kingsley Shacklebolt	

Television
Year	Title	Role	Notes
1976	The Sweeney	Zak Franklyn	1 episode
1981	Wolcott	Winston Churchill Wolcott	4 episodes
1981	Prisoners of Conscience	Nelson Mandela	1 episode
1986–2004	Casualty	Clive King / Neville Newton	16 episodes
1992	Prime Suspect	Vernon Allen	2 episodes
1992	Downtown Lagos	Biliaminu Uthmani	3 episodes
1996	Gulliver's Travels	Brobdingnag Scientist	1 episode
1999	The Bill	Mr Price	1 episode
2000–2001	Starhunter	Darius Scott	5 episodes
2004–2005	55 Degrees North	Errol Hill	14 episodes
2005	Judge John Deed	Judge Ben Wharton	1 episode
2007	Trailblazers	Himself	1 episode
2012	Sinbad	Zalelew	2 episodes
