= Gracie (film) =

2007 film by Davis Guggenheim

- Theatrical release poster
- Directed by: Davis Guggenheim
- Screenplay by: Lisa Marie Petersen; Karen Janszen
- Story by: Andrew Shue; Davis Guggenheim; Ken Himmelman
- Produced by: Davis Guggenheim; Andrew Shue; Elisabeth Shue; John Shue
- Starring: Dermot Mulroney; Elisabeth Shue; Carly Schroeder; John Doman; Andrew Shue
- Cinematography: Chris Manley
- Edited by: Elizabeth Kling
- Music by: Mark Isham
- Distributed by: Picturehouse Entertainment
- Release date: June 1, 2007
- Running time: 95 minutes
- Country: United States
- Language: English
- Budget: $9 million
- Box office: $3.8 million

Gracie is a 2007 American sports drama film directed by Davis Guggenheim. It stars Carly Schroeder as Gracie Bowen, Dermot Mulroney as Bryan Bowen, Elisabeth Shue as Lindsay Bowen, Jesse Lee Soffer as Johnny Bowen, and Andrew Shue as Coach Owen Clark.

Gracie takes place in New Jersey in 1978, before 1972's Title IX had taken much effect in women's college sports and when organized women's soccer was still very rare in the United States. Gracie, the film's central protagonist, overcomes the loss of her brother by convincing her family and school to allow her to play varsity soccer on an all-boys team. The story is partially based on the childhood experiences of Elisabeth Shue, who was one of the producers in addition to being the wife of Davis Guggenheim, the director, as well as a cast member.

The novelization of Gracie, written by Suzanne Weyn, was released in June 2007.

== Plot ==
In the year 1978, Gracie Bowen, a 15-year-old tomboy who lives in South Orange, New Jersey, is crazy about soccer, as are her three brothers and their former soccer star father. Although Gracie wants to join her brothers and neighbor Kyle in the nightly practices her father runs, she is discouraged by everyone except her older brother, Johnny.

Johnny, Gracie and Kyle attend Columbia High School, where Johnny is the captain and star player for the varsity soccer team. After missing a shot at the end of a game, the despondent Johnny drives off with a friend's car and dies in a traffic accident.

Struggling with grief, Gracie decides that she wants to replace her brother on the team. Her father does not believe that girls should play soccer, telling her she is neither tough nor talented enough. Her mother is a nurse who lacks the competitive drive of the rest of her family and fears for Gracie's safety. Her mother later tells Gracie that she would have liked to become a surgeon, but that option had not been available to her as a woman.

Rejected and depressed, Gracie begins to rebel; she stops doing her schoolwork, is caught cheating on an exam, and experiments with wild and self-destructive behavior. She is finally caught by her father almost having sex with a guy she met near the docks after telling her friend, "I want to do something that I've never done before." This serves as a wake-up call for her parents, particularly her father. He quits his job to work with her on her soccer training.

When the school board rejects her request to play boys' soccer, Gracie files an appeal. Citing the newly passed Title IX, Gracie argues that since a girls' soccer team does not exist, she should be allowed to play on the boys' varsity soccer team. The school board allows her to try out for the team. After a very rough tryout, she makes the junior varsity team and has to decide if she is willing to settle for playing at that level. She decides to make the most of playing on junior varsity.

One of the coaches asks her to come up to the main team for their championship game. After saying no at first she finally goes. Gracie watches from the bench as the game goes to sudden death overtime. New captain Kyle gets hurt and Gracie goes in for him, scoring the winning goal with a move that her dad taught her.

== Cast ==
- Carly Schroeder as Grace Bowen
- Dermot Mulroney as father Bryan Bowen
- Elisabeth Shue as mother Lindsay Bowen
- Jesse Lee Soffer as Johnny Bowen
- Christopher Shand as Kyle Rhodes
- Emma Bell as Kate Dorset
- Hunter Schroeder as Mike Bowen
- Trevor Heins as Daniel Bowen
- Joshua Caras as Peter Wicker
- Madison Arnold as Granddad
- John Doman as Coach Colasanti
- Andrew Shue as Coach Owen Clark

== Historical background ==
The premise of the film rests upon the conflicting expectations of two different American generations. As Gracie's parents were most likely both products of what is now referred to as the "Silent Generation" of children born during the Great Depression and World War II, they would have been raised to adhere to traditional gender roles. This would have included discouraging a girl from participating in "boys' sports" such as soccer, as opposed to "girls' sports" such as cheerleading or gymnastics. Gracie, on the other hand, came of age during the 1970s, when new and controversial ideas about gender were being introduced.

Eleanor Ringel Gillespie, critic for the Atlanta Journal-Constitution, noted an additional generation gap between those in the film and those in the audience, many of whom grew up with the United States women's national soccer team (which played its first game in 1985) as a reality:

Not so long ago – 1978, actually – girls were not treated equally with boys when it came to school sports ... what happens in Gracie must seem like a tale from the Dark Ages to today's young athletes, something akin to slaying a dragon or housekeeping for seven dwarfs. But think of it this way: In 1978, future gold medalist and World Cup star Mia Hamm was only 6 years old.

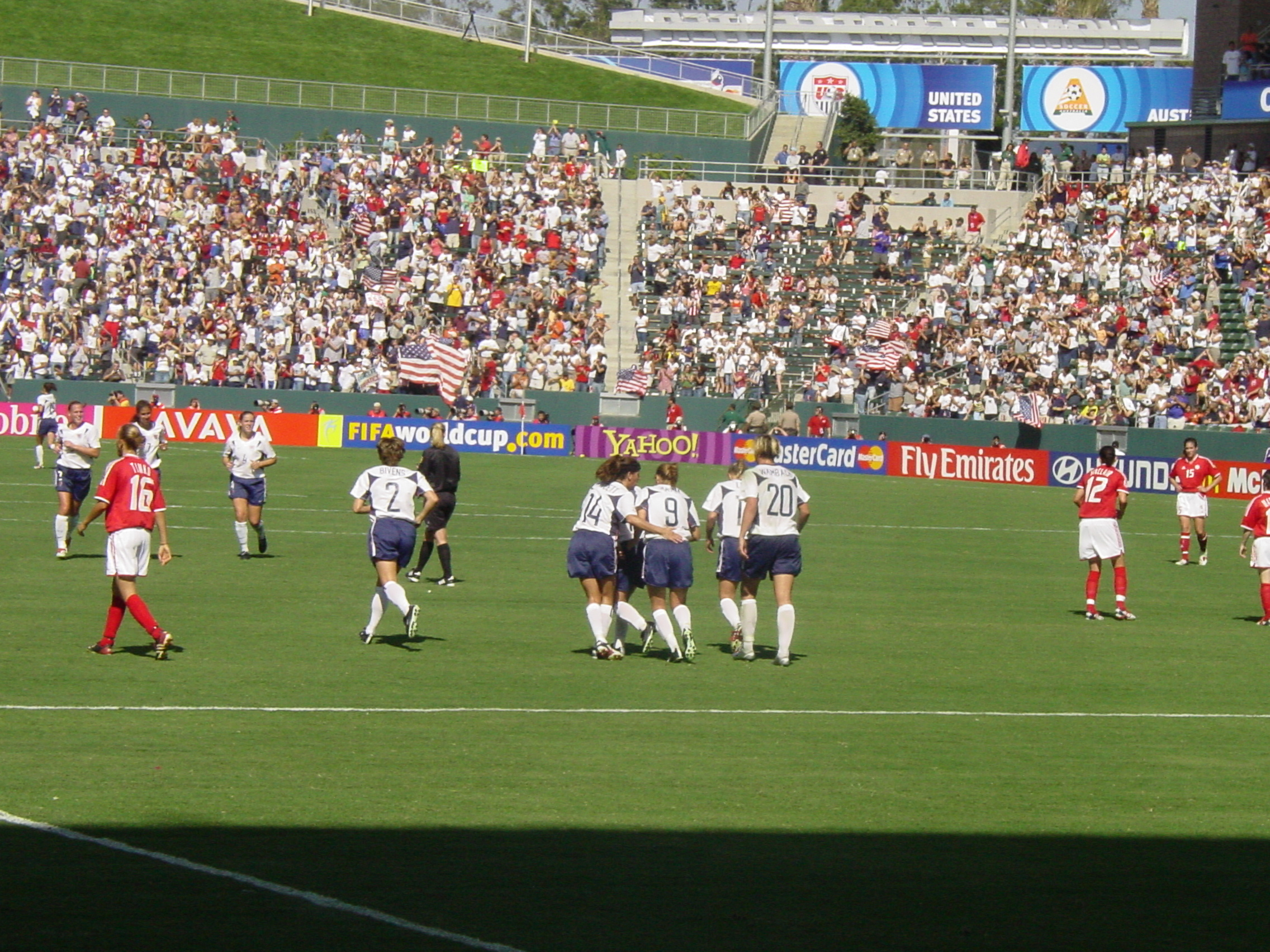
2003 FIFA Women's World Cup

Other critics have also noted the multiple generation gaps. Kevin Cahillane observes in the New York Times that, "this being 1978 (before Title IX turned a generation of girls from onlookers into athletes), her desire goes against the wishes of the coach, the principal, the other players and her heartbroken parents." In another article for the New York Times, Jeannette Catsoulis further argues that, "[Gracie] is accustomed to having her abilities overlooked ... When tragedy strikes, and Grace channels her grief into a resolution to play on the all-male varsity team, even her best friend is horrified. As everyone knows, only lesbians play soccer."

The film closes with the following remarks: "Thanks to Title IX and brave girls like Gracie, there are over 5 million girls who play soccer in America. Since 1991 the U.S. Women's National team has won Soccer's World Championships four times." (FIFA Women's World Cup Champions 1991, 1999, 2015, and 2019)

== Production ==
=== Development and casting ===
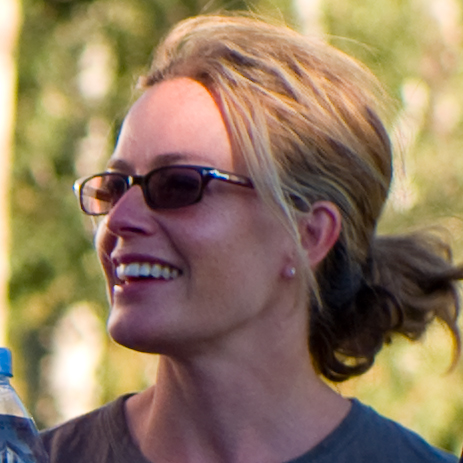
Elisabeth Shue in August 2007.

The film is loosely based on life events concerning the Shue family. Former Melrose Place star Andrew Shue, who developed the film, was one of its producers, and acted a supporting role in the film, initially conceived of it as a story about his late brother William, the oldest Shue sibling, who was the captain of the Columbia High School soccer team that won the New Jersey state championship in 1978; he had died in an accident in 1988. As Andrew developed the idea with his brother-in-law Davis Guggenheim, the director of An Inconvenient Truth, the storyline began to shift towards Guggenheim's wife, Elisabeth Shue, Andrew's older sister. She became the model for Gracie, and William became the model for Johnny. As Andrew Shue noted in an interview:

... It was going to be about my older brother, originally. It was really Davis, my sister's husband, who pointed out to me that my sister was the real underdog in our family. I didn't know the emotional turmoil of a girl in an all-boys family trying to get some credit for the fact that she had this courage to play with boys. She has gone from being a girl who was scared, to being this brave girl who could stand up and play with boys, and [went] into acting before any of us and inspired all of us in many ways. So I wanted to celebrate her and her journey.

This refers to Elisabeth Shue's own decision in 1972, at the age of nine, to play soccer on an all-boys team, making her the first girl in the South Orange and Maplewood areas of New Jersey to do so. Shue explained her reason for doing so in a 2007 interview. "There was no other choice back then," she pointed out to the interviewer. "There was no girls team to play on." Shue continued to play on the team until 1976, when she turned 13. Of her decision to leave the team, Shue stated, "the movie is really what would have happened if I hadn't quit [playing soccer]. I quit because of what people would think of me. The pressure from the boys. The awkward development of my body. I really, really regret it. I wish I'd been brave enough."

Andrew, Elizabeth, their brother John (who was also a producer on the film), and Guggenheim then engaged in an extensive search to find the right actress for the role of fifteen-year-old Gracie; they promoted the search on the website findinggracie.com. The role eventually went to athlete-actress Carly Schroeder. Frederic and Mary Ann Brussat argue that Schroeder "puts in a stellar performance as the teenager who becomes a warrior when most of her peers are cheering from the sidelines."

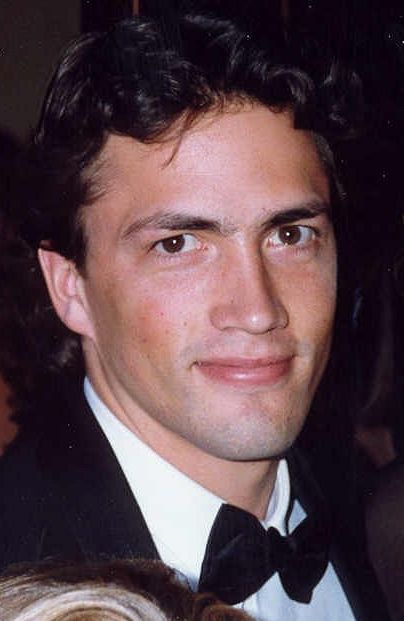
Andrew Shue in February 2006

Filming took partial place at Columbia High School, both the setting of the events of the film and the actual high school the Shue family members had attended. Filming also took place in various locations in South Plainfield, New Jersey.

Andrew Shue chose to honor his former Dartmouth and Columbia High School teammate Chris Colasanti by naming the story's coach after him. Colasanti, who had been the captain of Columbia's 1985 state championship team, was killed in the September 11, 2001 attack on the World Trade Center.

== Reception ==
=== Reviews ===
At the Movies with Ebert & Roeper gave Gracie "Two Thumbs up", stating, "You've seen it before, but you'll rarely see it better." Gracie is a New York Times Critics' Pick. Times critic Jeannette Catsoulis described Gracie as "a familiar underdog story told with unusual sensitivity ... Gracie connects the adversity-drama dots – the beat-down, the bounce-back, the last-minute support from an unexpected quarter – with a subtle awareness of the shock waves of bereavement. Balancing the emotional complexity is Chris Manley's refreshingly unaffected cinematography; the drama of a free kick, like that of a good movie, is best viewed through a steady lens." Bill Zwecker, of the Chicago Sun-Times, stated, "It's a sweet and uplifting film, and though quite predictable, gives us a family drama that showcases simple truths about overcoming seemingly impossible odds and leaves you with a warm and very satisfying feeling deep down. It's a solid, hopeful and inspiring story that reminds us of what we might call 'old-fashioned' values about perseverance and making your dreams come true. Old-fashioned? Not at all."

Owen Gleiberman of Entertainment Weekly argued that "in 1978, a high school girl playing competitive soccer wasn't just novel – it was barely heard of. This amiable rouser, based on the experiences of Elisabeth Shue and her family, tries to convey how gutsy and role-smashing it is for ... Gracie to cleat her way onto an all-boys soccer team. So why is Gracie as processed as an after-school special? You miss the knockabout edge of Bend It Like Beckham – though the ending, in its Pavlovian sports-flick way, pumps you up." Scott Tobias of The A.V. Club suggested that "though Gracie fashions Shue's story into ready-made inspirational formula, it's nonetheless vivid in its particulars, from the looks and sounds of late-'70s New Jersey to the portrait of a soccer-driven family reformed by loss." Lael Loewenstein of the Los Angeles Times stated that Gracie is "an earnest, well-acted, poignant drama that nevertheless runs afoul of sports movie clichés."

The film received a 62% rating from Rotten Tomatoes based on 91 reviews, with an average rating of 5.90/10. The consensus reads, "Gracie can be rousing and touching in spots, but is ultimately undone by its predictable story arc and a lack of nuance." Metacritic, which uses a weighted average, assigned the film a score of 52 out of 100, based on 25 critics, indicating "mixed or average" reviews.

=== Box office ===
On a budget of $9 million, the limited release film made about $4 million at the box office and over $3 million in rentals.

=== Awards ===
- Heartland Film Festival, Truly Moving Sound Award

== Soundtrack ==
The soundtrack contains a number of popular classic rock songs, many of which are from the year 1978.

=== Songs included in the CD ===
The CD was released in 2007 by Lakeshore Records.

- "Don't Look Back" – Boston
- "Fox on the Run" – Sweet
- "Rock Steady" – Aretha Franklin
- "Funk #49" – The James Gang
- "Hanging on the Telephone" – Blondie
- "Jailbreak" – Thin Lizzy
- "Free Ride" – Edgar Winter Group
- "Born Under the Wrong Sign" – Nazareth
- "Jackie Blue" – Ozark Mountain Daredevils
- "You Are the Woman" – Firefall
- "The Tonight Show" – Doc Severinsen & The Tonight Show Band
- "Heart of Glass" – Blondie
- "Bad Intentions" – Dweezil Zappa

=== Songs not included in the CD ===
- "Growin' Up" – Bruce Springsteen

== Soundtrack ==
Lakeshore Records also released a CD of the film's score, composed by Mark Isham.

- Free Kick (3:03)
- Johnny (3:22)
- Gracie's Revelation (2:22)
- Shit Sandwich (1:56)
- I Am Tough Enough (1:04)
- Granddad (1:21)
- Let Me Help You (1:13)
- Asphalt Soccer (1:42)
- You Were Like A Star (1:32)
- Appealing The Board (1:45)
- Lindsay's Speech (1:06)
- I Coach YOU Now (:56)
- First Two Cuts (2:48)
- Third Cut (2:18)
- JV Practice (2:27)
- Letting Go (1:14)
- Gracie's Free Kick/Beating Kingston (8:57)

== See also ==
- Title IX
- Bend It Like Beckham
- List of association football films
