= Submerged (2005 film) =

- DVD cover
- Directed by: Anthony Hickox
- Written by: Anthony Hickox; Paul de Souza
- Produced by: Paul de Souza; Michael P. Flannigan; Daphne Lerner; David Varod; Randall Emmett
- Starring: Steven Seagal; William Hope; Vinnie Jones; Christine Adams
- Cinematography: David Bridges
- Edited by: Michael John Bateman; Alain Jakubowicz
- Music by: Guy Farley
- Production companies: Millennium Films; Nu Image; Emmett/Furla Films
- Distributed by: Sony Pictures Home Entertainment
- Release date: May 31, 2005
- Running time: 95 minutes
- Country: United States
- Language: English
- Budget: $10–15 million

Submerged is a 2005 American action film directed by Anthony Hickox, who also wrote it with Paul de Souza and produced with Michael P. Flannigan, Daphne Lerner and David Varod. The film stars Steven Seagal, William Hope, Vinnie Jones and Christine Adams. The film was released on direct-to-DVD in the United States on May 31, 2005.

== Plot ==
Chris Cody (Steven Seagal) is a top-ranked mercenary who took part in an undercover operation to stop a major terrorist strike on U.S. soil; a strike that the UN refused to believe was about to happen. Cody had to break a number of laws in order to do the job, and he is in a military prison.

At the U.S. Embassy in Montevideo, Uruguay, Secret Service agents are briefing the ambassador on a terrorist base when they suddenly go haywire and kill her and then themselves. Later, in Washington DC, intelligence analyst Dr. Chappell (Christine Adams) concludes that some sort of mind control device must have been used. A Delta Force commando team is sent to Uruguay to investigate, but they are quickly ambushed and captured. Taken to the terrorist base, they are brainwashed by Dr. Adrian Lehder (Nick Brimble), a scientist who heads a secret CIA experiment in mind control, programming soldiers to become virtually unstoppable killing machines when they are given the right commands.

The Navy recruits Cody and his talented crew to take Chappell and special agent Fletcher (William Hope) with them in an effort to destroy the facility and take down Lehder. Cody is promised that in exchange, he and his crew will be freed and cleared of the alleged misconduct that they were accused of and receive $100,000 each. Suspicious, Cody quickly jettisons Fletcher, who turns out to be in league with Lehder. Fletcher tips off Lehder, and they quickly abandon Lehder's facility, leaving behind a few American prisoners as Trojan horses.

One team of Cody's men commandeers a submarine, while the others secure the base and rescue the prisoners. The team fights its way past a tank, destroys the base, and escapes on the sub. But they end up stuck on the sub with some of the mind-controlled soldiers. After fighting off the soldiers and escaping from the sub, Cody and his crew realize that they must race to bring down Lehder before the rest of his soldiers claim them all.

== Cast ==
- Steven Seagal as Chris Cody
- Christine Adams as Dr. Susan Chappell
- William Hope as Agent Fletcher
- Vinnie Jones as Henry
- Nick Brimble as Dr. Adrian Lehder
- Alison King as Damita
- P. H. Moriarty as Chief
- Gary Daniels as Col. John Sharpe
- Ross McCall as Captain Plowden
- Stephen Taylor as Luis
- Peter Youngblood Hills as "Doc" Shock
- Adam Fogerty as O'Hearn
- Chris Hazlewood as Captain Harding
- Nikolai Sotirov as Col. Jorge Hilan
- William Tapley as Ambassador Ron Higgins
- Martin McDougall as Assistant
- Sam Douglas as Admiral Burgess
- Leigh Zimmerman as US Ambassador
- John Kaleckas as Hammond
- Vlado Nikolov as Ruggero
- Raicho Vasilev as Ender
- Yulian Vergov as Rollins
- Nikola Dodov as President Valard
- Luis Soto as Alberto Sandrow

== Production ==
Director Anthony Hickox later said the script was "brilliant... It started life as a full on horror and sci-fi. I just thought wouldn’t it be great if you were stuck at the bottom of the ocean with fucking aliens on your submarine! So that was the original idea, and we story boarded it and we designed the creatures; like these little, mini kind of crab insects that could go down the drains of the submarine so you’d never know when they were coming".

The lead character was supposed to be a bitter old drunken captain. Hickox described his project as "The Thing in a submarine" or "The Thing meets Das Boot".

"It was really interesting", said Hickox. "And then Seagal came on board".

According to Hickox, Seagal said that he liked the script; but, three weeks before shooting was to start, Seagal called him and said: "I don't think this movie should be on a submarine". He also wanted an opera scene and said that "I've decided I don't like aliens and I don't like monsters. I don't want to be in a monster movie".

The director said "that's why it ended up like it did. We had no clue what we were doing: no script, and the whole mind control thing in the final film was made up the last week before shooting! It was really insane. At that point, again, I should have quit, but I needed the cash".

It was made by Emmett/Furla Films, a wholly owned subsidiary of Family Room Entertainment Corporation.

It is set and filmed in Sofia, Bulgaria in 31 days from August 16 to September 16, 2004.

Alison King said of working on the film: "It was filmed in Bulgaria. He’s a member of the American military and I’m Dimita – the best field op in the business. I’m an action girl with a high pony-tail doing lots of stunts. The stunt guy had worked with Angelina Jolie on Tomb Raider and he showed me how to hang upside down from things, how to jump down into dams and how to strangle people with my knees. It was great fun".

== Reception ==
Vern, reviewing the film for Ain't It Cool News, called it "one of the worst and least entertaining" of Seagal's films.

== Controversy ==
In Uruguay, the film became controversial for its misleading and inaccurate image of the country. It depicts Mayan ruins in a territory that was never inhabited by the Maya, features signs in French and Italian despite the country being Spanish-speaking, and the characters speak with a Mexican accent, further detaching the film from the local cultural context. Additionally, the film shows lush jungle landscapes that do not exist in the region, portrays issues of gang violence, terrorism and drug trafficking, which are not representative of the nation’s reality, and presents a harsh military dictatorship in a country widely recognized as one of the most stable democracies in the Americas and the world.

The Uruguayan government condemned the film for the "use of our country’s name, as well as the national flag, associating them with terrorist actions", and stated that it was considering legal actions in response.

== Home media ==
DVD was released in Region 1 in the United States on May 31, 2005, and also Region 2 in the United Kingdom on 5 September 2005, it was distributed by Sony Pictures Home Entertainment.
