= Founders High School =

Public, government boarding/day school in Bulawayo, Zimbabwe

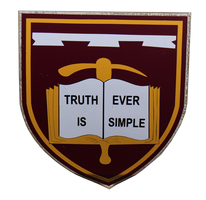
- Founders High School Crest

Location
- Dundee Drive; Bulawayo; Zimbabwe

Information
- School type: Public boarding/day
- Motto: Truth is ever simple
- Opened: January 1952; 74 years ago
- Headmistress: Mrs D.Moyo
- Language: English and Ndebele
- Colours: White, Yellow, Maroon

Founders High School is a public high school in Bulawayo, Zimbabwe. It includes both day and boarding students.

== History ==
Founders High School was founded in January 1952 as Southern Rhodesia's first secondary school for Coloured and Asian students. It was established at the Herbert Stanley Hostel on Dundee Drive in the Barham Green area of Bulawayo. Today, most of its students are black Africans from suburbs including Emganwini, Nketa, Tshabalala, Southwold, Bellevue and Nkulumane.

In 2016, the school received an award called the Secretary's Bell.

== Notable people ==
=== Alumni ===
- Fay Chung, educator and politician, cabinet minister
- Rashid Gatrad, consultant paediatrician and deputy lieutenant of the West Midlands
- Noel Kaseke, footballer
- Edwin Muguti, surgeon and former deputy minister
- Fortune Chasi, politician and lawyer
- Prince James Mpande Ncube, architect, Pernell and Henry Mcckop, football players.

=== Faculty ===
- Andrew Shue, taught mathematics from 1989 to 1992
