= Suzanne Weyn =

American author (born 1955)

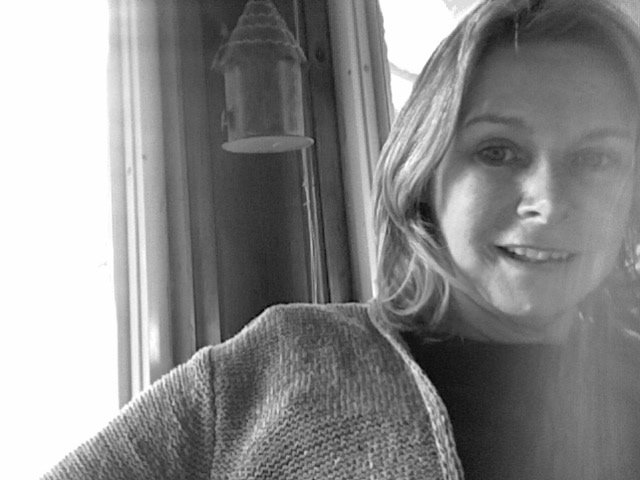
- Born: July 6, 1955 (age 71); Flushing, Queens, United States
- Education: Nassau Community College; Binghamton University
- Occupations: Novelist, editor
- Writing career
- Genres: Fantasy, Science fiction, Romantic comedy, Children's literature, Young adult fiction
- Notable works: The Bar Code Tattoo, The Bar Code Rebellion, The Bar Code Prophecy, Reincarnation
- Website: suzanneweynbooks.com

Suzanne Weyn (born July 6, 1955) is an American author. She primarily writes children's and young adult science fiction and fantasy novels and has written over fifty novels and short stories. She is best known for The Bar Code Tattoo, The Bar Code Rebellion and The Bar Code Prophecy. The Bar Code Tattoo has been translated into German, and in 2007 was nominated for the Jugendliteraturpreis for youth literature given by the German government. It was a 2007 Nevada Library nominee for Young Adult literature and American Library Association 2005 Quick Pick for Reluctant Young Adult Readers.

== Books and novels ==
- Return to Cybertron
- The Revenge of the Decepticons
- Snow White and the Seven Dwarfs (based on the 1937 film)
- The Day the Frogs Came to Lunch
- Love Song
- Little Women Diary
- Into the Dream
- All Alone in the Eighth Grade
- Elliot's Ghost
- My Brother, the Ghost
- Jeepers Creepers (House of Horrors 3)
- Catch That Kid (film novelization)
- Mission without Permission
- The Renaissance Kids
- The Museum Chase
- Sleepover (film novelization)
- An Amazing Journey
- The Night Dance: a Retelling of The Twelve Dancing Princesses, Simon Pulse
- South Beach Sizzle, with Diana Gonzalez, Simon Pulse
- Water Song: A Retelling of The Frog Prince, Simon Pulse
- Snowflake
- Gracie (film novelization)
- Mr. Magorium's Wonder Emporium (film novelization)
- Reincarnation, Scholastic
- The Crimson Thread: A Retelling of Rumpelstiltskin, Simon Pulse
- Indiana Jones and the Temple of Doom (juvenile film novelization)
- The Diamond Secret: A Retelling of Anastasia, Simon Pulse
- Distant Waves: A Novel of the Titanic, Scholastic
- Empty, Scholastic
- Invisible World, Scholastic
- Faces of the Dead, Scholastic
- Bionic, Scholastic
- Snapstreak, Houghton Mifflin Harcourt
- Novels in the Baby-Sitters Club series (ghostwritten), Scholastic

=== The Bar Code Tattoo Trilogy ===
- The Bar Code Tattoo, 2004, Scholastic Point Thriller
- The Bar Code Rebellion, 2006, Scholastic Point Thriller
- The Bar Code Prophecy, 2012, Scholastic

=== The Haunted Museum Series ===
- The Titanic Locket, 2013, Scholastic
- The Phantom Music Box, 2014, Scholastic
- The Pearl Earring, 2015, Scholastic
- The Cursed Scarab, 2015, Scholastic
