= Beneath the Blue =

- Theatrical release poster
- Directed by: Michael D. Sellers
- Written by: Wendell Morris
- Produced by: Susan Johnson
- Starring: Paul Wesley; Caitlin Wachs; Ivana Miličević; Michael Ironside; Christine Adams; George Harris
- Cinematography: Guy Livneh
- Edited by: Mark Linthicum; Bailey Williams
- Music by: Alan Derian
- Distributed by: Monterey Media; Quantum Entertainment
- Release date: October 24, 2010
- Running time: 103 minutes
- Countries: United States; United Kingdom
- Language: English

Beneath the Blue, also known as Way of the Dolphin, is a 2010 American drama film distributed by Monterey Media and Quantum Entertainment, a sequel to the 2007 film Eye of the Dolphin. The film was written by the same writer as its predecessor, Wendell Morris. The film stars Paul Wesley, Caitlin Wachs, and David Keith. A then-unknown Samantha Jade makes her film debut. The film was released on October 24, 2010.

== Plot ==
Dolphin researchers suspect the US Navy's sonar program is causing dolphin deaths. When the US Navy abducts a scientific research dolphin, a teenage dolphin researcher, Alyssa Hawk, risks getting caught to save the dolphin.

== Cast ==
- Paul Wesley as Craig Morrison
- Caitlin Wachs as Alyssa Hawk
- Ivana Miličević as Gwen
- Michael Ironside as Blaine
- Christine Adams as Tamika
- George Harris as Daniel
- David Keith as Dr. Hawk
- Samantha Jade as Kita
- Leah Eneas as Duvey
