= CafeMom =

Website for mothers

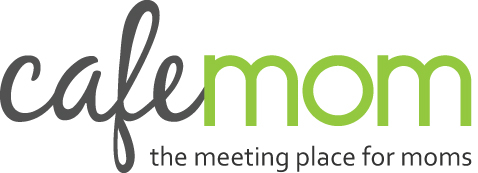
- Company type: Private
- Available in: English
- Headquarters: New York City, United States
- Owner: Wild Sky Media
- Founders: Michael Sanchez; Andrew Shue
- Website: www.cafemom.com
- Registration: Optional
- Launched: December 2006; 19 years ago
- Current status: Online

Logo for The Stir

CafeMom is a website targeted at mothers and mothers-to-be. It is owned by Wild Sky Media, which also owns Mom.com, MamásLatinas, and LittleThings.

== History ==
CafeMom was founded in 2006 by Michael Sanchez and Andrew Shue. In 1999, the childhood friends established CMI Marketing and, subsequently, ClubMom, the predecessor to CafeMom. ClubMom was a website that provided parenting information in the form of blogs, articles and message boards. It also organized a shopping rewards program with sponsors. ClubMom ran until 2007, when it was shuttered in favor of CafeMom.

CafeMom launched on November 15, 2006. Many ClubMom members were encouraged to join CafeMom to help it succeed. Shortly after its launch, it was described as a "MySpace for moms".

The idea of CafeMom originated with Andrew Shue when he became a father and he saw how his wife counted on other mothers for support and information. Shue and Sanchez realized that there was a need for mothers to share and talk with other women, and there was nothing out there that was bringing them together.

Michael Sanchez was named the CEO of the company before it launched. Within one year of its launch, CafeMom became the most trafficked website for women, according to comScore.

In 2008, the website was receiving 8 million unique visitors a month, accounting for over 140 million page views.

In September 2008, the website launched an initiative to donate $10 million to schools, while increasing traffic to the site.

In 2009, the website launched a games section.

On March 30, 2010, CafeMom announced the launch of The Stir, a blog for moms featuring topics such as celebrity gossip, parenting dilemmas, current events, and home decorating. It provides articles about parenting and issues surrounding children that members can comment upon and discuss. It also links to related stories on the site, as well providing links to similar articles in the press, and gives links to Twitter and Facebook, where members can continue the debate. Suburban Turmoil’s Lindsay Ferrier is a fashion columnist for the journal, after selling her style blog, "She’s Still Got It", to CafeMom. The blog is interactive, allowing CafeMom followers to write in and ask questions, appeal for fashion advice and discuss trends.

In 2010, the blog named Tina Fey as "Sexiest Mom Alive". In 2010, the site had $30 million in revenue.

As of June 2010, the site offered 70,000 separate groups on topics ranging from astrology to gardening.

In August 2010, Yahoo! evaluated acquiring CafeMom for as much as $100 million. CMI Marketing and Yahoo negotiated over the price. Other interested companies included The Walt Disney Company.

In May 2011, the website launched Daily Deals and announced plans for a hispanic website. At that time, the website had 100 employees, $36 million in annual revenue, and 7.6 million unique monthly visitors.

By 2012, the website was receiving 9 million monthly unique visitors and launched a YouTube channel. The YouTube channel offers workout videos and heartwarming stories.

In June 2018, Wild Sky Media acquired the website.
