= Elisabeth Shue =

American actress (born 1963)

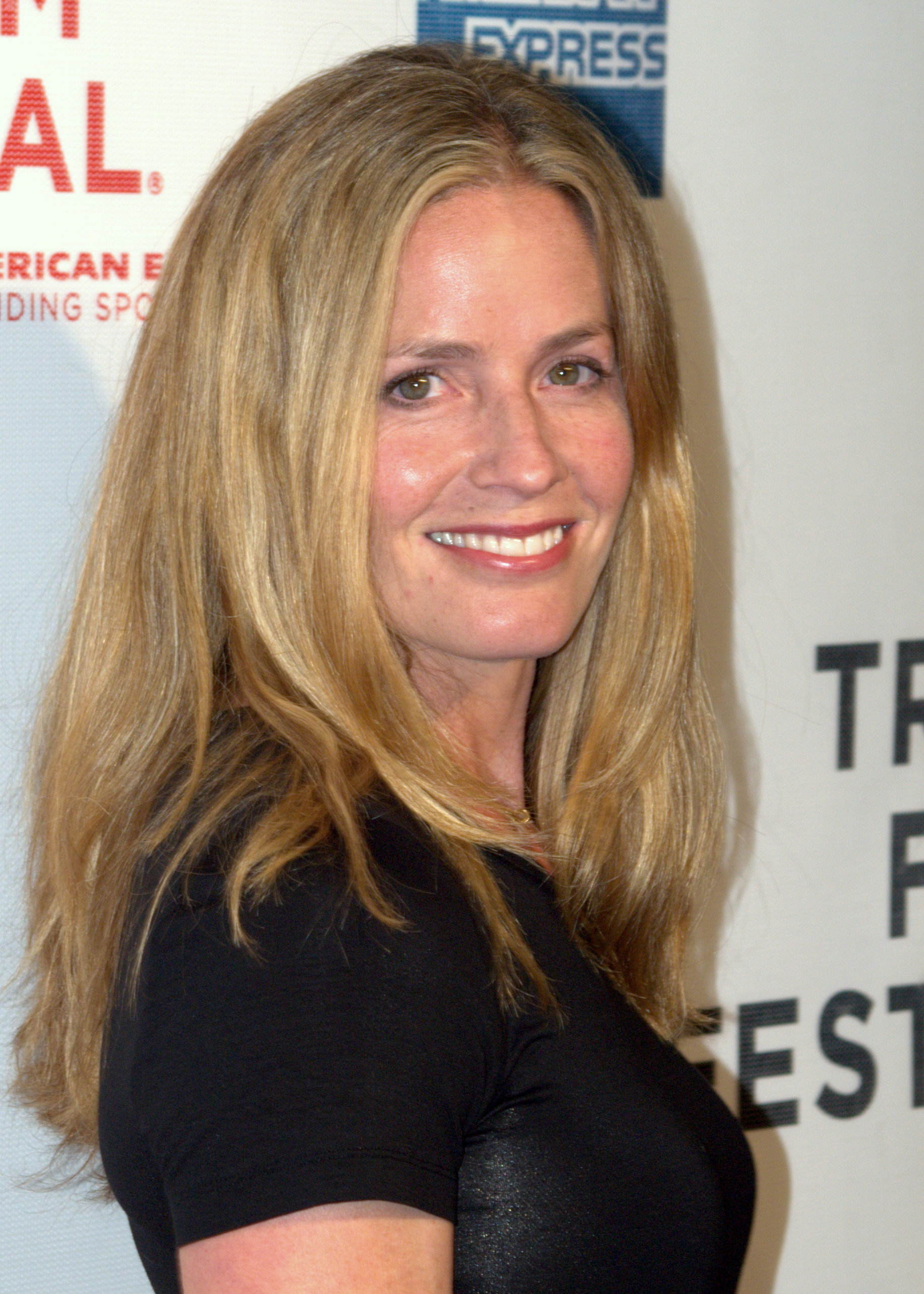
- Shue at the 2009 Tribeca Film Festival
- Born: October 6, 1963 (age 63); Wilmington, Delaware, U.S.
- Other name: Lisa Shue
- Education: Wellesley College (attended); Harvard University (AB)
- Occupation: Actress
- Years active: 1982–present
- Spouse: Davis Guggenheim (m. 1994)
- Children: 3
- Relatives: Andrew Shue (brother)

Elisabeth Shue (born October 6, 1963) is an American actress. She has starred in films such as The Karate Kid (1984), Adventures in Babysitting (1987), Cocktail (1988), Back to the Future Part II (1989), Back to the Future Part III (1990), Soapdish (1991), Leaving Las Vegas (1995), The Saint (1997), Hollow Man (2000), Piranha 3D (2010), Battle of the Sexes (2017), Death Wish (2018), and Greyhound (2020). For her performance in Leaving Las Vegas, she was nominated for the Academy Award, BAFTA, Golden Globe, and SAG Award for Best Actress.

On television, Shue played Julie Finlay in the CBS procedural forensics crime drama thriller CSI: Crime Scene Investigation (2012–2015), and Madelyn Stillwell in the Amazon Prime Video satirical superhero series The Boys (2019–2020, 2026). She reprises her role in the animated series The Boys Presents: Diabolical (2022) and the spin-off series Gen V (2023). She also leads the Netflix dramedy series On the Verge (2021).

== Early life and education ==
Shue was born on October 6, 1963, in Wilmington, Delaware, the daughter of Anne Brewster (née Wells, later Palmer), and James William Shue, a one-time congressional candidate, lawyer, and real-estate developer, who was president of the International Food and Beverage Corporation. Her mother was a vice president in the private banking division of the Chemical Bank.

Shue grew up in South Orange, New Jersey. Her parents divorced when she was nine. Shue's mother is a descendant of Pilgrim leader William Brewster, while her father's family emigrated from Germany to Pennsylvania in the early 19th century. Shue was raised with her three brothers (William, Andrew, and John) and was very close to them. Her younger brother Andrew is also an actor, best known for his role as Billy Campbell in the Fox series Melrose Place. Shue graduated from Columbia High School in 1981 in Maplewood, New Jersey, where Andrew and she were inducted into the school's hall of fame in 1994. Shue has two half-siblings from her father's remarriage, Jenna and Harvey Shue.

After graduating from high school, Shue attended Wellesley College. She then transferred to Harvard University in 1985, from which she withdrew in her senior year to pursue her acting career, a few credits shy of earning her degree. Over a decade later, in 2000, Shue returned to Harvard and completed her bachelor of arts in government.

== Career ==
=== 1980s and early 1990s ===
During her studies at Columbia High School and after her parents' divorce, Shue began acting in television commercials, becoming a common sight in advertisements for Burger King, also featuring future stars Sarah Michelle Gellar and Lea Thompson (with whom Elisabeth would later co-star in both television and film), DeBeers diamonds, Chewels bubble gum, and Best Foods/Hellmann's mayonnaise. She had small parts, credited as Lisa Shue, in The Royal Romance of Charles and Diana (1982) and Somewhere, Tomorrow (1983), which provided an early starring role for Sarah Jessica Parker.

Shue made her feature-film debut in 1984, when she co-starred opposite Ralph Macchio in The Karate Kid as Ali Mills, a high-school cheerleader and the love interest of Macchio's main character. Shue was a series regular as the teenaged daughter of a military family in the short-lived television series Call to Glory between 1984 and 1985, which she followed in 1986 starring alongside Terence Stamp in the British horror film Link. In 1987, Shue appeared in the television movie Double Switch (part of the Disney Sunday Movie series), co-starring with George Newbern, who went on to support her in her first star vehicle, the hugely popular Adventures in Babysitting, in the same year.

In 1988, Shue starred in Cocktail as the love interest of Tom Cruise's lead character. The following year, she starred in the short film "Body Wars", which was used at Epcot in an ATLAS Simulator attraction in the Wonders of Life Pavilion until 2007. Other roles followed, including appearing as Jennifer Parker in Back to the Future Part II (1989) and Back to the Future Part III (1990), where Shue replaced Claudia Wells, who declined to reprise the role from Back to the Future due to her mother's illness. Around this time, her older brother, William, died in an accident on a family holiday. Although her career was on the rise with her playing lead roles, Shue elected to take on the smaller supporting role of Jennifer in these sequels to allow her to deal with her family loss. The sequels were filmed back to back, and Shue featured prominently in Part II, appearing in bookend pieces in the third part of the trilogy.

Shue auditioned for the Ione Skye role in Say Anything... (1989), being a runner-up along with Jennifer Connelly.

In May 1990, Shue made her Broadway debut in Some American Abroad at the Lincoln Center. The following year, Shue returned to cinema, when she appeared in the comedies The Marrying Man with Kim Basinger and Alec Baldwin, and Soapdish with Sally Field, Robert Downey Jr., Kevin Kline, Cathy Moriarty, and Whoopi Goldberg.

Between 1992 and 1994, Shue appeared in a variety of supporting roles in both film and television. These included the comedy Twenty Bucks (reuniting with Christopher Lloyd from Back to the Future), noir thriller The Underneath, a guest appearance in Dream On, and the romantic comedy Heart and Souls (reuniting with Robert Downey, Jr.). She also returned to Broadway in 1993, performing in Tina Howe's production of Birth and After Birth.

=== 1995–present ===
Although often cast as a girl-next-door type, in a career-defining role, Shue starred as a prostitute in the 1995 film Leaving Las Vegas with Nicolas Cage. The role earned her an Academy Award nomination for Best Actress. Shue was also nominated for a BAFTA, Golden Globe, and SAG Award for Best Actress, and won Best Actress at the Independent Spirit Awards, Los Angeles Film Critics Association Awards, and National Society of Film Critics Awards.

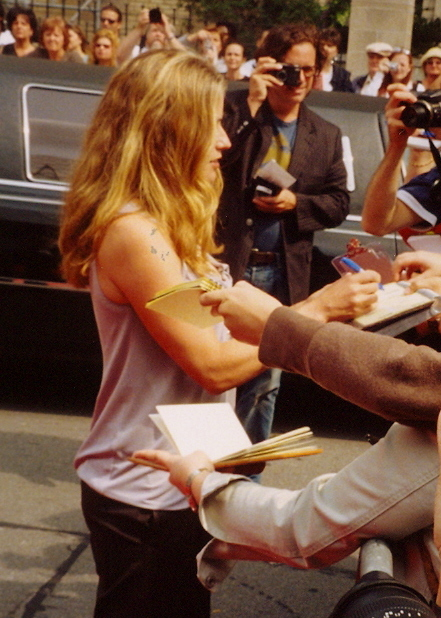
Shue at the premiere of Dreamer at the 2005 Toronto International Film Festival

Shue's career flourished after her Oscar nomination, landing her diverse roles. She starred in The Trigger Effect in 1996. Woody Allen's Deconstructing Harry (1996) showcased her comedic abilities among heavyweight co-stars Billy Crystal, Demi Moore, Robin Williams, and Stanley Tucci. Shue also displayed some action-movie skills in the 1997 spy remake The Saint opposite Val Kilmer. The thriller Palmetto (1998) afforded her the chance to play a film noir-ish femme fatale opposite Woody Harrelson; Shue co-starred in Cousin Bette (1998) with Jessica Lange, and Paul Verhoeven's Hollow Man (2000) with Kevin Bacon proved another summer blockbuster.

In 1999, Shue starred as the titular Molly as an autistic young woman placed into the care of her unwilling bachelor brother, played by Aaron Eckhart. Shue played a mother who reveals her dark past to her teenaged daughter in the 2001 ABC movie Oprah Winfrey Presents: Amy and Isabelle. Shue has since stated she was "extremely proud of that film, which no one ever saw, so it's a good lesson that you do work for yourself and not necessarily for the end result".

Shue starred in Leo (2002) with Joseph Fiennes and Dennis Hopper, Mysterious Skin (2004) opposite Joseph Gordon-Levitt, Hide and Seek (2005) opposite Robert De Niro and Dakota Fanning, and Dreamer (2005) again opposite Dakota Fanning and Kurt Russell.

In 2007, Shue and her brothers, Andrew and John, produced Gracie. Her husband, Davis Guggenheim, also produced and directed. Shue played the mother of the main character, who was loosely based on her own experiences as the only girl on a boys' soccer team. Andrew also appeared as the soccer coach, and her previous co-star from The Trigger Effect, Dermot Mulroney, played the father of the main character. Andrew initially conceived of it as a story about their late brother William, who was the captain of the high school soccer team; he died in a freak accident while the family was on a vacation in 1988. The older brother character of Johnny was based on Will. Shue also starred in the little-seen First Born (2007) with British actor Steven Mackintosh.

In 2008, Shue starred in Hamlet 2 as a fictionalized version of herself. In the film, she has quit acting to become a nurse, and is the favorite actress of Dana Marschz (Steve Coogan). In 2009, Shue appeared on the seventh season of HBO's Curb Your Enthusiasm as an actress competing with Cheryl Hines's character for the part of George's ex-wife for the Seinfeld reunion. That same year, she starred alongside Thomas Haden Church in Don McKay.

In 2010, Shue starred in Piranha 3D as Sheriff Julie Forester. She also played the former groupie mother of Abigail Breslin in Janie Jones, and a psychologist in Waking Madison alongside Sarah Roemer and Imogen Poots.

In 2012, Shue appeared in three wide-release theatrical films - the thriller House at the End of the Street with Jennifer Lawrence, Curtis Hanson's Chasing Mavericks opposite Gerard Butler, and David Frankel's Hope Springs as Karen the bartender in a cameo scene with Meryl Streep.

In 2012, Shue returned to television in a series regular role when she joined the cast of season 12's CSI: Crime Scene Investigation as Julie Finlay opposite Ted Danson, and replacing Marg Helgenberger. Finlay is the newest CSI, who just finished anger-management classes. Shue continued in the role until the end of season 15, when her character's fate was left hanging in the balance, later revealed in the two-part 2015 TV movie wrap-up finale of the entire series to have died (Shue did not appear). During her time on the series, being a massive tennis fan, as well as regular tennis player, Shue jokingly suggested to the producers they have an episode centered around a murder at a tennis tournament. In season 13, her wish was granted, and her friends and former pros-turned-commentators, 18-time Grand Slam champion Chris Evert, three-time Grand Slam winner Lindsay Davenport, and two-time mixed doubles Slam champ Justin Gimelstob, appeared in an episode as themselves. Shue also reunited with Back to the Future alumna Lea Thompson, who guest-starred in an episode of season 14.

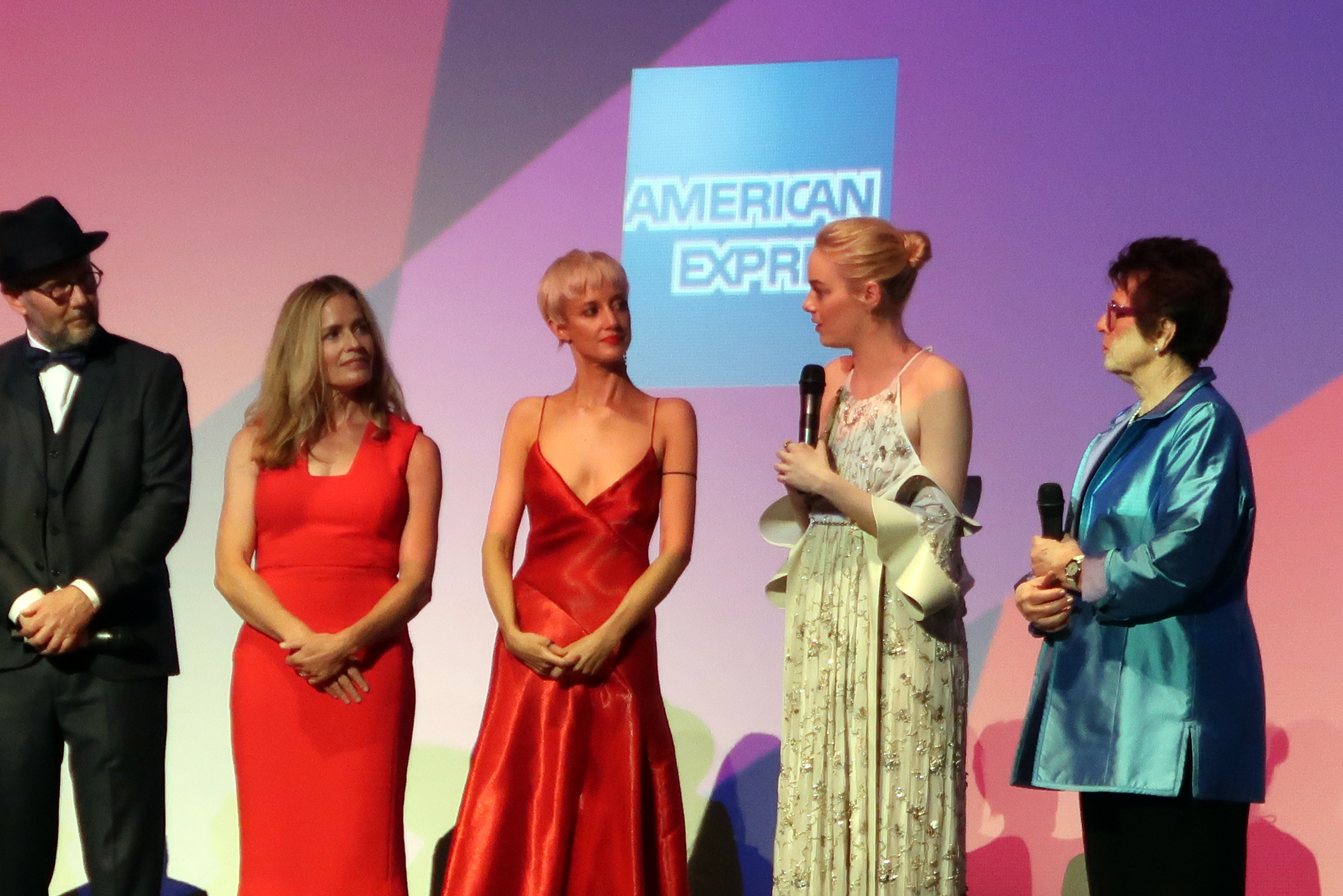
From left to right: Jonathan Dayton, Shue, Andrea Riseborough, Emma Stone, and Billie Jean King at the European premiere of Battle of the Sexes in 2017

In 2014, Shue appeared as a cougar in Behaving Badly along with Selena Gomez, Nat Wolff, and Heather Graham. In 2015, she guest-starred in an episode of the Patrick Stewart series Blunt Talk.

In 2017, Shue provided a strong supporting role in Battle of the Sexes, opposite Steve Carell and Emma Stone. She had originally signed on as a tennis adviser for the film, which recounts the 1973 showdown between female player Billie Jean King and former men's champ Bobby Riggs.

In 2018, Shue co-starred in Eli Roth's remake of Death Wish opposite Bruce Willis as his ill-fated wife. In the movie, she was also reunited with Vincent D'Onofrio, who appeared in Adventures in Babysitting with her.

In 2019, Shue took leading roles, as Madelyn Stillwell in the American superhero drama television series, The Boys, with Karl Urban and Jack Quaid, and the TNT television pilot Constance, playing a corrupt former beauty queen. In the latter, she was one of the executive producers along with Robert Downey, Jr. (with whom she previously co-starred in Soapdish and Heart and Souls) and his wife Susan Downey, among others. Constance was not going forward to series, so whether the pilot will air as a television movie is unknown.

Shue starred in Greyhound opposite Tom Hanks, released in 2020. That same year, she reprised her Karate Kid role as Ali Mills for a guest appearance in the sequel series, Cobra Kai, alongside her original co-stars Ralph Macchio and William Zabka.

== Personal life ==
Shue married film director Davis Guggenheim in 1994; they have three children together. Shue gave birth to their first child, a son named Miles, on November 11, 1997. Their first daughter Stella followed on March 19, 2001. Their second daughter, third and final child, Agnes Charles, was born on July 2, 2006. In 2004, Shue and Guggenheim sold their Sunset Strip house for $1.3 million.

== Filmography ==
=== Film ===
Year	Title	Role	Notes
1983	Somewhere, Tomorrow	Margie	
1984	The Karate Kid	Ali Mills	
1986	Link	Jane Chase	
1987	Adventures in Babysitting	Chris Parker	
1988	Cocktail	Jordan Mooney	
1989	Back to the Future Part II	Jennifer Parker	
1990	Back to the Future Part III	Jennifer Parker	
1991	The Marrying Man	Adele Horner	
1991	Soapdish	Lori Craven / "Angelique"	
1993	Heart and Souls	Anne	
1993	Twenty Bucks	Emily Adams	
1994	Radio Inside	Natalie	
1995	The Underneath	Susan Crenshaw	
1995	Leaving Las Vegas	Sera	Nominated for Academy Award for Best Actress
1996	The Trigger Effect	Annie Kay	
1997	The Saint	Dr. Emma Russell	
1997	Deconstructing Harry	Fay	
1998	Palmetto	Mrs. Donnelly / Rhea Malroux	
1998	City of Angels	Pregnant woman	Uncredited Cameo
1998	Cousin Bette	Jenny Cadine	
1999	Molly	Molly McKay	
2000	Hollow Man	Linda McKay	
2002	Leo	Mary Bloom	
2002	Tuck Everlasting	Narrator (voice)	
2004	Mysterious Skin	Ellen McCormick	
2005	Hide and Seek	Elizabeth Young	
2005	Dreamer	Lilly Crane	
2007	First Born	Laura	
2007	Gracie	Lindsay Bowen	Also producer
2008	Hamlet 2	Herself	
2009	Don McKay	Sonny	
2010	Piranha 3D	Julie Forester	
2010	Janie Jones	Mary Ann Jones	
2011	Waking Madison	Dr. Elizabeth Barnes	
2012	Hope Springs	Karen, The Bartender	
2012	House at the End of the Street	Sarah Cassidy	
2012	Chasing Mavericks	Kristy Moriarity	
2014	Behaving Badly	Pamela Bender	
2017	Battle of the Sexes	Priscilla Wheelan Riggs	
2018	Death Wish	Lucy Kersey	
2020	Greyhound	Eva Frechette	
2023	The Good Half	Lily Wheeland	
2026	Whalefall	Zara Gardiner	
TBA	Greyhound 2 †	Eva Frechette	Filming

=== Television ===
Year	Title	Role	Notes
1982	The Royal Romance of Charles and Diana	Lynn Osborne	Television film
1984–1985	Call to Glory	Jackie Sarnac	Main role
1987	Wonderful World of Color	Kathy Shelton	Episode: "Double Switch"
1992	The General Motors Playwrights Theater	Alice Adams	Episode: "Hale the Hero"
1993	Dream On	Maura Barish	Episode: "Oral Sex, Lies and Videotape"
1994	Blind Justice	Caroline	Television film
2001	Amy & Isabelle	Isabelle Goodrow	Television film
2009	Curb Your Enthusiasm	Virginia	Episodes: "Officer Krupke", "Seinfeld"
2012	American Dad!	Detective Lacey Sole (voice)	Episode: "Less Money, Mo' Problems"
2012–2015	CSI: Crime Scene Investigation	Julie Finlay	Main role
2015	Blunt Talk	Suzanne Mayview	Episode: "The Queen of Hearts"
2019–2020, 2026	The Boys	Madelyn Stillwell	Main role (season 1), guest (seasons 2 & 5); 10 episodes
2019	Constance	Constance Young	Television film
2021	Cobra Kai	Ali Mills	Guest role (season 3)
2021	On the Verge	Anne	Main role (season 1); also executive producer
2022	Super Pumped	Bonnie Kalanick	Main role
2022	The Boys Presents: Diabolical	Madelyn Stillwell (voice)	Episode: "One Plus One Equals Two"
2023	Gen V	Madelyn Stillwell	Episode: "God U."

=== Theme parks ===
Year	Title	Role	Notes
1989	Body Wars	Dr. Cynthia Lair	Disney attraction

== Awards and nominations ==
Year	Association	Category	Nominated work	Result
1984	Young Artist Awards	Best Young Supporting Actress in a Motion Picture, Musical, Comedy, Adventure or Drama	The Karate Kid	Won
1986	Saturn Awards	Best Actress	Link	Nominated
1987	Paris Film Festival	Best Actress	Adventures in Babysitting	Won
1995	Awards Circuit Community Awards	Best Actress	Leaving Las Vegas	Won
1995	Independent Spirit Awards	Best Female Lead	Leaving Las Vegas	Won
1995	Dallas-Fort Worth Film Critics Association	Best Actress	Leaving Las Vegas	Won
1995	Chicago Film Critics Association	Best Actress	Leaving Las Vegas	Won
1995	Los Angeles Film Critics Association	Best Actress	Leaving Las Vegas	Won
1995	National Society of Film Critics	Best Actress	Leaving Las Vegas	Won
1995	Academy Awards	Best Actress	Leaving Las Vegas	Nominated
1995	BAFTA Awards	Best Actress in a Leading Role	Leaving Las Vegas	Nominated
1995	Golden Globe Awards	Best Actress – Motion Picture Drama	Leaving Las Vegas	Nominated
1995	Screen Actors Guild Awards	Outstanding Performance by a Female Actor in a Leading Role	Leaving Las Vegas	Nominated
1995	Chlotrudis Awards	Best Actress	Leaving Las Vegas	Nominated
1995	New York Film Critics Circle	Best Actress	Leaving Las Vegas	Nominated
