= Andrew Shue =

American actor (born 1967)

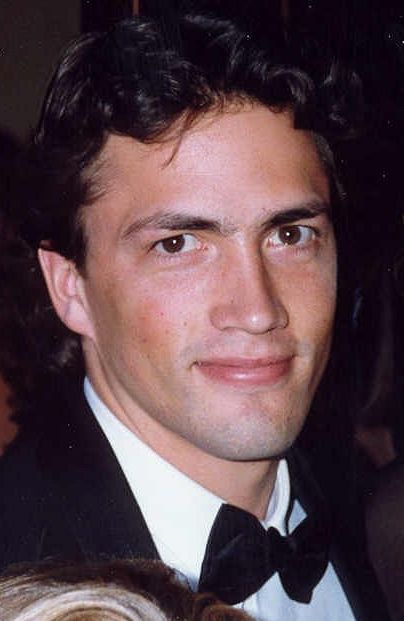
- Shue at the 1993 Emmy Awards
- Born: February 20, 1967 (age 59); Wilmington, Delaware, U.S.
- Education: Dartmouth College (BA)
- Occupation: Actor
- Years active: 1984–1998, 2007–2009
- Spouses: Jennifer Hageney (m. 1994; div. 2008) Amy Robach (m. 2010; div. 2023) Marilee Fiebig (m. 2026)
- Children: 3
- Parents: James W. Shue; Anne Brewster
- Relatives: Elisabeth Shue (sister)
Association football career
- Height: 5 ft 8 in (1.73 m)
- Position: Midfielder
College career
Years	Team	Apps	(Gls)
1985–1988	Dartmouth Big Green	53	(8)
Senior career*
Years	Team	Apps	(Gls)
1990	Bulawayo Highlanders		
1993	Los Angeles United (indoor)	1	(0)
1994	Anaheim Splash (indoor)	2	(0)
1996–1997	LA Galaxy	5	(0)
Total		8+	(0+)
- * Club domestic league appearances and goals

Andrew Shue (born February 20, 1967) is an American actor, known for his role as Billy Campbell on the television series Melrose Place (1992–1999). Shue played soccer professionally for several years. He co-founded and served on the board of directors of the global non-profit organization DoSomething, and co-founded the social networking website CafeMom.

== Early life ==
Shue was born in Wilmington, Delaware. His mother, Anne Brewster (née Wells, later Palmer; born 1938), is a bank executive who was the vice president of the private division of the Chemical Bank Corporation. His father, James William Shue (born 1936 – died May 24, 2013), was a lawyer and real estate developer who was the president of the International Food and Beverage Corporation and was active in Republican politics, having once unsuccessfully run for the U.S. Congress in New Jersey. His mother was a descendant of Pilgrim leader William Brewster and his father was of German ancestry, from Pennsylvania.

Shue's sister Elisabeth is an actress; in three of his early uncredited film appearances, he appeared with her in The Karate Kid, Cocktail and Adventures in Babysitting.

Shue attended Columbia High School in Maplewood, New Jersey. Along with his sister, he was inducted into the CHS Hall of fame in 1994. At Dartmouth College, Shue was a Regional All America soccer player and spent a winter studying and playing soccer in Glasgow, Scotland for Queen's Park FC. Shue received his B.A. in history from Dartmouth in 1989. After graduating, he visited Zimbabwe, where he simultaneously played soccer and taught high school math at Founders High School.

== Career ==
=== Acting ===
In May 1992, Shue was cast to play the role of Billy Campbell on the Aaron Spelling soap opera Melrose Place. He starred opposite Courtney Thorne-Smith, whom he later dated. Shue stayed on the show for six years. During this time, he appeared as an abusive husband in the Francis Ford Coppola film The Rainmaker, starring Matt Damon and Claire Danes.

A 1996 commercial for SportsCenter on ESPN has Shue being traded for former SportsCenter anchor Charley Steiner, where Steiner takes his position on Melrose Place and Shue takes his on SportsCenter.

He worked on the 2007 feature film, Gracie, with his sister Elisabeth, his brother John, and his brother-in-law, Davis Guggenheim, the Oscar-winning director of An Inconvenient Truth. Shue co-produced the film and also appeared in a minor role. It pays tribute to the Shue siblings' elder brother Will, who died in an accident in 1988. The story is loosely based on Elisabeth's childhood, when she was the only girl playing on an all-boys soccer team.

=== Soccer ===
During his time in Zimbabwe, Shue played for Bulawayo Highlanders. That season, the Highlanders won both Zimbabwe Premier Soccer League and CBZ Cup titles. At the time, Shue was the only white player in the Zimbabwe Premier Soccer League. In September 1993, he played one game with Los Angeles United of the Continental Indoor Soccer League. In July 1994, he played two games for the Anaheim Splash. In 1996, while still on Melrose Place, Shue played for the Los Angeles Galaxy of Major League Soccer, recording one assist in five games. He spent the entire 1997 season on injured reserve.

=== Entrepreneur ===
Along with his childhood best friend Michael Sanchez, Shue co-founded DoSomething. He now sits on the board of directors.

In 2006, Shue and Sanchez co-founded the social networking website CafeMom. Lead investors are Highland Capital Partners and Draper Fisher Jurvetson. The site used to provide an online community for moms to connect and share advice and ideas. CafeMom's community forums were shut down at 5:00 pm EST on May 24, 2018. The company cited high advertising costs as the reason for the shutdown. The CafeMom is now a family of companies, including blog The Stir, Baby Name Wizard and popular Latina site MamasLatinas.

Shue co-hosted the podcast "Mad Life" with his mother-in-law, Joan Robach, and comedian Chuck Nice.

== Personal life ==
Shue married floral designer Jennifer Hageney in 1994. They have three sons. They divorced in 2008.

In 2010, Shue married Good Morning America co-anchor and ABC News correspondent Amy Robach. She has two daughters from a previous marriage. It was reported he and Robach separated in August 2022 due to Robach's affair with T. J. Holmes. The divorce was reportedly finalized in March 2023.

By December 2023, Shue started dating Marilee Fiebig, the ex-wife of T.J. Holmes. Fiebig and Shue were married on November 1, 2026, in the groom’s home state of New Jersey. The couple celebrated with a reception at Shue’s farm near the banks of the Delaware River.

== Filmography ==
Film
Year	Title	Role	Notes
1984	The Karate Kid	Member of Cobra Kai (Peter)	Uncredited
1985	Vision Quest	Bar Patron	Uncredited
1987	Adventures in Babysitting	Extra	Uncredited
1988	Cocktail	Wedding Guest	Uncredited
1992	American Shaolin	Competitor	
1993	Gulf City	Jack Craig	TV movie
1997	The Rainmaker	Cliff Riker	
2007	Gracie	Coach Owen Clark	Also producer and writer
2009	Goal! III	N/A	Uncredited

Television
Year	Title	Role	Notes
1992	The Wonder Years	Brian Billings	Episode: "The Lost Weekend"
1992–1998	Melrose Place	Billy Campbell	Series regular, 191 episodes
