= Caitlin Wachs =

American actress

- Occupations: Actress, production assistant
- Years active: 1992–present

Caitlin Wachs is an American production coordinator and actress. She appeared alongside Ally Walker and Robert Davi on the NBC television series Profiler in the role of Chloe Waters. She went on to star as part of the ensemble cast of Divine Secrets of the Ya-Ya Sisterhood. Wachs played the president's daughter, Rebecca Calloway, on the ABC television series Commander in Chief.

== Filmography ==
=== Film ===
Year	Title	Role	Notes
1999	Shiloh 2: Shiloh Season	Dara Lynn Preston	
2000	My Dog Skip	Rivers Applewhite	
2000	The Next Best Thing	Rachel	
2000	Air Bud: World Pup	Andrea Framm	Direct-to-video film
2000	Thirteen Days	Kathy O'Donnell	
2002	Air Bud: Seventh Inning Fetch	Andrea Framm	Direct-to-video film
2002	Divine Secrets of the Ya-Ya Sisterhood	Young Vivi Walker	
2003	Inspector Gadget 2	Penny	Direct-to-video film
2005	Kids in America	Katie Carmichael	
2008	The Legend of Bloody Mary	Mary Worth	
2009	Endless Bummer	Anne	
2010	Privileged	Jill	Short film
2010	Beneath the Blue	Alyssa	
2013	National Lampoon Presents: Surf Party	Anne	
2014	The Hungover Games	Scary	

=== Television ===
Year	Title	Role	Notes
1992	Days of Our Lives	Jeannie Donovan	
1995	The Fresh Prince of Bel-Air	Penny Jillette	Episode: "Save the Last Trance for Me" (Season 5: Episode 21)
1995	The Bold and the Beautiful	Bridget Forrester	2 episodes
1996	Race Against Time: The Search for Sarah	Amy	Television film
1996	Shattered Mind	Molly	Television film
1996–1998	Profiler	Chloe Waters	Main role; 41 episodes
1997	Early Edition	Annie Anderson	Episode: "Home" (Season 2: Episode 1)
1998	To Have & to Hold	Anna McGrail	Recurring role; 7 episodes
1999	The Pretender	Faith Parker	Episode: "At the Hour of Our Death" (Season 3: Episode 14)
1999	Popular	Young Brooke McQueen	Episode: "Slumber Party Massacre" (Season 1: episode 5)
2000	Judging Amy	Grace Frame	Episode: "The Wee Hours" (Season 1: episode 16)
2000	Shasta McNasty	Chloe	Episode: "Play Dead, Clown" (Season 1: Episode 21)
2000	Phantom of the Megaplex	Karen Riley	Television film; Disney Channel Original Movie
2002–2003	Family Affair	Sigourney "Sissy" Davis	Main role; 15 episodes
2004	Cracking Up	Chloe Shackleton	Main role; 6 episodes
2005	I Married a Princess	Herself	Episode: "Malibu Charity Bash" (Season 1: Episode 2)
2005–2006	Commander in Chief	Rebecca Calloway	Main role; 18 episodes
2006	Shark	Cat Crosby	Episode: "Love Triangle" (Season 1: Episode 8)
2006	Masters of Horror	Angelique Burcell	Episode: "Pro-Life"
