= National Clinical Impact Award =

- Country: United Kingdom
- Presented by: National Health Service

National Clinical Impact Awards are awarded within the English National Health Service to consultants and academic GPs who perform 'over and above' the standard expected of their role. In January 2022 reforms were announced. There will be more awards but at lower levels. There are 3 levels rather than 4. They will still run for 5 years. There will be up to 600 awards granted each year with 70 national 3 awards worth £40,000 per year, 200 national 2 at £30,000 per year and 330 national 1 awards at £20,000 per year. For the first time those who work less than full time, mostly women, will get the full value instead of pro-rata. Local award schemes, managed by individual employers, are not affected.

The Clinical Excellence Awards scheme was established in 2003, which superseded the old Merit system that was established in 1948 with the inception of the NHS. There was a similar scheme in the NHS in Northern Ireland, but there has been no award scheme run for several years. In the Welsh NHS there are local commitment awards for consultants and a parallel national clinical impact award scheme. Wales has an additional National 0 award level to that in England, valued at £10,000 a year also for 5 years. In Scotland there is no longer a similar scheme. The prior scheme was run by the Scottish Advisory Committee on Distinction Awards. The schemes are intended to reward consultants who deliver a national impact over and above the expectations of their paid roles, thus showing commitment to the NHS.

== Administration ==
The administration of the scheme nationally is in the hands of the Advisory Committee on Clinical Impact Awards. There is a small DHSC Secretariat with the governance of the scheme overseen by a Chair and national Medical Director, both of whom are Public Ministerial Appointees. Between 2018 and 2024 during the reforms of the scheme the Chair was Dr Stuart Dollow and since 2020 the Medical Director has been Professor Kevin Davies. In 2024 Dr Vinay Patroe was appointed as the new Chair.

Local awards are administered solely by local NHS Trusts and not at any national level. There are 12 levels of award. Levels 1-8 are awarded locally in various formats by employing NHS Trusts, and levels 10-12 (silver, gold and platinum hereafter) were awarded nationally. These national awards have been replaced by the National 1 to 3 awards. Level 9 awards previously could be awarded locally by Trusts with the same value as a national bronze award, which was awarded nationally. In 2016-17 awards were worth £2,986 for level one, £35,832 for bronze, £47,110 for silver, £58,888 for gold and £76,554 for platinum annually. Payments for these awards were pensionable until 2018 for local awards and 2022 for national awards. Consultants have to reapply after 5 years. 25,300 consultants in England and Wales (54%) received a local or national excellence award in 2016-17. Radical changes or abolition were repeatedly suggested as part of the consultant contract negotiations from 2010 and in 2018 radical changes to the local scheme were agreed between NHS Employers and the British Medical Association. New points are now time limited for between one and three years, the award will not be pensionable and will paid annually by lump sum. Legacy awards are unchanged if awarded prior to 2018. These changes did not apply to the national scheme. The national scheme was itself reformed in 2022 to change from the 4 level Bronze to Platinum scheme, awarding 300 pensionable awards a year to the National 1-3 non pensionable scheme granting up to 600 awards of a lower value, to increase opportunity and diversity of the recipients.

Applicants provide evidence of national impact that must be dated and be within the last 5 years. The evidence is assessed in five areas:

- Domain 1 – Developing and Delivering a high quality service.
- Domain 2 – Improving the NHS through leadership.
- Domain 3 – Education, training and people development.
- Domain 4 – Innovation and Research.
- Domain 5 – Additional impact. Other evidence particularly related to NHS priorities or other health objectives

The nature of the scheme is balanced across evidence domains to give equal opportunities to reward academic and non academic clinicians being benchmarked against the expectations of their paid job plan.

The coalition government conducted a review of the scheme whose report was published in 2012.

== History ==
The earlier scheme of distinction awards was established at the foundation of the NHS in 1948 as part of Aneurin Bevan's efforts to win support from doctors by "stuffing their mouths with gold".

The Royal Commission on the National Health Service described the system of distinction awards in 1979. Awards were made on the advice of the Advisory Committee on Distinction, a predominantly professional body traditionally headed by a distinguished doctor. The total value of awards was about £20m per annum, 10% of total consultant remuneration. About half of all consultants received an award during their careers. At any one time, just over a third were award holders. There were four levels of award, with annual values ranging from £2,664 for level C with 3421 beneficiaries to £11,880 for A+ awards of which there were 140. Awards were then secret, and there was criticism that most went to consultants in teaching hospitals and the more glamorous specialities.

In 2015-16 £157 million was paid to 2,948 consultants in England and Wales. In 2016-17 £147 million was paid to 2,779 consultants. 300 awards were made in 2017.

In 2019 the Care Quality Commission suggested that awards should be withheld from doctors at trusts in special measures. This was however not a reflection of an official CQC position but it was posed as a question to Main Committee, who after discussion did not implement this to not disincentivise consultants working hard to improve performance at poor performing Trusts.
