= Vita =

Vita or VITA (pl.: vitae) is Latin for "life", and may refer to:

== People ==
- Vita (given name)
- Vita (surname)
- Vita (rapper), stage name of American rapper LaVita Raynor (born 1976)

== Fictional characters ==
- Vita (Nanoha), in the Magical Girl Lyrical Nanoha series
- Vita, a blue-haired girl in KidZania Mexican entertainment centers

== Places ==
- Vita, Manitoba, Canada, a small town
- Vita, Maharashtra, India, a small town
- Vita, Sicily, Italy, a city
- Viţa, a village in Nușeni Commune, Bistriţa-Năsăud County, Romania
- Vita, Ávila, Spain, a village

== Business ==
- FAW Vita, a car produced by the FAW Group
- Opel Vita, a car made by Opel
- Vita (brand), a brand name of the Hong Kong–based beverage company Vitasoy
- PlayStation Vita, a handheld game console by Sony

== VITA ==
- Views, Inventory, Transformation and Artefacts
- Virginia Information Technologies Agency
- IRS Volunteer Income Tax Assistance Program
- VMEbus International Trade Association

== Other uses ==
- Vita (electoral list), an Italian electoral list in the 2022 general election
- Vita: Life in a Zone of Social Abandonment, an ethnographic study by João Biehl
- Beta (letter) a.k.a. Vita (β), the second letter of the Greek alphabet
- A vita (Latin for "life") is a hagiography, a biography praising the life of a Christian saint

== See also ==
- Veta (disambiguation)
- Vitas (disambiguation)
