= Consumer Council =

Statutory authority in Hong Kong

- 消費者委員會

Agency overview
- Formed: 1974; 52 years ago
- Headquarters: 22/F, 191 Java Road, North Point, Hong Kong
- Agency executives: Paul Lam Ting-kwok, Chairman; Gilly Wong Fung-han, Chief Executive
- Website: consumer.org.hk/en

Consumer Council
- Traditional Chinese: 消費者委員會
Transcriptions
Yue: Cantonese
- Yale Romanization: Sīu fai jé wái yùhn wúi
- Jyutping: Siu1 fai3 ze2 wai2 jyun4 wui2

The Consumer Council is an independent statutory authority in Hong Kong, established in 1974 and formalised in April 1977 under the Consumer Council Ordinance (Cap. 216). Its role is to enhance consumer welfare and empower consumers to protect themselves. Over the course of the past four decades the expansion in the council's duties and services on consumer protection, such as the publishing of the CHOICE Magazine in 1976, the recent launch of online price-watching tools, and conducting studies on different aspects of the consumer market, have coincided with the socio-economic development of Hong Kong. Apart from being a consumer advisor, it has assumed the role as a key stakeholder in making of consumer-related policies.

The chairman, vice-chairman, and members of the council are all appointed by the Chief Executive of the HKSAR for renewable terms of two years.

== History ==
=== Overview ===
The establishment and development over the years of the Consumer Council have largely coincided with the socio-economic growth of Hong Kong.

The Consumer Council was established amidst the trend of the proliferation of statutory bodies in Hong Kong. In the 1970s, with the aim of improving the efficiency of governance, the Hong Kong government started establishing a large number of statutory bodies, which can be divided into five categories, namely: (i) policy committee, (ii) bodies that assist economic development, (iii) bodies that monitor socio-economic activities, (iv) bodies that monitor human rights situation, government performance, and reflect public opinions, and (v) bodies that carry out administrative orders. These independent and self-run statutory bodies are vested with power delegated by the government, which only sent official delegates to these bodies as mediators but not policy-instructors. They were also part of “the administrative absorption of politics” to secure policy legitimacy.

In 2003, to improve the “openness, effectiveness, representativeness and transparency” of statutory bodies, the Home Affairs Bureau issued a Consultation Paper on the Review of the Role and Functions of Public Sector Advisory and Statutory Bodies. In 2004, the Interim Report on the Review of the Classification System of Advisory and Statutory Bodies in the Public Sector designated the Consumer Council as a “non-departmental public bodies”, i.e. non-commercial entities that deliver public services at arm's length from the Government.

=== The 1970s: The Establishment of the Consumer Council ===
In light of the high inflation rate due to the global oil crisis in the 1970s, there were significant discrepancies in the qualities of essential daily necessities. Therefore, the Consumer Council was founded to protect the consumer by monitoring the quality of products and services on the market.

1974	The Establishment of the Consumer Council The Consumer Council was established in April 1974. At the establishment of the Consumer Council, it broadcast the “Daily Bulletin of Retail Prices of Major Foodstuffs” every morning on the radio, offering information on price comparison to consumers.
1975	The Launch of Diversified Services The Consumer Monthly Newsletter, the forerunner of the CHOICE Magazine, was first published in 1975, with an initial print of 30,000 copies for free distribution. Apart from publications, the Consumer Council opened two Consumer Advice Centres in Wan Chai and Sham Shui Po District Offices.
1977	Status of the Consumer Council The Consumer Council Ordinance (Cap.216) was enacted in 1977, and the council was formally incorporated into a statutory body, defining the council's functions and powers. The council has also become a member of the Consumers International (formerly known as the International Organization of Consumers Unions (IOCU)), an organization for consumer groups around the world.
1977 - 1979	Public Education At the international level, after joining the IOCU, the Council co-organized the first Consumer Education Seminar with IOCU with the theme of “the Law and the Consumer”. The seminar has engaged delegates from over 20 countries and regions. At the local level, the Council collaborated with the Education Bureau (formerly known as the Education Department) to create a consumer education teaching kit that was widely adopted in school education. Moreover, it has organised a series of seminars with diverse topics to promote consumer rights.

=== The 1980s: Foundation for the Consumer Protection Legislations ===
In the 1980s, Hong Kong's economy was in the transition from secondary production to tertiary production. Meanwhile, there was increased consumer awareness of service quality. As a result, the Council handled numerous complaints. With this in mind, the council had proposed numerous suggestions for various consumer protection laws.

1981 - 1989	Implementation of Key Consumer Protection Legislations The council has been advocating for the enactment of several consumer protection legislation. During this period, numerous consumer protection legislation such as the Trade Descriptions Ordinance and the Travel Agents Ordinance came into effect. Trade Descriptions Ordinance (Cap. 362) was enacted on 1 April 1981, aiming to prohibit false trade descriptions or misleading information about goods and services provided by traders. As for Travel Agents Ordinance (Cap. 218), it was enacted on 13 December 1985 with the aim to provide for the control and regulation of travel agents. However, due to the closure of major travel agencies between 1986 and 1987, the council's proposals for redress measures were accepted, and the Travel Agents Ordinance was amended accordingly. Further, the New Weights and Measures Ordinance (Cap. 68) was enacted on 1 January 1989 to provide units and standards of measurement and weighing equipment used for trade.

=== The 1990s: Foundation for Advocating Fair Competition in the Market and Enhanced Consumer Protection ===
With Hong Kong's rising status as the financial centre of Asia, the council had conducted various research on significant consumer and investor protection policies. As the Council plays an essential role in protecting consumer interests, the Council recognized that consumers might require assistance in pursuing their rights for consumer protection. Therefore, the Consumer Legal Action Fund was set up.

1991	Publicity Campaign The council launched an extensive publicity campaign to promote consumers' rights to the public with the slogan “Your consumer rights are in your hands. Speak up to fight for your rights!”. The advertisement with Dodo Cheng and Ng Man-tat had gained public recognition.
1994	The Consumer Legal Action Fund The Consumer Legal Action Fund was established in December 1994 with an initial grant of HK$10 million from the Government to facilitate consumer access to legal remedies through providing legal assistance to consumers. The council is the trustee of the Fund and is advised by a Management Committee on the merits of the cases seeking legal assistance under the Fund.
1997	Establishment of the Estate Agents Authority Followed by the council's recommendations on the licensing of estate agents to the Government, the Estate Agents Authority (“EAA”) was established in November 1997 with the enactment of the Estate Agents Ordinance (Cap. 511). Representatives of the council were appointed as members of the EAA's Committees and Working Groups.
1999	Co-organising the First Consumer Culture Study Award The Council started to co-organize the Consumer Culture Study Award with the Education Bureau in 1999. The award is designed for local secondary school students to explore consumer cultures, attitudes, and behaviours by generating study reports and collecting first-hand data.

=== The 2000s: Launch of Different Tools and Support ===
In the 2000s, Hong Kong was hit by SARS and a financial tsunami that had a massive impact on the economy. As a result, people became more concerned about the price of different products. The Council continued to provide information on product tests and launched different tools to assist consumers in their daily lives.

2008	Standardised Definition of Saleable Area The council and nine organisations jointly proposed the standardised method for measuring the saleable area in the 1980s. With the joint efforts, a standardised definition of “Saleable Area” took effect in October 2008 and was applicable to sales brochures and sales and purchase agreements. This helps potential buyers to gain more accurate information on the area of the property.
2009	Launch of the Auto-fuel Price Calculator In light of rising auto-fuel prices, the Council developed an online Auto-fuel Price Calculation in February, providing consumers with a platform to compare the auto-fuel prices of five local oil companies. Subsequently, in April, a mobile version of the Auto-fuel Price Calculator was launched.
2009	Launch of the Monthly Wet Market Food Price Index The council launched the Monthly Wet Market Food Price Index in September to monitor the price level of 26 food items in 44 wet markets across 18 districts. This laid a foundation for further development of the Online Price Watch.

=== The 2010s: The Council’s Focus in response to Technological Advancement ===
In the 2010s, online shopping became prevalent due to technological advancement. Therefore, consumers were more aware of sustainable consumption and personal data privacy. In response to the changing needs of consumers, the council also published information via diversified channels.

2010	The New Nutrition Labelling Scheme The new Nutrition Labelling Scheme came into effect on 1 July 2010, which helps consumers understand the nutritional content of food and make healthier food choices. The Council conducted surveys on the new Nutrition Labelling Scheme from March to July. Additionally, in collaboration with the Centre for Food Safety, the Council promoted the new scheme to the public.
2014	Celebrating the 40th Anniversary The Council celebrated its 40th anniversary with a series of events and educational programmes, such as the 40th Anniversary cocktail reception, where nearly 500 distinguished guests attended the event. Educational programmes, including a Comic Exhibition and an RTHK TV Programme, “Metropolitan Consumers”, were rolled out to discuss consumer protection issues in different generations.
2018	Launch of YouTube Channel The council has set up a YouTube channel where consumers can access information in different ways.
2019	Mainland Collaboration and Cross-border Co-operative Agreements with the Greater Bay Area Since there are frequent cross-boundary trades and consumer activities, the Council reached an agreement with the China Consumers’ Association (CCA) to build closer partnerships especially in handling consumer complaints. To enhance the cross-border cooperation in consumer protection and rights between Guangdong, Hong Kong, and Macau, the Council signed Memoranda of Understanding with 9 Mainland municipalities. This facilitates cooperation in the Greater Bay Area by providing an operational framework and arrangements for information exchange.
2019	Consumer Education for Senior Citizens Community talks targeted at senior citizens were held with social service organisations to educate senior citizens about consumer rights. Moreover, the Council collaborated with TVB to produce elderly health management-related content in the TV programme “Revel in Retirement” (無耆不有).

=== The 2020s: The Council Proactive Response to Coronavirus Pandemic ===
In 2020, Hong Kong was adversely affected by COVID-19 and faced an unprecedented challenge. Hence, the Council focused on testing various anti-epidemic products and providing the latest consumer information to consumers.

2020	Webpage “Together, We Fight the Virus!” A one-stop webpage, "Together, We Fight the Virus!", was launched to provide reliable and credible information for consumers on anti-epidemic products. In addition, the council has been conducting product tests on numerous anti-epidemic products such as disinfection alcohol, Rapid Antigen Test (RAT) kits and face masks. The public is free to download test findings of these anti-epidemic gears.
2020	Launch of the New "Oil Price Watch" A new Oil Price Watch was launched on both the website and mobile application with enhanced functions in November 2020. It offers information for consumers to check the auto-fuel retail prices of oil companies to help consumers choose among various kinds of promotions and discounts.

== Performance pledge ==
Same as many other statutory bodies, such as the Airport Authority Hong Kong, and governmental bureaus and departments, the Consumer Council sets up its performance pledge. The mechanism was modelled on the UK's citizen's charters and introduced by the government in Hong Kong in 1992 to instil a customer orientation mindset among the public sector and enhance the quality of public service. Performance reporting is an important means by which the Hong Kong government controls the operations of statutory bodies in a less intrusive manner to respect the bodies’ independence.

== Organisation structure ==
=== Overview ===
The operation of the Consumer Council is supported by a number of committees and working groups established to deal with specific areas of consumer issues, including products testing, information technology, trade practices, legal protection, etc. Members of the committees are professionals and stakeholders drawn from different sectors of the society to provide fair and just expertise. Full Council meetings are held on a bi-monthly basis.

=== Council Members ===
The chairman, Vice-chairman, and members are all appointed by the Government of the HKSAR for a term not exceeding 2 years. They may be reappointed upon the expiry of their respective terms of office. The current chairman and chief executive of the council are Paul Lam and Ms. Gilly Wong Fung-han respectively.

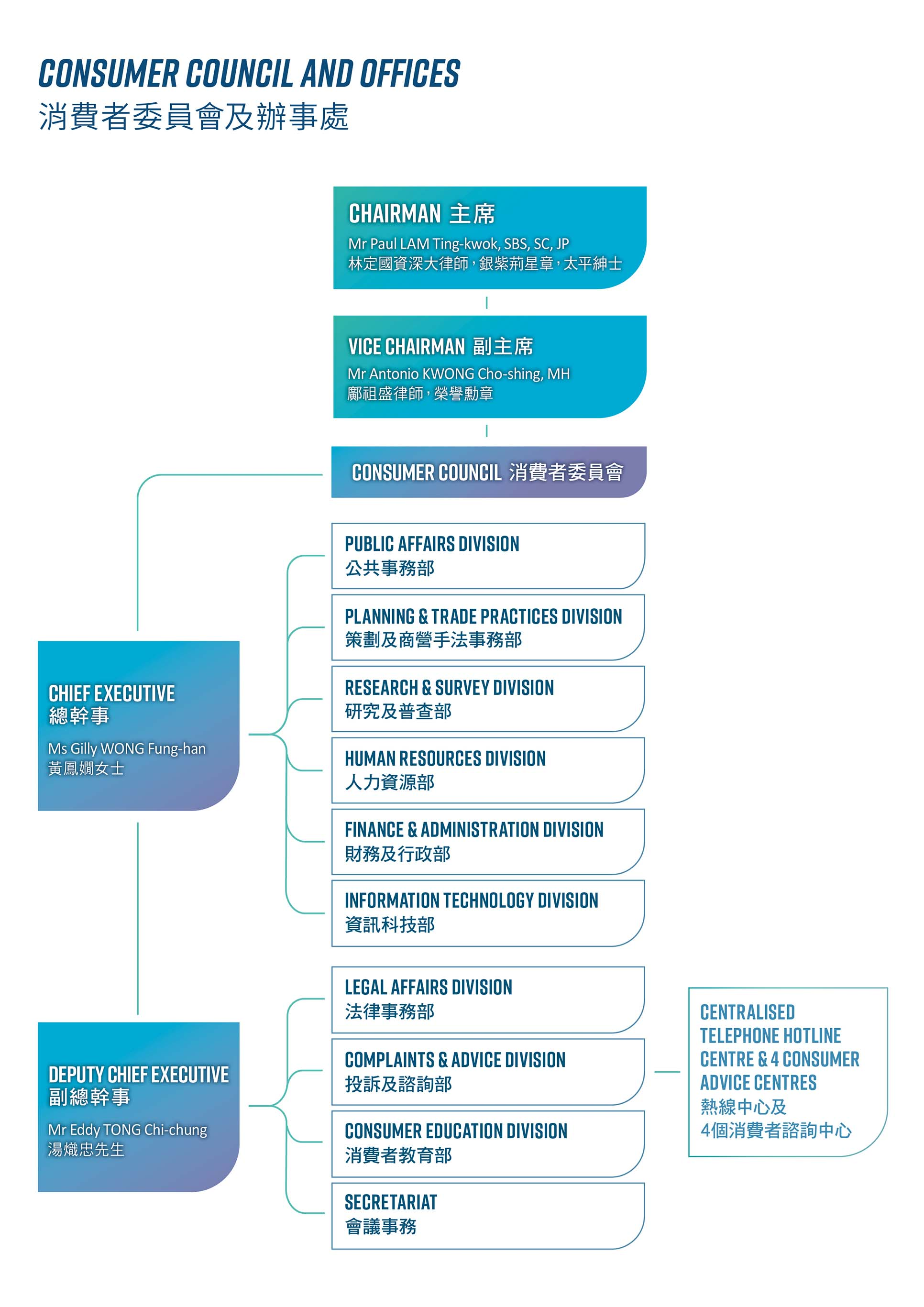
Consumer Council and Offices

=== Chairmen of the Council ===
Statutory bodies provide a basis for a certain extent of public participation in the policy process through the government's appointment. There has been academic discussion that the colonial government before and during the transitional period up to the Handover had been prioritising the interest of business and professional elites in the appointment of leaders of Hong Kong's advisory and statutory bodies. As shown below, some of the chairmen of the consumer rights-safeguarding Council pre-handover were affiliated with business or professional sectors (particularly legal service), with the remaining ones having political affiliations, and civil or public service experience.

No.	Period	Chairman	Occupation; Background
1	April 1974 - March 1975	Yuet-keung Kan	Banker, Politician, Lawyer
2	April 1975 – March 1980	Lo Kwee-seong	Businessman - founder of Vitasoy, Investor, Philanthropist, Politician - former unofficial member of the Urban Council and Legislative Council
3	April 1980 – October 1984	Gallant Ho Yiu-tai	Lawyer, Public service
4	October 1984 – October 1988	Selina Chow Liang Shuk-yee	TV executive, Politician - former chairperson of the pro-business Liberal Party
5	October 1988 – October 1991	Martin Lee Chu Ming	Politician, Lawyer
6	October 1991 – October 1997	Edward Chen	Educator - former president of Lingnan University
7	October 1997 – July 1999	Anna Wu Hung-yuk	Politician, Public service - former chairperson of MPFA, Current chairperson of the Competition Commission
8	September 1999 – September 2005	Andrew Chan Chi-fai	Business sector, Academic, Public service
9	September 2005 – June 2007	Ceajer Chan Ka-keung	Civil service - former Secretary for Financial Services and the Treasury; Academic - Adjunct Professor and Senior Advisor to the Dean at the HKUST Business School
10	July 2007 – June 2012	Anthony Cheung Bing-leung	Politician - former vice-chairperson of the Democratic Party; Civil service - former Secretary for Transport and Housing; Academic, Public service
11	June 2007 – February 2019	Wong Yuk-shan	Politician, Educator - former president of the Hong Kong Metropolitan University
12	February 2019 – July 2022	Paul Lam Ting-kwok	Barrister, Former Chairman of the Hong Kong Bar Association
13	July 2022 –	Clement Chan Kam-wing	Accountant, Former President of the Hong Kong Institute of Certified Public Accountants

From 2003 to 2006, the government did propose to widen the participation of various social groups, such as youth, women, ethnic minorities and people with disabilities, in statutory bodies. From the list above, whilst some of the appointees post-handover remain to be elites from different professions (particularly legal service) and business sectors, there were also politicians from across the spectrum, educators, and experienced individuals in the public sector.

=== Chief Executives of the Council ===
All of the Chief Executives of the council (former and current) have had experience in management in civil and public service, with their career spanning across different statutory bodies.

Period	Chief Executive	Occupation; Background
April 1974 – April 1984	Ms Macpherson Cheung Look Ping, Ophelia	Public service; Civil service
May 1985 – March 2007	Ms Chan Wong-shui Pamela	Consumer right activist; Academic
April 2007 – 15 November 2012	Ms Connie Lau Yin-hing	Started her career as a researcher for the council; Public service - former Ombudsman
16 November 2012 –	Ms Gilly Wong Fung-han	Management and public service - former General Manager of MICE & Cruise of the Hong Kong Tourism Board

== Finance ==
As a not-for-profit funded statutory body, the Consumer Council derives its income mostly from Government subvention through the operational expenses of the Commerce and Economic Development Bureau (Commerce, Tourism and Industry Branch). Meanwhile, proceeds from the sales of the CHOICE Magazine and interest income accounted for only a small portion, with 3.3% of the council's income in the Year 2020-2021 generated in this manner. The total recurrent and non-recurrent expenditures for the Year 2020-2021 were HK$132.49 million and HK$11.98 million respectively. For the fiscal year ended on 31 March 2021, the council was running at a financial surplus of HK$4,974,749. The current estimate for the council's expenditure in the fiscal year of 2021-2022 is around HK$133,919,000 as reported by the Financial Services and the Treasury Bureau to the Legislative Council in April 2022.

Whilst governmental funding provides a source of autonomy for statutory bodies like the Consumer Council, there has been scholarly discussion that such independence may be more symbolic than actual, as the amount of funding can limit the bodies’ operations.

== Publications ==
=== Study Reports ===
Since 1994, the council has been working on study reports covering competition in various industries to create a fair market for consumers. By disseminating information to consumers through in-depth market studies on trade practices, the Council published over 60 study reports from 1994 to 2021, featuring topics such as MPF Employee Choice Arrangement, first-hand residential property sales, and test reports on products that responded to public demand.

==== 1. Study Report on Purchase of Properties Outside Hong Kong ====
The Council published the study report titled “Purchase of Properties Outside Hong Kong – a Study on Enhancing Consumer Protection” in October 2021. In response to the popular demand for the purchase of properties outside Hong Kong (“POH”) in recent years, the Council found room for improvement regarding the regulation of POH and proposed recommendations to enhance consumer protection in the POH market.

==== 2. Study Report on Consumer Protection of Medical Beauty Services ====
The Council published the study report titled “Consumer Protection of Medical Beauty Services – A New Regulatory Regime” in December 2016. It discussed and studied critical issues in using medical beauty services. Following the scandal at a beauty centre in 2012, the Council conducted an in-depth study and proposed recommendations to avoid risks and severe consequences from malpractices in the medical beauty industry.

==== 3. The First Sustainable Consumption Report ====
The Council published its first sustainable consumption report titled “Sustainable Consumption for a Better Future – A Study on Consumer Behaviour and Business Reporting” in February 2016. It surveyed to develop a baseline understanding of consumers’ awareness, behaviours, and readiness toward sustainable consumption.

=== Shopping Guide ===
The Council released shopping guides on its website, providing tips and information when purchasing different products and services. It covers 12 categories:

1. Home Appliances;
2. Tech-savvy;
3. Food and Cooking;
4. Silver Hair Market;
5. Family and Kids;
6. Life and Financial Planning;
7. Features;
8. Green Living;
9. Health and Beauty;
10. Leisure and Environment;
11. Trivial; and
12. Tips.

=== CHOICE Magazine ===
CHOICE Magazine is a monthly magazine published by the council and the world's first consumer-related magazine in Chinese. It includes product tests, surveys and complaint cases. The first issue of CHOICE was published in 1976, with cooking oil as the first product test featured. As of 2022 April, CHOICE has already published 546 issues.

==== Key Developments ====
1976	Launch of CHOICE Magazine The CHOICE Magazine was launched in 1976 at the price of HK$1 per copy. The first product test featured in the first issue of CHOICE Magazine was cooking oils.
1984	Revamp of CHOICE Magazine From Issue 110 onwards, CHOICE Magazine went through a major revamp, including its content, layout, and cover design. In particular, it started to feature celebrities on the cover. For instance, Leslie Cheung appeared as the first cover star for CHOICE Magazine with cassette tapes as the focus test product.
1988	Record Sales of CHOICE Magazine In the August 1988 issue, CHOICE Magazine had a record-breaking circulation of 73,000 copies. The test report published in this issue was on condoms.
2004	Introduction of eCHOICE eCHOICE, the digital version of CHOICE Magazine was officially launched on 6 January 2004. Consumers can better access CHOICE Magazine online.
2018	The 500th Issue of CHOICE The 500th issue of CHOICE Magazine, published in June 2018, featured Ms Sarah Lee Wai Sze, the Olympics bronze medalist. Her determination and persistence echoed the effort of CHOICE in promoting consumer rights over the years.

=== Consultation Papers ===
The Council proposes suggestions to the Government and public bodies concerning different consumer issues and related legislation by releasing consultation papers.

==== Hong Kong Electricity Market ====
The Council submitted its consultation paper to the Environment Bureau regarding the future development of the electricity market in Hong Kong. In response to the document released by the Environment Bureau on 31 March 2015 (“Public consultation on the future development of the electricity market in Hong Kong”), the Council proposed a “gradual and progressive reform” and “Energy Efficiency Obligation” as a means to encourage a reduction in energy consumption.

==== Crypto-assets and Stablecoins ====
The Council submitted its consultation paper to the Hong Kong Monetary Authority on crypto-assets and stablecoins in March 2022. Given the high volatility of crypto-assets and stablecoins, it is crucial to ensure the regulatory framework stays intact with the market's ever-changing landscape. In light of the high-risk nature, the council has proposed several regulatory measures to protect investors, which include (i) enhancing information transparency; (ii) establishing complaint mechanisms; (iii) ensuring market stability; and (iv) enhancing consumer education and support.

== Consumer Council's Advocacy on Public Policies ==
Aside from being an active consumer advisory organisation, the Consumer Council is also a stakeholder in advocating for changes in consumer-related policies through its Study Reports and submissions to Consultation Papers. They have had varying degrees of influence and success in refining the policy and legal regimes on consumer protection.

=== Study Reports ===
==== Competition Legislations ====
Well before the enactment of the Competition Ordinance in December 2015, the Consumer Council has advocated for introducing a comprehensive competition policy and legal regime in Hong Kong to target anti-competitive behaviours for protecting consumers’ interests through the release of the study report, titled “Competition Policy: The Key to Hong Kong’s Future Economic Success”, in 1996.

Against the background that Hong Kong had undergone an economic structural change and transformed into a knowledge-based economy from the 1980s onwards, the Council identified that not all markets in the local service sectors (e.g. legal and accounting services, medical and dental services, public utilities, local radio and television broadcasting, retail banking services etc.) were highly competitive. As a result, the Council opined that a comprehensive competition legal framework should be introduced to “remove barriers to entry and ensure free competition”. In particular, the Council recommended that the proposed competition legislation should include provisions that protect consumers from (1) horizontal and vertical collusive agreements and (2) the abuse of dominant position, which was in-line with the EU competition law at that time. From an administration point of view, the council also recommends the establishment of (1) an independent Competition Authority outside the civil service to investigate and decide on possible breaches of the Competition Law, and (2) an Appeal Body to hear appeals against the Authority's decisions.

This Study eventually contributed to the establishment of the Competitive Policy Advisory Group in December 1997 to review competition-related matters. Further down the road, the Competition Ordinance was passed by the Legislative Council in June 2012, followed by the founding of the Competition Commission.

==== Malpractices in Consumer Transactions ====
By the turn of the century, the Consumer Council had its attention on misleading advertisements in Hong Kong. In July 1999, the Council started conducting a large-scale survey on the advertisements for major categories of products on mainstream media and examining complaints it received from consumers on questionable advertising. Subsequently, the Council published the Study Report entitled “Ways to Improve the Regulation of Advertising”, which suggested that the Government should, among other options, (i) amend the Trade Descriptions Ordinance to prohibit misleading information that would lead to a distortion of competition and may cause a consumer to take detrimental decisions in the course of transactions, and (ii) enact a Control of Misleading Advertisements Ordinance that was similar to the UK Control of Misleading Advertisements Regulations 1988 and the Advertising Law of the PRC 1994.

In May 2001, the Consumer Council issued a Study Report titled “Regulating Deceptive, Misleading and Unfair Practices in Consumer Transactions”. The Report noted the prevalence of deceptive and unfair sale practices in the supply of services and sale of goods, and the inadequacy of the existing laws to safeguard consumers from such business malpractices in Hong Kong.

In light of the context, the council made several recommendations on amending the Trade Descriptions Ordinance (Cap.362), the Summary Offences Ordinance (Cap.228), and the Unconscionable Contracts Ordinance (Cap.458). As short-term measures, these amendments would enlarge the enforceable scope and definition of the legislations so as to cover the identified malpractices in consumer transactions. In the long-run, the Report includes the council's suggestion that the Hong Kong government should enact a comprehensive trade practice legislation to prohibit businesses from conducting deceptive, misleading, unfair and oppressive trade practices during consumer transactions.

Thereafter, in his 2007-08 Budget, the then Financial Secretary Henry Tang commissioned the Consumer Council to conduct a holistic review of existing measures to protect consumer rights. In February 2008, the Council published the report entitled “Fairness in the Marketplace for Consumers and Business”, which highlights that the regulations on the adoption of standard form consumer contracts faired “below the standards found in comparable advanced economies”. The Council once again recommended the Government introduce a comprehensive Trade Practices legislation in Hong Kong to protect customers from unfair trade practices in service provision and the sale of goods. Following up on this Study Report, in January 2008, the Government introduced into the Legislative Council the Trade Descriptions (Amendment) Bill 2007, which extends the coverage of the existing Trade Descriptions Ordinance to “false trade descriptions of services, misleading omissions, aggressive commercial practices, bait advertising, bait-and-switch and wrongly accepting payment. The Bill was subsequently passed by the LegCo in July 2012, and the Trade Descriptions (Unfair Trade Practices) (Amendment) Ordinance 2012 came into effect in July 2013.

==== Energy Policies ====
Apart from its advocacy for changes in legal regimes, the Consumer Council also focused on the structure and competitiveness of the energy sector.

===== 1. Towngas and Liquified Petroleum Gas =====
In July 1995, the Council made a report on the towngas and liquified petroleum gas market in Hong Kong, entitled “Assessing Competition in the Domestic Water Heating and Cooking Fuel Market”. The Report noted that the Hong Kong and China Gas Company Limited (or Towngas) enjoyed a “natural monopoly” status due to technical, legal and cultural factors in the provision of water heating and cooking fuel in the local market. The phenomenon was exacerbated by the inelastic demand for towngas among local consumers, entailing the fact that consumers’ demand was not as responsive to price changes. A local scholar also suggested that Towngas had abused its market dominance to charge higher gas prices compared with most of the OECD countries, thus leading to its enjoyment of a significantly higher net profit margin compared with advanced economies, such as U.S., the U.K., and Japan etc.

Given that the infrastructure for manufacturing and distributing gas had been well-developed, the Council proposed that the Government should devise and adopt a “common carrier system” that enables new market entrants to gain access to the transmission piping network without heavy initial investments. Moreover, the council also advocated the adoption of, among others, a profit control mechanism, price-cap and price formula as regulatory tools to safeguard public interest whilst encouraging Towngas's investment and innovation.

The proposal of this Study Report was however rejected by the Government, claiming that the proposal would impose an “undue government interference” on the towngas market. The Government nevertheless entered into a three-year Information and Consultation Agreement (ICA) with Towngas in April 1997, detailing the consultation procedures Towngas needs to follow in the event of price review and adjustment. As of April 2022, ICA has been extended eight times, with the current Agreement entered into on 3 April 2021 and is effective until 2 April 2024.

===== 2. Auto-fuel =====
The local auto-fuel market is an area that the Consumer Council has consistently studied due to the unreasonably high price of auto-fuels in Hong Kong as perceived by the general public over the years. In January 2000, the Consumer Council released the report “A Study of Motor Gasoline, Diesel and LPG Markets in Hong Kong”. The Report indicates that the auto-fuel market in Hong Kong was oligopolistic, and sheds light on the possible lack of genuine price competition between the market players. The Council put forward its recommendations to the Government in the report of (1) encouraging new entry through tackling site retailing and storage issues, (2) providing more information to encourage price competition, and (3) improving government oversight of the industry. Since its proposal of establishing a Competition Authority had not been positively received by the Government, the Council in turn proposed in this Report the creation of an Energy Commission, which could be charged with the responsibility to oversee competition for the energy sector in Hong Kong.

In its study report entitled “Auto-fuel Price Monitoring Analysis” published in February 2015, the Council urged the Government to facilitate the disclosure of information on cost structure among the auto-fuel retailers.

The latest Auto-fuel Price Monitoring Analysis 2020 further revealed the phenomenon of “More Going Up, Less Coming Down” in pump prices from 2013 to 2020. The Council concluded that a thorough regulatory review by the government on the auto-fuel market and empowering the Competition Commission to investigate the market should be carried out. The Council conceded that the most it could do is to draw consumers’ attention to the different price information, and as part of the effort to improve market transparency and competition, by 2021, the Government had commissioned the council to release auto-fuel retail prices and information on various types of discounts offered by retailers on a weekly basis. That being said, there is no plan on the part of the Government to conduct a complete review or overhaul of the market.

==== Personalized Point-to-point Car Transport Service ====
In light of the increasing popularity of e-hailing in Hong Kong after Uber launched its service in 2014, the Government announced its plan to launch “franchised taxis” with “E-hailing” features in the 2017 Policy Address to address the legality issues and address the demand. Meanwhile, in November 2017, the Consumer Council released the Report entitled “A Study of the Competition in the Personalised Point-to-point Car Transport Service Market”. The Report indicated that passengers were dissatisfied with the quality of the taxi service, and that the Government's effort to implement a franchised taxis system would not be able to satisfy passengers’ desire for more choices in the ride-hailing service market. As such, the Council suggested that the Transport Department can regulate E-hailing services through providing three types of permits: (1) Franchised permit for E-hailing platform (with applicable conditions onto service providers), (2) Permit for E-hailing vehicle, and (3) Permit for E-hailing “partner” drivers.

As of April 2022, the Government's focus is on the enhancement of the quality of personalized and point-to-point transport services with legislative proposals to implement the Taxi Driver-Offence Points System.

=== Submissions to Consultation Papers ===
The Consumer Council regularly submits its views in response to the consultation papers issued by different governmental departments, statutory bodies and consultative bodies on the latest regulatory matters.

==== Regulating Crypto-assets and Stablecoins ====
Following the Hong Kong Monetary Authority's issuance of the Discussion Paper on Crypto-assets and Stablecoins in January 2022, the Council submitted its views and suggestions for protecting consumer interests. In particular, the submission lists out the council's recommendation of adopting appropriate regulatory measures with the likes of risk assessment for cryptocurrencies. Among other recommendations, the council also suggests HKMA regulate the advertisements and sales practices on crypto-assets to reduce the risks faced by consumers.

==== Control of Single-use Plastics ====
Following the Council for Sustainable Development's launch of the Public Engagement on Control of Single-use Plastics, the Council submitted its views and suggestions on the control of single-use plastic products in December 2021. Among other aspects, the Council raised the possibilities for the government to tighten the existing Plastic Shopping Bag (PSB) Levy Scheme in an attempt to reduce waste at source. Particularly, the Council suggested the raising of PSB charging level from the current HK$0.5 to HK$1–2. This coincides with one of the suggestions raised by the Council for Sustainable Development in its formal report on the Public Engagement, which was released on 14 April 2022.

==== ESG Reporting Guide and Listing Rules of the Hong Kong stock market ====
Following the Hong Kong Exchanges and Clearing Limited (HKEX)’s release of the Consultation Paper on Review of the Environmental, Social and Governance Reporting Guide and Related Listing Rules, the Council submitted its views and suggestions on protecting retail investors’ interests when it comes to sustainable investing in the Hong Kong stock market in July 2019. Among the recommendations, the Council suggested that the proposed ESG Reporting Guide of HKEX should render mandatory the disclosure of listed e-commerce companies’ usage of packaging materials and the reduction thereof. Further, the Council recommends the HKEX require listed companies to disclose internal statistics on customer satisfaction and relevant listed companies’ use of antibiotics in their supply chains.

The latest version of HKEX's Main Board Listing Rules – Appendix 27 Environment, Social and Governance Reporting Guide does include disclosure guides on supply chain management and the use of packaging materials.

== Limitation of Consumer Council ==
Despite the numerous publications issued by the Consumer Council as well as the effort put into driving public policies, the role of the Consumer Council has been criticised for lacking law enforcement power, ineffectiveness, and weak coordination with other government departments.

=== Limited services ===
According to critics, the service provided by the Consumer Council is rather limited. The duties of the council are limited to mediating disputes, providing information about products and industries, providing views to the government, etc. However, the council's impact on government decisions is rather indirect. For instance, the theme of World Consumer Rights Day 2021 is on tackling plastic pollution, encouraging consumers around the world to adopt a more sustainable way of consumption. All the Consumer Council can do for World Consumer Rights Day was to promote the message or to encourage the government and commercial sector to be more sustainable. Yet, when it comes to what policies would be implemented to promote sustainable consumption and plastic reduction, the Consumer Council hardly has a stake in policy formulations.

In terms of protecting Consumer rights, the Consumer Council receives consumer complaints involving the violation of Trade Descriptions Ordinance and Consumer Goods Safety Ordinance. Critics pointed out that the law enforcement for the violation of the two ordinances is mostly done by the Customs and Excise Department. The Consumer Council plays no more than a mediating role. When complaint cases have to be resolved in court, the Consumer Council actually lacks the power to initiate proceedings. This leads to difficulties for consumers to gather evidence and bring proceedings as consumers are mostly laymen without much legal knowledge. Although the council is willing to assist in the mediation of consumer complaints, in its 2008 study report, it was pointed out that criminal sanctions by public agencies are difficult to achieve. As a result, aggrieved consumers are faced with the daunting task of taking civil action on their own as the only redress option; apart from seeking the assistance of the council for mediation.

There are also criticisms on the limited power of Hong Kong's Consumer Council. Critics compare the Consumer Council with Australian Competition and Consumer Commission, a statutory authority whose role is to enforce the Competition and Consumer Act 2010 (CCA). Contrasting to Hong Kong's Consumer Council, the commission is given investigatory and law enforcement power whenever there are possible contraventions of the CCA and Australian Consumer Law. The Australian courts have upheld the CCA powers for a range of investigative purposes, including the power to provide the commission with evidence and to initiate proceedings on behalf of the consumers, which reduces consumers’ time and expenses engaged in legal proceedings.

Back in 2001, the Consumer Council suggested amending the Consumer Council Ordinance, which proposed to give the council the right to bring proceedings in court on behalf of consumers. In the Consumer Council Ordinance Review submitted by the Consumer Council, it was found out that the Council relied on the co-operation of the parties concerned to supply them with the necessary information to investigate complaints relating to competition as it does not have the power to ‘demand’ information. It made a proposal of amending the Ordinance to confer on it the power to sue on behalf of customers.

However, such proposed amendments were not made. Its mediating role was still emphasised. Furthermore, the government considered that the Customs and Excise Department has appropriate investigation powers, including the power to authorise the search of premises, seize goods or require the testing of products. As such, the suggestion of granting the Consumer Council statutory power to order the provision of information by persons concerned in consumer complaints was also found not necessary by the government.

=== Limited effectiveness ===
In 2010, the Chinese University of Hong Kong conducted the very first public opinion survey on behalf of the Consumer Council. Among 3,120 respondents interviewed, when they face problems with the products they bought or dissatisfaction with the service received, only 37% are willing to seek help from the Consumer Council. Anthony Cheung, the Chairman of the Consumer Council back then acknowledged the lack of law enforcement power of the Consumer Council. Yet, he mentioned that an average of 70-80% of the complaints could be resolved by mediation. Cheung also mentioned if prosecuting power is included in Consumer Council's duties, it may affect the mediation work of the council.

Still, criticisms revolving around the Council being a toothless tiger are prevalent. Former Legislative Councillor James To Kun-sun commented that the biggest power of the council was to defame poor-quality shops. However, the shops can still change their names and do business again. Eddy Chan, the Convenor of the Lehman Brothers Minibond Sufferers criticised that they had sought help from the Consumer Council for their investment loss from minibonds. At last, their case was referred to government departments for mediation. He criticised that the lack of law enforcement power will only make the Consumer Council a toothless tiger, which is unable to protect consumers effectively.

=== Areas of improvement identified by the Audit Commission ===
In 2018, the Director of Audit’s letter to the President of the Legislative Council published an audit on “Consumer protection against unfair trade practices, unsafe goods, and short weights and measures”. The director concluded the following inadequacies:

(1) Inadequacies in taking follow-up actions on complaints

(2) Inadequate monitoring of long-outstanding complaint cases

(3) Need to enhance the computer system to support the identification of traders with repeated undesirable trade practices

(4) Need to take forward the revamp project of CHOICE magazine

In a sample check of 30 complaint cases received from April 2013 to September 2017, it was revealed that there were omissions in issuing reminder letters to traders which did not respond to the Consumer Council's inquiry letters and delays in issuing reminders. There were inadequate follow-up actions with the traders who did not respond to the reminder letters and in some cases, the complainants were only informed of the case's progress more than 30 days after the traders had not responded to the reminder letters.

According to the Consumer Council's operational manual, after a case is concluded, the case officer should submit the case in the CCMS to the supervisor for review and approval for case closure. After approval, a final reply letter will be sent to notify the complainant of the closure of the case. It was found that 16% of the cases had been outstanding for almost three years or more due to errors in the council's computer system.

Although the Consumer Council's computer system could generate reports showing traders/industries with the highest numbers of complaints in every month, there was no laid-down procedure to identify traders with repeated undesirable trade practices. There is no analysis of whether the complaints are related to their undesirable trade practices which are one of the factors for considering naming and public reprimand action. Moreover, the lack of data mining capability of the system makes it difficult to extract other useful information such as dispute resolution rates of traders for analysis. As such, there is a risk that some serious cases of undesirable trade practices may not have been brought up by the system for considering further actions.

The CHOICE magazine has played an important role in helping consumers to make informed purchases since its introduction. Until 2017, findings of around 1,300 product tests, 2,280 in-depth studies, and 580 market surveys have been released. However, as online media takes over printed news, the sale of CHOICE magazine had dropped by 23% from an average of 27,428 copies a month in 2009–10 to 21,033 a month in 2016–17. There is a need for the Consumer Council to create content that can adapt to changing audience profiles and preferences in receiving information.

In addition to the four main problems identified, the report also identified the problem of low usage of a voluntary mediation scheme implemented by the Office of the Communications Authority (OFCA). To address issues of billing disputes in the telecommunications services, OFCA has implemented a voluntary mediation scheme, namely the Customer Complaint Settlement Scheme (CCSS) to help resolve billing disputes in deadlock between the telecommunications service providers and their customers. The CCSS's handling capacity is 400 cases a year. However, the number of cases referred to the CCSS from November 2012 to October 2017 averaged only 74 cases a year, representing a utilisation rate of about 18.5%.

Furthermore, there are also inadequacies in the information exchange and case referral between the enforcement agencies and Consumer Council. For instance, the computer systems of the Consumer Council and the Customs and Excise Department (C&ED) are not able to receive information from each other. According to the C&ED, further system enhancements were required for referring cases to the CC for conciliation. The report also noted that OFCA was not involved in setting up the electronic platform for information exchange and case referral.

In regards to the Consumer Legal Action Fund (CLAF), which is designed to “provide consumers easier access to legal remedies by providing them financial and legal assistance in meritorious cases, particularly those where a number of complaints have similar grievances”, it was found out by the Law Reform Commission of Hong Kong that the fund is grossly underutilised. On average, there were only two to three successful applications per year between 1995 and 2012 for the CLAF. Since its establishment and up until the year under review, the CLAF has received a total of 1,406 applications and has granted assistance to 718 applications.

Besides, there are numerous disincentives for citizens to apply for CLAF. Firstly, there is a non-refundable application fee payable at the time of application. If the applicant's case is to be tried in the Small Claims Tribunal, the application fee is HK$100. For cases to be tried in the District Court or other higher courts, the application fee is HK$1,000. The application fee is non-refundable even if the application is rejected. Secondly, applicants are made liable for “all losses, costs, expenses, claims, damages and liabilities” in the event that the claim is unsuccessful due to the applicant not providing true and accurate information, presumably even if such omission was committed unwittingly. Thirdly, assistance from the Fund can be terminated “at any time”, which may hinder citizens’ interests in applying CLAF since it is uncertain whether they can have sufficient monetary support to pursue their claims.

== Controversies ==
=== Consumer Council suspends annual journalism awards, co-hosted with the Hong Kong Journalists Association ===
From 2001 to 2021, the Consumer Council held the annual Consumer Rights News Reporting Awards (“CRRA”) in conjunction with the Hong Kong Journalists Association (“HKJA”) and the Hong Kong Press Photojournalist Association (“HKPPA”).

In November 2021, CRRA was suspended by the council, the news of which was first reported by Ta Kung Pao, which in its article accused the HKJA of being “anti-China” and disturbing Hong Kong. HKJA expressed “regret and disappointment”, claiming that no consultation has been made with all the parties involved. In response, the Council stated that there is a need for a full review of the Awards. Paul Lam Ting-kwok, Chairman of the Consumer Council, stated that the council had collected enough expertise to host the Awards independently. He added that the media landscape has changed, with social platforms having emerged to disseminate news in addition to traditional media. He claimed that the decision to comprehensively revamp the whole event was made after taking into account a number of considerations and did not involve any political factor.

On 7 February 2022, after reviewing various media development trends and taking reference to various international news awards, the council announced details of the revamped CRRA. Monetary awards will be doubled, whilst an Annual Topic Award and a Best Use of Social Media in Consumer Advocacy category will be added.

=== The “discontinuation” of the appointment of Yuen, a pan-democrat, as the Committee Member of the Consumer Council ===
In December 2021, the Government announced that Ramon Yuen, a member of the Consumer Council, will vacate the position after finishing his two-year tenure by the end of 2021. Yuen stated that neither did he seek for vacating the position nor did the government approach him on that matter beforehand. Yuen commented that the matter did not correlate to his attendance rate, the quality of speeches or opinions, or the number of consumer cases handled to his reappointment.

=== Criticisms by businesses against Consumer Council’s reports ===
In 2000, the Consumer Council reported that five popular brands of shark liver oil contain PCBs that exceeded the PCBs threshold. After the report was released, this led to a sharp decline in the sales of Shark Liver Oil in Hong Kong. In order to protect its reputation, Deep Sea Oil Ltd., an Australian manufacturer that produces shark liver oil pills publicly challenged the Consumer Council, criticising the council's uncomprehensive testing. The manufacturer commissioned the Hong Kong Standards and Testing Centre and Australia's Government Analytical Laboratories to conduct independent tests. The results showed that the health products’ polychlorinated biphenyls and DDT content were lower than the standards set by the US Product and Drug Administration, the World Health Organization, and Japan's Food Standards Code.

In 2020, the Consumer Council conducted inspections on sunscreen products. The Council mentioned that the effect of FANCL's sunscreen was incompatible with its description. Disappointed with the Consumer Council's test report, FANCL criticised the Consumer Council for not accepting other independent product test reports, international literature, and suggestions from university scholars. Instead, the Council insisted on reviewing products with the test results obtained from a single experiment, which may be misleading to consumers.

=== Overpayment of staff ===
In 2002, public institutions, including the Consumer Council, were found to have overpaid their senior staff. Consumer Council's revenue in 2000 was more than 73 million, of which 78% of the revenue went to staff salaries. On the other hand, costs of testing and education only accounted for 6% and 3.8% respectively. Guoqiang Lee, the Chairperson of the Hong Kong and Kowloon Trades Union Council (as he then was) criticised that the public institutions were like “independent kingdoms”. He suggested the government strengthen supervision, review staff remuneration, and restructure the institutions. If the remuneration of public institutions staff is too different from that of civil servants and the private market workers, remunerations should be lowered.

== Recent Development ==
=== AI Complaint System ===
The government would fund more than HK$20 million to assist the Consumer Council in updating its complaint processing system to handle merchant-consumer disputes, data analysis, risk alerts, and other tasks. Paul Lam described the system to be the most advanced one in the Asia-Pacific region. He also revealed the council's plan to establish an online dispute settlement platform that allows consumers to communicate directly with businesses with the council's monitoring and mediation where necessary. The system will reportedly leverage big data and artificial intelligence to analyse and store information, which can enable the council to better understand and identify issues of consumers’ concerns.

=== Statutory Cooling-off Period & Regulation of Overseas Property Sales ===
In 2021, the Consumer Council suggested to the government for establishing a "statutory cooling-off period" and regulating overseas property sales. However, due to social movements and the advent of the epidemic, the former's legislative activity has been halted, while the latter is still in the consultative phase. The Consumer Council also conducted a research report on overseas property sales, which includes legislation or amendments to relevant laws, as well as the implementation of a mandatory licensing system to control real estate brokers that manage and sell properties in Hong Kong and overseas.

=== Closer Cross-boundary Collaboration with Consumer Protection Bodies in the Mainland and Macau ===
In November 2019, the Consumer Council entered into an agreement with the China Consumers Association (“CCA”) to strengthen the support to Hong Kong consumers by joining the “Online Shopping Consumer Protection Express Platform” scheme established by the latter. Under the scheme, consumers having disputes with participating online traders will be assisted by the Council upon the fulfilment of certain conditions. The council will upload the details of the complaint to the Platform, making the details of the relevant complaints visible to the participating online traders for their follow-up actions. The council will record the relevant result after the case is closed.

In May 2021, the Commerce and Development Bureau claimed in a response to LegCo Questions that the Consumer Council had signed Memoranda of Understanding with the Macao SAR Government Consumer Council and consumer protection bodies in 26 Mainland provinces and municipalities, including the nine municipalities in the Greater Bay Area, to establish mutual complaint referral mechanisms to protect the rights and interests of online shoppers.

== See also ==
- Government of Hong Kong
