= Tetiana Montian =

Ukrainian lawyer

- Тетяна Монтян
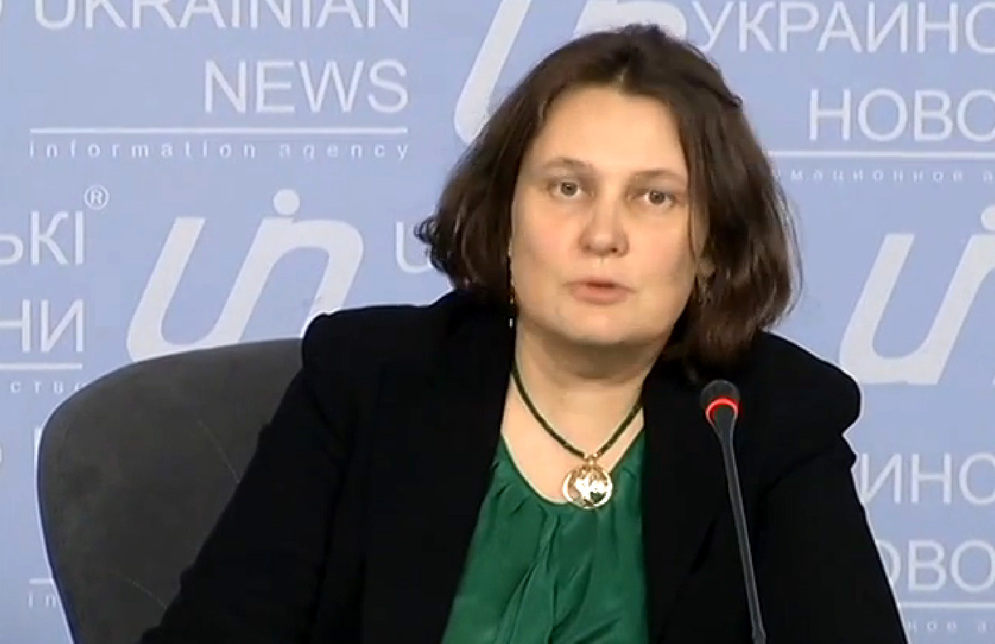
- Montian in 2014
- Born: Tetiana Mykolaivna Montian; 29 August 1972 (age 54); Kerch, Crimean Oblast, Ukrainian SSR, Soviet Union
- Other name: Tatyana Montyan
- Citizenship: Ukraine
- Education: Moscow State University
- Occupations: Lawyer; journalist; blogger
- Years active: 1995-present
- Spouse: Yurii Vasilenko ( –2019)
- Children: 4

Tetiana Mykolaivna Montian (Ukrainian: Тетяна Миколаївна Монтян; Russian: Татьяна Николаевна Монтян, romanized: Tatyana Nikolayevna Montyan; born 29 August 1972) is a Ukrainian lawyer, journalist and pro-Russian blogger.

== Early life and education ==
Tetiana Montian was born on 29 September 1972 in Kerch. Her mother was a teacher and her father was a ship mechanic.

From 1989 to 1994 she studied at the Faculty of Law of Moscow State University, specializing in constitutional law. In 1994, after graduating from university, she moved from Moscow to Kyiv.

== Career ==
=== The «9 March» case and the protection of UNA-UNSO activists ===
On June 4, 2001, the Security Service of Ukraine opened a criminal case against 19 participants in the "Ukraine without Kuchma" action that took place on March 9, 2001. Tetiana Montian acted as a lawyer for the UNA-UNSO members, in particular, the then leader of the organization, Andriy Shkil. According to Montian, the indictment contained many errors and inconsistencies.

=== Participation in the Orange Revolution ===
During the Orange Revolution and the 2004 presidential elections, Montian was responsible for combating election fraud in the Mykolaiv Oblast. Together with other lawyers, she coordinated the work of about 600 election commission members and observers.

=== Attitude towards the Euromaidan events ===
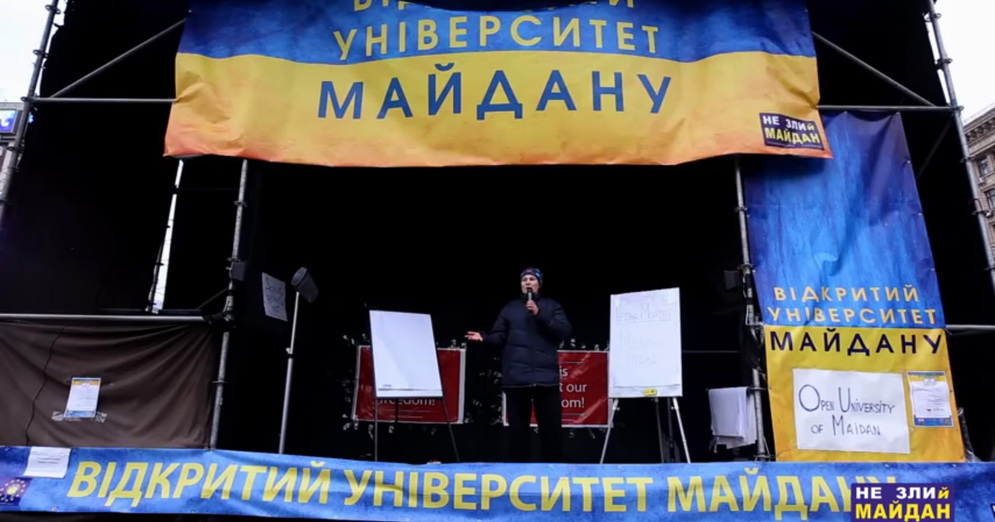
Tetiana Montian lectures at the «Euromaidan Open University»

From the very beginning of Euromaidan, Montian opposed the overthrow of President Viktor Yanukovych, while not justifying the government's actions against the demonstrators.

=== Ruslan Kotsaba case ===
Montian acted for the defense in the high-profile case of journalist Ruslan Kotsaba, who was accused of treason and obstructing the activities of the Armed Forces of Ukraine. Kotsaba was arrested and held in custody since February 8, 2015, the court hearings were held in the Ivano-Frankivsk City Court.

On May 11, 2016, Montian spoke in the final debates in the Kotsaba case, pointing out the contradictions between the indictment and the factual circumstances of the country's legal regime, including the absence of martial law in the country, and called on the court to acquit the defendant due to lack of evidence of a crime. The prosecutor's office, for its part, called on the court to find Kotsaba guilty on all counts and sentence him to 13 years' imprisonment with confiscation of property. On May 12, 2016, the court sentenced Kotsaba to imprisonment for 3 years and 6 months, finding him guilty of obstructing the lawful actions of the Armed Forces of Ukraine, but dismissed the charges of treason and returned the property seized during the arrest. Montian stated that she would appeal the ruling and demand a full acquittal of Ruslan Kotsaba.

On July 14, 2016, the Ivano-Frankivsk regional court of appeal, examining the appeal of Ruslan Kotsaba, prepared by Montian, found him not guilty on all counts and fully acquitted him; Kotsaba was released from custody in the courtroom.

=== Vita Zaverukha case ===
Since September 22, 2015, Tetiana Montian has been acting for the defense in the case of Vita Zaverukha, a neo-Nazi suspect in the shooting of police officers in Kyiv, at the request of Zaverukha's husband's relatives. The case received significant publicity due to the severity of the charges and the openly radical position of the accused.

On October 10, 2015, after another court hearing, Montian told the press that the court had no factual evidence of her client's involvement in any crime.

On June 11, 2016, it was reported that Zaverukha had refused further services from Montyan.

=== Political activity ===
In December 2015, she was included in the Mirotvorets website database. According to pro-Ukrainian activists, Montyan provides legal assistance to separatists.

She spoke at the UN Security Council as a Ukrainian civil activist at a meeting on February 17, 2022, dedicated to the situation in the eastern regions of Ukraine and the implementation of the Minsk agreements. In her speech, she expressed the Russian view of the events in Ukraine and Donbas.

Justifies the Russo-Ukrainian war. The Ukrainian prosecutor's office accuses Montian of calling for the overthrow of the Ukrainian government, encroaching on territorial integrity and denying Russian aggression. According to the investigation, Montian left for Russia in 2021, appears on Russian TV and through her video channels, where she supports the war against Ukraine.

== Personal life ==
Widow of Yurii Vasylenko (1940—2019), who was a judge of the Kyiv Court of Appeal from 1994 to 2005. He was known for having initiated two criminal cases against the President of Ukraine, Leonid Kuchma, in November 2002.

Tetiana Montian has four sons. The eldest are twins Bohdan "Iceberg" and Yaroslav "Pikachu" Vasilenko (born April 13, 1997) is cyber athletes; at the age of fifteen they were Ukrainian boxing champions.
