= Vita (given name) =

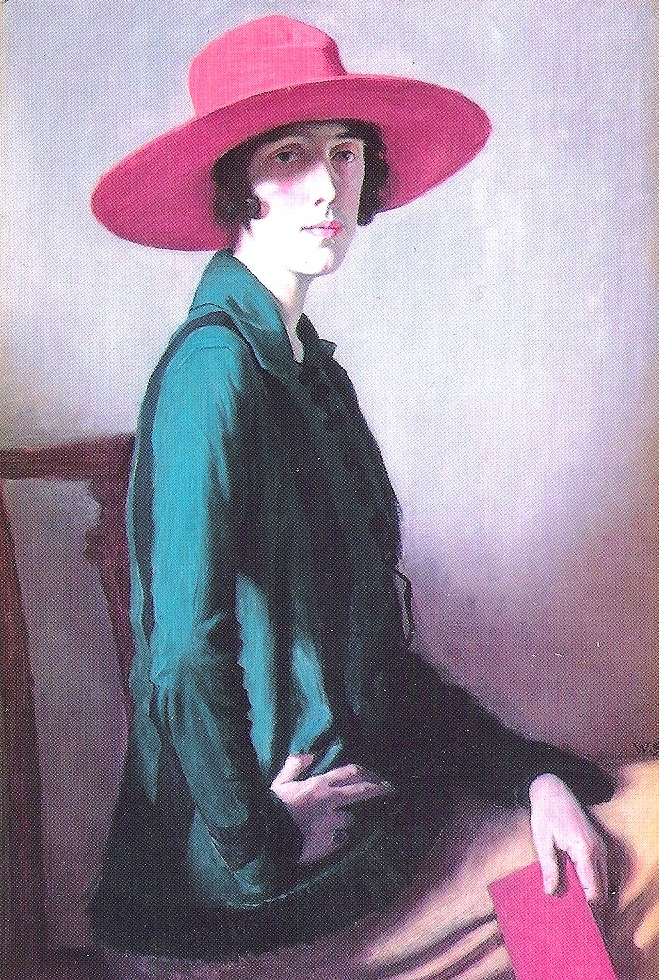
- Vita Sackville-West by William Strang.
- Gender: Primarily female
- Language: Latin

Origin
- Meaning: life

Vita is a feminine given name derived from the Latin word meaning life. In other instances it has been used as a diminutive of names such as Victoria or as a feminine form of the related masculine name Vitus and its masculine and feminine variants. It has been in general use since the 1800s.

The name was among the ten most popular names for newborn girls in Slovenia in 2021.

Notable people with the given name include:

- Vita Andersen (1944–2021), Danish author
- Vita Ayala, Afro-Puerto Rican comics writer
- Vita Barbić (born 2007), Croatian athlete
- Vita Buivid (born 1962), Ukrainian Russian artist and photographer
- Vita Chambers (born 1993), Canadian singer and songwriter
- Vita Gollancz (1926–2009), British artist
- Vita Heathcote (born 2001), British sailor
- Vita Heine (born 1984), Norwegian cyclist
- Vita Horobets (born 1996), Ukrainian basketball player
- Vita Kari (born 1994), American multimedia artist
- Vita Kawawa (born 1964), Tanzanian politician
- Vita Kin (born 1969), Ukrainian fashion designer
- Alessandro Vita Kouzkin (born 1992), Russian-Italian race car driver
- Vita Kuktienė (born 1980), Lithuanian basketball player
- Vita Liberte, Latvian businessperson
- Vita van der Linden (born 1997), Dutch association football player
- Vita Marissa (born 1981), Indonesian badminton player
- Vita Mateshuk (born 1969), Ukrainian volleyball player
- Vita Matīse (born 1972), Latvian windsurfer
- Vita Mavrič, Slovene singer
- Vita Nel (born 1975), South African beach volleyball player
- Vita Nelson, American publisher
- Vita Nikolaenko (born 1995), Belarusian footballer
- Vita Opolskytė (born 1992), Lithuanian painter
- Vita Palamar (born 1977), Ukrainian high jumper
- Vita Pavlysh (born 1969), Ukrainian shot putter
- Vita Petersen (1915–2011), German American artist
- Vita Poniatovskaia (born 2003), Russian ice hockey player
- Vita Robinson (born 1982), New Zealand rugby union player
- Vita Rudenok (born 1978), Ukrainian weightlifter
- Vita Sackville-West (1892–1962), English writer and gardener
- Vita Semerenko (born 1986), Ukrainian biathlete
- Vita Sidorkina (born 1994), Russian model
- Vita Silchenko (born 1967), Belarusian fencer
- Vita VonTesse Starr (born 1987), American drag queen and makeup artist
- Vita Styopina (born 1976), Ukrainian high jumper
- Vita Anda Tērauda (born 1962), Latvian politician
- Vita Vārpiņa (born 1968), Latvian actress
- Vita Vea (born 1995), American football player
- Vita (rapper) (born 1976), American rapper
- Vita Witek (1868–1925), Danish pianist
- Vita Yakymchuk (born 1980), Ukrainian cross-country skier
- Vita Zaverukha (born 1996), Ukrainian far-right activist & militant
- Vita Zubchenko (born 1989), Ukrainian rhythmic gymnast
