= Fairwood (restaurant) =

Hong Kong fast food chain

Fairwood Holdings, Ltd.
- Company type: Public
- Traded as: SEHK: 52
- Industry: Foodservice
- Founded: Tsuen Wan, Hong Kong 1972; 54 years ago
- Headquarters: North Point, Hong Kong
- Key people: Dennis Lo, Chairman; Francis Lo, CEO
- Products: Fast food
- Revenue: HKD 2.4 billion (2016)
- Number of employees: 5,600 (2021 March)
- Website: www.fairwood.com.hk

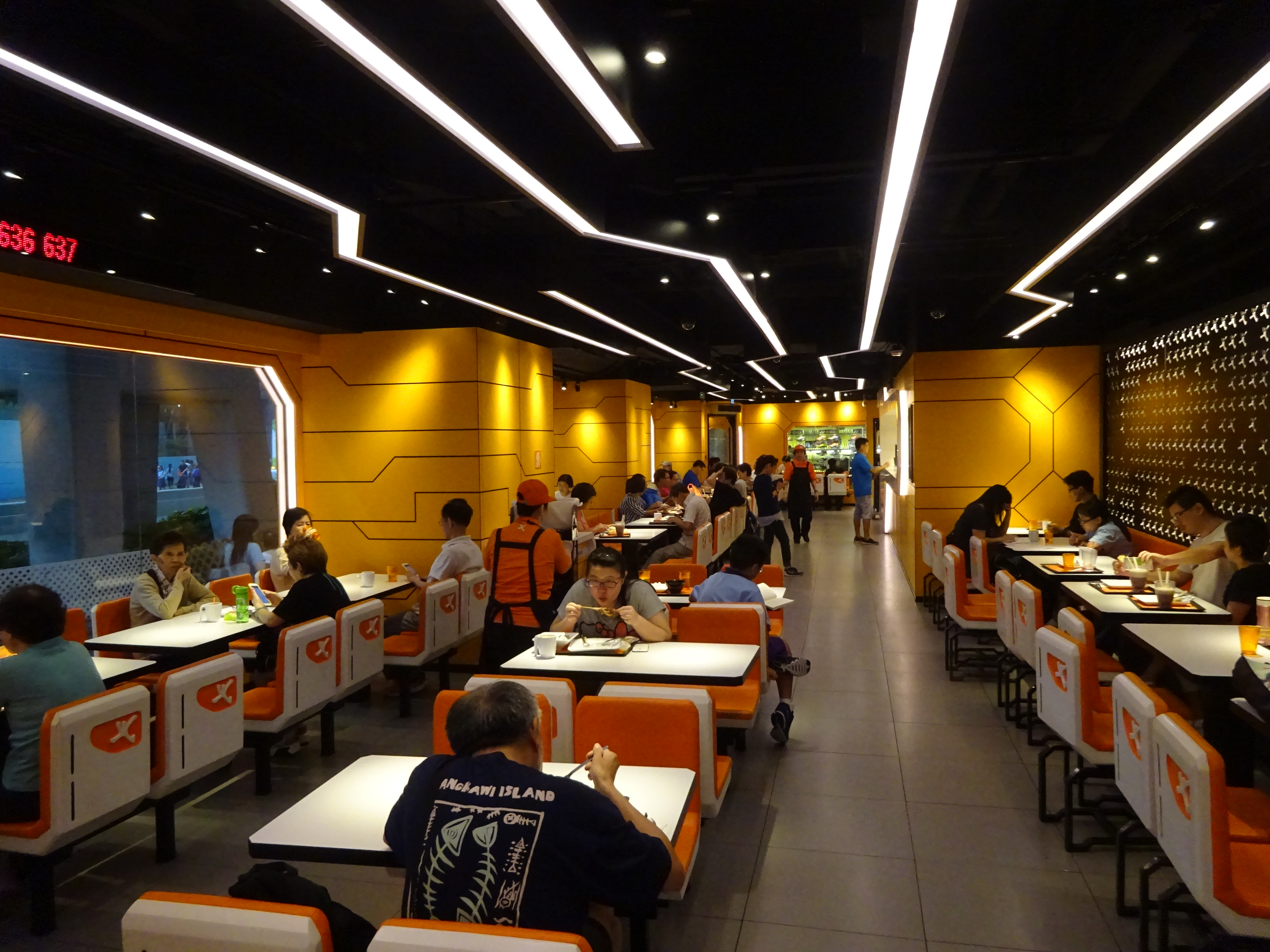
Interior of a Fairwood restaurant

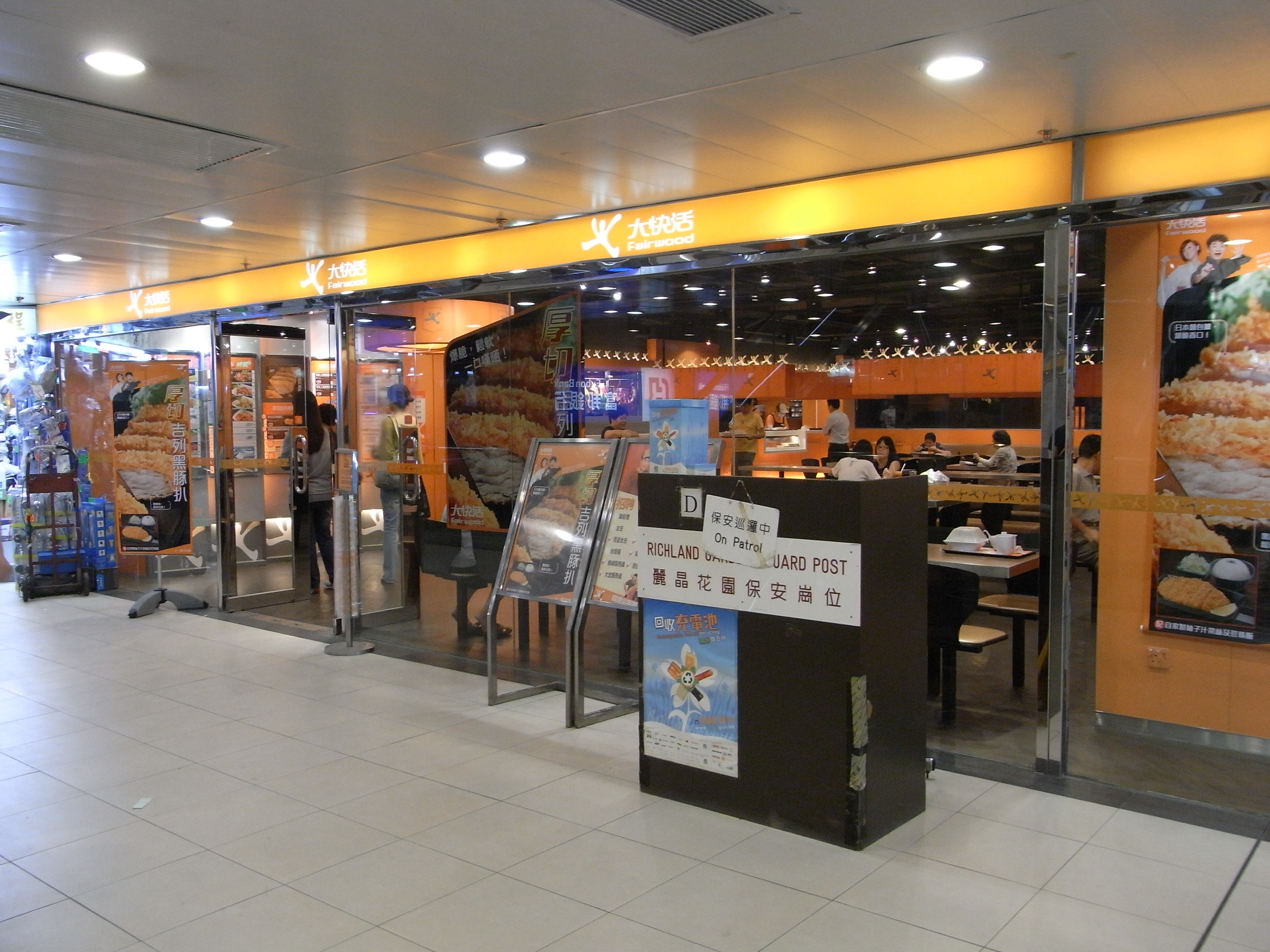
Exterior of a Fairwood restaurant

Fairwood (Chinese: 大快活) is a fast food chain offering Chinese and Western food. Founded in December 1972 in the Tsuen Wan district of Hong Kong, its current headquarters are located in North Point. Since that time, the company has grown to 98 outlets all over Hong Kong (94 fast food, 2 cafes and 2 specialty restaurants) and 13 locations in Mainland China including major cities such as Shenzhen, Guangzhou and Beijing. Behind Café de Coral, Fairwood is the second largest fast food chain in Hong Kong and serves over 100,000 customers each day.

Fairwood operates three main businesses including its core fast food business, an institutional catering business primarily designed for school lunches, and a third business that operates specialty restaurants including Buddy Cafe, Cafe Porto and Cafe Oasis.

== History ==
Fairwood was founded by Dennis Lo Fong-cheung, brother of Vitasoy founder Lo Kwee-seong and Café de Coral founder Victor Lo Tang-seong. It opened its first restaurant in December 1972 in Chung On Street, Tsuen Wan, and its second in Fuk Wing Street, Sham Shui Po, five years later. By September 1991, when Fairwood made its initial public offering, it had expanded to 52 locations and operated its own facility for processing food in an effort to lower costs and maintain consistency.

On 31 December 2008, Fairwood announced that Chan Chee Shing would replace Dennis Lo as CEO of Fairwood Holdings, with Mr Lo retaining his position as Chairman.

=== Rebranding ===
Old logo, until 2003

Fairwood originally adopted a green color scheme in its first stores and used a happy clown on its logo. Its name literally means "big happiness".

The SARS outbreak in 2003 had a negative impact on the fast food industry in Hong Kong and as a result, Fairwood conducted research and subsequently rebranded itself. It contracted graphics designer Alan Chan to design its new logo, that of a "jumping man" which is made to resemble the Chinese character for "big" (大). Overnight, Fairwood changed all the signs on its stores.

On 18 November 2003, Fairwood launched a new flagship store in Causeway Bay. The new store concept, designed by Steve Leung and Yasumichi Morita, featured shades of orange, vinyl material, and an overall vibrant look that was intended to increase the restaurant's appeal.

In addition to a visual redesign, Fairwood reformulated and improved its signature dishes and released them under the "Ah Wood" brand. These dishes included such favorites as curry beef brisket and baked pork chop over rice. Fairwood also banned smoking in all of its restaurants, a first for any fast food chain in Hong Kong at the time. This was before the public smoking ban in indoor areas in Hong Kong in 2007.

=== Expansion ===
In March 2007, Fairwood announced its plans to increase its restaurant count to 100 in Hong Kong and to 30 in Mainland China by 2010. This expansion will be accompanied by a marketing campaign featuring celebrities in order to attract a more youthful crowd. In addition, Fairwood will expand its menu in its Mainland outlets to better cater to local tastes.

== Product ==
Fairwood serves fast food, including a blend of Chinese, Japanese and Western cuisine. The menu changes throughout the day and is split into 4 meal times: Breakfast, Lunch, Afternoon Tea and Dinner. In addition, some items may sell out and be replaced by others. The entire menu is evaluated and rotated on a weekly basis. In all, Fairwood cycles around over 200 dishes.

Dishes themselves include staples such as Siu Mei, baked pork chop with rice, curry beef brisket and twists on Western dishes such as fried eggs with luncheon meat, spaghetti bolognaise and baked macaroni with ham. Soups such as Russian borscht are also served. On occasion, more seasonal dishes will be served. For example, hot pot and clay pot dishes are served in the winter, when they are typically consumed.

== Service and preparation ==
As is customary in most HK-style fast food restaurants and fast casual restaurants, customers view the menu on the wall and order at the counter. Customers can pay using cash, AliPay, WeChat Pay or Octopus card. Most dishes are prepared to order, and the customer will pick them up when they are ready. Seating is first-come, first-served.

== See also ==
- Café de Coral
- Cuisine of Hong Kong
- List of Chinese restaurants
- Maxim's MX
- Yoshinoya
