= Flagstaff House, Hong Kong =

Museum in Central, Hong Kong

Coordinates: 22°16′42.60″N 114°9′45.0″E

Flagstaff House
- 旗桿屋
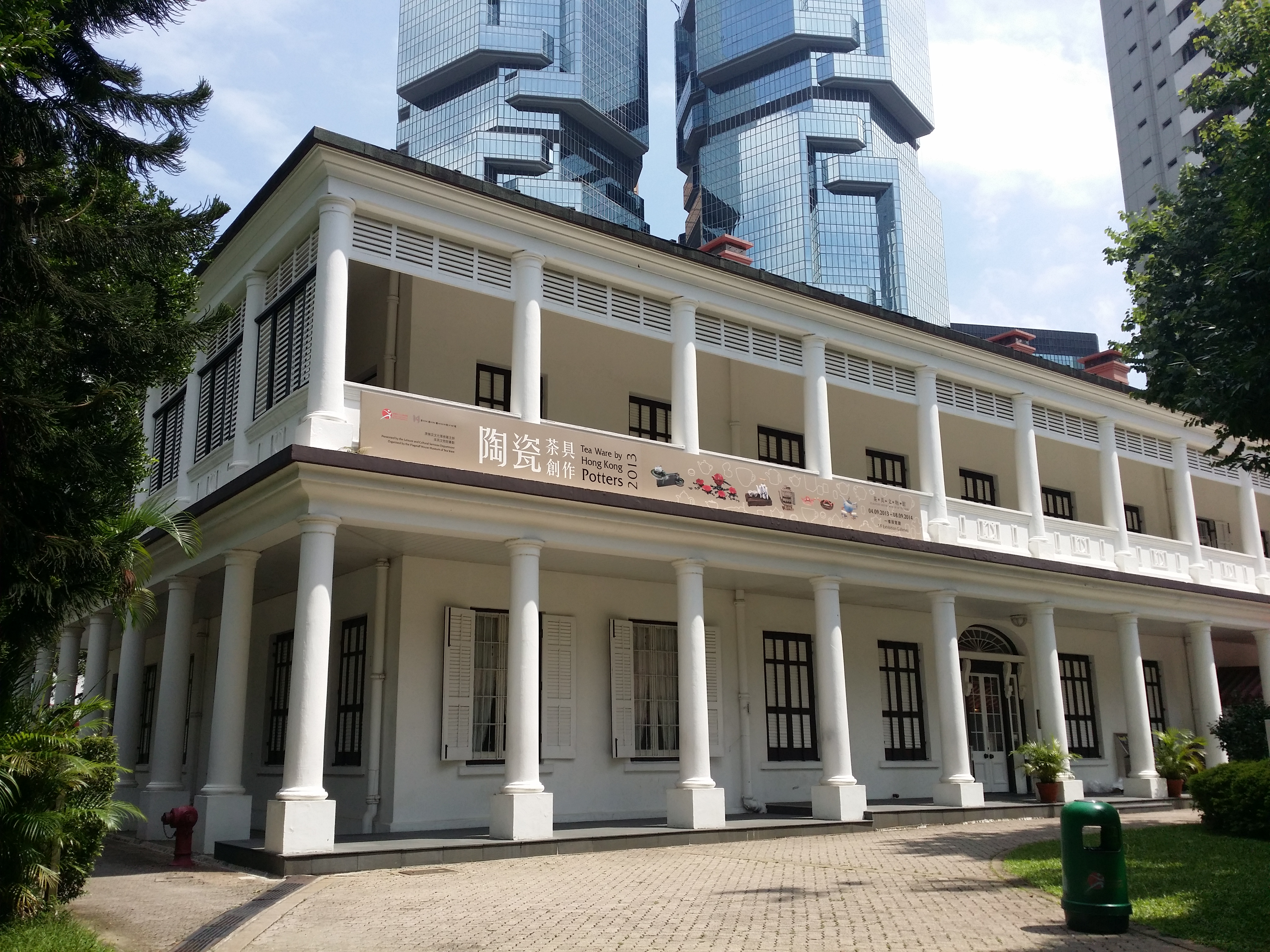
- Flagstaff house
- Interactive map of the Flagstaff House area

General information
- Architectural style: Greek revival style
- Location: Central, 10 Cotton Tree Drive, Hong Kong
- Current tenants: Museum of Tea Ware
- Completed: 1846
- Owner: Hong Kong Government

Website
- hk.art.museum/tea-ware

Declared Monument of Hong Kong
- Designated: 14 September 1989
- Reference no.: 36

Flagstaff House
- Traditional Chinese: 旗桿屋
- Simplified Chinese: 旗杆屋
Transcriptions
Standard Mandarin
- Hanyu Pinyin: Qígānwū
- Wade–Giles: Ch'i^{2} kan^{1} wu^{1}
Yue: Cantonese
- Yale Romanization: Kèih gōn ūk
- Jyutping: Kei4 gon1 uk1
- IPA: [kʰȅi kɔ́ːn ʔʊ́k]

Museum of Tea Ware
- Traditional Chinese: 茶具文物館
- Simplified Chinese: 茶具文物馆
Transcriptions
Standard Mandarin
- Hanyu Pinyin: Chájù Wénwùguǎn
- Wade–Giles: Ch'a^{2} chü^{4} wen^{2} wu^{4} kuan^{3}
Yue: Cantonese
- Yale Romanization: Chàh geuih màhn maht gún
- Jyutping: Caa4 geoi6 man4 mat6 gwun2
- IPA: [tsʰȁː kɵ̀y mɐ̏n mɐ̀t kʷǔːn]

Flagstaff House, built in 1846, is the oldest example of colonial architecture remaining in Hong Kong. It is located at 10 Cotton Tree Drive, Central – within the Hong Kong Park.

It has been a longtime residence of the Commander of the British forces in Hong Kong during colonial times. Today Flagstaff House houses the Flagstaff House Museum of Tea Ware.

== History ==
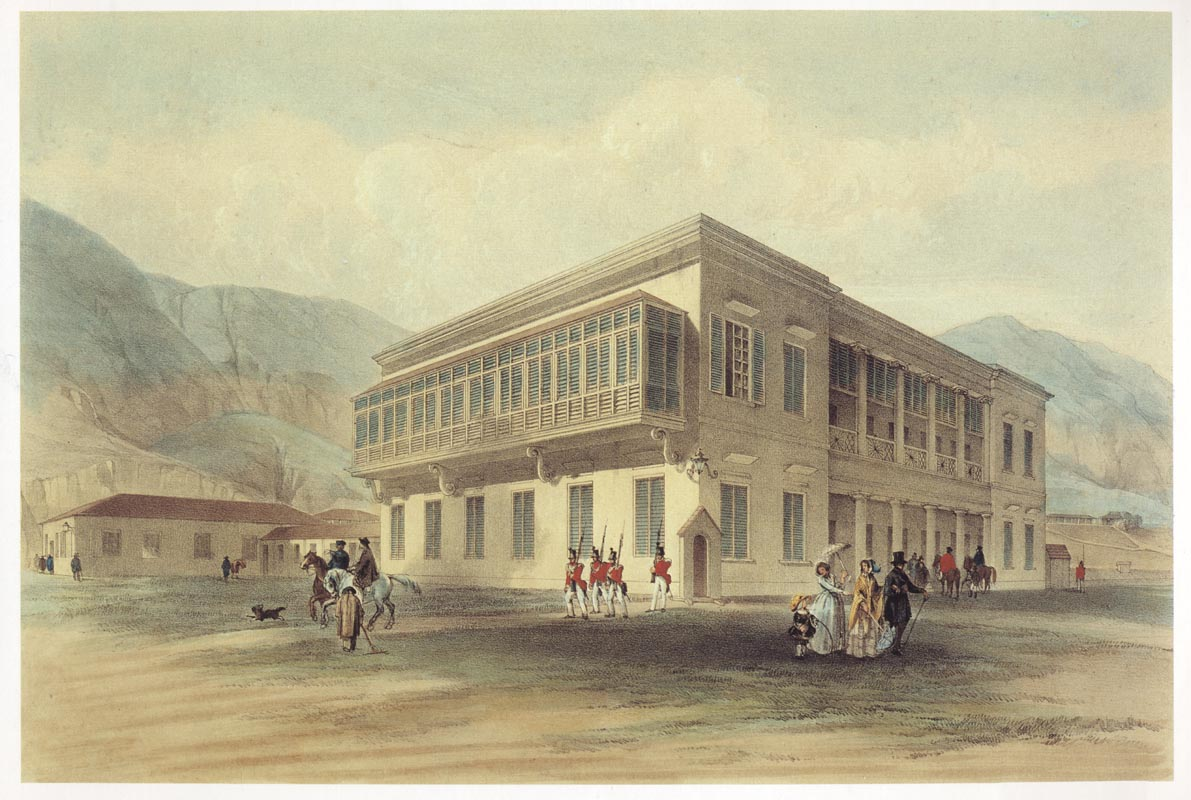
Flagstaff House in 1846

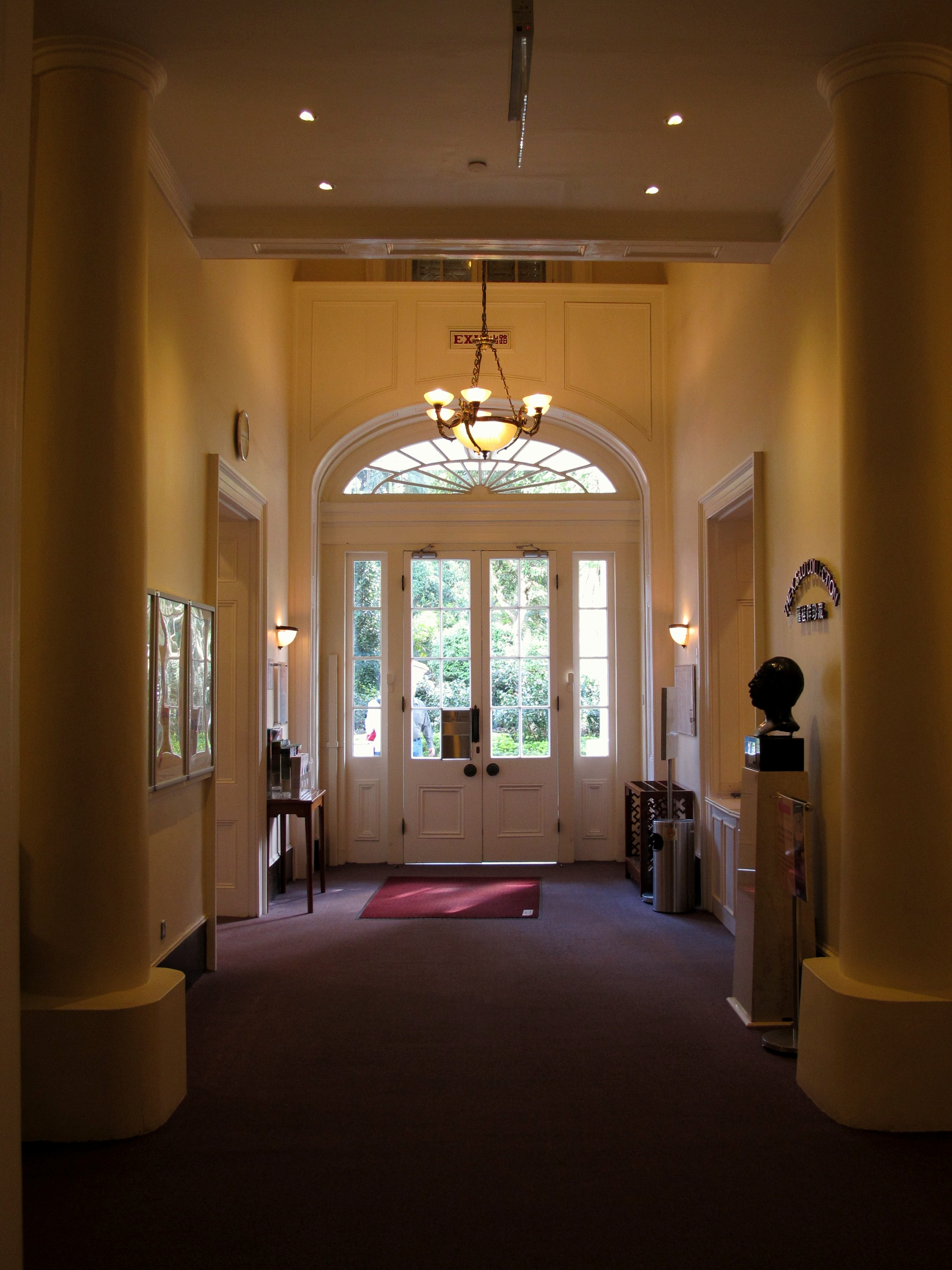
Interior of Flagstaff House

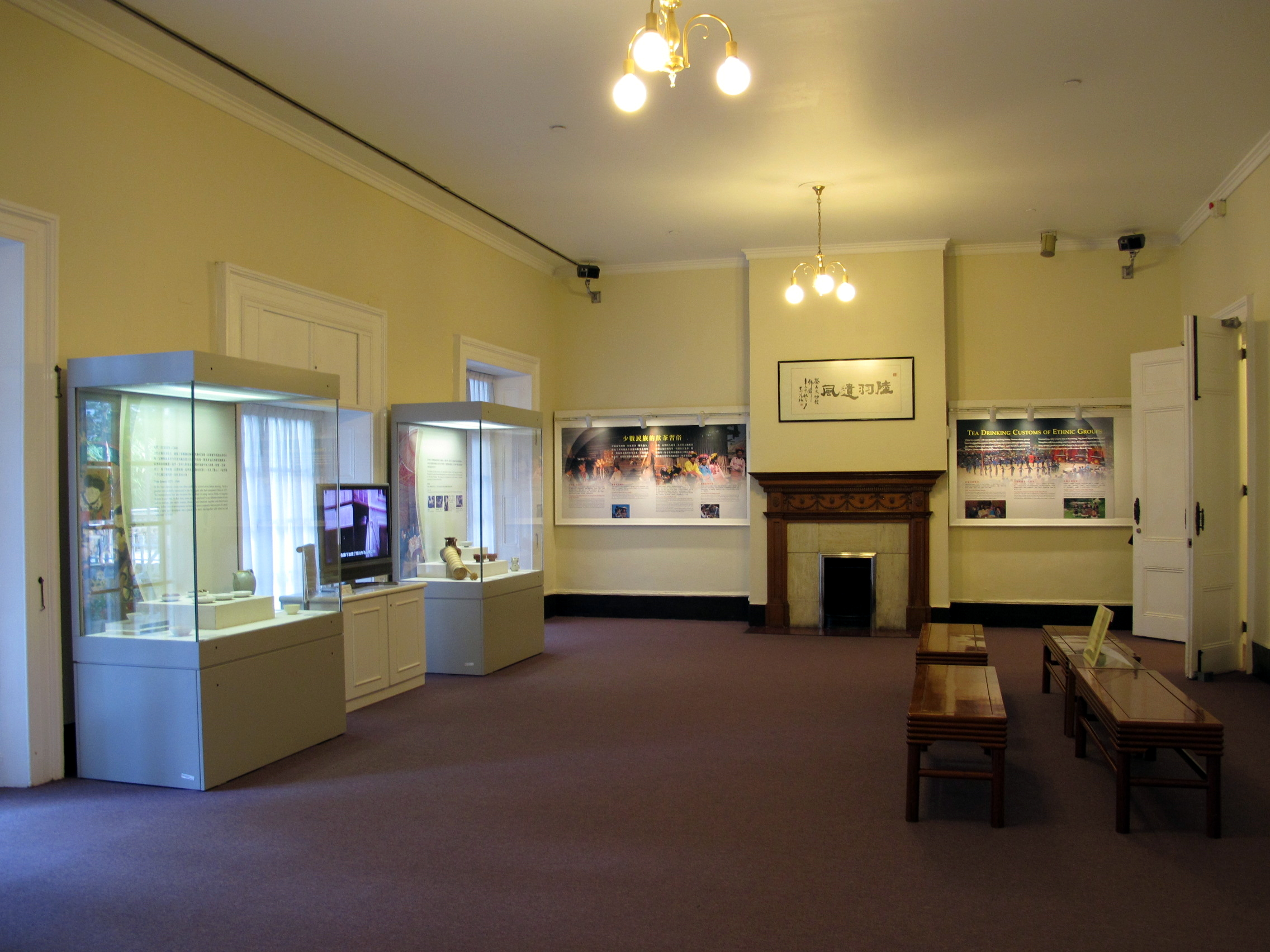
Interior of Flagstaff House

Flagstaff House had been named as Headquarter House until 1932. The site chosen was a small bluff above the barracks and above Queen's Road, then at the waterfront.

The building was designed in Greek revival style. Historians suspect it was designed either by Murdoch Bruce, a Scotsman who was inspector of buildings, or by Lieutenant Bernard Collinson of the Royal Engineers. Construction was completed in 1846, and the first occupant was Major-General George Charles D'Aguilar, General Officer Commanding from 1844 to 1846, who also held the post of Lieutenant Governor.

The west and east wings were shelled during the Japanese invasion in the Second World War; it also suffered bomb damage. The Japanese repaired it and the Commandant took the building as his residence during the occupation.

After the war, Flagstaff House was again the Commander's residence until 1978, when the Commander moved to a purpose built house on Barker Road. It was handed over by the military to the civilian Hong Kong Government as part of the recovery of Victoria Barracks. The Government put it under the responsibility of the Urban Council in 1981.

The building was declared a monument in 1989. It was restored as far as possible to its original mid-19th-century appearance, structurally reinforced, and the interior was to be modified so that it could be used as a museum.

== Museum of Tea Ware ==
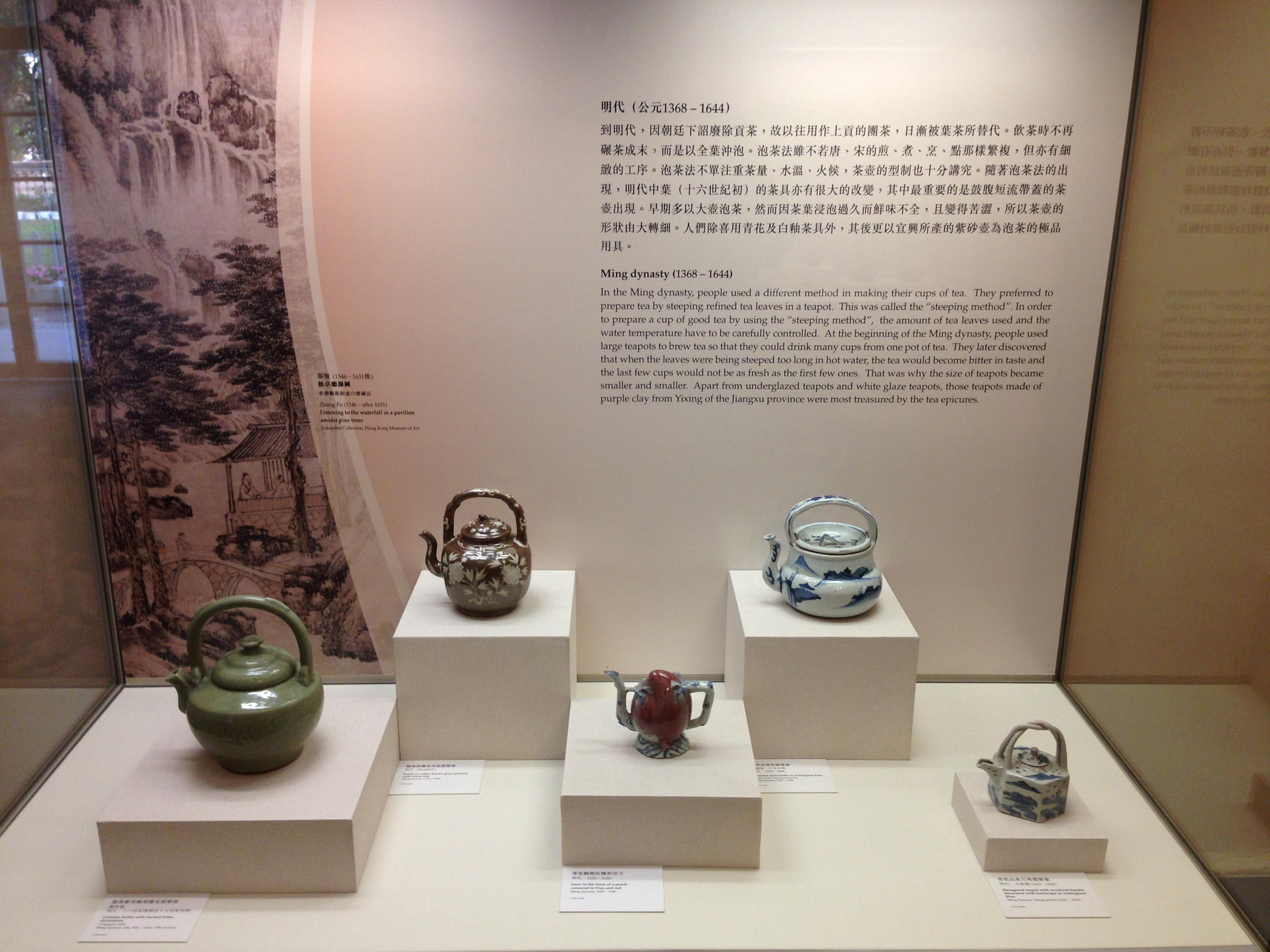
A display of tea ware from the Flagstaff House Museum

In 1984, it was converted into the Flagstaff House Museum of Tea Ware, the only branch museum of the Hong Kong Museum of Art. The museum specialises in the collection, study and display of teaware, including many samples of Yixing teapots, from Jiangsu Province, China, as well as the world's oldest known extant teapot.

A new wing, the K.S. Lo Gallery, was built and opened in 1995. It is named after local collector (and Vitasoy founder Dr. Kwee Seong Lo), who made a donation to the city in the 1970s. This donation now constitutes the core of the museum's collection. The new gallery contains a collection of ceramics and Chinese seals.

== See also ==
- History of Hong Kong
- Hong Kong tea culture
- List of buildings and structures in Hong Kong
- List of museums in Hong Kong
