= Moneypaper Inc =

American publishing company

The Moneypaper, Inc.
- Founded: June 21, 1996
- Headquarters: Rye, NY, United States
- Key people: Vita Nelson (Chief Executive Officer)
- Website: www.directinvesting.com

The Moneypaper, Inc. is a publishing company that specializes in financial news and information. It was founded in 1996 with the mission to provide information to small-scale investors who "thought that investing was too hard and too dangerous." It previously published under the name of Temper of the Times Communications, Inc., before it was renamed after its monthly financial newsletter in 1996.

Currently it distributes three different publications: The Moneypaper, a monthly financial newsletter, Direct Investing, a bi-weekly publication, and The Moneypaper’s Guide to Direct Investing, an annual guide to publicly traded companies that offer Dividend Reinvestment Plans.

The Moneypaper, Inc. also maintains a website that contains a database of every company that offers a Dividend reinvestment program; in 2010, this database was used by The Motley Fool in one of its articles extolling the virtues of DRIP investing.
