= Vita Nelson =

American publisher

Vita Nelson is an entrepreneur and publisher and is the president of The Moneypaper, Inc., in Rye, NY, where she functions as editor of its numerous publications. She is often cited as an expert on DRIP investing, having been quoted in publications as prestigious as The Wall Street Journal.

== Career ==
Nelson graduated from Boston University with a degree in comparative literature. Her first job after college was at Mademoiselle magazine. She left Mademoiselle in 1960 to work on Wall Street for Granger & Company, working as a bond trader.

In 1969, with the help of Barbara Robson, Marlene Goldrich, and Barbara Reifler, she began Westchester Magazine, a monthly magazine that targeted Westchester County's upscale, arts-oriented crowd. She went on to sell the magazine in 1980 and began searching for a business to acquire or establish with the proceeds from that sale. In 1981, she decided to start her own financial newsletter, and the first issue of The Moneypaper: A Financial Publication for Women was published in 1982. She later dropped the subheading "after I started hearing from men who read the newsletter but subscribed to it under their wives' names," and has published it as simply The Moneypaper since that time.

Nelson was also involved in the creation of Temper of the Times Investor Services, Inc., a specialized broker that was initially created as a service for subscribers to The Moneypaper.

In 1999, she organized the MP 63 Fund (DRIPX), which she co-managed with David Fish, who also functioned as the executive editor of Moneypaper Inc. publications.

Her writing credits include Create and Manage Your Own Mutual Fund, co-authored with Donald J. Korn in 1994. She also is the editor for the yearly publication, The Moneypaper's Guide to Direct Investment Plans.

== Commentary ==
The following are a catalog of Vita Nelson's commentary in various publications.

The Wall Street Journal cited Nelson in a July 1999 article on DRIPs.

Forbes magazine cited Nelson in a December, 2000 article.

The Bull and Bear, a financial newsletter, ran an article authored by Vita Nelson in their December, 1999 issue.

The New York Times consulted Nelson for an article on DRIPs in September, 2000.

The Washington Post quotes Nelson in an article concerning DRIPs in a July, 1999 issue.
