= De Vita =

De Vita is a surname. Notable people with the surname include:

- Corrado De Vita (1905–1987), Italian journalist and writer
- Franco De Vita (born 1954), Venezuelan singer-songwriter
- Giuseppe De Vita (born 1982), Italian rower
- Paolo De Vita (born 1957), Italian actor
- Pasquale De Vita (born 1994), Italian footballer
- Pier Lorenzo De Vita (1909–1990), Italian comic book artist
- Raffaele De Vita (born 1987), Italian footballer
- Tony De Vita (1932–1998), Italian composer, conductor, arranger and pianist

== See also ==
- DeVito, another surname
- Vita (surname)
