= Temper of the Times Investor Services =

Temper of the Times Investor Services Inc.
- Company type: Private company
- Industry: Financial services
- Founded: October 1, 1981
- Defunct: June 8, 2021
- Fate: Unknown
- Headquarters: Harrison, New York, United States
- Key people: Leonard Barenboim (President/CCO)
- Website: www.temperofthetimes.com

Temper of the Times Investor Services was an American specialized broker/dealer that enrolled potential investors in Dividend Reinvestment Plans (DRP) by buying initial shares and transferring ownership to the investor. The broker was deregistered by FINRA on the June 8 2021.

== History ==
First incorporated in 1981 as Temper of the Times Communications, Inc., it was the publishing company for the financial newsletter The Moneypaper. In the May 1986 issue of The Moneypaper, Temper first printed an order form for subscribers to use to become enrolled in company DRP programs.

In 1996, Temper split into two separate companies: The Moneypaper, Inc. became the publishing company, and Temper of the Times Communications, Inc. was renamed Temper of the Times Investor Services, Inc. and was registered with the Financial Industry Regulatory Authority (FINRA) as a broker/dealer. It was the only brokerage whose only service was to facilitate enrollment in Dividend Reinvestment Plans (DRPs or DRIPs), and had been used by The Motley Fool in its "Starting Direct Investment Plans" article, where it was referred to as "the most reasonable service that we know of for enrolling in DRPs."

Forbes.com wrote concerning Temper:

If you're still convinced that DRIPs are for you, here's more:

Most plans require that new members already own stock in the company, often as little as one share. Buy this share through a broker, but be sure it is registered in your own name, not in a street name. The broker will probably charge a fee for the paper certificate.

You can buy into a DRIP through the company's plan administrator...or through a service like Temper of the Times Communications, a... company that charges a flat (fee) to set up a DRIP account with most companies' programs. Temper enrolls you in the program, charging a commission of between 5 cents and 50 cents a share to buy stock for your DRIP account. Depending on your circumstances, such a plan makes sense.

Temper said it was for investors who "prefer to do their own research on companies, who plan to invest on a regular basis in the companies to build up their holdings and who don't want brokers hounding them all the time with the latest news on another stock," according to a 2008 article on InvestmentNews.com

The focus on DRIPs was to "allow small investors to put in minimal amounts of money without paying a broker fee for each purchase. With only a small initial fee, small investors without a lot of money could afford to buy stocks in small amounts, generally getting a better return than they would in the interest on savings or checking accounts at banks."

== Mentions ==
- "Fool.com: Drip Portfolio" cites that through the Temper of the Times service, "anyone can buy initial shares of more than 1,100 companies in order to be enrolled in their Drips."
- "How a Fool can invest in Drips" again cites Temper of the Times as an easy way for new investors to enroll in DRIPs.
- The Wall Street Journal mentioned Temper of the Times as an organization that will "help you enroll in DRIPs by buying the necessary shares and then getting you signed up."
- Temper also appears in the book Raising Money Smart Kids: What They Need to Know About Money—And How to Tell Them, by Janet Bodner, who, in the course of her discussion about DRIP investing writes that "The Temper Enrollment Service specializes in purchasing the number of shares to enroll in a DRP--sometimes as few as one, which lets you bypass high minimums for company-direct plans."
- BusinessWeek Online quotes former marketing VP John Sandfort and suggests Temper as a way to bypass brokers using the web.
- The Washington Post cites Temper as a way to "avoid brokerage commissions and the hassle of getting a certificate mailed," when enrolling in a DRIP.
