= Vitas (disambiguation) =

Vitas (born 1979) is a Russian–Ukrainian singer.

Vitas may also refer to:

- VITAS Healthcare, the largest provider of hospice care in the U.S.
- Vitas (Bishop of Lithuania) (died ca. 1269), Dominican priest and bishop
- Vitas Gerulaitis (1954–1994), Lithuanian-American professional tennis player

== See also ==
- Vita (disambiguation)
