= Vita Zaverukha =

Ukrainian far-right activist & militant (born 1996)

- Вікторія Заверуха
- Born: 1996 (age 29–30); Vinnytsia, Ukraine
- Military career
- Allegiance: Aidar
- Service years: 2014–2015

Victoria Ihorivna Zaverukha (Ukrainian: Вікторія Ігорівна Заверуха; born 1996), better known as Vita Zaverukha, is a Ukrainian nationalist militant and ex-member of the volunteer battalion Aidar. Following Elle France's publication in 2014 of an article on pro-government female fighters in the war in Donbas, she became known for publishing neo-Nazi content on social media. In 2015, she was arrested on charges of participating in a robbery in Kyiv that resulted in the death of two policemen of the Berkut special force. A public campaign for her liberation developed from nationalist right-wing circles. She was released on bail in 2017 and later released from the investigation. Following the 2022 Russian invasion, she reportedly joined the territorial defense near Kyiv.

== Biography ==
Zaverukha joined Euromaidan and took part in the storming of the Vinnytsia regional state administration in January 2014. She did not belong to any organisation but was active in the area of the far-right and the Right Sector. After the outbreak of war in Donbas in April 2014, she joined the volunteer battalion Aidar, which was active in the Luhansk region.

Zaverukha first became known in Russia for calling for the suppression of the Russian minority in Ukraine and for posting neo-Nazi content on social media. In France and elsewhere she became known following the publication in the French magazine Elle, on 14 November 2014, of a report on women in the armed conflict in Donbas, in which Zaverukha was interviewed and photographed. At the end of December 2014, the Ukrainian-American pianist Valentina Lisitsa discovered that Zaverukha had posted images of herself making the Nazi salute and wearing a swastika, and joined a social media campaign to protest the Elle article. Faced with numerous criticisms, Elle editorial board issued a statement on 30 December saying that it was "shocked" by the news of Zaverukha's neo-Nazi background and condemned any xenophobic, antisemitic, racist and Nazi ideology.

In April 2015 Zaverukha was arrested on charges of participating in an armed robbery at a gas station that had taken place on 4 May 2015 in Kyiv. Reportredly, the police had chased the car carrying a group of robbers from a petrol station. A shootout ensued, two policemen were killed and three wounded, one robber died, and two escaped but were arrested some time later. One of the alleged robbers confessed on camera that Zaverukha had participated in the robbery. According to investigators, the group was preparing a terrorist attack in Kyiv. Following the arrest, Zaverukha and the other suspects in custody claimed that they were subjected to torture.

Since the victims belonged to a police special force (Berkut) that had been responsible for violence against Automaidan in January 2014, and the alleged perpetrators were far-right activists and former volunteers of the Aidar, "Shakhtarsk" Tornado and Azov battalions, their supporters regarded them not as criminals, but as avengers of the people, and believed that the robbery at the gas station was a police set-up. In September 2015, the website of the far-right group All-Ukrainian Organization ″Trident″ named after Stepan Bandera reported that Zaverukha had been awarded the medal "For sacrifice and love for Ukraine" by the Patriarch of the Ukrainian Orthodox Church of the Kyiv Patriarchate Filaret. The information was confirmed by Zaverukha's lawyer but not by the Kyiv Patriarchate.

Court hearings in her case were repeatedly postponed, picketed and disrupted, and in November 2016 a people's deputy from Popular Front, Yuriy Tymoshenko, handcuffed himself to Zaverukha during a courtroom hearing and warned that any attempt to remove the wrist bracelets would have been regarded as an attack on the deputy's immunity.

In January 2017 Zaverukha was released on bail (1.6 million hryvnias) paid by Oleksiy Tamrazov and later released from the investigation.

In February she and her partner Oles Chernyak said they were beaten by members of political group C14, which had supported the campaign for their release.

In July 2017 Zaverukha and her partner were involved in an attack on transgender activists in Kyiv.

In 2020, a human rights report by the US State Department stated that Vita Zaverukha and other activists of the Unknown Patriot group were among the suspects in an attack on participants of the 8 March women's rights rally.

It was reported that on July 8, 2021, she was involved in counter-demonstrations against environmentalists campaigning to preserve Lake Vyrlytsia.

In March 2022 she reportedly joined the territorial defense near Kyiv.
