= Hong Kong plastic shopping bag environmental levy scheme =

Waste management program in Hong Kong

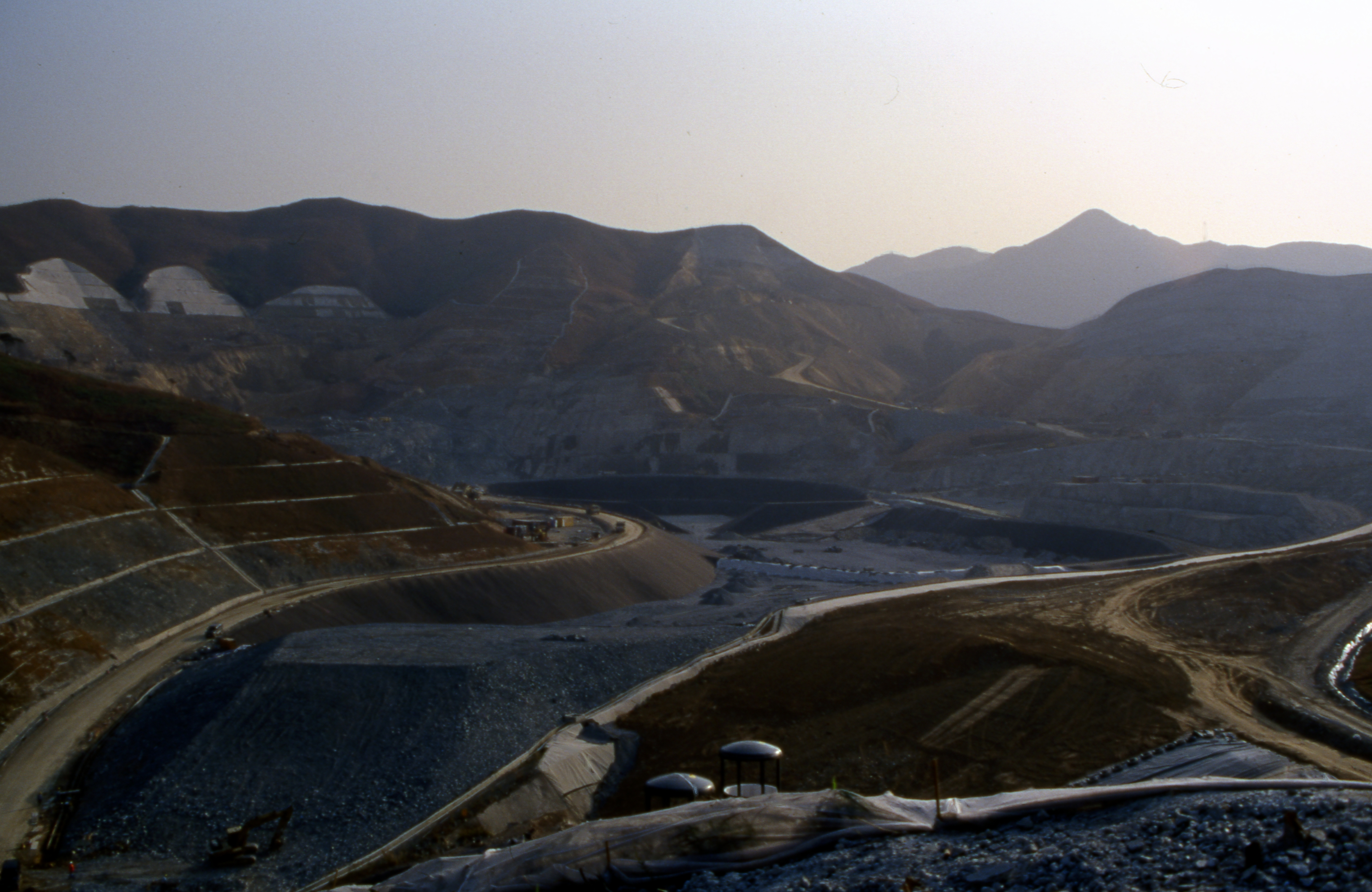
A landfill in Hong Kong

The Hong Kong plastic shopping bag environmental levy scheme is an environmental levy scheme designed to reduce the manufacture and distribution of plastic shopping bags (PSBs) in Hong Kong. PSBs are made of materials that are not easily degradable, and as such, their extensive disposal is putting pressure on the very limited landfill capacity of Hong Kong, leading to waste problems.

On 7 July 2009, the Government of Hong Kong initiated the first Mandatory Producer Responsibility Scheme (MPRS) under the Producer Product Eco-Responsibility Ordinance. Registered retailers are bound to charge consumers 50 cents as an environmental levy for each plastic bag taken. The levy scheme aims to generate direct economic disincentives and encourage consumers to refrain from using PSBs indiscriminately. The ultimate goal is to cultivate a habit of "Bring your Own Bag" (BYOB) within society.

The full implementation of PSB charging came into effect on 1 April 2015. All retailers are required to collect not less than HK$0.50 for each plastic bag distributed. To streamline the compliance mechanism and enhance the deterrent effect, a fixed-penalty notice of HK$2,000 was imposed on retailers who fail to comply with the legislation.

== History ==
=== First phase implementation ===
In 2005, it was estimated that in the territory over 8 billion PSBs were disposed of annually at landfills, which suggested an average disposal of over three PSBs per person each day, accounting for 11 per cent of the municipal solid waste disposed in the territory. Consequently, the Council for Sustainable Development proposed that the government should introduce a legislation for MPRS. MPRS emphasises the sharing of "eco-responsibility", and aims to provide economic incentives for citizens to change their wasteful habits. Since PSBs are made of non-degradable material and will permanently occupy landfills' capacity, promoting BYOB is seen to be the most effective solution to alleviate the environmental problem.

A comprehensive working schedule was subsequently formed. In 2006, the Product Eco-Responsibility Bill was introduced to the Legislative Council, providing a legal framework for MPRS. With the Bill in place, the Environmental Protection Department (EPD) further put forward the legislation on PSB Charging in 2007.

The registered retailers covered by the first phase implementation were predominately chain operators, including convenience stores, supermarkets, cosmetics and medicare (the retail category).

=== Full implementation ===
First phase of the levy scheme has achieved preliminary success, yet the overall result was incomprehensive. Firstly, the scheme only covered 3,000 registered retail outlets, and the PSB disposal originated from other non-registered retailers had increased by 6.7% since the first phase implementation. Secondly, EPD estimated that Hong Kong people's daily usage of PSB was still substantially higher than other overseas developed economies.

From the figure gathered in 2010, Hong Kong has around 60,000 retail outlets, in which over 98% are operated by small and medium enterprises (SMEs). In order to achieve a more profound outcome, EPD extended the scope of the levy scheme to cover all retail sales of goods regardless of their business scale and business nature.

== The levy scheme ==
=== Scope ===
The levy scheme has expanded to cover more than 100,000 retail outlets, including both retail and service businesses. Retail outlets are broadly categorised into four business groups: (i) retailers selling foodstuff; (ii) retailers selling non-foodstuff; (iii) retailers selling foodstuff and non-foodstuff such as department stores; and (iv) service businesses with sales of goods.

=== The PSB charge ===
The PSB charge makes it so sellers of goods by retail charge customers no less than 50 cents for each PSB, or for product with prepackaged pack of 10 or more PSBs. This is irrespective of whether the PSBs are distributed directly or indirectly for the promotion of goods, or in connection with the sales. The seller must not offer any rebate or discount to the customer with the effect of directly offsetting the PSB charge or any part of that amount.

The 50 cents charge was generally considered to be a moderate levy which could provide incentives for consumeres to reduce the use of PSBs, but not exceeding the level of public acceptance.

=== Bags subject to the charge ===
In order to promote the green habit of BYOB, extensive forms of PSBs are covered under the second phase of the levy scheme, including all bags that are made wholly or partly of plastic regardless of whether there is a carrying device. The types of shopping bags listed below are subject to the Charge:

Plastic bags with flat-tops, handle, handle hole, perforated line for tearing out handle hole, carrying string or strap, and any other devices attached to the bag.

Paper bags with plastic lamination, plastic components, plastic handles and plastic accessories.

Non-woven bags, also known as environmental bags, which are made of plastic.

=== Exemption arrangements ===
Types of PSBs are exempted from PSB charging.

- Bag used for food hygiene reasons: Due to food hygiene concerns, PSBs that carry only foodstuff (i.e. food, drink or medicine) without packaging or not in airtight packaging will not be charged. In order to separate the condensation of water vapour from other goods, PSBs which carry frozen or chilled foodstuff are also exempted.
- Bags used for packaging: This includes sealed bag for prepackaging. The exemption covers PSBs that are used for prepackaging and have been sealed before they are delivered to retailers. However, additional plastic bags for the prepackaged production will be charged. In the case of plastic bags that form part of the goods, the charge does not apply if the PSBs are (i) designed specifically for containing the goods; (ii) holding perishable goods; (iii) containing goods in liquid form or goods that are in liquid; and (iv) printed with information on how to consume or use the goods.
- Bags provided with the services: PSBs that are distributed by retailers as part of the service tendered, and without involving the retail sales of goods are not subject to charge.

=== Penalty ===
If a retailer is found to have committed an offence by failing to comply with the levy scheme, the EPD officers may issue a fixed penalty notice requiring the offender to pay a fixed amount of $2,000.

For breaches of serious nature, the EPD may initiate prosecution against the offender, who is liable on conviction to a maximum fine of $100,000 on the first occasion, and $200,000 on each subsequent occasion.

== Consultation ==
=== Prior to the first phase implementation ===
Plastic bags manufacturers: The Hong Kong Plastic Bags Manufacturers' Association opposed to the proposed environmental levy, alleging that PSBs were more environmentally friendly than other single-use carriers such as paper bags. Besides, the levy scheme was unnecessary since PSBs were habitually reused by the public.

Retailers: The Hong Kong Retail Management Association raised objections to the levy scheme, contending that chain stores were being unfairly targeted under the proposal. In fact, these retailers had done the most to encourage citizens to reduce the use of PSB. The effectiveness of the proposal was also questionable due to its limited coverage, and consumers could easily resort to other free sources of PSBs.

Legislative Council: In the meetings held by the Legco Panel on Environmental Affairs, the vast majority of political parties and deputations backed the principle of "polluter pays". However, some Legco members argued that the Charge should be lowered to 10 to 20 cents in order to reduce its impact on the impoverished. Besides, the government should reinforce the voluntary efforts on PSB reduction before introducing the levy. There were also concerns as to whether the levy constituted another form of Goods and Services Tax, causing adverse effects on the trade sector.

General public: With reference to the public opinion survey conducted in 2007 by the Center of Communication Research of the Chinese University of Hong Kong, among the 1,102 telephone interviews conducted, only 66% of the respondents supported the introduction of an environmental tax on PSBs.

Before the first phase implementation, the Public Opinion Programme of the University of Hong Kong conducted another three-stage survey to gauge public opinion. The feedbacks were largely positive. Around 80% of all the respondents considered that the tax was effective in reducing the use of PSBs, and the majority of them opined that a 50 cent charge would not add to their financial burden. In the third stage survey, two-thirds of the respondents even urged for an extension of PSB tax to all retail shops.

=== Prior to the full implementation ===
Plastic bags manufacturers: In 2011, the Hong Kong Plastic Bags Manufacturers' Association demanded the government to withdraw the levy scheme, as the association alleged that non-woven bags and rubbish bags were treated as alternatives of PSBs, causing an overall increase of plastic materials used in producing plastic carriers. As an alternative, the association lobbied the government to support the development of eco-friendly biodegradable PSBs.

Retailers: In contrast with the first phase implementation, the Hong Kong Retail Management Association welcomed the expansion of the levy scheme. In particular, the association supported the second phase amendment as it allowed the retailers to retain the PSB Charge without remitting them to the government. This would prevent SMEs from incurring extra administrative costs.

General public: On 17 May 2011, the EPD released the consultation document "Extension of the Environmental Levy Scheme on Plastic Shopping Bags". The consultation focused on five main aspects: (i) the expansion of the Scheme; (ii) the coverage of retailers; (iii) the exemption for food hygiene purpose; (iv) the regulation of flat-top bags; and (v) handling of the collected charges.

The then Secretary for the Environment Edward Yau announced that amongst the 1,000 public feedbacks received by the EPD, the majority acknowledged the success of the first phase implementation, and their opinion on issues (i) to (v) were largely in line with the proposed particulars of the full implementation.

== Progress, effectiveness and limitations ==
=== First phase implementation ===
PSB disposal at landfills: Two landfill surveys were conducted by the EPD in mid-2009 and mid-2010. According to the survey results, there was a significant 75% of decrease of PSB disposal in mid-2010 than in mid-2009. The EPD estimated that these registered retail categories were accountable for 65% of the pre-levy PSB distribution, and the overall reduction in PSB usage could be as high as 90%.

Hong Kong people still disposed of 1.7 PSBs per person per day. Taking Ireland as a comparator, each person disposed of only 0.9 PSB daily even before the introduction of an environmental tax.

Opinion survey: With reference to the telephone survey conducted by the Central Policy Unit, more than 75% of the interviewers did not take PSBs when shopping at a registered outlet. Besides, around 80% of respondents reckoned that they have developed the habit of BYOB.

A major concern was raised by the Hong Kong Plastic Bags Manufacturers' Association. It was found that the use of non-woven bags and rubbish bags had surged by 96% and 63% respectively. As a result, the overall plastic materials used by the industry has escalated by 27% when compared to the post-2009 figure. Unlike non-woven bags, rubbish bags could not be reused and would end up being piled up at landfills.

=== Full implementation ===
PSB disposal at landfills: Annual disposal surveys were conducted at landfills and Refuse Transfer Stations (RTS). In order to study the full year disposal figures of PSBs after the second phase implementation, the EPD randomly elected 282 waste samples from landfills and RTS between October and December 2015. Broadly speaking, PSB landfill disposal has reduced by 25% after the extension of PSB Charging (i.e. from approximately 5.24 billion in 2014 to about 3.93 billion in 2015).

(1) Retail categories

As most of the retail outlets are covered by the first phase legislation, the total PSB disposal was estimated to have reduced by only 35%, and such reduction was mainly driven by retail outlets falling outside the scope of the original legislation.

(2) Non-food-related retail categories

The non-food-related retail categories achieved the most compelling results. The reduction of PSB disposal ranged from 34% for fashion and footwear shops to approximately 83% for newspaper and magazine outlets.

(3) Food-related retail categories

Most of the products within the food-related retail categories fell within the food hygiene exemption. Hence, the outcome was insignificant. In particular, for cooked food outlets, the disposal rate remained more or less the same before and after the second phase implementation. Nevertheless, it is observed that there was a 20% decrease of PSB disposal from bakeries and cake shops, mainly because more sellers are aware of not using multiple-layer wrapping bags for bakery items.

Opinion survey: Telephone surveys were carried out between February and Mary 2016. Around 1,000 interviewers gave feedbacks on their behavioural change subsequent to the full implementation of the levy scheme. The outcome was generally positive. Amongst the respondents, 85% of them opined that non-compliance of the Scheme was uncommon, where 79% of them comprehend that the full implementation of PSB could further enhance their habit of BYOB.

Enforcement actions: Since 1 May 2015, officers have started to take law enforcement actions against non-complying retailers and no longer given them verbal warnings. By the end of April 2017, 406 fixed penalty notices were issued. However, only 15 prosecutions were made against retailers. In July 2017, Greeners Action, a Hong Kong-based Non-Profit Organisation conducted an undercover operation to inspect 100 retail outlets, and it was found that more than half of them distributed PSBs to customers for free. Lenient law enforcement could be regarded as a hindrance to streamline compliance.

== Promotion ==
=== Events ===
District briefings: The EPD held district briefings in civic centres and community halls to raise the public's awareness of the levy scheme. District briefings are effective platforms to address the public's concerns and collect their opinion directly on the PSB charges, the scope of implementation and the exemption arrangements.

Educational visits: After the full implementation, the EPD officers paid educational visits to SMEs and wet markets. Since these retailers had relatively less administrative capability to fulfill the statutory requirements, and a fixed penalty notice was newly imposed on law offenders, officers recognised the importance of reminding sellers of their obligations.

=== Publicity materials ===
Information leaflets and materials: As distinguished from usual publicity materials, leaflets introducing the levy scheme were designed to carry multi-languages including Tagalog, Indonesian and Thai, so that foreign domestic helpers, one of the targeted participants of PSB Charging, could understand the messages.

Advertisements: Bus-Body and Tram-Body advertising, television and radio announcements were means used by the government to alert citizens about the commencement of the levy scheme.

== Overseas experience: alternatives to the levy scheme ==
Overseas jurisdictions have adopted different types of PSB reduction measures. These collective experiences may serve as valuable inputs for modifying Hong Kong's model.

=== Environmental levy at the manufacturing and import level ===
==== Denmark ====
In 1994, Denmark imposed a green tax on plastic bags. Manufacturers and importers of PSBs are required to pay a tax based on PSBs' weight, where retailers would buy PSBs at tax-loaded prices. This creates direct economic incentives for retailers to distribute PSBs tentatively. As retailers are not bound to pass on the tax to customers and charge them for PSBs, the levy would normally not raise the financial cost to consumers. After the introduction of levy, the distribution of PSBs has decreased by 60%. Nonetheless, the figure rebounded substantially as the tax rate has remained unchanged since 1998.

=== Ban on PSBs ===
==== United States ====
After failed attempts to introduce an environmental levy and meet PSB reduction targets by signing voluntary agreements with major supermarkets, San Francisco City Government passed a legislation to ban the use of PSBs in 2005, mandating the use of recyclable paper bags or compostable PSBs at retails. After this successful initiative, there was a trend in the United States to ban the use of PSBs. It was reported that over 132 cities and counties in 18 states introduced similar arrangements. In 2015, California City Government announced its statewide ban on PSBs in grocery stores, pharmacies and supermarkets. Liquor stores and small food retailers also joined the scheme in the following year. It was estimated that there was an 89% decrease of plastic bags litter in the storm drain system, and 60% in the creeks and rivers.

==== Australia ====
The Australian government also moved from adopting a voluntary approach to a total ban of PSBs. In 2003, a Code of Practice for the Management of Plastic Bags was signed between the Environment Protection and Heritage Council (EPHC) and the Australian Retailers Association. However, the targets on reduction of PSB disposal and recycling rate were barely met. EPHC therefore issued a public consultation document and received positive feedbacks that supported a complete ban on PSBs. By 2017, every state in Australia has banned or promised to ban lightweight plastic bags.

== Future development ==
It is repeatedly reported that Hong Kong consumers are gradually used to paying the 50 cents levy. In light of such situation, introducing a total ban on PSBs may be an alternative to propagate the idea of BYOB in the community and reduce PSB disposal.

The government is also advised to encourage retailers to donate the proceeds of the PSB Charge to environmental purposes. Alternatively, the government may consider collecting the Charge from sellers and depositing such amount in an "environmental fund" for waste reduction campaigns.

== See also ==
- Biodegradable waste
- Waste management in Hong Kong
