= Yuriy Tymoshenko =

Yuriy Tymoshenko may refer to:

- Yurii Tymoshenko, a Ukrainian activist, soldier, and politician (born 1961)
- Yury Tymoshenko, a Ukrainian Soviet actor, film director and screenwriter (1919–1986)
- Yurīy Tīmoshchenko, a Kazakh politician (born 1962)
