= Lo Kwee-seong =

Chairman of Vitasoy
- Succeeded by: Winston Lo

Personal details
- Born: 2 February 1910
- Died: 5 May 1995 (aged 85)
- Spouse(s): Elizabeth Lo Shing; Chu Tsuk Ping Maggie
- Relations: Victor Lo Tang-Seong (founder of Café de Coral); Lo Fong-cheung (founder of Fairwood)
- Children: Lo Kai Muk (1933–1997); Eugene Lo Yau Yan (b.1937); Myrna Lo Mo Ching (b.1939); Frank Lo Yau Yee (b.1940); Winston Lo Yau Lai (b.1941); Yvonne Lo Mo Ling (b.1948)
- Parent(s): Lo Chin Hing (b.1875); Lo Wong Yee Mui (b.1875)

Dr. Lo Kwee-seong, CBE, JP (traditional Chinese: 羅桂祥; simplified Chinese: 罗桂祥; pinyin: Luó Guìxiáng; Jyutping: lo4 gwai3 coeng4; 2 February 1910 – 5 May 1995) was a Hong Kong businessman, investor and philanthropist. He was the founder of the Vitasoy, a well-known soymilk drink company in Hong Kong. He was also an unofficial member of the Urban Council and the Legislative Council of Hong Kong and the chairman of the Hong Kong Consumer Council.

Lo died on 5 May 1995 at Queen Mary Hospital, aged 85. He was survived by his wife Elizabeth Lo Shing. His business position was succeeded by his son Winston Lo Yau-lai.

Political offices
Preceded by Kan Yuet-keung	Chairman of Hong Kong Consumer Council; 1975–1980	Succeeded by Gallant Ho
