= Veta =

Veta may refer to:

- Veta (Bela Palanka), a village in the municipality of Bela Palanka, Serbia
- Veța, a village administered by Miercurea Nirajului town, Mureș County, Romania
- Veta Pass, a mountain pass in Colorado, United States - see La Veta Pass
- Veta (1986 film), an Indian Telugu-language period action film
- Veta (2014 film), an Indian Telugu action film
- Veta Biriș (born 1949), Romanian folk music singer
- A mathematical finance parameter

== See also ==
- La Veta, Colorado, United States, a statutory town
- La Veta Pass, two mountain passes near Veta Pass
