= Vita (surname) =

Vita is a surname. Notable people with the surname include:

- Alessio Vita (born 1993), Italian footballer
- Carol Vita, American politician
- Claudine Vita (born 1996), German athlete
- Kimpa Vita (1684–1706), Kongolese prophet and leader of her own Christian movement
- Lucas Vita (born 1985), Brazilian water polo player
- Marcelo Vita (born 1963), Brazilian former footballer and manager

== See also ==
- De Vita, another surname
