= The Moneypaper =

- Editor: Vita Nelson
- Categories: Finance
- Frequency: Monthly
- Circulation: 17,094 (Oct. 2009)
- Publisher: The Moneypaper, Inc.
- First issue: April 1982
- Country: United States
- Based in: Rye, NY
- Language: English
- Website: DirectInvesting.com
- ISSN: 0745-9858

The Moneypaper is a monthly financial newsletter published by The Moneypaper, Inc. that is geared towards the small investor and long-term investing strategies. Its name comes from the original format of the publication, that of a newspaper. Its current format is that of a magazine. New issues are released every month.

== History ==
Vita Nelson first had the idea for The Moneypaper in 1981, shortly after selling her previous publishing venture, Westchester Magazine, in 1980. With the help of publisher Joyce Gruenberg, Circulation manager Lucy Banker, and Executive Editor Mark Fowler, the first issue of The Moneypaper was published in April 1982, with the subheading “A Financial Publication for Women.” The subheading was removed beginning with the December 1985 issue when Vita "started hearing from men who read the newsletter but subscribed to it under their wives' names."

The Moneypaper contains a mixture of commentary and financial data, and includes a section that summarizes important financial news and trends, as well as suggestions on stock portfolios to build and stock picks from equity specialists Currently, it is based in Harrison, NY.

== Media Mentions ==
A subscription to The Moneypaper was among the suggestions for fiscally aware gifts in the Dec. 18, 1994 issue of the LA Times.
