= Vita, Ávila =

Vita
- Municipality
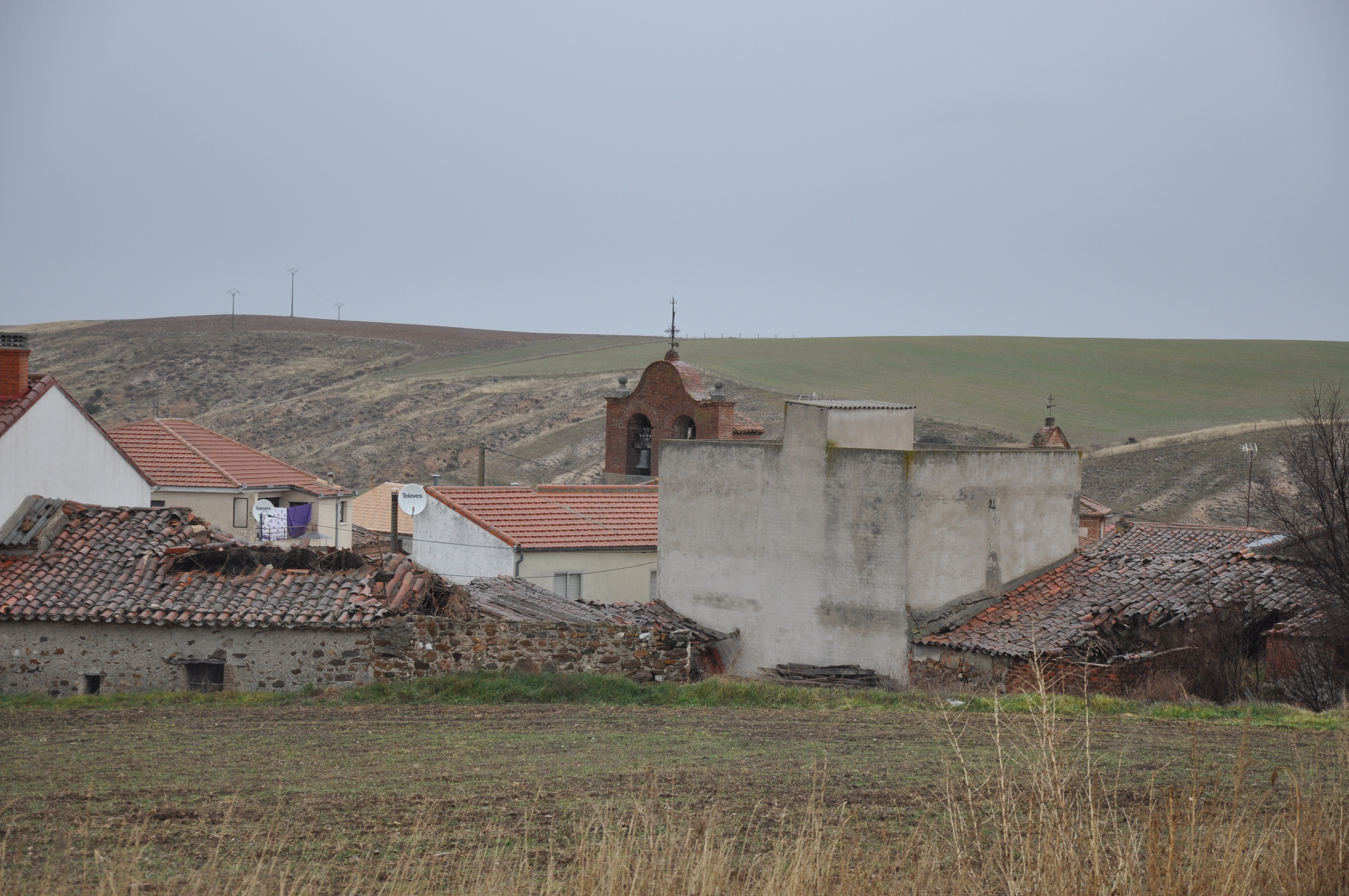
- Panorama of Vita

- Flag Coat of arms

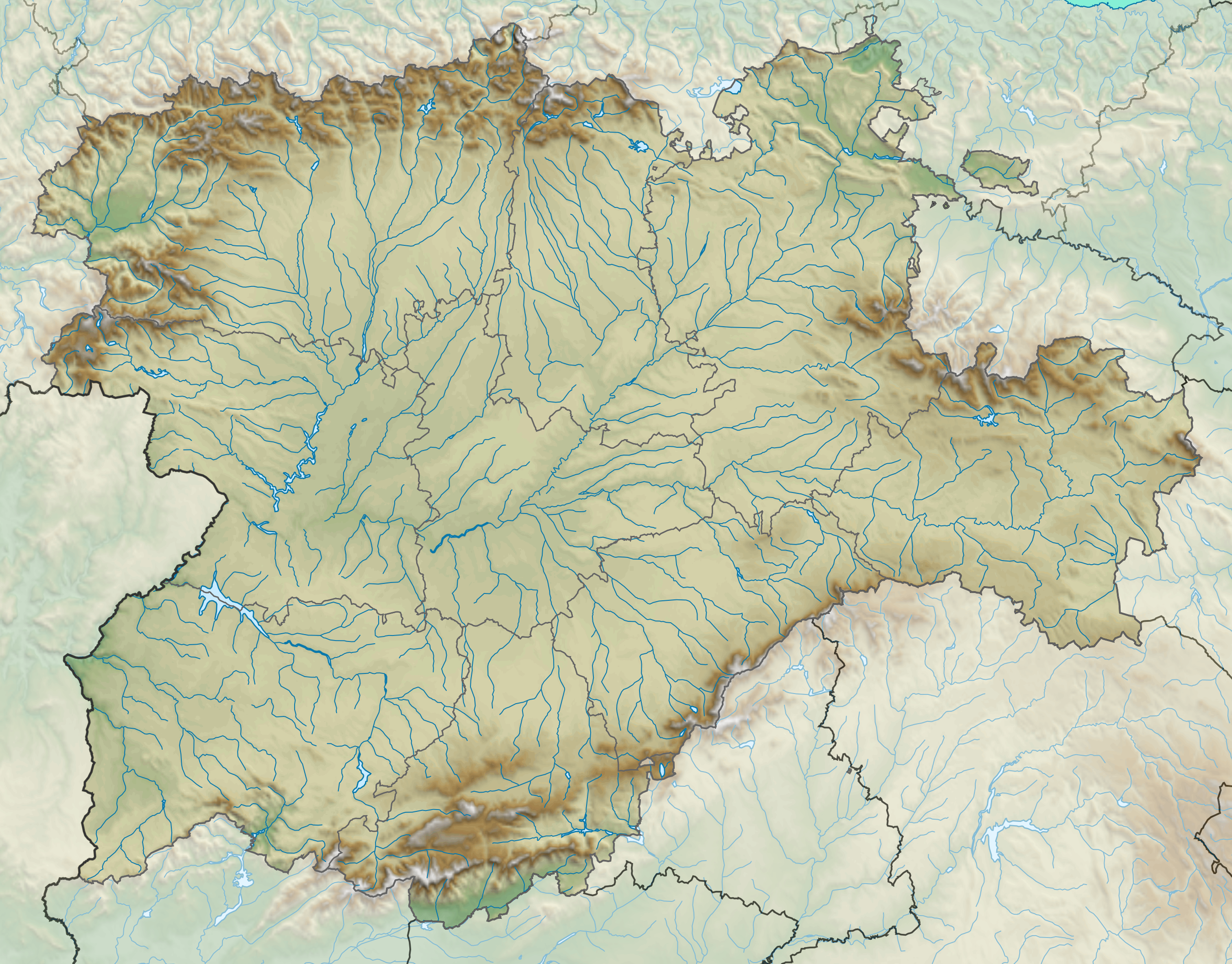
- Location within Castile and León Location within Spain
- Coordinates: 40°48′43″N 5°00′17″W
- Country: Spain
- Autonomous community: Castile and León
- Province: Ávila

Area
  - Total: 16.59 km^{2} (6.41 sq mi)
- Elevation: 993 m (3,258 ft)

Population (2025-01-01)
  - Total: 81
  - Density: 4.9/km^{2} (13/sq mi)
- Time zone: CET
  - Summer (DST): CEST

Vita is a municipality in the province of Ávila and autonomous community of Castile and León, Spain. The municipality covers an area of 16.59 square kilometres (6.41 sq mi).

== Population ==
Historical population
Year	Pop.	±% p.a.
2023	79	—
2024	71	−10.13%
2025	81	+14.08%
Source: INE
