= Vitasoy =

Hong Kong beverage company

Vitasoy International Holdings Ltd.
- Type: Public company
- Traded as: SEHK: 345
- Industry: Food & Drinks
- Founded: 3 April 1940; 86 years ago
- Headquarters: Tuen Mun, Hong Kong
- Key people: Roberto Guidetti (CEO)
- Products: Plant milk, tofu, beverages
- Website: vitasoy.com

Vitasoy International Holdings Limited
- Traditional Chinese: 維他奶國際集團有限公司
- Simplified Chinese: 维他奶国际集团有限公司
Transcriptions
Standard Mandarin
- Hanyu Pinyin: Wéitā'nǎi Guójì Jítuán Yǒuxiàngōngsī
- Wade–Giles: Wei-tʻa-nai Kuo-chi Chi-tʻuan Yu-hsien-kung-ssŭ
Yue: Cantonese
- Yale Romanization: Wàitā'náaih Gwokjai Jaahptyùn Yáuhhaahn Gūngsī
- Jyutping: Wai4ta1naai5 Gwok3zai3 Zaap6tyun4 Yau5haan6 Gung1si1

Vitasoy
- Traditional Chinese: 維他奶
- Simplified Chinese: 维他奶
Transcriptions
Standard Mandarin
- Hanyu Pinyin: Wéitā'nǎi
- Wade–Giles: Wei-tʻa-nai
Yue: Cantonese
- Yale Romanization: Wàitā'náaih
- Jyutping: Wai4ta1naai5

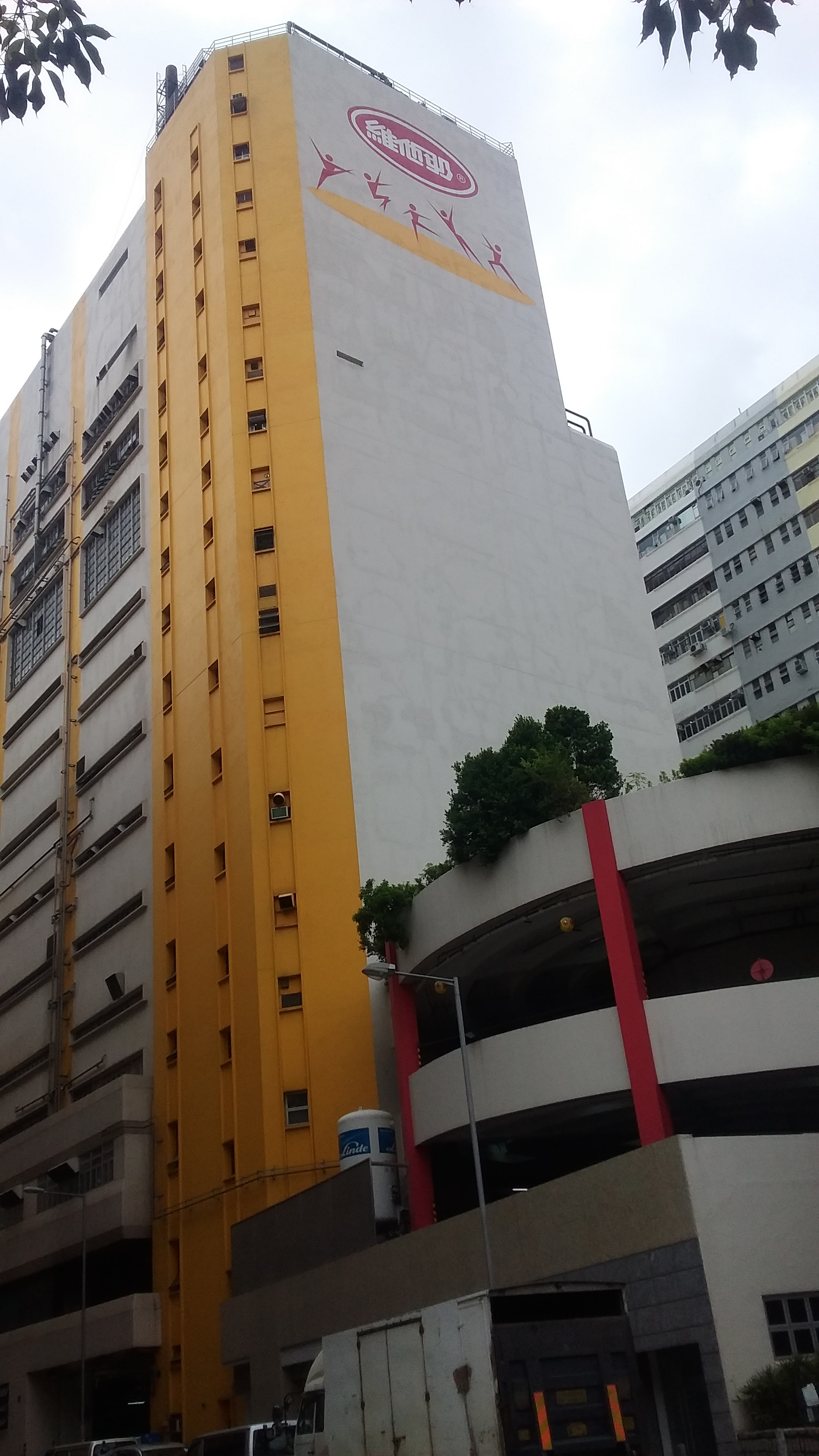
Head office

Vitasoy International Holdings Limited (Chinese: 維他奶) is a Hong Kong beverage company. It hosts a brand of beverages and desserts named Vita. Founded in 1940, it is based in Tuen Mun, New Territories, Hong Kong.

Vitasoy products were centred on the high-protein soy milk drink that the company first produced. Over the years the company expanded into a wider variety of beverages. Some of them (such as fruit juice, milk, tea, soft drinks, water, and tofu) under the "Vita" brand.

Vitaland Services Limited was founded in 1991. It specialises in the operation of the tuck shops in Hong Kong primary and secondary schools and the canteen business. "Vitasoy" also established "Hong Kong Gourmet" in 2001 to provide catering services to primary and secondary schools, and meetings.

== History ==
=== Founder ===
Vitasoy was founded by Lo Kwee-seong (1910–1995) on 9 March 1940 in Hong Kong with door-to-door delivery of soy milk, selected as a product because many Chinese people are lactose intolerant. The company ceased operations from 1941 to 1945 during the Japanese occupation of Hong Kong. It re-emerged after the war ended.

The soy milk was first delivered to people's homes on bicycle, but then began selling through retail outlets. By 1950, with sales increasing, Vitasoy established a new factory. In 1953, it adopted a sterilisation technology enabling the drinks to be stored without refrigeration. In 1975, Vitasoy became the first Hong Kong company to introduce Tetra Pak packaging technology for drinks production. This involves UHT (ultra-heat treatment) sterilisation of the product and packaging in aseptic cartons so the drink could be kept for months without refrigeration.

Vitasoy started to expand into overseas markets in the 80s and 90s. Yvonne Lo, the daughter of Dr. Kwee Seong Lo, introduced their soy milks to the U.S. and Canada (Yvonne graduated from the University of Toronto and worked as city planner there for six years) in 1979–1980. Vitasoy's North American first head office opened in San Francisco in 1979 as a joint venture with Yvonne's Soy Bean Products Company NA Inc. before becoming subsidiary Vitasoy USA in 1982. With acquisition of Nasoya head office moved to Ayer, Massachusetts, in 1998. With the divesting of Nasoya in 2016, Vitasoy moved to a small office in Woburn, Massachusetts, with no production facilities in North America. In 2018 Vitasoy USA became Vitasoy North America LLC and relocated to Toronto with Woburn responsible for US market only.

Vitasoy have seen their revenue double in the past decade and reaching to almost a billion US dollars, where China (including Hong Kong) accounts for more than 80% of total sales, with the rest of the revenue coming from markets in Australia, Singapore, Philippines and additional exports going to more than 40 nations.

=== Development of other brands ===
In 1976, Vitasoy launched a series of juice drinks, and subsequently launched lemon tea, chrysanthemum tea and other drinks in 1978 and 1979.

In 1994, the firm established a new factory in Shenzhen City as the first Hong Kong foreign plant. Four years later, it established new factories in Shanghai and Ayer, Massachusetts in the United States. In 2001, it opened a manufacturing plant in Australia. In 2008, it acquired Unicurd Food Co. (Private) Ltd., a tofu manufacturing company in Singapore. Vitasoy's plants in Foshan and Wuhan, mainland China, were opened in 2011 and 2016 respectively. In 2016, Vitasoy divested certain assets of its North American operation (Nasoya, Azumaya and San Sui lines). Vitasoy USA continues its sales and distribution of Asian import beverage business in North America. Vitasoy drinks can also be purchased in the European Union and United Kingdom through local supermarket chains.

=== Controversy ===
In July 2021, Vitasoy became a target of a boycott in mainland China. Several days prior, a Vitasoy employee had randomly stabbed a Hong Kong police officer from behind, causing a 10 cm deep wound that reached the victim's lungs. The perpetrator also stabbed himself and died afterwards. The following day, certain Vitasoy employees had shared a memo calling the death of their employee unfortunate and offered condolences to his family. The memo however caused significant backlash in mainland China. The share price of Vitasoy at the Hong Kong Stock Exchange plummeted 12% on Monday 5 July 2021, the first trading day after the memo went viral on social media.

== Products ==
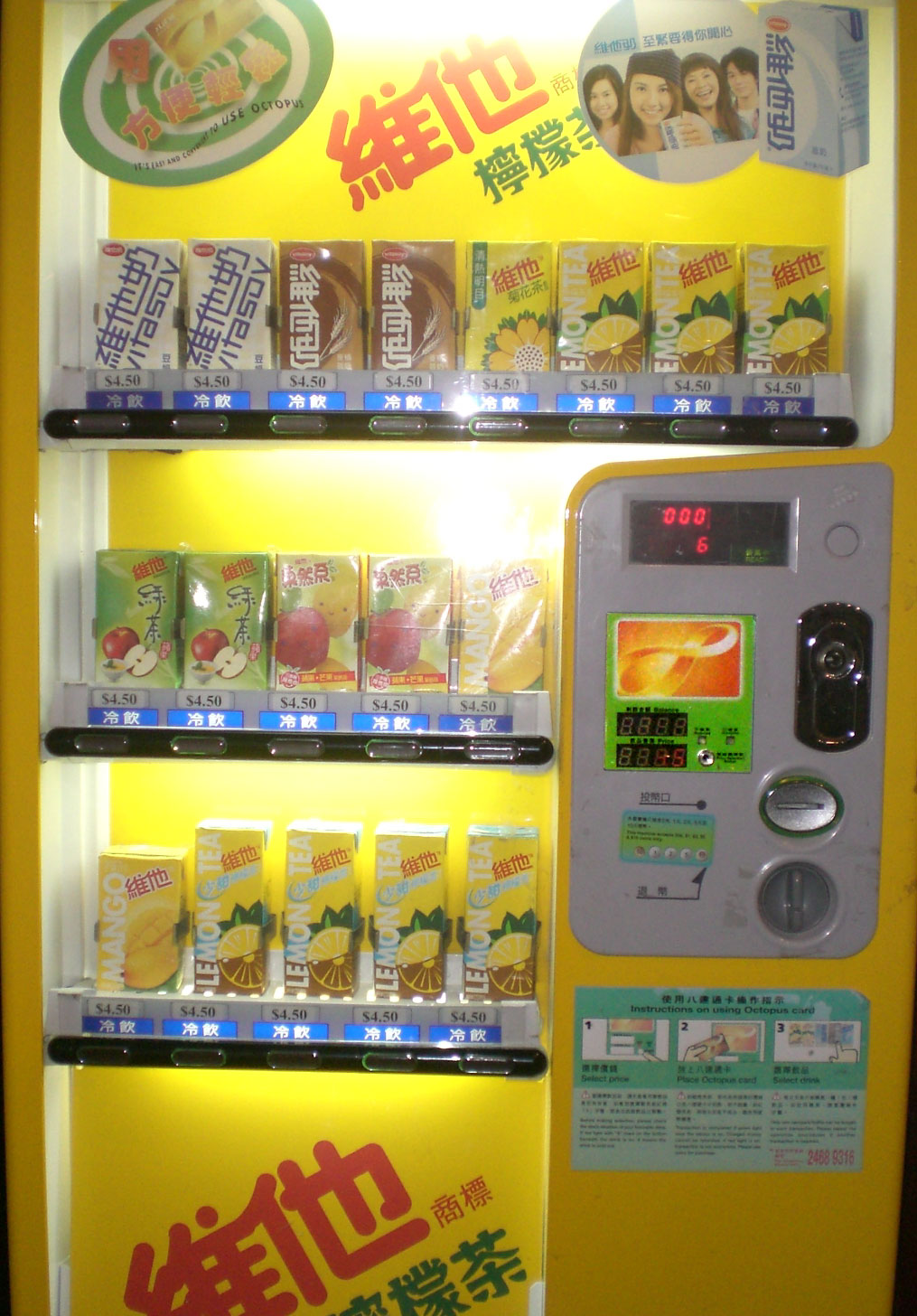
Vitasoy products in a vending machine commonplace in Hong Kong

Vitasoy produces soy milk and tofu in a variety of flavours. The company also produces a range of non-soy plant milks. Vitasoy also offers juices, coffee, teas, and water under the generic Vita brand.

== Facilities/Offices ==
China/Asia

- Tuen Mun, Hong Kong – head office and plant; boxed drinks to Hong Kong and overseas markets
- Shenzhen, China – for Chinese and Hong Kong markets
- Shanghai, China – for Chinese and Hong Kong markets
- Foshan, China – for Chinese and Hong Kong markets
- Wuhan, China – for Chinese and Hong Kong markets
- Singapore – supplying to Singapore and overseas (excluding Australia/New Zealand/North America) markets under Singapore Unity Foods or Unicurd

Oceania

- Wodonga, Victoria, Australia – supplying to Australia and New Zealand. The Australian operation is a joint venture between Vitasoy International and Bega Dairy & Drinks.
- Melbourne, Australia – opened 2001 to supply Australian and New Zealand markets

North America

Since sale of Nasoya North America market is now supplied from Hong Kong.

- Ayer, Massachusetts – former head office and plant opened 1998 as joint Vitasoy and Nasoya Foods plant replacing Leominster, Massachusetts plant (opened by Nasoya in 1978); supplied North American market until Nasoya was sold to South Korea-based Pulmuone Foods in 2016
- Brisbane, California – former and first North American facility (opened 1985)
- Toronto – Vitasoy North America Inc. established in 2018 as North America head office (66 Wellington Street and in 2019 at 789 Don Mills Road)
- Woburn, Massachusetts – former North America head office from 2016 to 2018. Woburn office is closed and products shipped to U.S. with support from North American office in Toronto.

== See also ==
- List of food companies
- Yeo Hiap Seng
- Flagstaff House Teaware Museum K.S. Lo Gallery – named for Vitasoy founder and donor of much of the museum's collection
- Companies of Hong Kong
- Manufacturing in Hong Kong
