= Life (disambiguation) =

Life is the characteristic that distinguishes organisms from inorganic substances and dead objects.

Life or The Life may also refer to:

== Human life ==
- Human life (disambiguation)
- Human condition, the characteristics, events, and situations of human existence
- Biography, a written, filmed, etc. description of a person's life
  - Autobiography, an account of one's own life
- Everyday life, what a person does and feels on an everyday basis
- Personal life, an individual's life
- Life imprisonment, a sentence of imprisonment

== Arts and media ==
=== Films ===
- Life (1920 film), a lost 1920 American silent drama
- Life (1928 film), a British silent drama
- Life (1984 film), a Chinese film
- Life (1996 film), an Australian drama
- Life (1999 film), an American comedy
- The Life (2004 film), a Canadian made-for-TV drama
- Whore (2004 film), a Spanish drama also called The Life
- Life!, a 2005 Dutch film
- The Life (2012 film), a Ugandan film
- Life (2015 film), an American biopic
- Life (2017 film), an American science fiction horror film
- Life (2021 film), an Iranian short film

=== Gaming ===
- Life (gaming), a play-turn for a player-character
- The Game of Life, a board game
- Conway's Game of Life, a cellular automaton
- Life, development title for the 1983 Atari game Lifespan
- Life (gamer), alias of Korean former professional StarCraft II player Lee Seung-Hyun, convicted and banned from competition for match fixing

=== Music ===
==== Albums ====
- Life (Sly and the Family Stone album), 1968
- Life (Exuma album), 1973
- Life (Thin Lizzy album), 1983
- Life (Is So Strange), by War, 1983
- Life (Art Davis album), 1986
- Life (Neil Young & Crazy Horse album), 1987
- Life (Inspiral Carpets album), 1990
- Life (The Cardigans album), 1995
- Life (Simply Red album), 1995
- Life (Talisman album), 1995
- Life (soundtrack), soundtrack to the 1999 film
- Life, by Black Biscuits, featuring Vivian Hsu, 1999
- Life, by Nelson, 1999
- Life (Dope album), 2001
- Life (ZOEgirl album), 2001
- The Life (album), by Ginuwine, 2001
- Life, by Z-Ro, 2002
- Life (Frukwan album), 2003
- Life (Yo Gotti album), 2003
- Life (Andy Hunter album), 2005
- Life (Ricky Martin album), 2005
- Life (KRS-One album), 2006
- Life (Marcia Hines album), 2007
- Life (David "Fathead" Newman album), 2007
- Life (Angela Aki album), 2010
- Life (Cueshé album), 2010
- Life (Sage Francis album), 2010
- L.i.f.e, by Josh Osho, 2012
- Life (EP), by Heo Young-saeng, 2013
- L.I.F.E, by Burna Boy, 2013
- Life (Sigma album), 2015
- Life (Adagio album), 2017
- Life, by Boy George & Culture Club, 2018
- Life (Conrad Sewell album), 2019

==== Songs ====
- "Life" (Ana Johnsson song), 2004
- "Life" (Ayahi Takagaki song), 2009
- "Life" (Des'ree song), 1998
- "Life" (E-Type song), 2001
- "Life" (Elvis Presley song), 1971
- "The Life" (Fifth Harmony song), 2016
- "Life" (Gen Hoshino song), 2023
- "Life" (Haddaway song), 1993
- "Life" (K-Ci & JoJo song), 1999
- "Life" (Mika Nakashima song), 2007
- "Life Number 9" (also written "Life #9"), 2004
- "Life" (Our Lady Peace song), 2000
- "Life" (Ricky Nelson song), 1971
- "The Life" (Styles P song), 2002
- "Life" (Toše Proeski song), 2004
- "Life" (Yui song), 2005
- "Life (Diamonds in the Dark)", by John Dahlbäck, 2013
- "Life (Me no Mae no Mukō e)", by Kanjani8, 2010
- "The Life", by Alicia Keys from Songs in A Minor
- "Life", by ...And You Will Know Us by the Trail of Dead from So Divided
- "Life", by Atheist from Piece of Time
- "Life", by Audio Adrenaline from Audio Adrenaline
- "Life", by Ayumi Hamasaki from Mirrorcle World
- "Life", by Bleeding Through from Love Will Kill All
- "Life", by Collective Soul from See What You Started by Continuing
- "Life", by Conrad Sewell from Life
- "Life", by Devin Townsend from Ocean Machine: Biomech
- "The Life", by Dope from American Apathy
- "Life", by E-Type featuring Na Na from Euro IV Ever
- "The Life", by Estelle from All of Me
- "Life", by Flipper from Album – Generic Flipper
- "The Life", by Gary Clark Jr. from Blak and Blu
- "The Life", by Hinder from All American Nightmare
- "The Life", by Mystic from Cuts for Luck and Scars for Freedom
- "LIFE", a single by Neuro-sama
- "Life", by Royce da 5'9" featuring Amerie on Royce da 5'9" from Rock City
- "Life", by Sonata Arctica from The Ninth Hour
- "Life", by Tory Lanez from Daystar
- "Life?", by Napalm Death from Scum
- "L.I.F.E.", by Lil Mama from VYP (Voice of the Young People)

==== Other uses in music ====
- Life (rapper), British hip hop musician
- Life Records, a Malaysian record label
- Life Records, an imprint of Bellmark Records
- The Life (musical), 1990
- Life (Tchaikovsky's unfinished symphony)

=== Literature ===
==== Fiction ====
- Life (play), an 1800 comedy play by Frederick Reynolds
- A Life, the English title of the 1892 novel Una Vita by Italo Svevo
- A Life (play), 1979, by Hugh Leonard
- A Life, a 1986 collection of poetry by Iain Crichton Smith
- Life (manga), a 2002 manga series by Keiko Suenobu
- Life, a 2004 novel by Gwyneth Jones
- The Life (novel), 2011, by Malcolm Knox
- The Life, a 2012 novel by Martina Cole
- A Life, a 2016 play by Adam Bock

==== Non-fiction books ====
- Life (Sadava book), a 1983 biological science textbook, in its 11th edition as of 2016
- A Life, the 1988 autobiography of Elia Kazan
- Life: A Natural History of the First Four Billion Years of Life on Earth, a 1997 natural history by Richard Fortey
- A Life, a 2001 memoir of Gabriel Josipovici's mother
- Life (Richards book), a 2010 memoir by The Rolling Stones guitarist Keith Richards

==== Non-fiction periodicals ====
- Life (magazine), an American magazine from 1883 to 1972 and from 1978 to 2000
- Life (newspapers), local papers from Lerner Newspapers
- Life (journal), a scientific journal published by MDPI
- IUBMB Life, a scientific journal published by the International Union of Biochemistry and Molecular Biology

=== Radio ===
- The Life, an Australian radio programme hosted by the comedy duo Roy and HG
- Life 103.1, the slogan for WLHC, an American radio station licensed to Robbins, North Carolina, US
- Life FM (disambiguation), one of several radio stations
- Life Radio, a Philippine radio network

=== Television ===
==== Series ====
- Life (American TV series), a 2007–2009 American police drama aired on NBC
- Life (2009 TV series), a British nature documentary series aired on the BBC
- Life (2020 TV series), a British drama series aired on the BBC
- Life (Japanese TV series), a 2007 Japanese television series, based on the manga series of the same name
- Life (South Korean TV series), a 2018 South Korean television series
- The Life Collection, David Attenborough's series of BBC natural history programmes from 1979 to 2005

==== Channels and broadcasters ====
- Life TV (Philippines), a Philippine television channel
- GMA Life TV, an international Filipino television station
- 9Life, an Australian television channel sometimes called Life
- Life Network, rebranded as Slice in 2007, a former Canadian television specialty network
- Life TV Media, a British broadcasting company
- TV3 Life, a Latvian television channel

==== Other uses in television ====
- "Life" (Stargate: Universe), an episode of Stargate: Universe
- The Life (advertisement), a 2009 television and cinema advertisement for the Halo 3: ODST video game

=== Other arts ===
- Life (sculpture), 1968, in Halifax, Nova Scotia, Canada

== Businesses and organizations ==
- Life (news agency, Russia), Russian news website
- Life Racing Engines, a former racing team
- Life Technologies (Thermo Fisher Scientific), a corporation acquired by Thermo Fisher Scientific in 2014
- Life University, a college in Marietta, Georgia, US
- lifecell, a Ukraine mobile network operator, formerly called life:)
- Lambda Phi Epsilon, a North American Asian-interest fraternity nicknamed Life
- The LIFE Programme (French : L’Instrument Financier pour l’Environnement), the European Union's funding instrument for the environment and climate action
- Life Scout (Boy Scouts of America), the second-highest rank attainable in the Boy Scouts of America

== Technology ==
- Laser Inertial Fusion Energy, a laser inertial fusion power plant design
- Lunar Infrastructure for Exploration, a space telescope project
- Living Interplanetary Flight Experiment, Shuttle-LIFE and Phobos-LIFE
- Large Interferometer For Exoplanets

== Other uses ==
- Life (cereal), distributed by the Quaker Oats Company
- Life, Tennessee, an unincorporated community in the US
- Living Is For Everyone, a suicide prevention initiative of the Australian government's National Suicide Prevention Strategy
- LIFE Act, a 2000 US immigration law
- LYF (pronounced life), or Reliance LYF, a 4G smartphone brand owned by Reliance Industries

== See also ==
- Life on Earth (disambiguation)
- Life skills, human abilities to deal effectively with the demands and challenges of life
- Life, the universe and everything (disambiguation)
- My Life (disambiguation)
- Meaning of life
- Phenomenological life, life considered from a philosophical and rigorously phenomenological point of view
- Creature (disambiguation)
- Organism, a living entity
- Real life, a phrase used to distinguish between actual and fictional or idealized worlds
- List of life forms
- 一生 (disambiguation)
