= 人生 =

人生, meaning life, may refer to:

- In Life (IN生, 인생), a reissue edition of the album Go Live by South Korean boy group Stray Kids
- Jinsei, a Japanese light novel
- Life (1984 film), a Chinese drama film

== See also ==
- Human life (disambiguation)
- Life (disambiguation)
- My Life (disambiguation)
- Vita (disambiguation)
- 一生 (disambiguation)
- 一生一世 (disambiguation)
