= Creature =

Creature often refers to:

- An animal, monster, alien, or beast

Creature(s) or The Creature(s) may also refer to:

== Film and television ==
- Creature (1985 film), a 1985 science fiction film by William Malone
- Creature (miniseries), a 1998 TV movie about an amphibious shark-like monster
- Creature (1999 film), a 1999 documentary by Parris Patton
- Alien Lockdown, a 2004 television film that was shown under the title Creature via Sci-Fi Channel in UK
- Creature (2011 film), a 2011 horror film
- Creature 3D, a 2014 Hindi film directed by Vikram Bhatt
- The Creature (film), a 1924 German silent film
- La criatura, a 1977 Spanish film also known as "The Creature"
- "Creatures", a Series C episode of the television series QI (2005)

== Literature ==
- Creature, a 1989 novel by John Saul
- Creature, a 1997 novel by Peter Benchley, a reissue of the 1994 novel White Shark
- Creature!, a 2010 manga series by Shingo Honda

== Music ==
- Creature (band), a Canadian band
- Creature (musician) (born 1973), New York rapper
- Creature (Moist album), 1996
- Creature (Within the Ruins album), 2009
- Creatures (Motionless in White album), 2010
- Creatures (Elf Power album), 2002
- Creatures (Jolie Laide album), 2025
- The Creatures, a British duo formed in 1981
- The Creatures (Australian band), 1960s
- The Creatures, late 1980s group, pre-The Original Sins
- "Creature" (Jelly Roll song), 2020
- "Creature" (KSI song), 2017
- "Creatures (For a While)", a song by the band 311
- "Creature", a song by Asking Alexandria from the album From Death to Destiny
- "Creature", a song by Atreyu from the album A Death-Grip On Yesterday
- "Creature", a song by the Cat Empire from the album Rising with the Sun
- "Creature", a song by Joe Morris from the album Singularity
- "Creature", a song by Lost Society from the album If the Sky Came Down
- "Creature", a song by Luminous from the album Luminous in Wonderland
- "Creature", a song by Pop Smoke featuring Swae Lee from the album Shoot for the Stars, Aim for the Moon
- "Creatures", a song by Delain from the album Apocalypse & Chill

== Organizations ==
- Creatures Inc., a Japanese video game developer

== Video games ==
- Creatures (video game series), a series of artificial life simulation video games
  - Creatures (1996 video game), the first title in the series
- Creatures (1990 video game), a 1990 Commodore 64 game

== Other uses ==
- Legendary creature, a type of supernatural entity that is described in folklore
- Creature of statute, a legal entity, such as a corporation, created by statute
- Creature, a character from the reality show Who Wants to Be a Superhero?
- Gill-man or The Creature, the title character from the 1954 science-fiction horror film Creature from the Black Lagoon
- Organism, a biological creature

== See also ==
- Kreacher
- Life
- Life form
