= In but not of =

Term in New Jersey law

"In but not of" or "In, but not of" is a term used in New Jersey statutory law.

== Legal background ==
Article V, section IV, paragraph 1, of the Constitution of New Jersey, adopted in 1947, states:

All executive and administrative offices, departments, and instrumentalities of the State government, including the offices of Secretary of State and Attorney General, and their respective functions, powers and duties, shall be allocated by law among and within not more than twenty principal departments, in such manner as to group the same according to major purposes so far as practicable. Temporary commissions for special purposes may, however, be established by law and such commissions need not be allocated within a principal department.

This means that, unlike the US federal government, New Jersey does not allow for the creation of independent agencies of the Executive branch that exist outside of a Cabinet department. To get around this restriction (without having to amend the State Constitution), the New Jersey Legislature coined the term in but not of as a legal fiction. The statute creating an agency will state that the agency is nominally organized in but not of a Cabinet department, but the Cabinet department head has no oversight authority over the agency. In effect, the agency reports directly to the Governor of New Jersey.

== Examples ==
- Amistad Commission, in but not of New Jersey Department of Education
- New Jersey Cannabis Regulatory Commission, in but not of New Jersey Department of the Treasury
- Council on Affordable Housing, in but not of New Jersey Department of Community Affairs
