= Cannabis in New Jersey =

New Jersey's Cannabis Universal Symbol

Cannabis in New Jersey is legal for both medical use and recreational use. An amendment to the state constitution legalizing cannabis became effective on January 1, 2021, and enabling legislation and related bills were signed into law by governor Phil Murphy on February 22, 2021.

The state legislature tried to legalize cannabis during its 2018-19 session, but was unsuccessful. Instead, the legislature placed the issue before the voters as a referendum on the 2020 ballot. Known as New Jersey Public Question 1, the referendum passed with 67% approval. As a follow-up to passage of Question 1, in December 2020 the legislature passed legislation creating a recreational marketplace.

Disagreements between the governor and legislature over the lack of underage penalties in the legislation decriminalizing cannabis led to the effective date of cannabis legalization being delayed from January 1 until February 22, and police continued to arrest residents for marijuana offenses regularly during that time period. On April 21, 2022, licensed sales of recreational cannabis began.

== History ==
=== Criminalization ===
In 2013, New Jersey police made 24,765 arrests for possession of small amounts of marijuana, the highest in two decades. The number of 2013 arrests was double that of 1993, when the state's population was smaller. The spike in arrest rates was at odds with the national trend, beginning in 2007, that saw a decline in arrests for marijuana possession. New Jersey arrested 34,500 people on cannabis offenses in 2017, more than any other state in the nation.

=== Cannabis reform advocacy ===
New Jersey United for Marijuana Reform is an advocacy coalition of "religious, civil rights, law enforcement and medical leaders" who support legalization of marijuana in the state.

A report by New Jersey United for Marijuana Reform and New Jersey Policy Perspective, issued in 2016, concluded that if New Jersey legalized marijuana, it could generate about $300 million annually in sales tax revenue for the state. (The report assumed a sales tax of 25% and annual in-state marijuana sales of $1.2 billion.)

Perennial candidate Ed Forchion – known as "NJ Weedman" – has been described by NJ.com as "one of New Jersey's best known marijuana legalization advocates." Since the 1990s, Forchion has advocated for marijuana-law reform in the state. In 2004, Forchion lost a bid to legally change his name to "NJ Weedman" after prosecutors intervened. Forchion has been convicted of violating New Jersey's marijuana laws several times; in 2015, the New Jersey Superior Court, Appellate Division, affirmed one of his convictions, rejecting Forchion's contention that the criminalization of marijuana violated his constitutional rights under the state and federal constitutions.

=== Public opinion ===
Early public opinion polls has found that New Jersey voters were split on the issue of legalization, with proponents having a slight edge. In 2015, Rutgers Eagleton Institute of Politics conducted a public opinion poll of New Jerseyans, asking whether they supported legalizing, taxing, and regulating the use of marijuana. Among respondents, 33% "strongly supported" the idea, 26% "somewhat supported" the idea, 12% "somewhat opposed" the idea, and 27% "strongly opposed" the idea. A Reuters-Eagleton poll in 2018 showed similar results, with 58% supporting and 37% opposing the complete legalization of "the possession and personal use of recreational marijuana."

Public opinion on cannabis in New Jersey has shifted over the years, showing an increase of support for legalization efforts as they became more prominent. By 2020, when the statewide referendum was soon to come, support had grown significantly. A Monmouth University poll conducted in 2020 reported that 62% of registered voters supported legalization. Years after the vote was concluded and the legalization was passed, a 2023 Rutgers showed that 63% of voters in New Jersey supported the new law.

== Types of legal cannabis ==
The legalization of cannabis typically falls into two sets of laws and regulations: the legalization of cannabis for medical purposes, and the legalization for recreational use.

=== Medical use ===
On January 18, 2010, outgoing governor Jon Corzine signed a number of bills into law on his last day in office, including S. 119, the Compassionate Use Medical Marijuana Act, permitting the use of medical cannabis for persons with listed conditions: cancer, glaucoma, multiple sclerosis, HIV/AIDS, seizure disorder, Lou Gehrig's disease, severe muscle spasms, muscular dystrophy, inflammatory bowel disease, Crohn's disease and any terminal illness (defined as an illness for which a physician certifies that the patient will die within one year). The law allows the New Jersey health department to create rules to add other illnesses to the list. The law did not allow patients to grow their own marijuana; instead, the plant must be acquired through "alternate treatment centers" licensed by the state. Caregivers for patients are permitted to collect marijuana on behalf of the patient, but the caregiver must be designated and cleared by a criminal background check.

Enrollment in the medical marijuana program was initially small, which was attributed to costs, the rigid limitations of the program, and "the small number of doctors willing to recommend patients," as well as resistance to the program by New Jersey Governor Chris Christie, who in 2014 called the medical program a "front for legalization" of marijuana. In 2011, New Jersey was described as having the strictest medical marijuana law among the 16 states that at the time permitted medical marijuana.

The medical marijuana program, now officially known as New Jersey's Medicinal Cannabis Program, allows patients who are registered to access cannabis-based treatments with licensed healthcare practitioners and state-regulated dispensaries. The program was formed under CUMMA (the Compassionate Use Medical Marijuana Act) and developed by the Jake Honig Compassionate Use Medical Cannabis Act. Patients are able to receive cannabis prescriptions of up to 84 grams every 30 days which can be filled at Alternative Treatment Centers (ATCs) or certified dispensaries.

In 2013, the parents of a two-year-old with Dravet syndrome confronted Christie, who signed a bill allowing access for sick children to medical marijuana in what was later dubbed the "pot for tots" controversy.

As of 2015, 5,540 patients were registered as part of the program, along with 355 caregivers authorized to buy on behalf of ill patients. As of 2017, there were 11,659 qualified patients in the state, mostly adults.

Under New Jersey's medical-marijuana law, up to a maximum of six alternate treatment centers receive contracts from the state. These centers, which must be nonprofit, have the exclusive right to produce and sell medical marijuana in New Jersey. The first dispensary opened in December 2012 in Montclair. By October 2015, four additional centers had opened, in Egg Harbor Township, Woodbridge, Bellmawr, and Cranbury. In July 2017, the state issued a sixth and final permit, to the non-profit Harmony Foundation, allowing it to cultivate marijuana in Secaucus; after receiving an additional permit, Harmony opened a dispensary in Secaucus in June 2018.

Christie generally opposed efforts by advocates and legislators to add new illnesses to the list of qualifying conditions, but nevertheless in 2016 Christie signed into law a measure, sponsored by state Senator Joseph Vitale, that added post-traumatic stress disorder to the list of disorders making a patient eligible for the program.

In 2017, the state Medicinal Marijuana Review Panel, in a 5–1 vote, recommended that a number of conditions be added to the list of medical marijuana-qualifying conditions in New Jersey, including migraines, Tourette syndrome, autism-related anxiety, and Alzheimer's disease-related anxiety, as well as chronic pain if "related to a broad range of ailments, including opioid use disorder, arthritis, back and neck pain, sciatica, diabetes, surgeries, injuries, neuropathy, Lyme disease, lupus, fibromyalgia, irritable bowel syndrome, pancreatitis, and others." However, the Review Panel rejected proposals to add asthma and chronic fatigue to the list. The final determination on additions to the list is made by the state Health Commissioner.

In 2018, the Legislature considered a bill to expand access to medical marijuana (S-10), edible forms of marijuana would be legalized for adult medical use; patients enrolled in New Jersey's medical marijuana program could possess up to 3 ounces (85 g) (an increase from two ounces); and the permitting process for medical marijuana dispensaries, manufacturers, and cultivators would be expedited. The bill would have allowed physician assistants and advanced practice registered nurses to prescribe medical marijuana to patients.

Ultimately, a separate medical marijuana expansion measure, the Jake Honig Compassionate Use Medical Cannabis Act, passed the legislature and was signed into law by Governor Phil Murphy in July 2019. The legislation greatly expanded the number of slots for medical cannabis providers; created a Cannabis Regulatory Commission, which took over supervision of the medical cannabis program from the state Health Department; made it easier to patients to obtain medical cannabis by reducing the required frequency of medical eligibility verifications from four times a year to once a year; allowed patients to purchase more cannabis at any given point (increasing the limit from 2 ounces (57 g) to 3 oz (85 g) for 18 months, with limitations to be thereafter determined by the Cannabis Regulatory Commission, and with no limit for terminally ill patients); authorized nursing homes and hospice centers to obtain cannabis from dispensaries on behalf of patients; and allowed medical cannabis patients from outside New Jersey to buy medicine while visiting New Jersey for up to six months. The legislation and subsequent amendments also phased out the state sales tax levied on purchases of medical cannabis by registered patients at dispensaries, while allowing municipalities to levy a local transfer tax of up to 2%, which no municipality has chosen to do.

Beginning July 1, 2022, the sales tax on medical cannabis products purchased at licensed dispensaries was fully repealed. A law signed in 2019 contained a provision that phased out the sales tax for cannabis products.

=== Recreational use ===
The state’s Cannabis Regulatory Commission held a meeting in April 2022, after being pushed by the legislature, in order to work through a backlog of applications. The commission approved seven businesses to begin to sell cannabis recreationally. Critics noted that the applications had been waiting for a while, as the state’s voters approved medical cannabis nearly two years prior to the approval in April. The seven businesses granted licenses by the commission were already in the medical cannabis business, known as "alternative treatment centers." Financial Regulation News noted that the state board still had a lot of work ahead of it, as they need to approve more companies to sell cannabis to meet what the state's expected demand.

In April 2022, licensed recreational sales of cannabis began in New Jersey. Dispensaries began selling recreational cannabis on April 21, 2022.

As of April 2022, the 13 dispensaries are located in Maplewood, Phillipsburg, Rochelle Park, Bloomfield, Paterson, Elizabeth, Lawrence Township, Egg Harbor Township, Williamstown, Deptford, Vineland, Bellmawr, and Edgewater Park.

Under New Jersey state law, consumers are legally allowed to purchase up to one ounce (28 g) of dried flower; 5 grams of concentrates, resins, and oils; and up to 1 gram total of edible cannabis products.

Consumers must be 21 years of age or older to purchase legal cannabis.

The rollout of the state's recreational cannabis program hasn't been without criticism. Industry stakeholders, including owners of cannabis companies belonging to minority groups, have complained about the state’s system for evaluating applications for licenses, calling the system unreliable and unfair. One of the companies, Pangea, said that the state’s method was overly complicated. For example, Pangea said that its application was reviewed by six people from various government departments and used a system with 1,000 possible points across 60 different measures.

== 2017-2019 legislative debate on legalization ==
In May 2017, state Senator Nicholas Scutari, a Democrat from Union, introduced legislation to legalize marijuana in New Jersey for recreational purposes. Under Scutari's proposal, adults aged 21 and over in the state would be able to legally consume marijuana and to legally possess up to one ounce (28 g) of marijuana flower, plus 16 ounces (450 g) of solid cannabis-infused products (i.e., edibles); 72 US fluid ounces (2.1 L) of "liquid marijuana tinctures, drinks and oils," and seven grams of marijuana concentrate. A state sales tax on marijuana products would go from 7% in the first year to 10% in the second year, progressively rising by 5% per year until the tax level reached 25%. "Unlike all of the eight states that already host recreational marijuana programs, New Jersey would not allow home cultivation." Christie strongly opposed any legalization of marijuana, calling the legislation "beyond stupidity" and "nothing more than crazy liberals who want to say everything's OK," and said that he would veto any legalization bill.

In 2018, after Christie left office, the Democratic-controlled state legislature again considered the Scutari legalization bill. However "at least 15 competing marijuana bills, each with a different flavor and vision, have been proposed in the Assembly." Current governor Phil Murphy supports legalization, and vowed to sign a legalization bill in a bid to raise $1.3 billion in revenue. and fulfill a campaign pledge to sign a legalization bill within the first 100 days of his administration.

Scutari introduced new legislation to legalize, regulate, and tax marijuana for recreational purposes, the New Jersey Marijuana Legalization Act, on June 7, 2018. Stephen M. Sweeney is a consponsor. In November 2018, a joint panel of the New Jersey Legislature (composed of assembly members and senators) passed S-2703, as well as separate legislation to expand the state's expungement process, including for drug offenses (S-3205). Under S-2703, the possession of up to one ounce (28 g) of marijuana, and the consumption of marijuana in the home or designated areas would become legal; a 12% state sales tax on marijuana would be imposed; and New Jersey municipalities would be given the power to choose to levy an additional 2% tax.

The progress of the legalization bill was slowed by legislative gridlock. Governor Murphy and Senate President Sweeney agreed that marijuana should be legalized, but disagree on details. A small number of state Senate Democrats opposed legalization, most vocally "a handful of African-American Democratic lawmakers who split with their party over legalization, arguing that it would be a public health menace to their communities." Senator Ronald Rice was a leading opponent of legalization. As a result of their opposition, the proponents of the legislation needed every other Senate Democrat, and possibly several Senate Republicans, in order to secure passage.

Negotiations in December 2018 and January 2019 focused on the tax rate for marijuana sales and regulatory oversight. In March 2019, the effort to legalize marijuana in New Jersey collapsed, as Murphy and Sweeney were unable to persuade a majority of senators to back the legislation.

=== Local restrictions ===
Although a legalization bill did not pass the state legislature in 2018, a number of municipal governments in New Jersey nevertheless enacted legislation in anticipation of legalization that would ban or restrict marijuana sales and use within those municipalities, including Freehold Township, Oceanport, Cinnaminson Township, Hazlet, Middletown Township, Brick, and Toms River. Freehold, for example, banned the sale of all marijuana (recreational or medical), while Oakland banned "retail stores, cultivation facilities, manufacturing, testing, social clubs, cultivation, possession, storing, testing, labeling, transport, delivery, dispensing and distribution" but exempted medical marijuana dispensaries and use.

== 2020 referendum on recreational use ==
After the collapse of the 2018-19 efforts to legalize marijuana through the legislature, legislative leaders announced plans to place a marijuana referendum on the 2020 ballot. In New Jersey, a referendum can be placed on the ballot when the legislature votes to do so by a simple majority in two consecutive years, or a supermajority (60% in both houses) in one year. On December 16, 2019, the bill was passed in both houses with a supermajority, which put the referendum on the 2020 ballot. It passed in the Assembly by a vote of 49–24 (with one abstention) and in the Senate by a vote of 24–16.

On November 3, 2020, New Jersey voters approved New Jersey Public Question 1, an amendment to the state constitution to legalize the recreational use of cannabis by people ages 21 and older, with 67% voting yes and 33% voting no. The amendment provides for the state to establish a regulated market for the cultivation, distribution, and sale of cannabis.

=== 2020 and 2021 legislation ===
NJ A21 (20R), a legalization and regulation bill, and NJ A1897 (20R), decriminalization, were sent to New Jersey governor Phil Murphy on December 17. Murphy said he would conditionally veto the bills if language on underage possession was not reconciled by January 30. An initial attempt at negotiations on a "clean-up bill" to address underage penalties collapsed due to strong opposition from the Black and Latino caucuses in the legislature, who opposed the legislation on the grounds that police would use the penalties to unfairly target minorities. To address these concerns, the final bill that was passed saw fines for people aged 18–20 caught with marijuana reduced to $50 (from the original $500 maximum fine) and "stationhouse adjustments" for minors replaced with written warnings from police.

On January 29, New Jersey A5342 was introduced in committee to address underage penalties in the legalization and decriminalization bills; this marked the second attempt at a clean-up bill. Clean-up bill S3454 was introduced on February 11 after the governor's veto threat and was approved by Senate Judiciary Committee at February 19 hearing, passed 22-12 by the Senate and 49-27 by the Assembly in a February 22 vote and was signed into law by the governor later the same day, along with the decriminalization and legalization bills.

=== Clean-up bill controversy and amendment ===
After the underage penalties bill was signed into law alongside the enabling legislation, police organizations and some lawmakers objected to a provision that prohibits police from informing the parents of minors about their child's first alcohol or cannabis possession offense. Under the law, police could only inform the parent or guardian of a person under 18's alcohol or cannabis possession upon their second offense. In response, legislators began working on a revision to the underage penalties statute that would allow police to notify a parent or guardian after a first possession offense. Governor Murphy expressed support for the legislation.

On March 25, 2021, both houses of the New Jersey Legislature unanimously passed an amendment to the underage penalties law requiring police to notify the parent or guardian of a minor about any alcohol or marijuana possession offenses. Murphy signed the legislation into law the following day.

== Current regulation ==
On August 19, 2021, the Cannabis Regulatory Commission (CRC) established the first set of rules and regulations regarding the recreational cannabis industry, as well as beginning the process of handing out licenses to businesses. The new rules covered several categories ranging from personal possession to business regulations.

=== Personal consumption ===
The following rules govern personal consumption of recreational cannabis in New Jersey:

- Consumers at least 21 or older may purchase up to one ounce (28 g) of cannabis and possess up to six ounces (170 g) of cannabis, or an equivalent amount of cannabis products.
- Driving under the influence is prohibited.
- It is illegal for anyone under 21 to purchase, possess, or consume cannabis products.
- People and entities engaged in activities authorized by the statute and rules are protected from criminal prosecution.
- Home cultivation is prohibited.

=== Equity ===
New Jersey’s cannabis legalization law includes measures to promote social equity. It gives priority in licensing to applicants from economically disadvantaged areas and to individuals with prior cannabis-related convictions. At least 25% of licenses are reserved for social equity applicants. In addition, 70% of cannabis tax revenue is directed to community reinvestment programs in areas most affected by prohibition, supporting social services, economic development, and public health initiatives.

The new rules established three types of cannabis businesses that will receive priority review and approval in application processes:

- Social equity businesses - owned by those who live in economically disadvantaged areas, which are defined as zip codes whose average median household income is less than 80% of the state average, has a health uninsured rates that is at least 150% of the state rate, and has a poverty rate at least 150% of the statewide rate; or those who have had a previous conviction for a cannabis offense.
- Diversely owned businesses - minority-owned, woman-owned, disabled veteran-owned, or any combination of the three.
- Impact zone businesses - owned by those located in impact zones, which are defined as municipalities with a large population, high unemployment rate, or high numbers of crime or arrests for marijuana. The new rules set the age to 21 to participate in cannabis businesses.

The CRC also established a Social Equity Excise Fee, which is a fee on cultivation that is supposed to increase as consumer prices decrease, whose funds will go toward educational support, economic development, and social support services in Impact Zones.

The bill also prioritizes small businesses, referred to as "microbusiness", as a way to allow greater integration from underrepresented communities into the cannabis industry. A microbusiness is defined as a store limited to 10 employees and 2,500 square feet.

=== Municipality authority ===
The bill codifies the ordinances that municipalities are able to pass.

- Authorize certain types of cannabis businesses.
- Set numerical limits to the number of types of businesses operating within their jurisdiction.
- Restrict hours of operation and locations of cannabis businesses, such as banning locations near school zones or places of worship.
- Create local licensing requirements and penalties.
- Restricting type of cultivation allowed.
- Establish a 2% transfer tax on cannabis products transferred within their jurisdiction.
- Communicate the municipality's preference for licensure to the Commission.

However, municipalities are not allowed to pass certain ordinances, such as restriction of cannabis delivery services or transportation.

==== Municipal banning of marijuana shops ====
Around 71% (roughly 400) of New Jersey municipalities have already declined or banned the opening of cannabis businesses within their jurisdictions. Municipalities were given until August 22 to determine if they wanted to "opt in" to cannabis businesses or "opt out", as municipalities who opt in are not allowed to opt out for a set number of years, while those who have opted out are allowed to reverse their decision at any point. Not all municipalities have opted out for political reasons, some want to hold off a bit before they allow marijuana businesses in their jurisdictions, such as Camden or Princeton.

=== Business regulations ===
==== Safety ====
People must be at least 21 to participate in the cannabis industry. Advertising must be restricted to primarily those of legal age, with TV and radio ads only being allowed between 10PM and 6AM, as well as banning the promotion of overconsumption or making unproven claims. Businesses are required to mask odors and partake in local community discussion, and must have at least one staff member who can respond to any complaints from locals.

Within cannabis retail stores, employees are required to have educational materials for customers, which would include things such as the health effects of cannabis use, harm reduction, and indications of abuse. Products are required to be properly labeled with a list of health risks and a hotline to poison control. Packaging that might be appealing to children, such as the use of cartoons, candy, food, and trademarked images, are prohibited. Packaging must also be childproof. Edibles are only permitted in a few certain forms: syrups, pills, tablets, capsules, and chewable forms, while products resembling food like cookies or brownies are prohibited.

==== Licensing ====
There are no limits on licenses, with the exception of the retention of the 2 year cap on cultivator licenses at 37, which expires on February 22, 2023. Social Equity Businesses, Diversely-Owned Businesses, and Impact Zone Businesses are prioritized for licensing approval, regardless of when they submit applications. The bill also works to prevent predatory lending, regulating the framework of management services and financial services. There are several types of licenses with different requirements:

- Conditional licenses - Applicants are required to submit background information, a criminal background check, and must prove they make less than $200,000 annually ($400,000 for joint filers). If approved, applicants must then solidify a spot for their business, gain control of the property, and gain municipal approval. Once ready, license-holders must then submit things such as operating procedures for the business, an environmental impact plan, a workforce development plan, and a security plan.
- Annual licenses - Applicants are required to submit a more detailed application that includes details for the proposed site for the business, which must be owned or leased, municipal approval, zoning approval; and they must also submit an operating summary plan in which applicants detail their experience, history, and knowledge of critical pieces of operating a cannabis business. Microbusinesses are allowed to apply to convert to an annual license, as long as they have been established for at least one year.
- Expanded alternative treatment centers - Treatment centers will be able to expand their operations to include personal use cannabis subject to municipal approval. They must certify they have an adequate supply for patients, and the use of sales will not impact patient access.

Application fees are set at a low price to reduce barriers to entry, only applicants who are approved pay the full price for applying, paying only 20% of the fee at the time of application, and only paying the remaining 80% should they be approved, with applications starting as low as $100, with those who are approved having to pay between $500-$2,000. Annual license fees are connected to size, with microbusinesses paying as little as $1,000 per year, cultivators with a canopy of 150,000 sq feet paying $50,000 per year, and Alternative Treatment Centers will be required to pay a conversion fee of $300,000 - $1,000,000, depending on their size.

Cannabis business employees are required to register with the CRC and pay an annual $25 fee for a Cannabis Business ID Card, with employees being required to undergo a training course.

Cultivators are determined by the size of the facility.

==== Product regulations ====
Cannabis manufacturing is restricted to secure, enclosed facilities. There is a ban on additives that are deemed harmful, as well as a restriction on percentages of how much additives are allowed. Terpenes are only allowed in vapes in concentrations found naturally. There is a restriction on what types of cannabis products are allowed to be produced:

- Cannabis concentrates including extracts and resins
- Vaporized formulations
- Drops, tinctures, and other sublabial and sublingual forms
- Oral lozenges and other buccal forms
- Edibles that can only be in the form of syrups, pills, tablets, capsules, and chewables
- Topical formulations and transdermal forms

Packaging and labeling must be childproof, have a universal warning symbol, have required warning labels, expiration dates, a summary of product testing results, list of ingredients used in cultivation or production, and serving size. Warning labels will include things such as avoiding use of heavy machinery, avoiding use while pregnant or breastfeeding, and noting that high-potency products may affect mental health. Cannabis flower must include potency testing results, indicate if it is high-, moderate-, or low-THC, and whether it is high-, moderate-, or low-CBD. Labels must not have any false information or advertising on it. Labels must not be appealing to children whatsoever.

Regulators must pick a date for sales at least 180 days in advance.

== "Gifting" loophole ==
In New Jersey, there is a legal loophole referred to as "gifting". When "gifting" occurs, a company sells a negligible product (like a box of cookies) to a customer at an astronomical price, such as $50. Then when the company delivers the product it offers a "free gift" of cannabis as a thank-you for the purchase of the cookies. This scheme was believed to have started in Washington, DC after it legalized cannabis but didn't yet have any licensed dispensaries set up yet.

The gifting loophole undermines the regulatory framework that governs the sale and possession of cannabis in the state. The few license holders that do exist in New Jersey have paid hundreds of thousands or even millions of dollars to the license to cultivate and sell cannabis. In June 2021, the New Jersey Attorney General sent warning letters to companies taking advantage of the gifting loophole. Four companies were specifically targeted for the cease and desist letters for committing gifting: Four Sky High Munchies, Slumped Kitchen LLC, NJGreenDirect.com LLC and West Winds Wellness. At least one gifting company, Bud Hub, was shut down by Ocean County Police. In October 2021, the owner was charged with possession, possession with intent to distribute, distribution of marijuana, and second-degree money laundering. Police also seized marijuana, paraphernalia, his Bud hub branded Jeep, and over $400,000 in cash. Budhub was openly operating out of Holiday City.

== Cannabis media in New Jersey ==
Cannabis news is an important and hot topic in New Jersey. Independent media organizations such as Heady NJ and mainstream outlet NJ Cannabis Insider are two of the leading cannabis sites in New Jersey. Both websites were founded in 2017 when cannabis was expected to be legalized by Gov. Phil Murphy.

== Effective date ==
On April 21, 2022, New Jersey cannabis sales legislation went into effect after the passage of the November 2020 ballot initiative. Nearly $2 million of cannabis was sold on the first day.

== 2024 market totals and growth rate ==
New Jersey cannabis sales exceeded $1 billion in 2024, about 25% more than in 2023. The state Cannabis Regulatory Commission (CRC) reported that adult-use sales generated over $50 million in tax revenue that year.

== See also ==
- Jake's Law
- New Jersey Cannabis Regulatory Commission
- New Jersey Department of Health
