= AP Biology =

Advanced Placement course and exam

Logo of AP Bio as of 2025

Advanced Placement (AP) Biology (also known as AP Bio) is an Advanced Placement biology course and exam offered by the College Board in the United States. For the 2012–2013 school year, the College Board unveiled a new curriculum with a greater focus on "scientific practices."

This course is designed for students who wish to pursue an interest in the life sciences. The College Board recommends successful completion of high school biology and high school chemistry before commencing AP Biology, although the actual prerequisites vary from school to school and from state to state.

== Topic outline ==
The exam covers the following 8 units. The percentage indicates the portion of the multiple-choice section of the exam focused on each content area:

Topic	Percent
Chemistry of Life	8-11%
Cell Structure and Function	10-13%
Cellular Energetics (photosynthesis and cellular respiration)	12-16%
Cell Communication and Cell Cycle	10-15%
Heredity	8-11%
Gene Expression and Regulation	12-16%
Natural Selection	13-20%
Ecology	10-15%

The course is based on and tests six skills, called scientific practices which include:

Topic	Percent
Concept Explanation	8-11%
Visual Representations	10-13%
Question and Method	12-16%
Representing and Describing Data	10-15%
Statistical Tests and Data Analysis	8-11%
Argumentation	12-16%

In addition to the topics above, students are required to be familiar with general lab procedure. Students should know how to collect data, analyze data to form conclusions, and apply those conclusions.

== Exam ==
Students are allowed to use a four-function, scientific, or graphing calculator. The exam has two sections: a 90-minute multiple choice (MCQ) section and a 90-minute free response (FRQ) section.

The multiple choice portion of the test consists of 60 questions, each with four potential answers to be selected. Questions may focus on a short corresponding reading section, a graph or illustration of a biological feature, or might have no related passage or diagram following it. Unanswered questions are counted as incorrect, and there is no penalty for guessing.

The free response section consists of 2 long questions and 4 short ones. Each question is split into subsections a-d and will always be based on a passage of context or describing an experiment. The second long form question will always include a graphing portion and experimental design, while the first long form question consists of a typically scientifically relevant development in terms of biology concepts. Questions typically include identification, graphing, experimental design, data interpretation, justification, prediction, and scientific analysis.

=== Score distribution ===
Final score	1	2	3	4	5	% of scores 3 or higher	Mean score	Standard deviation	Number of students
2002	12.3%	23.2%	24.1%	22.9%	17.5%	64.6%	3.10	N/A	97,762
2003	14.9%	26.1%	22.4%	18.6%	17.9%	58.9%	2.98	N/A	103,944
2004	14.4%	24.6%	21.9%	20.2%	18.9%	61.0%	3.05	N/A	111,104
2005	15.5%	23.3%	22.9%	20.1%	18.2%	61.2%	3.02	N/A	121,446
2006	15.6%	23.3%	21.2%	20.3%	19.6%	61.1%	3.05	N/A	131,783
2007	15.9%	23.2%	21.2%	20.3%	19.3%	60.8%	3.04	N/A	144,796
2008	34.6%	15.2%	16.1%	15.6%	18.6%	50.3%	2.68	N/A	154,504
2009	34.0%	15.1%	15.8%	15.5%	19.5%	50.8%	2.71	N/A	159,580
2010	34.6%	14.1%	15.4%	15.1%	18.7%	49.2%	2.65	N/A	172,512
2011	34.8%	14.6%	15.2%	16.5%	18.8%	50.6%	2.70	N/A	184,497
2012	14.6%	14.6%	14.3%	16.9%	19.7%	51.0%	2.73	N/A	191,773
2013	7.40%	29.30%	36.20%	21.60%	5.50%	63.30%	2.88	1.01	203,189
2014	8.70%	27.10%	35.20%	22.40%	6.60%	64.20%	2.91	1.05	213,294
2015	8.20%	27.50%	35.90%	22.10%	6.40%	64.30%	2.91	1.03	223,479
2016	10.10%	28.80%	33.60%	21.00%	6.60%	61.10%	2.85	1.07	238,080
2017	8.40%	27.50%	36.70%	21.00%	6.40%	64.10%	2.90	1.03	254,270
2018	10.00%	28.50%	32.90%	21.50%	7.10%	61.50%	2.87	1.08	259,663
2019	8.80%	26.60%	35.30%	22.20%	7.20%	64.70%	2.93	1.06	260,816
2020	6.90%	24.10%	36.90%	22.70%	9.50%	69.10%	3.04	1.06	233,444
2021	10.80%	30.00%	32.40%	19.40%	7.40%	59.20%	2.83	1.09	230,527
2022	10.50%	21.60%	29.70%	23.10%	15.00%	67.90%	3.11	1.21	237,338
2023	12.00%	23.60%	27.20%	23.00%	14.30%	64.40%	3.04	1.23	239,470
2024	10.00%	21.70%	28.40%	23.10%	16.80%	68.30%	3.15	1.22	260,062
2025	8.60%	21.00%	27.40%	24.10%	18.90%	70.40%	3.24	1.22	287,232
2026	8.0%	21.0%	31.0%	25.0%	15.0%	71.0%			318,000

== Commonly used textbooks ==
- Biology, AP Edition by Sylvia Mader (2012, hardcover ISBN 0076620042)
- Life: The Science of Biology (Sadava, Heller, Bilal, Purves, and Hillis, ISBN 978-0-7167-7671-0)
- Campbell Biology AP Ninth Edition (Reece, Urry, Cain, Wasserman, Minorsky, and Andrew Jackson ISBN 978-0131375048)

== See also ==
- Glossary of biology
- A.P Bio (TV Show)
