= 2018 United States adenovirus outbreak =

Disease outbreak in the United States

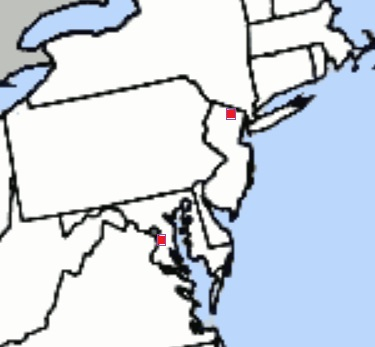
- Map showing the two outbreak locations, in Maryland and New Jersey
- Date: October 2018 to December 2018
- Duration: Three months
- Location: Maryland, New Jersey
- Type: Adenovirus outbreak
- Cause: Unknown
- Deaths: 12
- Injuries: 70+

The 2018 United States adenovirus outbreak was an occurrence in which an unusual number of adenovirus cases were reported at two locations, one in Maryland and one in New Jersey, from September to December 2018, resulting in deaths in both states. At least 35 people contracted the disease in each location of the outbreak. In New Jersey, the ill ranged in age from toddlers to adults, and eleven children died. It was "one of the nation's deadliest long-term-care outbreaks" and "one of the nation's worst recorded outbreaks of the [adeno]virus." The adenovirus outbreak led to the passage of new legislation in 2019 concerning the containment of outbreaks in long-term care centers in New Jersey.

== History ==
=== Sept. 2018: New Jersey outbreak ===
In September 2018, an adenovirus outbreak began at the Wanaque Center for Nursing and Rehabilitation, a care facility for those with short-term rehab or long-term needs in Wanaque, New Jersey. on September 26, 2018, when a child developed symptoms of a respiratory ailment in the pediatric ventilator unit, followed by a second child misdiagnosed as having respiratory ailments. At the time, Wanaque did not have enough space to isolate the ill children from others. The parents of ill patients were notified on October 19, 2018, and that day as well the NJ health department was notified of a "cluster of respiratory illnesses." Two children had died at that point while twenty overall had shown symptoms. On October 10, 2018, the state Health Department sent a communicable disease specialist to the center. The outbreak proved to be the type 7 adenovirus. Not typically dangerous, it can be deadly to vulnerable patients.

The commissioner of the New Jersey Department of Health was notified about the outbreak on October 19, when five children had died. The state sent inspectors on October 21 in a surprise inspection, concluding that the center had yet to "establish and maintain an infection prevention and control program." Six employees were observed inadequately washing their hands, continued in inspections on November 9, 11, and 13. Medicare inspections of the facility in 2016 and 2017 had also found "infection control issues."

On October 24, 2018, a government inspection report cited Wanaque for several deficiencies from 2015 to 2018. Elnahal, head of the state health department, asserted the issues had been corrected and that the state would permanently surveil the facility.

Reported on November 9, 2018, two anonymous employees spoke to NJ Advance Media and claimed that "senior administrators delayed sending kids to the hospital" to keep the pediatric unit as full as possible, maximizing funds amounting to $519.46 from Medicaid per patient per day. After the report, the state health commissioner sent inspectors to the facility. After November 12, 2018, the outbreak was reported under control.

=== Nov-Dec 2018: Wanaque aftermath ===
On November 14, the center was ordered by the state to isolate sick patients by November 21 and curtail all new admissions. By November 16, there were 43 children on the first-floor ventilator unit where the virus was spreading. 19 children were in a second-floor unaffected pediatric unit, with 125 adult patients in the facility. On November 19, 2018, it was reported that The Wanaque Center had separated its medically fragile patients from those with adenovirus symptoms. The dropping number of patients had allowed enough space to separate beds, whereas previously patients were being cared for in close proximity.

From October to November 2018, the virus infected 35 people at the Wanaque Center, including 23 children. Ultimately, 36 residents and one staff member were diagnosed with the adenovirus. The ill ranged in age from toddlers to teens, and eleven children died. It was "one of the nation's deadliest long-term-care outbreaks" and "one of the nation's worst recorded outbreaks of the [adeno]virus."

Over three visits in early November, state inspectors gave the Wanaque Center the worst rating possible, "immediate jeopardy." Federal inspectors also visited the center, from November 13 through 17, giving the center six "immediate jeopardy violations" for systemic deficiencies in care. Inspectors initially blamed poor hygiene for the outbreak. However, later, federal inspectors also implicated poor planning by management. A November 17 report by the New York office of the Centers for Medicare and Medicaid Services (CMS) blamed the outbreak on the center's response, particularly management for lack of planning and slow responses, leading to delays "in identifying, reporting and controlling the outbreak." The pediatric medical director, for example, was not informed what exactly his job was, and was not informed of the number of infected patients until after the fourth death. Wanaque Center strongly contested the findings, calling the report flawed and appealing the report to dispute "unfounded allegations." Several lawsuits concerning the outbreak were filed against the center in late 2018.

=== Nov-Dec 2018: University of Maryland outbreak ===
At the height of the outbreak in New Jersey, an outbreak of the same strain of the virus occurred among students at the University of Maryland, College Park. The college learned about the first case of adenovirus on November 1, and by mid-December, 35 cases involving the same strain of the virus had been reported at the university. Among those cases, 18-year old freshman Olivia Paregol, who was "immunosuppressed because of medication for Crohn's disease", died on November 18, 2018. In its coverage, the press noted that an adenovirus vaccine exists but not generally available to the public. It has been proposed that the Maryland outbreak was connected to a mold outbreak on the campus during the same period.

In January 2019, the University of Maryland began a weeks-long effort to have a contracted cleaning company disinfect all surfaces in the dorms where the outbreak occurred. The death of Paregol prompted Maryland Governor Larry Hogan to address the matter as "very concerning".

=== 2018-2019: New Jersey responses ===
On November 20, 2018, members of the New Jersey Legislature representing the affected district sent a letter to New Jersey Attorney General Gurbir Grewal requesting an investigation of claims that "the facility delayed sending children for treatment for non-medical reasons" relating to the collection of Medicaid payments.

A hearing on the outbreak was held by the NJ Senate Health Committee on December 3, 2018. At the hearing, the NJ health department head announced that state health policy had been changed as a result of the outbreak, requiring the health commissioner to be notified immediately when outbreaks result in the deaths of children.

In direct response to the Wanaque outbreak, a June 2019 report from the New Jersey Health Department called for new legislation that would require New Jersey's long-term care centers to submit outbreak response plans to the state. Other recommendations included quickly separating sick residents and designated staff, as well as quickly notifying guardians when outbreaks occur. The issue was included through $2.5 million in competitive grant funding by the proposed budget of New Jersey Governor Phil Murphy. The resultant state bill, A5527, was based on the report and faced no opposition when passing both houses of the state legislature in late June 2019. On August 15, 2019, Murphy cited the 11 dead children of the Wanaque Center outbreak when signing the bill into law. Among other regulations, A5527 requires certain long-term facilities to provide outbreak response plans to the state within 180 days of signing. Other new requirements involve promptly notifying residents, families, staff, and visitors of an outbreak. At the time the bill was signed, Wanaque remained under state and federal investigation for how it handled the outbreak.
