= North Jersey Pediatric and Adult Nursing and Wellness Center =

Geography
- Location: 1433 Ringwood Ave, Haskell, New Jersey, United States
- Coordinates: 41.014260°N 74.298436°W

Organization
- Type: For-profit

Links
- Website: www.wanaquerehab.com

The Phoenix Center for Rehabilitation and Pediatrics is a long-term care center and nursing home in Haskell, New Jersey. It is a for-profit center that provides treatment to children who are medically fragile or are receiving palliative care. As of October 2018, it had 92 pediatric long-term care beds and 135 for elderly residents, also operating as a long-term nursing home and a rehabilitation center. In July 2019, it was sold and renamed the North Jersey Pediatric and Adult Nursing and Wellness Center.

In late 2018, a severe adenovirus outbreak at the facility received international attention. Ultimately, 11 children died and 36 residents and one staff member were diagnosed in "one of the nation's deadliest long-term-care outbreaks."

== History ==
In 2014 it was purchased by Eugene Ehrenfeld and Daniel Bruckstein of Continuum Healthcare LLC. In December 2018, Eugene Ehrenfeld and David Bruckstein continued to own the facility. Wanaque Center, in July 2019, was renamed the North Jersey Pediatric and Adult Nursing and Wellness Center. It had been sold to new owners and was awaiting approval from the state for the transfer of its license.

=== 2018 adenovirus outbreak ===
Main topic: 2018 United States adenovirus outbreak

The 2018 United States adenovirus outbreak began at the Wanaque Center for Nursing and Rehabilitation.

The head of the New Jersey Department of Health was notified on October 19, when five children had died.

A hearing was held by the state Senate Health Committee on the Wanaque outbreak on December 3, 2018. Wanaque Center failed to send a representative, saying that it was protecting patient privacy and that the hearing was not the appropriate place to discuss the outbreak. Senator Richard Codey suggested that the Senate subpoena the Wanaque Center owners to attend if they refused in the future. At the hearing, the NJ health department head announced that state health policy had been changed as a result of the outbreak, requiring the health commissioner to be notified immediately when outbreaks result in the deaths of children.

=== 2019 investigations and bill ===
On March 2, 2019, Wanaque Center was fined $600,000 by the federal government based on state and federal inspections. Wanaque Center attorneys said they would contest the findings. On March 29, 2019, it was reported that the center could resume admitting pediatric ventilator patients after the state ban lifted. At the time, Senator Codey was calling for a criminal probe into the center, arguing the facility should not be operating.

In spring 2019, another respiratory virus outbreak, hMPV, infected three staff members and three patients at Wanaque. Wanaque followed new protocols, with no deaths.

In direct response to the Wanaque outbreak, on June 6, 2019, a New Jersey health department report called for a new law requiring long-term care facilities to develop disease outbreak plans. A new bill based on the report was signed by the governor in August 2019, after passing both houses of state legislature late June 2019. At the time the bill was signed, Wanague remained under state and federal investigation for how it handled the outbreak.

== Facility ==
By February 28, 2019, the center still had 92 beds for children and 135 for elderly residents. In June 2019, it was one of 11 New Jersey nursing homes flagged by federal inspectors for persistently unsafe conditions by the Centers for Medicare & Medicaid Services.

== See also ==
- 2018 United States adenovirus outbreak
