= Jake's Law =

New Jersey cannabis law reform

The Jake Honig Compassionate Use Medical Cannabis Act, nicknamed Jake's Law, was named after 7-year-old Jake Honig who died on January 21, 2018, in New Jersey from brain cancer. Jake's Law expanded the state's medical marijuana program and was based on Jake's story. It was signed into law by Governor Phil Murphy on July 2, 2019.

== Jake's story ==
Jake Honig was diagnosed with brain cancer when he was two years old. During the course of his disease, he lived through several rounds of remissions and relapses. He had two surgeries, 61 rounds of radiation and 20 rounds of chemotherapy. At one point, his parents tried giving him medical cannabis to ease his symptoms. They reported that his pain subsided, and he ate and drank and became more active.

During the last months of Jake's life, his family said that medical cannabis relieved some of his symptoms. However, the state had a limit of just 2 ounces (57 g) per month, and the family ran out. Once they ran out, they used morphine and OxyContin to ease his pain. After he died, the family led efforts to reform the medical marijuana program in the state.

Mike Honig, Jake's father, said, "Our biggest obstacle was running out of medicine, something that no parent should ever have to endure. Your child goes through everything that's asked. Surgeries. Radiation. Chemotherapy. And then when it comes time where you can no longer save his life, all you can do is keep him comfortable, you should be allowed to do that."

== Provisions ==
The law created a new state agency, the New Jersey Cannabis Regulatory Commission, in charge of running the state's medical cannabis program.

=== Sales and permits ===
Jake's Law more than doubled the number of cultivators allowed in the program from 12 to 28. Prior to passage of the law, companies involved in medical cannabis were simply known as “alternative treatment centers” with the production, processing, and distribution integrated into single organizations. This law created three different, distinct types of permits: cultivators, manufacturers, and dispensaries.

=== Taxes ===
On July 1, 2022, the 6.625% sales tax on medical cannabis came to an end.

=== Cannabis prescriptions ===
Under the law, patients only need to see their doctors once per year to maintain their cannabis prescriptions. Before the law, patients were required to go see their doctors every 3 months.

The law expanded access to patients from 2 to 3 ounces (57 to 85 g) per month, while removing limits altogether on terminally ill patients.

The law expanded the number of conditions that qualify for medical cannabis access, including adding chronic pain as a qualifier. After Jake's Law was signed, the following medical conditions counted as qualifying medical conditions for medical cannabis in New Jersey:

- AIDS
- Amyotrophic lateral sclerosis (ALS)
- Anxiety
- Cancer
- Chronic pain
- Dysmenorrhea
- Glaucoma
- HIV positive status
- Inflammatory bowel disease, including Crohn's disease
- Intractable skeletal muscular spasticity
- Migraines
- Multiple sclerosis
- Muscular dystrophy
- Opioid use disorder
- PTSD
- Seizure disorder, including epilepsy
- Terminal illness, if the patient has a prognosis of less than 12 months of life
- Tourette's syndrome

Additionally, the state's regulatory commission was given statutory authority to approve other conditions.

=== Employers ===
Under the law, companies are specifically prohibited from taking any adverse action against employees based on the employee's status as a medical cannabis patient.

The formal citation for Jake's Law is Jake Honig Compassionate Use Medical Cannabis Act, N.J.S.A. 24:6I-2, et seq.

== Legislative history ==
In 2018, New Jersey Governor Phil Murphy issued Executive Order No. 6, which tasked the state's Department of Health with issuing a report on the state's medical marijuana program.

New Jersey House Bill A20, introduced by Assemblywoman Joann Downey, made statutory changes to New Jersey's existing medical cannabis program and was based on that report.

Jake Honig's story had caught the attention of Downey's niece, Morgan Dias. After learning about Jake and his family, Downey named the bill the Jake Honig Compassionate Use Medical Cannabis Act.

As the bill worked its way through the state legislature, it passed the Assembly, 66-to-5, and passed the state Senate, 31-to-5.

== Bill signing ==
According to the Asbury Park Press, “[Governor Phil] Murphy signed the bill at Tommy's Tavern + Tap, a local restaurant, in front of dozens onlookers, many of whom were Honig's friends and family wearing #belikejake T-shirts.”

== See also ==
- Cannabis in New Jersey
- New Jersey Cannabis Regulatory Commission
- New Jersey Department of Health
