= Life FM =

Life FM may refer to:

Australia

- Life FM (Adelaide), 5RAM, a radio station in Adelaide, South Australia
- Life FM (Bathurst), 2BCB, a radio station in Bathurst, Central Tablelands, New South Wales
- Life FM (Bendigo), Central Victorian Gospel Radio Inc. in Bendigo, Victoria
- Life FM (Gippsland), 3GCB, a radio station in the Gippsland region of Victoria
- Life FM (Gold Coast), 4CAB, a radio station on the Gold Coast, Queensland
- Life FM (Wagga Wagga), 2WLF, a radio station in Wagga Wagga, New South Wales

Ireland

- Life FM (Cork), a Christian radio station in Cork, Ireland

New Zealand

- Life FM (New Zealand), a Christian radio network

South Africa

- Life FM (South Africa), a Christian community radio station based in the North West

United States

- The Life FM, a Christian radio network
