= Live on Earth =

Live on Earth may refer to:

- Live on Earth (Cat Empire album)
- Live... on Earth, a 2000 album by Krishna Das
- Live on Earth (Star One album)
- Live on Earth (UFO album)

== See also ==
- Living on Earth, an American radio news program
- Life on Earth (disambiguation)
- Live Earth, an event to increase environmental awareness through entertainment
