= New Jersey Cannabis Regulatory Commission =

U.S. state government agency regulating marijuana

Agency overview
- Formed: April 21, 2021
- Jurisdiction: New Jersey
- Headquarters: Trenton, New Jersey
- Website: www.nj.gov/cannabis/

The New Jersey Cannabis Regulatory Commission is a state government agency that regulates the sale of medicinal and recreational marijuana products in New Jersey.

== Organization ==
The New Jersey Cannabis Regulatory Commission was created through the enactment of the Jake Honig Compassionate Use Medical Cannabis Act, signed by Governor Phil Murphy on July 2, 2019.

The Commission, "in but not of the Department of the Treasury," was granted responsibility over the state's medical marijuana program.

== Leadership ==
The Commission has five members, all appointed by the governor. Commissioner Krista Nash, was named upon the recommendation of the Senate President and Commissioner Samuel Delgado from the House Speaker's recommendation.

In 2022, the Commission was led by its Chair, Dianna Houenou. Houenou was appointed to the position in 2021 by Governor Murphy. Previously, she worked as an advisor to Murphy and as an attorney with the New Jersey American Civil Liberties Union (ACLU). She earned her BA in Chemistry and Afro-American Studies from the University of North Carolina at Chapel Hill and her JD from the University of North Carolina School of Law.

On the staff side, the commission is headed by Executive Director Jeff Brown, a former state lobbyist. Brown oversees the offices and staff of the Commission. He has defended the commission's slow implementation of the state's recreational marijuana law.

== Legal history ==
=== Medical ===
New Jersey's original medical marijuana program began through legislation known as Compassionate Use of Medical Marijuana Act (CUMMA). It was later updated and patient access was expanded when the New Jersey Jake Honig Compassionate Use Medical Cannabis Act was implemented. Under current law, medical marijuana patients are allowed to access up to three ounces of marijuana from state-approved and regulated dispensaries every 30 days.

Prior to the passage of the Jake Honig Compassionate Use Medical Cannabis Act, medical marijuana was legal in New Jersey under the Medicinal Marijuana Program (MMP). The Honig Act updated and reformed the program, and created the New Jersey Cannabis Regulatory Commission. (In 2019, when this Act was signed into law, the state had not yet approved the sale of recreational marijuana). Prior to the law, the program was run by the Division of Medicinal Marijuana at the New Jersey Department of Health.

The Jake Honig Act also lifted the ceiling on marijuana amounts for terminally ill patients, allowing them unlimited access to the product.

=== Recreational ===
Cannabis was legalized by 2020 New Jersey Public Question 1 which amended the Constitution of New Jersey. In February 2021, the state legislature passed and the governor signed the Cannabis Regulatory, Enforcement Assistance, and Marketplace Modernization (CREAMM) Act which regulated the sale and possession of cannabis for adults 21 and over in New Jersey.

== State Supreme Court cases ==
In March 2020, the New Jersey Supreme Court ruled that people who are medical cannabis patients cannot be fired from their jobs for testing positive for marijuana if their usage is done off-duty. The case stemmed from a funeral director who was suffering from cancer and was a medical cannabis patient. He was in a car collision while working, and the follow-up drug test showed positive for cannabis. Even though he used the product legally while at home as treatment for his cancer, he was fired. The New Jersey Attorney General's Office supported the high court's ruling.

== Criticism ==
=== Slow implementation ===
New Jersey citizens voted for the legalization of adult recreational marijuana use in November 2020. The law was supposed to go into effect over a year later on February 20, 2022, although it was delayed. According to Financial Regulation News, the state "ignored the date, saying it was too early."

Executive Director Jeff Brown defended the state's sluggish implementation, saying, "Since the portal opened in December, potential cannabis entrepreneurs have been establishing accounts and beginning the application process, so we did not see the flurry of new accounts being set up today as we did on December 15."

Since passage of the recreational law, the commission has had a backlog of applications from medical cannabis companies. In April 2022, at the urging of the legislature, the commission held a special meeting to expedite approval of applications, although enough licenses still were not granted. The commission admitted that there is going to be a large gap between supply and demand (roughly 116,000-208,000 pounds of medical cannabis short of expected demand). Over a dozen cannabis companies applying for licenses sued the commission.

=== Appeals Court case ===
A New Jersey Appellate Division court reviewed a case brought by medical cannabis businesses that had applied for applications, in a case filed against the Commission. The appeals court sent the businesses back to the commission so that the companies could have a chance to show the commission where they had made mistakes. In its 75-page ruling, the court also warned the commission that it needed to give the companies the licenses they had applied for.

In a twist, 14 months after the ruling, the commission dug in its heels, issuing "a new round of denials." They opposed the findings of the court and defended their own actions. In the end, they defied the court and refused to change the scores they gave to the applications.

=== Discrimination ===
In January 2022, U.S. Rep. Donald Payne (D-NJ) criticized the Commission, saying in a press release that he was "outraged to hear that Black-owned businesses have been shut out of the state's cannabis marketplace." African American Chamber of Commerce of New Jersey President John Harmon joined in the criticism, saying that out of the 56 licenses awarded to date, none had been awarded to a black-owned business. Governor Phil Murphy's office defended the program and replied that applications had indeed gone to minority-owned businesses.

In February 2022, the Commission tweeted an image celebrating Black History Month. According to digital news site NJ.com, "It didn't go over well. The comments section was immediately barraged by a host of people asking one fundamental question: How many Black people had been licensed to grow and sell weed?"

The Commission "refused" to release data on minority licenses, according to NJ.com. However, "During the course of reporting on this story, one Black female medical cannabis dispensary awardee, Suzan Nickelson of Holistic Solutions, has come forward."

=== Fraud lawsuit ===
In 2022, the commission faced a discrimination lawsuit that "alleges fraud in the diversity certifications it uses to score license applicants".

== Gifting loophole ==
Due to the commission being slow to issue cannabis licenses, several companies proceeded with cannabis sales despite not having licenses in a process known as the "gifting loophole." The loophole takes advantage of the law's decriminalization of possession and sale of a small amount of cannabis, effectively making unlicensed sales of cannabis not punishable by any criminal penalty. However, civil penalties could arise.

== See also ==
- Cannabis in New Jersey
- List of United States cannabis regulatory agencies
- New Jersey Department of Health
