= Living Is for Everyone =

Living Is For Everyone (LIFE) is a suicide prevention initiative of the Australian Government's National Suicide Prevention Strategy (NSPS). The National Suicide Prevention Strategy funds a number of programs, some jointly funded with the National Mental Health Strategy. The programs, which operate in a range of settings, use population-based approaches with an emphasis on community capacity building. The LIFE initiative has two main components: the LIFE resources and the LIFE website.

The LIFE resources were redeveloped from a 2000 document and published in 2008. They are designed for people working with those at risk of suicide, with the broad intention of reducing the rate at which people take their own lives in Australia.

The LIFE resources have three components:

- The LIFE Framework – the Australian reference for suicide prevention activities;
- LIFE Research and Evidence – a review of statistics, trends, comparisons and issues in suicide and self-harm prevention; and
- LIFE fact sheets – a set of 24 fact sheets that provide summaries and advice about suicide prevention.
