= The Creatures (Australian band) =

Australian garage rock band (1965–1969)

- Also known as: The Beagle Boys, Chocolate
- Origin: Mildura, Victoria, Australia
- Genres: Garage rock, rock and roll, protopunk
- Years active: 1965–1969
- Label: Sound 66, RCA
- Past members: Eric Marcic; Herman Marcic; Rudolph Marcic; Keith Matcham; Michael Parnis; Richard White; Greg Lawrie

The Creatures were an Australian garage rock band which formed in Mildura, Victoria in 1965 as The Beagle Boys. They changed their name in February 1966 and relocated to Sydney where they were active during the mid- to late 1960s. The line-up included three Marcic brothers: Eric on guitar, Herman on bass guitar, and Rudolph on drums; together with Keith Matcham on lead vocals and Michael Parnis on rhythm guitar.

Australian music journalist, Glenn A. Baker, described their appearance: "at a time when moderate long hair was becoming acceptable, [they] dyed their tatty locks to bilious pastel shades and invited the media to react with appropriate horror". The group were billed as "the wildest, longest, coloured hair group in Australia, and 'Australia's answer to the Rolling Stones'". Richard White had replaced Parnis before the first single, "All I Do Is Cry" (1966), appeared. Hair colours were: red for Eric, blue for Herman, green for Rudolph, purple for Matcham, and pink for White.

The Creatures were known for their hard-driving 60's punk and protopunk sound, as typified by their singles, "All I Do Is Cry" (1966) and "Ugly Thing" (1967). Greg Lawrie replaced Eric on lead guitar prior to the second single. As Lawrie had "very short brown hair", he was given a red wig to wear, but during one performance "his wig came off! ... he put it back on and it was the wrong way, and he couldn’t see what he was doing." By December 1967 they had relocated to Melbourne and were renamed as Chocolate, where they issued another single, "I'm an Animal" (1969).

After the group disbanded, Lawrie joined Carson County Band in January of the following year. Herman played in Toby Jugg, alongside Garth Porter (later in Sherbet). In 1998 Kustom 65 record label issued a compilation album, It's a Kave-in!, with The Creatures' "All I Do Is Cry". The same track was covered by Shutdown 66 for the tribute album, Wild About You!, recorded live-in-the-studio by radio station, 3CR's Cara Beltrame in 2004.

== Discography ==
- "All I do is Cry" / "Mona" (sound 66 S45-01) (March 1966)
- "Ugly Thing" / "Your One and Only Man" (RCA 101803) (December 1967)
- "I'm an Animal" (released under the name Chocolate, 1969).
