= Yisheng Yishi =

Yisheng Yishi (一生一世), meaning "lifetime", may refer to:

- 1314 sounds like "一生一世"
- But Always, 2014 Chinese-Hong Kong romantic drama film
- Forever and Ever (TV series), 2021 Chinese romantic television series

== See also ==
- Forever and Ever (disambiguation)
- 一生 (disambiguation)
