= New Jersey Department of Health =

Government agency

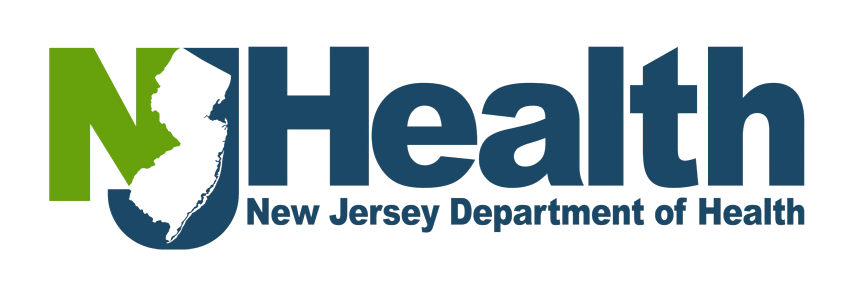
- Logo of the NJDOH

Department overview
- Formed: July 1, 1947; 79 years ago
- Preceding department: New Jersey State Board of Health
- Jurisdiction: Government of New Jersey
- Headquarters: 55 North Willow Street, Trenton, New Jersey 08625
- Annual budget: US$2.4 billion (FY2027) (40% federal)
- Department executive: Dr. Raynard Washington, Commissioner
- Website: https://www.nj.gov/health/

The New Jersey Department of Health (NJDOH) is a governmental agency of the U.S. state of New Jersey. New Jersey's State Board of Health was established in 1877. Its administrative functions were vested in the Department of Health, which was created in 1947. In 1996, the latter was renamed the Department of Health and Senior Services (DHSS). In 2012, senior services programs moved back into the Department of Human Services, and DHSS again became the Department of Health.

== Overview ==
The department oversees numerous types of health facilities, for example hospitals, family planning, psychiatric hospitals, drug abuse treatment, primary care facilities, nursing homes, hospice care, assisted living, adult day care, and therapies and tests such as hemodialysis. There are four branches: Office of Policy and Strategic Planning, Office of Population Health, Health Systems, and Public Health Services.

== Commissioners ==
The Commissioners of the New Jersey Department of Health have spanned 25 terms:

- 20th - Christopher Rinn
- 21st - Shereef Elnahal (starting January 25, 2018)
- 22nd - Judith Persichilli
- 23rd - Dr. Kaitlan Baston
- 24th - Jeffrey A. Brown
- 25th - Dr. Raynard Washington

== Timeline ==
In 2006, New Jersey’s Department of Health and Senior Services began licensing private medevac helicopter companies to supplement State Police helicopters. In December 2007, the Public Health Council of New Jersey approved the first state policy in the United States mandating flu vaccines for all New Jersey children, in order for those children to be allowed to attend preschools and day-care centers.

The New Jersey Department of Health and Senior Services approved the decision of Memorial Hospital of Salem County on April 1, 2014. The health department noted that the hospital had only one obstetrician at the staff, and births at the hospital had dropped from 385 in 2004 to 155 in 2012. As a condition of the closure, the hospital was still required to transport patients to other inpatient maternity services, or provide emergency stabilization to women arrive pregnant, and delivery in cases where birth is imminent. A local healthcare union spoke out against the decision, and Health Professionals and Allied Employees argued the closure would negatively affect local income-women. In the end of May 2014, the hospital closed its maternity ward.

In 2017, the NJ Department of Health joined with the New Jersey Department of Environmental Protection to warn residents that New Jersey homes were at a high risk of naturally occurring radon gas leaking in, and killing residents. 22 areas in New Jersey were listed as high risk, with many of the areas concentrated in Northwest New Jersey. Also in April 2017, Paterson councilman Michael Jackson stated that because every municipality did not have its own board of health, Paterson was "currently operating illegally." He said that the city council was legally obligated to fulfill duties as the de facto Board of Health, and hold one annual meeting. His argument fell into dispute.

In 2018, the department found in an investigation that around 3,000 patients could have been exposed to bloodborne diseases at Saddle Brook, New Jersey. In late October 2018 the department sent a team of infection control experts and epidemiologists to several pediatric healthcare facilities in the state to "assess infection-control procedures and to train staff," after deaths in the 2018 United States adenovirus outbreak at the Wanaque Center for Nursing and Rehabilitation. On October 13, 2018, the New Jersey Department of Health clarified they were investigating 26 cases with nine deaths, all at Wanaque.

On April 5, 2019, the NJ Department of Health reported that New Jersey had seen 13 measles cases that year, and that 13,000 New Jersey schoolchildren or more were unvaccinated. In April 2019, health officials from the department responded to a possible measles outbreak at a New Jersey restaurant.

On July 12, 2021, Governor Phil Murphy announced that New Jersey residents with a valid email address or phone number on-file with New Jersey Immunization Information System (NJIIS) could access a digital replacement copy of their COVID-19 immunization record using the Docket app in partnership with New York-based Docket Health, Inc.

== Divisions and offices ==
The NJ Department of Health is further divided into the following divisions and offices within New Jersey state government:

- Cancer Epidemiology Services
- Communicable Disease Service - The service works to prevent communicable diseases from spreading among the population of New Jersey.
- Community Health and Wellness - This division promotes healthy lifestyles including anti-smoking, chronic disease management, and promotion of good nutrition and fitness.
- Consumer, Environmental and Occupational Health Service - FHS administers programs including WIC, the Special Child Health and Early Intervention Service, primary care and rural health care, maternal and child health, and the Community Health and Wellness service.
- Office of Emergency Medical Services - Created in 1967, the OEMS was the first state agency of its kind in the United States. OEMS is in charge of certifying EMTs and paramedics, ambulances, mobile intensive care units, specialty care transport units and air medical units.
- Division of Family Health Services
- Office of Health Care Financing
- Health Systems
- Healthcare Quality & Assessment Office
- Division of HIV/AIDS, TB & STD Services
- Medicinal Cannabis Program (regulated by the New Jersey Cannabis Regulatory Commission) - The Jake Honig Compassionate Use Medical Cannabis Act established the state's medical cannabis program. The program helps qualified patients access cannabis-based medicine from state-regulated dispensaries.
- Office of Minority & Multicultural Health
- Division of Public Health Infrastructure, Laboratories & Emergency Preparedness
- Office of Vital Statistics and Registry

== Programs ==
- State Health Insurance Program (SHIP) - a statewide program of the New Jersey Department of Health and Senior Services.
- Doulas - In 2019, The New Jersey Department of Health put $450,000 into creating a doula program in areas with high black infant mortality rates.
- Lead testing - The department funds an initiative to hand out free lead kits to families in New Jersey.
- Practitioner Orders for Life-Sustaining Treatment (POLST) - In April 2017, it became known that the NJ Department of Health was working with the New Jersey Hospital Association to jointly develop electronic access for the POLST initiative, which was signed by the governor in 2011 to allow New Jersey residents to detail their healthcare choices.
- Zika Hotline - As well as a pregnancy registry, the department maintains a Zika hotline.
- Population Health Heroes - In 2017, the department accepted applications to name several people from New Jersey as Population Health Heroes.
- ScreenNJ - The New Jersey Department of Health in 2019 developed the ScreenNJ cancer screening initiative with the Rutgers Cancer Institute of New Jersey.

== Studies ==
The department sometimes releases its own studies, and comments on other studies that use its data. For example, the department collects data on fatal work injuries in New Jersey. According to the department, around 1,500 New Jersey resident died in 2014 from kidney disease, making kidney disease the ninth leading cause of death for state residents. The department keeps a Zika Pregnancy Registry to watch for Zika, and out of 59 pregnant women on the registry, 23 babies tested positive by April 2017.

== Related legislation ==
- 1947: Act of May 22, 1947, P.L. 1947, c. 177
- 1948: State Department of Health Act of 1948, P.L. 1948, c. 444
- 2012: Act of June 29, 2012, P.L. 2012, c. 17
