= Life (Tchaikovsky's unfinished symphony) =

Pyotr Tchaikovsky's unfinished symphony

Life (unfinished symphony)
- Choral symphony by Pyotr Tchaikovsky
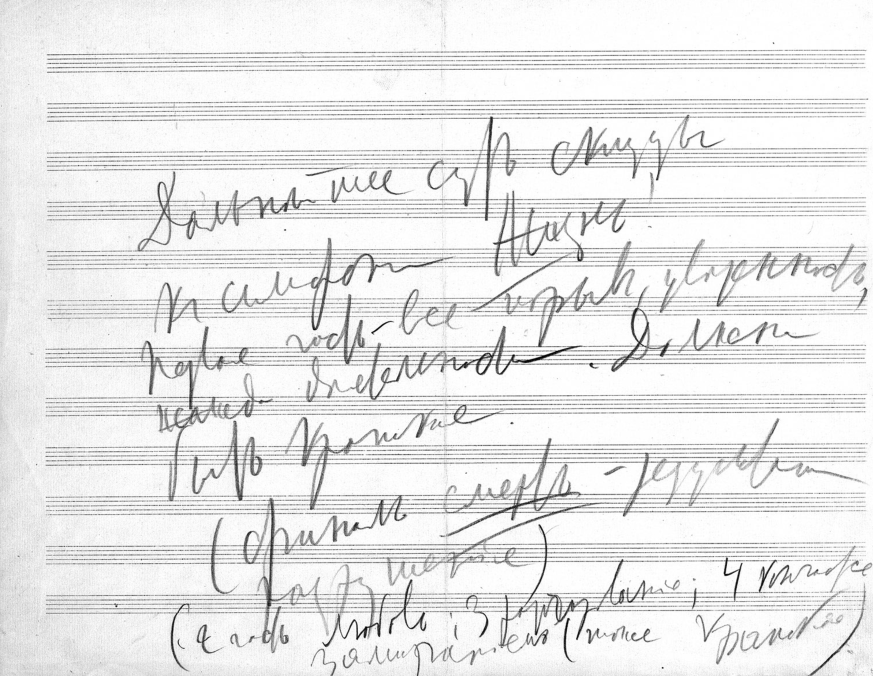
- Sketches of the program of the symphony Life. From the collections of the State Memorial Music Museum-Reserve of P. I. Tchaikovsky
- Key: E♭ major
- Composed: Early 1890s (either in 1890 or 1891, incomplete)

Symphony Life (in Russian Симфо́ния «Жизнь») is an unfinished work by the Russian Romantic composer Pyotr Ilyich Tchaikovsky, on which he was presumably working in 1890 or 1891. In the Russian Thematic and Bibliographical Catalogue of the Works of P. I. Tchaikovsky, the sketches for it are included in ČW 443, and in the 2002 Bloomington & Indianapolis English-language thematic-systematic catalogue, it is included in TchH 238; in both catalogues, this is the Symphony in E♭ major. It is common to refer to this symphony as two sheets of textual inscriptions and associated sheet music sketches made by the composer. Art historians agree that they correspond with the time of the composition of Tchaikovsky's string sextet Souvenir de Florence.

In musicology, there are two different points of view regarding the dating. Some scholars have argued that the Symphony Life was conceived long before the unfinished Symphony in E♭ major (1892) and the famous Sixth Symphony (1893) and that its conception and surviving sketches date back to 1890. This view has been held by, among others, Dr. Julius Kremlin and Dr. Arnold Alshwang.

Another point of view, for example, was expressed in 1958 in the scientific publication The Musical Heritage of P. I. Tchaikovsky: From the History of His Works, and in 1970 it was substantiated by Vladimir Blok, a candidate of art history. According to this view, the text and musical sketches date back to 1891, and the Symphony Life is not a separate idea of Tchaikovsky, but the original title, program, and sketches for the Symphony in E♭ major, which was destroyed by the composer himself. Individual movements of the Symphony in E♭ major were at the same time incorporated into other works by the composer. The composer subsequently abandoned the title Life for this symphony in the course of working on it.

Another point of view, for example, was expressed in 1958 in the non-fiction publication The Musical Heritage of P. I. Tchaikovsky: From the History of His Works, and in 1970 it was substantiated by Vladimir Blok, a candidate of art history. According to this view, the text and musical sketches date back to 1891, and the Symphony Life is not a separate idea of Tchaikovsky, but the original title, program, and sketches for the Sixth Symphony, which was destroyed by the composer himself. Individual movements of the Symphony in E♭ major were at the same time incorporated into other works by the composer. The composer subsequently abandoned the title Life for this symphony in the course of working on it. The academic discussion was reflected in journalism and documentary films. The title of this symphony became the title of the exhibitions held at the Tchaikovsky State House-Museum in Klin in connection with the 175th and 180th anniversaries of the composer's birth.

== The Symphony's intention in Tchaikovsky's sketches and researchers' attempts of their dating ==
=== Autographed sketches of the symphony ===
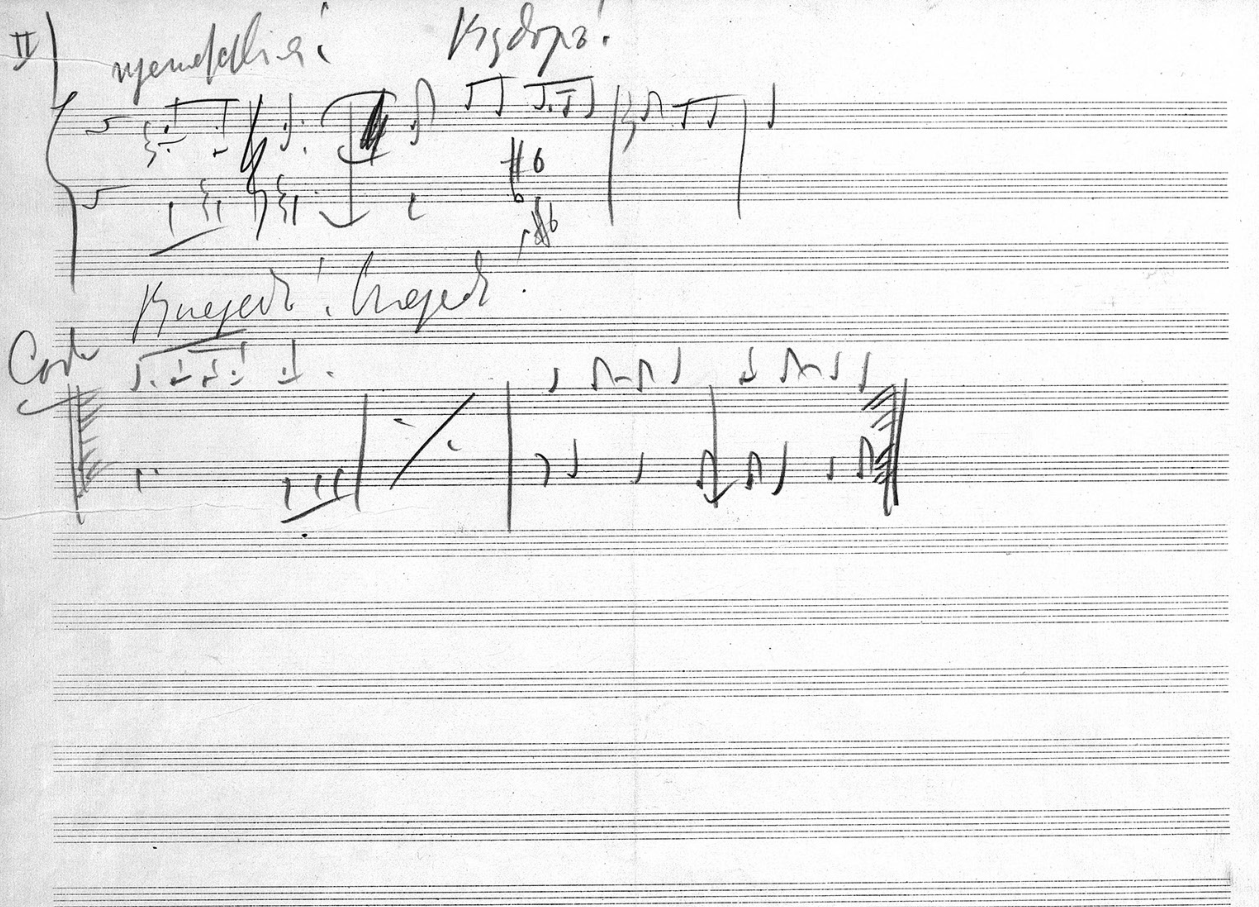
Pyotr Tchaikovsky. Sketches of the symphony Life. From the funds of the State Memorial Music Museum-Reserve of P. Tchaikovsky

Pyotr Ilyich Tchaikovsky's inscriptions on the back of the musical sketch for his sextet for strings Souvenir de Florence are usually associated with the idea of composing the Symphony Life. This sketch was not included in the published version of the sextet. The size of this sheet of music paper is 36 × 34 cm.

On a sheet of music paper, Tchaikovsky wrote the following text: “The following are the sketches for the symphony Life! The first part is all impulse, confidence, thirst for activity. Should be brief. (The finale: death – the result of destruction). (2nd part: love; 3rd: disappointment; 4th ends with faltering, also brief)”. On another separate sheet is a musical sketch of the First Movement of the Life Symphony in the key of E♭ major and in the time signature 3/4 or possibly 6/8. This sheet preserves notes concerning, according to Yuly Kremlev, a doctor of art history, part of the first movement of this symphony: “Life. I) Youth”. On the back were additional note sketches and the text: “II) Obstacles!”, “Nonsense!”, “Coda. Forward! Forward!”

By order of Tchaikovsky's younger brother, Modest, the chest containing the composer's manuscripts was transported from Klin to Moscow in 1905 and placed in the fireproof room of Pyotr Jurgenson's publishing house. After Modest Ilyich’s death in 1916, having left his elder brother's legacy to the Moscow branch of the Russian Musical Society, the chest was opened at the museum of the Moscow Conservatoire. The opening procedure was described in detail by musicologist and folklorist Julius Engel, who noted that there was no key to the chest’s lock, necessitating the services of a locksmith. Inside, the chest contained music manuscripts dating from Tchaikovsky’s conservatory years up to the last months of his life, as well as notebooks, sketches of librettos, letters, and some of Tchaikovsky's personal items. Among the contents, Engel mentioned previously unknown sketches of the Symphony Life.

Information about these recordings was published in 1950 in the first volume, Autographs to Musical Works: Notebooks and Diaries, of the Soviet edition Tchaikovsky's Autographs in the Archives of the Tchaikovsky State House-Museum in Klin: Handbook, in the section VIII. Sketches for Unrealised Projects. They were characterized as follows:

Symphony Life (conceived 1890–1892). Sketches of themes (23 volumes), (Note: The compilers of the edition noted that the time signatures in some cases are conventional, as Tchaikovsky did not specify any "time signatures" himself, and the metrical structure left unspecified by the composer can be interpreted in various ways.)11 in E♭ major and an outline of the program, on the reverse of the sheet with a sketch of the sextet theme Souvenir de Florence. The sheet is torn from a music notebook containing sketches for the ballet The Nutcracker and the opera Iolanta. Before the program sketch, the composer’s inscription reads: “The following are the sketches for the symphony Life!” Notes in pencil. Cipher A, a1, L No. 67, folder XXII.

In that edition, a subsequently forgotten attempt was made to distinguish clearly between two types of preparatory recordings by the composer for future musical works: "sketch" and "draft". The former term implies "a more finished and complete fixing of the musical content", while the latter refers to a more "sketchy, working record". Also distinguished were "sketches of the rough draft manuscript", understood to be "actually a completely exhaustive fixing of the entire work". The compilers emphasized the great importance of the sketch stage in Tchaikovsky's work, claiming it was the composer’s favourite and most crucial stage in the process of creating a piece. They quoted a letter from Tchaikovsky himself to reveal its peculiarities: “I write my sketches on the first sheet of paper I can find, and sometimes even on a scrap of sheet music paper. I write in very abbreviated form; melody can never appear in my mind except together with harmony. In general, both these elements of music, together with rhythm, can never be separated from each other, for example, every melodic thought carries in itself the implied harmony, and is necessarily has a rhythmic division”.

Tchaikovsky made his musical notes in all circumstances and under all conditions, whenever ideas arose. Often, this took place on the road, during walks, and sketches were made on the first piece of paper he found — on desk pad, letters, and in notebooks. Usually, the musical notes were accompanied by textual remarks referring to the form of the musical work, the future harmonization of the recorded melody, and the forthcoming instrumentation.

The autographs of recordings relating to the Symphony Life are now part of the collection at the State Memorial Music Museum-Reserve of P. I. Tchaikovsky under marks A, A1, No. 67, folder XII. (Note: Thomas Kohlhase attributed the composer's work on the Life Symphony to A1, no. 45, folder XII – Symphony in E-flat Major, 1891-1892 (sketches presumably for it). 1. Sketch in E minor, 9 volumes in a notebook with sketches for The Nutcracker and Iolanta. Above the sketch is the date: "May 22 / 10, 91, In the Ocean". Below the sketch of the theme in F major. 8th volume. Sheet torn out. Recorded in pencil. Cipher A, a1, No. 45, folder XII".) Three sheets from the collection contain sketches for the second act of the ballet The Nutcracker and for individual numbers of the opera Iolanta. Sheet 1 contains sketches of themes in E♭ minor (dated 10 May 1891, on the sea), F major, and A minor. Sheets 2 and 3 contain an outline “for sextet” (first page), and the following three pages contain sheet music in E♭ major for the Life Symphony with textual program additions. The transcription of Pyotr Ilyich’s sketches for the Symphony Life was published in The Musical Heritage of P. I. Tchaikovsky: From the History of His Works in 1958.

The Thematic and Bibliographical Catalogue of P. I. Tchaikovsky's Works, published in 2006 (information about the outline for the Life Symphony is provided only in English, unlike most other fragments, which include a Russian translation in the text of the index), offers some details about the composer's notes related to this symphony: "3 sheets numbered as follows: sheets I, II, pp. 1-2 (May 1891). In pencil ... pp. 1 (above the sketch): "22 May / 10, 91. In the ocean". L. I contains a sketch marked for sextet (3 folios numbered as follows: folios 1, II, pp. 1-2 [not used] [May 1891]. In pencil ... P. 1 (above the sketch): "May 22 / 10, 91. In the ocean"). F. I contains a sketch marked for the sextet". The Thematic and Bibliographical Catalogue of Tchaikovsky's Works includes the sketches for the Life Symphony in ČW 443, which corresponds to the Symphony in E♭ major, while the 2002 Bloomington & Indianapolis English-language thematic-systematic catalogue lists them in TchH 238, which also corresponds to the Symphony in E♭ major.

The sketches for the Life Symphony were published in Tchaikovsky's international New Complete Works, volume 39c, devoted to the Symphony Pathétique. It was published in 2003 in Russian (Moscow) and German (Mainz).

=== First attempt of sketches dating ===
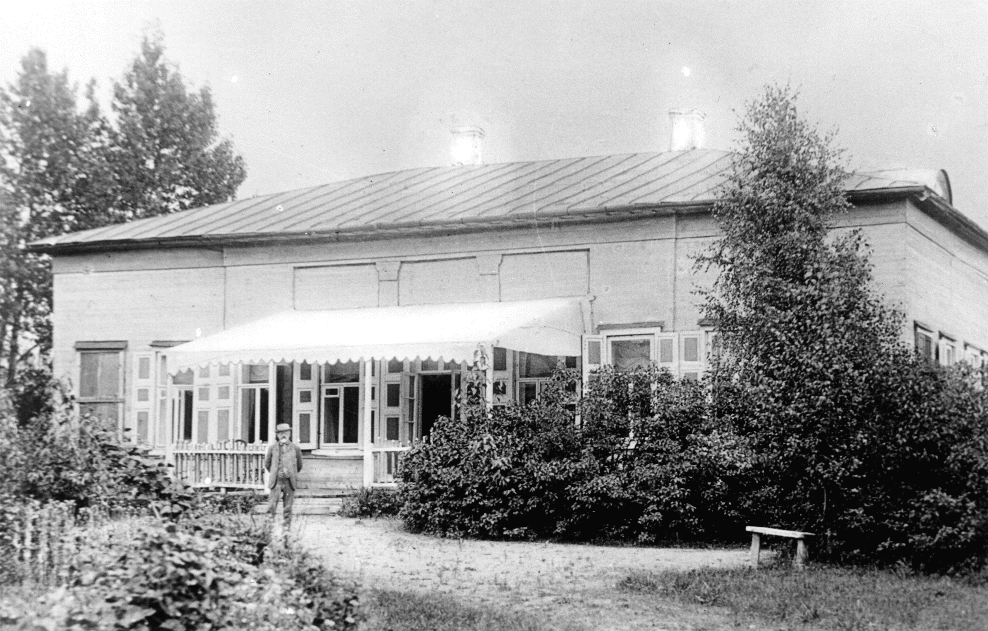
Tchaikovsky near his house in Frolovsky, 1890

In the chapter The Sixth Symphony of his 1955 book The Symphonies of P. I. Tchaikovsky, Doctor of Art History Yuli Kremlyov made a clear distinction between what he considered to be the three unrealized plans of three different symphonies by Pyotr Ilyich Tchaikovsky from the early 1890s: E♭ major, Life, and E minor. Arnold Alschwang, a Soviet musicologist and Doctor of Art History, approached the concept of different symphonic ideas preceding the Sixth Symphony and suggested in 1940 in his article Tchaikovsky's Last Symphony that the idea for the Life Symphony arose in Tchaikovsky's mind directly while he was working on Souvenir de Florence — in 1890. (Note: Grigory Moiseev, Candidate of Art History, provides a detailed account of the sextet and its history in his dissertation for the degree of Candidate of Art History, presented at the Department of History of Russian Music at the Tchaikovsky Moscow State Conservatory (2006), as well as in the monograph Tchaikovsky's Chamber Ensembles, published based on the dissertation in 2009.) The notes are made on the back of a sheet of music with sketches of this work.

The composer had the idea for the sextet as early as 1886. Several times, he attempted to begin work on the piece but abandoned it. Only on 13 June 1890 did work on the piece begin, and in the 20s of July of the same year, it was completed with the creation of its instrumentation. The candidate of art history, Grigory Moiseyev, however, wrote that it is difficult to restore the chronology of the appearance of the sextet due to the fact that not all the sketches of this work have reached our time. The place of the work was Frolovskoye, in the suburbs of the town of Klin, where the composer was living at the time, renting an estate house. The work was interrupted during Tchaikovsky's journeys.

In Alschwang's opinion, the composer used the blank side of the sheet to write down the title of the symphony Life, as he usually did when “starting a new big work”. He placed the note sketches for it on a separate sheet of paper. The art historian wrote: “This was only possible in the case of a sudden creative impulse: then, as always in such cases, the composer used any paper or book that happened to be at hand”. Alschwang wrote that the Life Symphony was conceived long before the unfinished Symphony in E♭ major (1892) and the Sixth Symphony (1893). He tried to track down any other sketches by the composer that might relate to the Life Symphony but was forced to state: “We have not been able to find any other verbal or musical notes that directly or indirectly relate to the Symphony Life”.

=== Second attempt of sketches dating ===
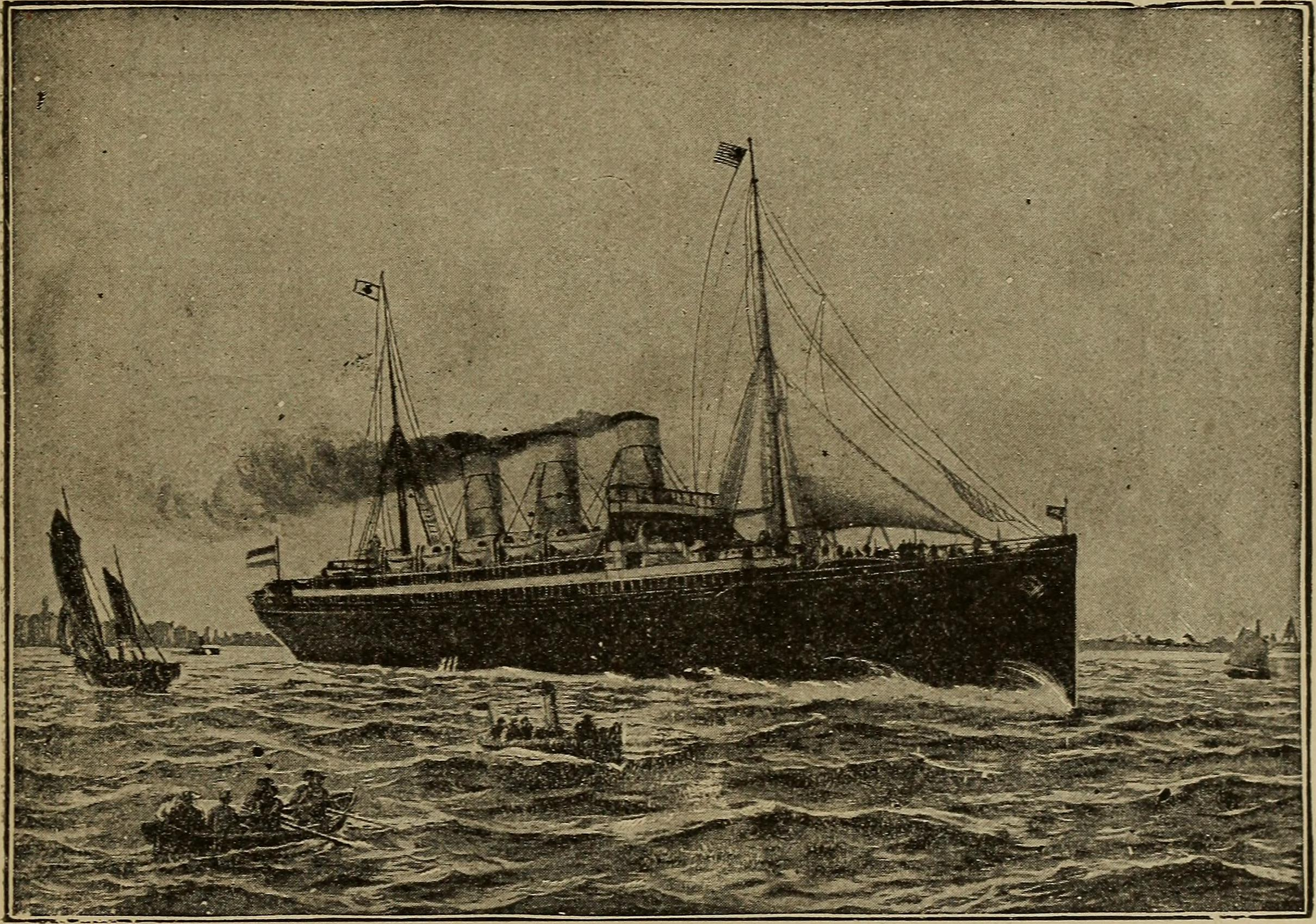
The steamer Bismarck in 1893.

In the same year, 1970, in his article On the Way to the Pathetique, Vladimir Blok, a candidate of art history, concluded that the notion of several symphonies on which Tchaikovsky allegedly worked between the Fifth and Sixth Symphonies was a profound misconception. The Symphony in E♭ major, the Life Symphony, and the Symphony in E minor, about which Soviet art historians have written, are, in his belief, one and the same work. The main theme of Part I of the Symphony in E♭ major is a transformation of a theme from the outline of the Life Symphony. Blok wrote: “It is clear that the most striking intonational links of these tonally identical themes... reveal their undoubted kinship”. He even claimed that it was this variant that supplanted the original version in the final version of Tchaikovsky's sheet music. A number of themes from the same notebook never made it into the Symphony in E♭ major, but Blok ironically noted: “it is unlikely that anyone, based only on the presence of sketch themes that were not included in the score of The Queen of Spades, would conclude that Tchaikovsky had a simultaneous idea for an unrealized opera...”

Vladimir Blok wrote that Tchaikovsky was not in the habit of working simultaneously on several major instrumental works, although he noted that Tchaikovsky often had major scenic ideas almost simultaneously; however, even in such cases, reflection on these ideas did not develop into work on the music for them. Blok did not even allow for the idea that the composer could have begun composing the E♭ major Symphony if work on the E minor and Life symphonies had been in progress for a long time and had not been completed by that time. He claimed: “With Tchaikovsky concentrating on the consistent embodiment of the musical imagery that possessed his creative imagination in a given period of time... this way of working was unnatural and almost unprecedented".

Blok also provided some textual arguments:

- In Blok's opinion, the sketches for the symphony Life were created in 1891 on sheets torn from a notebook containing sketches for the ballet The Nutcracker and the opera Iolanta, which Tchaikovsky was working on at the time. The notion of three symphonies, from Blok's point of view, is related to the erroneous dating of the torn-out sheets containing the notes “Further essence skitsza to the symphonie Life!” and associated with the string sextet Souvenir de Florence. This erroneous dating was made by Alschwang, who attributed them to 1890. However, only the first edition of the sextet was composed in 1890, with the second realized in 1891. In Blok's opinion, it is to the second that these recordings should be attributed. That is why they ended up in a notebook with sketches for The Nutcracker and Iolanta, on which he was working in 1891. During a trip to the United States in 1891, Tchaikovsky had with him the notebooks of The Nutcracker and Iolanta, which are now part of the collection of the composer's House-Museum in Klin. They are registered under the signature A1, nos. 44 and 45.

Supporting his point of view, the researcher cited a letter from the composer to Mikhail Ippolitov-Ivanov dated 3 June (just after the end of his journey to the USA), in which Tchaikovsky expressed his desire to “radically rework the string sextet”. During the journey, he had already begun sketching a new version. (Note: Candidate of Art History Grigory Moiseyev, in his monograph Tchaikovsky's Chamber Ensembles (2009), places the chronological framework of the composer's actual work on the second edition of the sextet between January 12-15, 1892, while the idea and individual sketches for the revision are traced back to June of the previous year.)

- There is another sheet torn from the same notebook from which the two sheets containing the sketches for the Symphony Life were torn. It bears the date—10 May (New Style—22 May) 1891. On the same day (10 May), returning from the USA and being on board the steamer Bismarck in the Atlantic Ocean, the composer wrote in his diary the following phrase: “At 8 o'clock the first breakfast. I am having scrambled eggs and drinking tea with cake. The tea is good. Then I walk on the lower deck, study, read. By studying I mean sketches for a future symphony”. In Blok's opinion, this symphony refers to the Symphony in E♭ major Life, which was wrongly attributed to 1890.
- There is not even the slightest mention of abandoning the idea of composing the Life Symphony in the composer's notes, which contradicts Tchaikovsky's custom of sharing the progress of his works with people close to him. Neither Modest Tchaikovsky nor researchers who have studied Tchaikovsky's sketches in detail, such as Boris Asafiev or Semyon Bogatyryov, have ever mentioned Pyotr Ilyich's plans to compose the Symphony in E minor or the Life Symphony.

As a result, Blok concluded that the E♭ major Symphony was originally intended to be called Life, but later Tchaikovsky abandoned this title. Blok repeated a significant number of his conclusions in his article Restoration of Tchaikovsky's Es-dur Symphony (1972), which was included in the collection S. S. Bogatyryov. Articles. Studies. Memories.

Despite Vladimir Blok's conviction that the conclusions of the article belonged to him, they are already contained in the 1958 edition of Tchaikovsky's Musical Heritage: From the History of His Works (compiled by Elena Orlova, Doctor of Art History, and Ksenia Davydova). In it, the sketches for the Symphony Life and the Symphony in E minor were perceived as plans for the Symphony in E♭ major, and the sketches for the Symphony Life were unequivocally dated 1891.

== The symphony in Soviet musicology ==
Julius Kremlyov, a Doctor of Art History, made a clear distinction between what he considered to be three unrealized plans for three different symphonies by Pyotr Ilyich Tchaikovsky from the early 1890s: E♭ major, Life, and E minor. Julius Kremlyov attributed the sketches of Tchaikovsky's Life Symphony to the early 1890s. He analyzed Tchaikovsky's short remarks about the intentions of this symphony that accompanied the musical sketches.

The researcher wrote that Tchaikovsky's original intentions changed unrecognizably in the process of composing the musical work, so it is impossible to judge from the surviving textual and musical records "about possible concrete ways of realizing his idea in this unrealized symphony". One can only clearly imagine "the direction of the idea itself". Tchaikovsky intended to create a philosophical musical poem about human life: youth, maturity, old age, and death. Kremlyov even suggested that the composer might have been inspired by works of literature, such as Ivan Goncharov's novel Oblomov.

In particular, Kremlyov believed that Tchaikovsky intended to make "love" and "disappointment" the basis of the program of the Life Symphony, which, in the art historian's opinion, is quite traditional. He considered it original to address the image of death as an image of "destruction." He noted the irreligiousness of such a conception. The conclusion that Kremlyov made on this basis was: "Tchaikovsky's idea, although gravitating at times to religion, still persistently tried in artistic images to do without God, only man, his passions, and events of his real life". According to Kremlyov, the composer wanted to create an "objective concept" — to write "by means of symphonic music the history of the soul from the outside." The attempt proved to be self-defeating, as it did not align with Tchaikovsky's lyrical talent, which he eventually realized himself.

Dr. Arnold Alschwang, a Doctor of Art History, first in an article on the Sixth Symphony for the magazine Sovetskaya Muzyka and then in his 800-page monograph P. I. Tchaikovsky, published in 1970, wrote that the idea of the unrealized Symphony Life, which was to summarize the main stages of human life, had so strongly taken hold of the composer's consciousness — who had always sought "to comprehend through music the most general problems of life", that Tchaikovsky could no longer abandon this theme, "especially as it was the result of so many private problems that occupied the composer throughout his entire creative activity". The outcome of his reflections on this theme was the Sixth Symphony. Alschwang also noted that the simplified musical notations made by the composer on the program sheets of the never-written Symphony Life fully correspond to the content of the textual notes.

Doctor of Art History Ekaterina Ruchievskaya assessed the Symphony Life as one of the stages on the way to "a symphony as a work that should become the sum of artistic work, the result of a whole life's meditations". She dated the note sketches and program for the Symphony Life to 1891. The composer later abandoned the "biographical" program characteristic of the Symphony Life, and the symphony itself remained only an unfulfilled project.

In his monograph The Symphonies Created by P. I. Tchaikovsky (1981), Alexander Dolzhansky, a candidate of art history, distinguished not three but only two different unrealized symphonic ideas of Tchaikovsky. To the years 1890–1892, in his opinion, belong the sketches of the Symphony Life. He attributed to them only those of the composer's recordings that Kremlyov had made. To another symphonic idea that took possession of Tchaikovsky's thoughts at the same time, he attributed Tchaikovsky's notes: "Motive: Why? Why? For what?... The beginning and the main idea of the whole symphony", "The motif for the finale after Why?... At first there is no answer, and then suddenly solemn." In both cases, according to the musicologist, it is not a question of the program of each of the symphonies, but "of defining the theme of the symphony, the subject of its philosophical reflection". Dolzhansky believed that the rough sketches of the Symphony of Life provide material for reflection on the ideological conception of the Symphony Pathetique: "Human life, its meaning, its facets, pictures of the development of its most important aspects formed the main content of Tchaikovsky's last symphony".

The opinion of Nadezhda Nikolaeva, candidate of art history, coincides with Dolzhansky's point of view. She also singled out Tchaikovsky's unfulfilled symphonic ideas: "the program symphony Life" and the E minor symphony. In both cases, the composer intended "a work of great tragic theme". The main idea of the Life Symphony, however, is "the struggle between life and death, creation and destruction". In Nikolaeva's opinion, the composer's notes testify to the presence in the Life Symphony of a program telling of the human journey from youth to death. The Es-dur Symphony, which was destroyed by the composer because it "did not correspond to the direction of the composer's creative intentions in this genre," in Nikolaeva's view is the precursor of the Pathetique (Sixth) Symphony.

Candidate of Art History Nadezhda Tumanina, analyzing the final period of the composer's life in the second volume The Great Master. 1878–1893 (1968) of her monograph on the composer, wrote that Tchaikovsky was obsessed with the idea of a program symphony entitled Life, but he did not yet have complete clarity about it. In the main theme, written in E minor, the author of the book found "declamatory expressiveness and melodic chanting" (it is similar to the mood of the Sixth Symphony). This theme was to be, in Tumanina's opinion, the leitmotif of the entire symphony. The second theme, of a harsh and heroic nature, is the opposite of the leitmotif and is more typical of the Finale of the composer's Fifth Symphony. In this theme, the rhythm of a march is noticeable, its "sharply ascending direction of melody" opposing the descending direction of the leitmotif. Tchaikovsky stopped work on this symphony. In the same notebook are sketches of the future Symphony in E♭ major.

According to Tumanina, Tchaikovsky was floundering between different conceptions of the idea: "Sometimes he was attracted by the idea of creating a heroic symphony, where light images would be affirmed; sometimes a completely opposite conception emerged, and the idea of embodying in musical images the tragic side of life—the hard road to death—came to the fore". To the second variant, she referred the notes under the heading "Why? Why? What for?" as well as the notes of 10 (22) May 1891, which were originally made in a notebook with sketches for the ballet The Nutcracker, but later Tchaikovsky tore them out. According to the art historian, the main idea of the Symphony Life in E♭ major was supposed to be the opposition between life and death, but the surviving musical sketches, with inscriptions by the composer himself, are not tragic after all. Tumanina assumed that these were themes for the First Movement of the symphony. The theme, entitled "Life. 1) Youth," is filled with light and joy. In another theme, composed on board the steamer Bismarck, "mournful, sadly deepened intonations create an image full of detachment and some sublime suffering". Later, however, Tchaikovsky abandoned the tragic version of the symphony in favor of a heroic version with a predominance of luminous images. During the summer of the same year, while composing the opera Iolanta, Tchaikovsky sketched another series of ideas "for the finale of the symphony in E♭ major." These sketches, although they were not included in the later Symphony in E♭ major, demonstrate that the composer now viewed the end as an image of "the victory of life and the human will". That same summer of 1891, Tchaikovsky finally settled on the concept of an optimistic symphony. Work on the Symphony in E♭ major in its modern sense took the composer the whole of 1892, but "the symphony composed in sketches did not satisfy the composer and he stopped orchestrating it." Tchaikovsky himself reworked its first movement into the only movement of the Piano Concerto No. 3.

Yulia Rozanova, Professor at the Moscow Conservatoire and Candidate of Art History, wrote in her multi-volume History of Russian Music (1981 and 1986) that even before composing his Sixth Symphony, Tchaikovsky had the idea of creating a symphonic work on the theme of the struggle between Good and Evil, but the composer did not have complete clarity. In the sketches of the idea that was never realized, Tchaikovsky could not settle on a definite philosophical concept: at times he was drawn to "the idea of the triumph of the bright beginning, the affirmation of images of happiness, joy, and creative labor," while at other times the tragic side of life, as a hard, suffering path to death and destruction, came to the fore. Rozanova referred to this symphony as Life, considered it a program symphony, and claimed that with it the composer intended to sum up the results of his creative journey. Rozanova considered the E♭ major Symphony to be part of this great work — a work of "lyrical and genre plan with an optimistic conception".

== The symphony in modern Russian musicology ==
The 8th volume of History of Russian Music, published in 1994, devotes some attention to the Symphony Life. It quotes a fragment of the composer's notes in connection with the conception of this symphony. The author of the article in The History of Russian Music, Doctor of Art History Yuri Keldysh, attributes it to the various plans and sketches that preceded the work on the Sixth Symphony. The researcher draws attention to the fact that it is here that "the seed of the idea that was realized two years later in the Sixth Symphony emerges".

Pauline Weidman, PhD in art history, analyzed Tchaikovsky's notes in his notebooks in her article Tchaikovsky's Word in the Manuscripts of His Instrumental Works (2003). She divided the notes into two groups: 1) constructive-technological, which are similar to the notes of other composers; 2) associative, which are of a personal and biographical nature. These remarks, from Weidman's point of view, are located next to the musical sketches and are related to the life impulses underlying the composer's creative process ("a biographical event, reflections on the 'fateful questions of existence' or impressions from reading"). These notes appear in the early stages of the work during the process of conception. Their presence, according to Weidman, indicates that Tchaikovsky needed "a clear idea, often formulated verbally". As an example, Weidman cited the notes: "Further essence of the skitsza for the symphony Life! The first movement is all impulse, confidence..." which she considered to refer to the Symphony in E♭ major, but wrote that further on in this phrase the composer sets out the program for the future Sixth Symphony. This she called "certain turns in the dialectical development of the idea".

Irina Okhalova, a teacher of musical literature at the Academic Music College at the Moscow Conservatory, in her book Tchaikovsky's Works for Piano and Orchestra, attributes the title ‘Life’ to the Symphony in E♭ major and believes that the composer began working on the sketches for the symphony in the spring of 1891 during a tour to the USA. The composer Anton Safronov, who had experience in reconstructing symphonies by European composers of the 18th and 19th centuries, claimed in an article for the magazine Musical Life that Tchaikovsky worked on the Symphony in E♭ major from 1889 to 1892. In letters to those close to him, Safronov claims (he does not cite the source of his assertion) that Tchaikovsky "conventionally gave it the programme title Life". He writes, however, that "it is not entirely clear to us" which work Tchaikovsky had in mind—“the one he had already begun to write by that time but later abandoned, or the one that eventually became his great Sixth (Pathetique) Symphony. He writes that “it is not clear to us to the end".

In 2005, the Foundation of the Laureates of the International Tchaikovsky Competition and the State Memorial Music Museum-Reserve of P. I. Tchaikovsky in Klin commissioned composer and music teacher Pyotr Klimov to work on a new version of the reconstruction of the Symphony in E♭ major. There were two formal reasons for this. One was the new title Life proposed by the Foundation; the other was the intended three-movement structure of the symphony.

The Russian media reported that Tchaikovsky's Symphony in E♭ major, in Klimov's reconstruction, was first performed on 8 May 2006 at the Tchaikovsky Concert Hall in Moscow. It was performed in three movements, precisely with the subtitle Life. The conductor was Vasily Sinaisky. The performance of the Symphony in E♭ major by the State Academic Symphony Orchestra of Russia under Tomomi Nishimoto took place somewhat later, on 5 June 2006 in Klin. It was recorded on video and made freely available on YouTube. On 22 November 2013, the same version was performed on the stage of the St. Petersburg State Academic Capella at a concert as part of the Capella Symphony Orchestra subscription.

In the article Tchaikovsky's Unfinished Symphony — History and Modernity (2020), published after he had reconstructed the Symphony in the scientific journal Scientific Notes of the Gnesin Russian Academy of Music, Pyotr Klimov stated that "the E♭ major Symphony, composed in Klin in the spring and autumn of 1892, most likely has nothing to do with the project of the Symphony Life". He dated the outline of the Life Symphony itself to 1891.

== The symphony in foreign researchers' works ==
German musicologist Thomas Rainer published an article entitled Tchaikovsky's Symphony in E-flat Major and the Conception of the Life Symphony in the journal Neue Zeitschrift für Musik in 1967. He noted that both symphonies were written in the tonality E♭ major. The composer drew up a program and made note sketches for the Life Symphony, but later never returned to this idea. A researcher wondered whether Tchaikovsky used material from the Symphony Life when composing his later Symphony in E♭ major. Rainer found both "certain similarities" in the musical material of the first movements of both symphonies and "essential differences" between them. He concluded: "it can be assumed that Tchaikovsky, in a period 'without ideas and inclinations' (German: ohne Einfälle und Neigungen) (as he himself characterizes the time of composition of the E♭ major Symphony), returned to the earlier material of the Symphony Life". The American musicologist and emigrant from the USSR, Alexandra Orlova, in her monograph Tchaikovsky: Self-Portrait, published by Oxford University Press in 1980, limited herself to pointing out the difference between the intentions of the E♭ major Symphony and the Life Symphony.

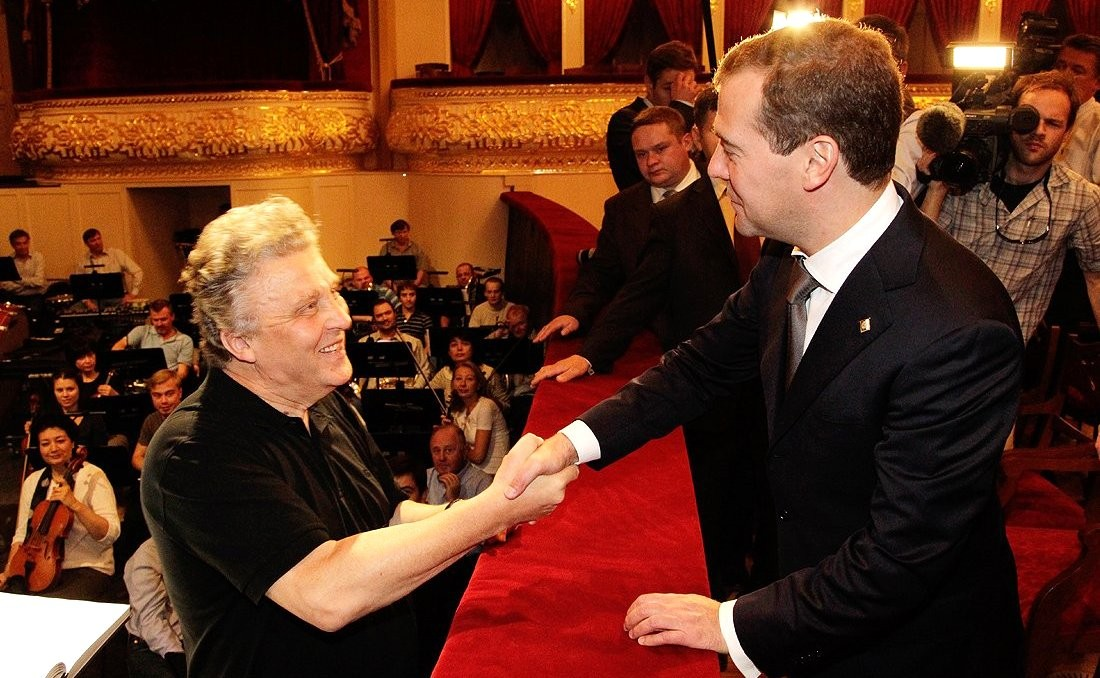
Vasily Sinaisky (left) in 2011

Some attention is paid to the Symphony Life (identifying it with the Symphony in E♭ major) by Galina Poberezhnaya, a doctor of art history and Ukrainian musicologist. In her opinion, the work on this piece is connected with Tchaikovsky's immersion "into his origins," and the work itself is autobiographical in nature. However, he refused to continue work on the Symphony, the concept of which, according to Poberezhnaya, might have seemed "too generalized" to the composer. She looked for the sources of his return to his past in the rapid aging and deterioration of the composer's health: "his hair thinned and turned completely gray, his face was covered with wrinkles, his teeth began to fall out, his eyesight weakened", "the turn to the prospect of his own old age and death in Tchaikovsky's consciousness was finally accomplished". From her point of view, Tchaikovsky understood that "the fading over the years of creative ability is inevitable, but it was frightening to admit that it had already come". Poberezhnaya considered the Life Symphony, of which only sketches remained, to be the first of Tchaikovsky's two attempts to end his artistic career. The second was the Sixth Symphony. The musicologist called the first movement of both symphonies a reflection of the beginning of the composer's life journey, but as "an image of flashed memories of childhood, memories born amidst painful, sorrowful thoughts".

Alexander Poznansky, the composer's American biographer, made no distinction between the conception of the Symphony Life and the composer's work on the Symphony in E♭ major and practically identified them. For him, it was all work on the Symphony—a reflection on the "general problems of existence." He returned to it constantly for a long time, although he was repeatedly forced to be distracted by the opera Iolanta and the ballet The Nutcracker. Poznansky attributed the fragment of text and musical notes traditionally associated with the sketches for this symphony to the composer's stay on board the steamship Bismarck in the spring of 1891.

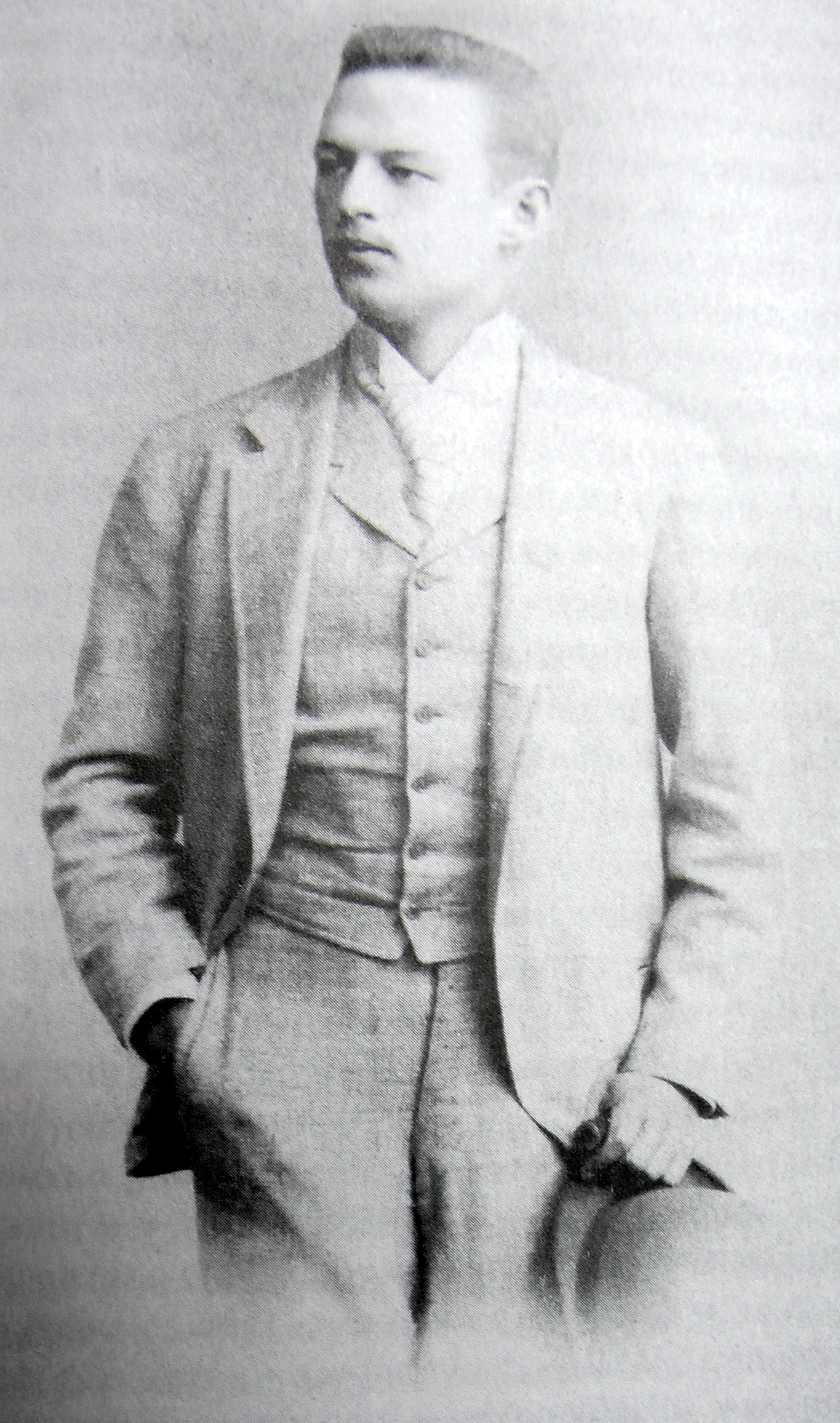
Vladimir Davydov in 1891

According to Poznansky, the composer twice started work on the Symphony Life: in 1892 and during his stay in Odessa at the very beginning of 1893. Poznansky attributed this return to Tchaikovsky's recent meeting with his former governess, Fanny Durbach, in the town of Montbéliard, near Basel. This encounter plunged Pyotr Ilyich into memories of his childhood and youth, intertwined with his love for his nephew, Vladimir Davidov, whom Poznansky characterizes as the composer's "immense, all-encompassing" and "last" love. Whereas the symphony had previously seemed abstract to Tchaikovsky, it now took on a deeply personal character. The biographer claimed that, in this symphony, the composer wanted to retell the story of his own life to his lover. From Poznansky's point of view, the return to the idea of the symphony abandonce was, in fact, the beginning of work on the future Sixth Symphony, which Tchaikovsky referred to in a letter to Vladimir Davidov as "a piece with a program," though he immediately specified that the program should remain a secret for listeners. The music of this work was so personal to the composer that he reportedly wept as he composed it.

Tchaikovsky's biographer Roland John Wiley connected the Symphony in E♭ major with textual and musical sketches on two undated sheets, presumably from the early 1890s, which scholars typically associate with the Life Symphony. Regarding these notes, Wiley argued that the exaggerated focus on programmatic elements in art criticism has diverted attention from the "poetic element" that lies at the heart of Tchaikovsky's symphonies. Citing Boris Asafiev, Wiley noted that the existence of a program for a musical work does not necessarily play a determining role in it. Work on The Queen of Spades distracted Tchaikovsky from the symphony he had conceived.

Another of Tchaikovsky's biographers, Anthony Holden, considered the sketches for the Symphony Life (which he relates to the time of the composer’s travels from the USA to Europe) to be the beginning of his work on the future Sixth Symphony. Holden calls the temporary abandonment of this project and the composition of the Symphony in E♭ major, which he contrasts with the Symphony Life as "false start". The biographer attributed Tchaikovsky’s return to the postponed project in February 1893 to his visit to his former governess, Fanny Durbach.

Thomas Kohlhase, Professor of Musicology at the Eberhard-Karl University of Tübingen, devoted his article, published on the international website Die Tschaikowsky-Gesellschaft, to collecting and summarizing data on the relationship between the E♭ major Symphony, the Third Piano Concerto, the Andante and Finale, and the Scherzo-Fantasie. The musicologist clearly separates the sketches for the E♭ major Symphony and the Life Symphony, although he notes that both ideas originated around the same time. He claims that the composer did not use material from the Life Symphony in the E♭ major Symphony.

Dr. Marina Ritsareva, a doctor of art history living in Israel, published a book in English in 2014 entitled Tchaikovsky's Pathetique [Symphony] and Russian Culture. In 2017, this book was published in Russian under the title The Mystery of Tchaikovsky's Pathetique (about the hidden program of the Sixth Symphony) in a significantly modified form, with changes affecting the illustrations, structure, and shortened explanations to the text. In the book, Ritsareva identifies the Symphony in E♭ major and the Life Symphony as the same work. Analyzing Tchaikovsky's approach to composing program music through a comparison of the intentions behind the Symphony in E♭ major Life and Manfred, Ritsareva described the symphony as embodying a "more ambitious philosophical idea", though she noted that this idea was "pretentious" and "illusory".

Noting the importance of Tchaikovsky's familiarity with the works of Ernest Renan for his late compositions (Renan died on October 2, 1892 — about a month and a half before the Symphony in E♭ major was destroyed), Ritsareva quoted a phrase from the French philosopher, clearly familiar to the composer: "Death brings perfection to the most perfect man; it frees him from all his faults in the eyes of those who loved him." Reflecting on Tchaikovsky's reasons for not completing this symphony, she wrote: "His unfinished and abandoned project, the Life Symphony, reflected his [Tchaikovsky's] search for his own model of ethos. At some point, it was as if he realized and came to terms with the fact that he had failed to create a classical symphony representing a model of "becoming himself" that he could believe in. The truth about the hero's life demanded the truth about his death, too, with all its human fear, suffering, and agony".

== In culture ==
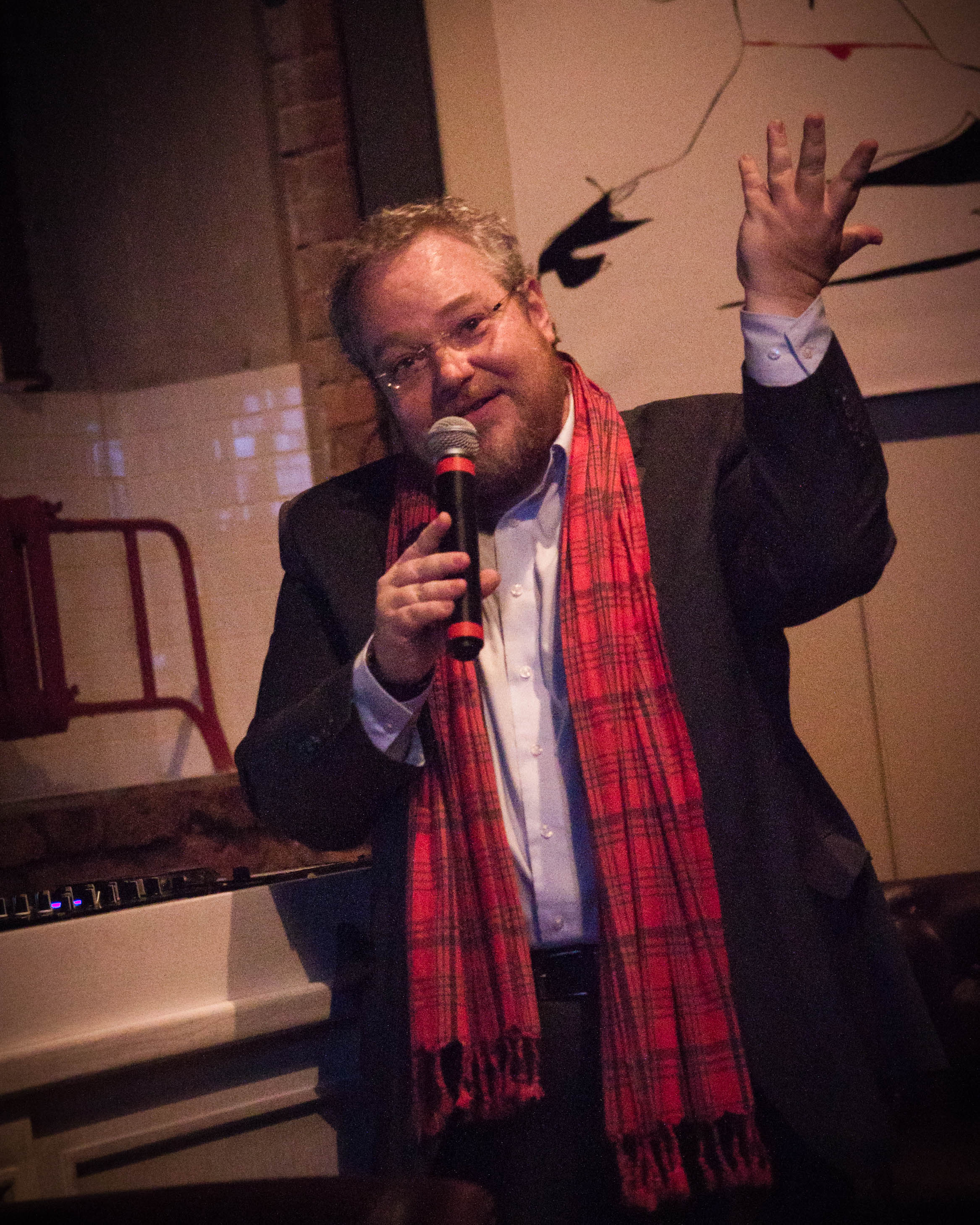
Artem Vargaftik at the opening of Way2Art in 2015

In 1990, Boris Nikitin, a shipbuilding engineer by training who devoted most of his life to working on biographies of Russian musicians, published his book Tchaikovsky. Old and New. He wrote that while the Sixth Symphony was composed by Tchaikovsky only in February–March 1893, the idea for a symphony reflecting the composer's life emerged earlier — in May 1891. Nikitin associates this idea with the outline of the program for the Life Symphony, which was never written. As examples of the similarity between the ideas of both symphonies, the author cited Tchaikovsky's notes on the Life Symphony: "The finale death is the result of destruction", and "the fourth [movement] ends with a faltering". Ironically, Nikitin wrote: "If one believes those who are inclined to regard the Sixth Symphony as a farewell to life before an intended suicide, then it turns out that this terrible act was conceived by Tchaikovsky more than two years before its accomplishment".

Russian music educator and popularizer of academic music Artyom Vargaftik prepared a TV program P. I. Tchaikovsky. Symphony Life (filmed by the TV company ‘Vector-Rus’ in 2008), in which he tells the story of the Symphony in E♭ major. In the finale of the program, Vargaftik declares that the question of identifying it with the Symphony Life can never be resolved. The TV program was shown on the Kultura channel and filmed at the Tchaikovsky Museum-Reserve in Klin. The program used music from the Third Piano Concerto and the Symphony in E♭ major in both existing reconstructions.

In 2020, the State Memorial Music Museum-Reserve of P. I. Tchaikovsky in Klin opened an updated exhibition Symphony Life. It was timed to the 180th anniversary of Tchaikovsky's birth. The exposition is presented to visitors for five years. The organizers reported that the purpose of the exhibition is “to reveal the mystery of Tchaikovsky's creative laboratory”. Among the items on display are personal belongings, photographs, books, documents, letters, diaries, and manuscripts of Tchaikovsky's works. Modern technologies and multimedia were used in the preparation of the exhibition. Despite its name, the exhibition Symphony Life is not related to the composer's work of the same name. The original version of the exhibition was opened back in 2015, prepared for Tchaikovsky's 175th anniversary. The curator of the exposition was art historian Polina Vaidman. The name was chosen by the art historian not by chance. Rossiyskaya Gazeta reported that in 1891 Tchaikovsky planned "to create a symphony with the symbolic title Life, which would summarize his entire creative journey," and made sketches for its program, which "represent a reflection of the composer's entire life: the impulse, thirst for activity, and love turn into disappointment and faltering”. Ada Ainbinder, head of the Foundation of Manuscript and Printed Sources of the Tchaikovsky House-Museum in Klin, became the curator of the updated exposition.

== Bibliography ==
=== Sources ===
- Tchaikovsky, P. I. (1923). 10 мая 1891 года // Дневники П. И. Чайковского. 1873—1891 [May 10, 1891 // Diaries of P. I. Tchaikovsky. 1873-1891]. Классики мировой музыкальной культуры (in Russian). М.—Пг.: Государственное издательство. Музыкальный сектор. p. 292.
- Tschaïkowsky, P. I. (2003). Neue Ausgabe sämtlicher Werke. Vol. 39c: Symphony no. 6 in B Minor: «Pathétique»; op. 74 (ČW 27). Critical report. Ed. by Thomas Kohlhase and Polina Vajdman [New edition of complete works. Vol. 39c: Symphony no. 6 in B Minor: “Pathétique”; op. 74 (ČW 27). Critical report. Ed. by Thomas Kohlhase and Polina Vajdman]. Series II: Orchestral works (in German). Mainz, Moskau: Verlagen Schott Music, Muzyka. p. 5.

=== Researches and non-fiction ===
- "Архив П. И. Чайковского в Доме-музее". Автографы П. И. Чайковского в архиве Дома-музея в Клину: Справочник [Autographs of P. I. Tchaikovsky in the archive of the House-Museum in Klinu: Reference book] (in Russian). Vol. 1: Автографы к музыкальным произведениям, Записные книжки и дневники. М.: Комитет по делам искусств при Совете министров СССР. Отделение научно-исследовательских учреждений. Государственный дом-музей П. И. Чайковского. 1950. pp. 3–6.
- Alshwang, А. А. (1970). "12. Творчество 1885—1893 годов". П. И. Чайковский [P. I. Tchaikovsky]. Классики мировой музыкальной культуры (in Russian). М.: Музыка. pp. 577–746.
- Alshwang, А. А. (1940). Последняя симфония Чайковского // Советская музыка: Журнал [Tchaikovsky's Last Symphony // Soviet Music: Journal] (in Russian). Vol. 5—6 (76). М.: Композитор. pp. 48–69. ISSN 2686-9284.
- Blok, V. M. (1972). "Восстановление Симфонии Es-dur Чайковского". С. С. Богатырёв. Статьи. Исследования. Воспоминания [S. S. Bogatyryov. Articles. Studies. Memories] (in Russian). М.: Советский композитор. pp. 214–237.
- Blok, V. M. (1970). На пути к «Патетической» // Советская музыка: Журнал [On the Way to “Pathetic” // Soviet Music: Journal] (in Russian). Vol. 9 (382). М.: Композитор. pp. 78–80. ISSN 2686-9284.
- Vaidman, P. E. (2003). "Слово Чайковского в рукописях его инструментальных произведений". Петербургский музыкальный архив: Сборник научных статей [St. Petersburg Musical Archive: Collection of Scientific Articles] (in Russian). Vol. 4. Чайковский. Новые документы и материалы. СПб.: Композитор. pp. 142–154. ISBN 5-7379-0215-3
- Vaidman, P. E. (1988). Творческий архив П. И. Чайковского [Creative Archive of P. I. Tchaikovsky]. Документальное научное издание (in Russian). М.: Музыка. p. 175.
- Dolzhansky, А. N. (1981). "Шестая симфония («Патетическая»)". Симфоническая музыка Чайковского: Избранные произведения [Tchaikovsky's Symphonic Music: Selected Works] (in Russian). Л.: Музыка. pp. 183–206.
- Keldysh, Yu. V. (1994). "П. И. Чайковский". История русской музыки [The History of Russian Music] (in Russian). Vol. 8. 70—80-е XIX годы века. Part II. М.: Музыка. pp. 89–245. ISBN 5-7140-0588-0
- Klimov, P. A. (2020). "Неоконченная симфония Чайковского — история и современность". Учёные записки Российской академии музыки имени Гнесиных [Учёные записки Российской академии музыки имени Гнесиных] (in Russian). Vol. 1 (32). М.: Российская академия музыки им. Гнесиных ISSN 2227-9997. pp. 5–20.
- Kremlyov, Yu. A. Симфонии П. И. Чайковского (1955). "Шестая симфония". Симфонии П. И. Чайковского [Symphonies by P. I. Tchaikovsky] (in Russian). М.: Государственное музыкальное издательство. pp. 241–295.
- Moiseev, G. А. (2009). "Струнный секстет «Воспоминание о Флоренции» в контексте позднего периода творчества". Камерные ансамбли П. И. Чайковского [Tchaikovsky's chamber ensembles] (in Russian). М.: Музыка. pp. 206–248. ISBN 978-5-7140-1169-6.
- Nikitin, B. S. (1990). Чайковский. Старое и новое [Tchaikovsky. Old and new] (in Russian). М.: Знание. ISBN 5-07-000670-3
- Nikolayeva, N. S. (1958). "Шестая симфония («Патетическая»)". Симфонии П. И. Чайковского: От «Зимних грёз» к «Патетической» [Tchaikovsky's Symphonies: From “Winter Dreams” to “Pathetique”] (in Russian). М.: Государственное музыкальное издательство. pp. 205–264.
- Okhalova, I. V. (2018). "Третий концерт / Анданте и Финал". Произведения П. И. Чайковского для фортепиано с оркестром [Works by P. I. Tchaikovsky for Piano and Orchestra]. Инструментальные концерты П. И. Чайковского (in Russian). М.: Музыкальное издательство «П. Юргенсон». pp. 83–93 / 94–109. ISBN 978-5-9720-0103-3.
- Poberezhnaya, G. I. (1994). Пётр Ильич Чайковский [Pyotr Ilych Tchaikovsky] (in Russian). Киев: Рос. мовою. p. 358. ISBN 5-8238-0156-4.
- Poznansky, A. N. (2009). Пётр Чайковский. Биография. В 2-х томах [Peter Tchaikovsky. Biography. In 2 volumes.]. Жизнеописания (in Russian). Vol. 2. СПб.: Вита Нова. p. 624.
- Rozanova, Yu. A. (1981). "Шестая симфония". История русской музыки [History of Russian Music] (in Russian). Vol. II. Вторая половина XIX века. Книга III. П. И. Чайковский. М.: Музыка. pp. 119–141.
- Ruchyevskaya, E. A. (1978). "Последние годы". Пётр Ильич Чайковский. Краткий очерк жизни и творчества [Pyotr Ilyich Tchaikovsky. A brief sketch of life and work] (in Russian). Л.: Музыка. pp. 94–110.
- Safronov, А. (2019). "Симфонии ми-бемоль мажор". Музыкальная жизнь: Журнал [Musical Life: A Journal] (in Russian). М.: Композитор.
- Tumanina, N. V. (1968). П. И. Чайковский [P. I. Tchaikovsky] (in Russian). Vol. Великий мастер. 1878—1893. М.: Наука. p. 487.
- Tsagareyshvili, S. A. (2020). В музее-заповеднике Клину к 180-летию Чайковского обновили экспозицию: Альманах [The museum-reserve in Klinu updated its exposition for Tchaikovsky's 180th anniversary: Almanac] (in Russian). М.: Правительство Российской Федерации. ISSN 1606-5484.
- Khazdan, E. V.; Rytsaryeva, M. G. (2018). Тайна Патетической Чайковского (о скрытой программе Шестой симфонии) [The Mystery of Tchaikovsky's Pathetique (on the hidden program of the Sixth Symphony)] (in Russian). М.: Opera musicologica: Журнал. pp. 114–122. ISSN 2075-4078.
- Kholden, A. (2003). Пётр Чайковский [Pyotr Tchaikovsky]. Русские биографии (in Russian). М.: Эксмо. p. 672. ISBN 5-699-04129-X
- His final symphony, according to the master's plan. The Sydney Morning Herald. 2005.
- Orlova, A. A. (1990). Tchaikovsky. A self-portrait. Oxford, New York.: Oxford University Press. p. 436. ISBN 978-0-1931-5319-6.
- Rainer, T. (1967). Tschaikowskys Es-Dur-Sinfonie und Idee einer Simfonie «Das Leben» [Tchaikovsky's Symphony in E flat major and idea for a symphony “Life”] (in German). Mainz: Neue Zeitschrift für Musik: Журнал. pp. 160–162. ISSN 0945-6945.
- Ritzarev, М. (2014). "Secrecy / Afterword". Tchaikovsky's Pathétique and Russian culture. Burlington: Ashgate Publishing limited. pp. 1–8 / 151–156. ISBN 978-1-4724-2411-2.
- Wiley, R. J. (2009). Tchaikovsky. The Master Musicians. Oxford: Oxford University Press. p. 592. ISBN 978-0195-3689-25.

=== Manuals ===
- "Автографы к музыкальным произведениям". Автографы П. И. Чайковского в архиве Дома-музея в Клину: Справочник [Autographs of P. I. Tchaikovsky in the archive of the House-Museum in Klinu: Reference book] (in Russian). Vol. 1. Автографы к музыкальным произведениям, Записные книжки и дневники. М.: Комитет по делам искусств при Совете министров СССР. Отделение научно-исследовательских учреждений. Государственный дом-музей П. И. Чайковского. 1950. pp. 7–77.
- Орлова, Давыдова (1958). Музыкальное наследие П. И. Чайковского: Из истории его произведений [The Musical Heritage of P. I. Tchaikovsky: From the History of his Works] (in Russian). М.: Издательство Академии наук СССР. p. 542.
- "Symphony E Flat major". Thematic and Bibliographical Catalogue of P. I. Tchaikovsky's (P. I. Čajkovskij's) Works. Prepared by P. I. Tchaikovsky Scientific and Publishing Board with the assistance of State Institute of Art Studies (Moscow), Tchaikovsky House Museum (Klin) and M. I. Glinka State Central Museum of Musical Culture (Moscow). Ed. P. E. Vajdman, L. Z. Korabel'nikova, V. V. Rubcova. М.: P. Jurgenson Music Publishing House. 2006. pp. 780–782. ISBN 5-9720-0001-6
