= Human life =

Human life may refer to:

- Human life span, statistical measure of the average time a human being is expected to live
- Human Life Amendment, various proposals to amend the United States Constitution to prohibit abortion
- Human Life International, an American-based Roman Catholic activist anti-abortion organization
- The Human Life Review, a quarterly journal devoted to explorations of life issues, primarily abortion

== See also ==
- Human, primates of the family Hominidae, and the only extant species of the genus Homo
- Human (disambiguation)
- Life (disambiguation)
- My Life (disambiguation)
- Vita (disambiguation)
- Meaning of life, questions pertaining to the significance of living or existence in general
- Personal life, the course of an individual's life
- Everyday life, the ways in which people typically act, think, and feel on a daily basis
- Human condition, the characteristics and key events that compose the essentials of human existence
- Human rights, principles or norms that describe certain standards of human behaviour and are regularly protected by law
- Beginning of human personhood, the moment when a human is first recognized as a person
- Biography, a detailed description or account of a person's life
- Autobiography, a self-written account of the life of oneself
