= 一生 =

一生, meaning "life", may refer to:

- Issei, Japanese masculine given name
- Kazuki, Japanese masculine given name
  - Kazuki Sakai (阪井 一生, born 1985), Japanese guitar in the band Flumpool
- Kazuo, Japanese masculine given name
  - Kazuo Mori (森 一生, 1911 – 1989), Japanese film director

== See also ==
- Life (disambiguation)
- 一生一世 (disambiguation)
