= Life FM (South Africa) =

South Africa
- Broadcast area: North West
- Frequency: 100.6 MHz

History
- First air date: December 2012

Life FM (also Life FM 100.6FM) is a South African registered Non Profit Company (NPC) Christian community radio station based in the North West.

The station was granted a broadcasting licence from ICASA

== Coverage areas and frequencies ==
In the Matlosana area. 25 km radius from Klerspdorp (checked April 2013), with an aim to get a 70 km radius.

== Broadcast languages ==
- English (70%)
- Afrikaans (20%)
- Tswana (10%)

== Programme format ==
- 60% Music
- 40% Talk
