= Life on Earth =

Life on Earth may refer to:

== Science ==
- Life
- Earliest known life forms
- Evolutionary history of life
  - Abiogenesis

== Film and television ==
- Life on Earth (film) (La Vie Sur Terre), a 1998 Malian film
- Life on Earth (TV series), a 1979 British nature documentary series

== Music ==
- Life on Earth (Musiq Soulchild album) or the title song, 2016
- Life on Earth (Renee Rosnes album), 2001
- Life on Earth (Tiny Vipers album) or the title song, 2009
- Life on Earth (Hurray for the Riff Raff album) or the title song, 2022
- Life on Earth, an EP by Summer Walker, 2020
- "Life on Earth", a song by Band of Horses from The Twilight Saga: Eclipse film soundtrack, 2010
- "Life on Earth", a song by Dala from Best Day
- "Life on Earth", a song by Snow Patrol from Wildness, 2018

== See also ==
- Live on Earth (disambiguation)
- Living on Earth, a United States radio news program
- Life of Earth, a book by Indian science writer Sukanya Datta
