= Life, the universe and everything =

Life, the universe and everything may refer to:

- A phrase from The Hitchhiker's Guide to the Galaxy by Douglas Adams
- Life, the Universe and Everything, the third book in the Hitchhiker's Guide to the Galaxy series
- Life, the Universe, & Everything (symposium), an annual academic science fiction symposium held in the USA
