= Creature! =

Japanese manga series

- First tankōbon volume cover

ハカイジュウ (Hakaijū)
- Genre: Horror, science fiction
- Manga
- Written by: Shingo Honda
- Published by: Akita Shoten
- English publisher: NA: Media Do (digital)
- Magazine: Monthly Shōnen Champion
- Original run: April 6, 2010 – June 6, 2017
- Volumes: 21

Creature! (Japanese: ハカイジュウ, Hepburn: Hakaijū) is a Japanese manga series written and illustrated by Shingo Honda. It was serialized in Monthly Shōnen Champion from April 2010 to June 2017 and published in 21 volumes.

== Media ==
=== Manga ===
Written and illustrated by Shingo Honda, the series began serialization in Monthly Shōnen Champion on April 6, 2010. The series completed its serialization on June 6, 2017. The series' individual chapters were collected into 21 tankōbon volumes.

Media Do published the series in English digitally.

==== Volume list ====
No.	Release date	ISBN
1	August 6, 2010	978-4-25-320424-8
2	November 8, 2010	978-4-25-320425-5
3	March 8, 2011	978-4-25-320426-2
4	July 8, 2011	978-4-25-320427-9
5	November 8, 2011	978-4-25-320428-6
6	March 8, 2012	978-4-25-320429-3
7	July 6, 2012	978-4-25-320449-1
8	November 8, 2012	978-4-25-320450-7
9	March 8, 2013	978-4-25-320451-4
10	July 8, 2013	978-4-25-320452-1
11	November 8, 2013	978-4-25-320459-0
12	March 7, 2014	978-4-25-320460-6
13	July 8, 2014	978-4-25-320468-2
14	March 6, 2015	978-4-25-320469-9
15	July 8, 2015	978-4-25-320470-5
16	November 6, 2015	978-4-25-322671-4
17	March 8, 2016	978-4-25-322672-1
18	July 8, 2016	978-4-25-322673-8
19	November 8, 2016	978-4-25-322674-5
20	March 8, 2017	978-4-25-322675-2
21	July 7, 2017	978-4-25-322676-9

=== Other media ===
A two-minute live action short was produced to commemorate the release of the seventh volume. It was created by Hajime Ohata and Kiyotaka Taguchi.

== Reception ==
The reviewers for Anime News Network offered praise to the artwork and concept of the series, while also criticizing the plot as generic and uninspired. Koiwai from Manga News had similar feelings, praising the artwork and criticizing the plot as generic.

The series has sold over one million copies.
