= Life (Sadava book) =

Life, by David E. Sadava et al., is a 1983 biological science textbook, under continual revision, used at many colleges and universities around the United States of America. As of 2024, it is in its twelfth edition. It is published by W.H. Freeman through MacMillan Learning.
