= Creature of statute =

Corporation or entity created by statutory law

A creature of statute (also known as creature of the state) is a legal entity, such as a corporation, created by statute. Creatures of statute may include municipalities and other artificial legal entities or relationships. Thus, when a statute in some fashion requires the formation of a corporate body—often for governmental purposes—such bodies when formed are known as "creatures of statute." The same concept is also expressed with the phrase "creature of the state."

In statutory construction, a "creature of the state shall have the same duties, and that its funds shall have the same liabilities, as the general law would impose on a private person doing the same thing."

The term "creature of statute" is most common to the United States. In the United Kingdom, these bodies are simply called statutory corporations (or statutory bodies) and generally have some governmental function. The United Kingdom Atomic Energy Authority is an example. In a wider sense, most companies in the UK are created under statute since the Companies Act 1985 specifies how a company may be created by a member of the public, but these companies are not called 'statutory corporations'. Often, in American legal and business documents that speak of governing bodies (e.g., a board that governs small businesses in China) these bodies are described as "creatures of statute" to inform readers of their origins and format although the national governments that created them may not term them as creatures of statute. Australia also uses the term "creature of statute" to describe some governmental bodies.

== See also ==
- Competition regulator
- Statutory authority
- Regulatory agency
- Independent agencies of the United States government
- Public Authority
- Quango
