= Under Secretary of Veterans Affairs for Health =

US sub-cabinet government official

Department of Veterans Affairs Under Secretary for Health (USH)
- Agency seal

- Personal flag of the under secretary of veterans affairs

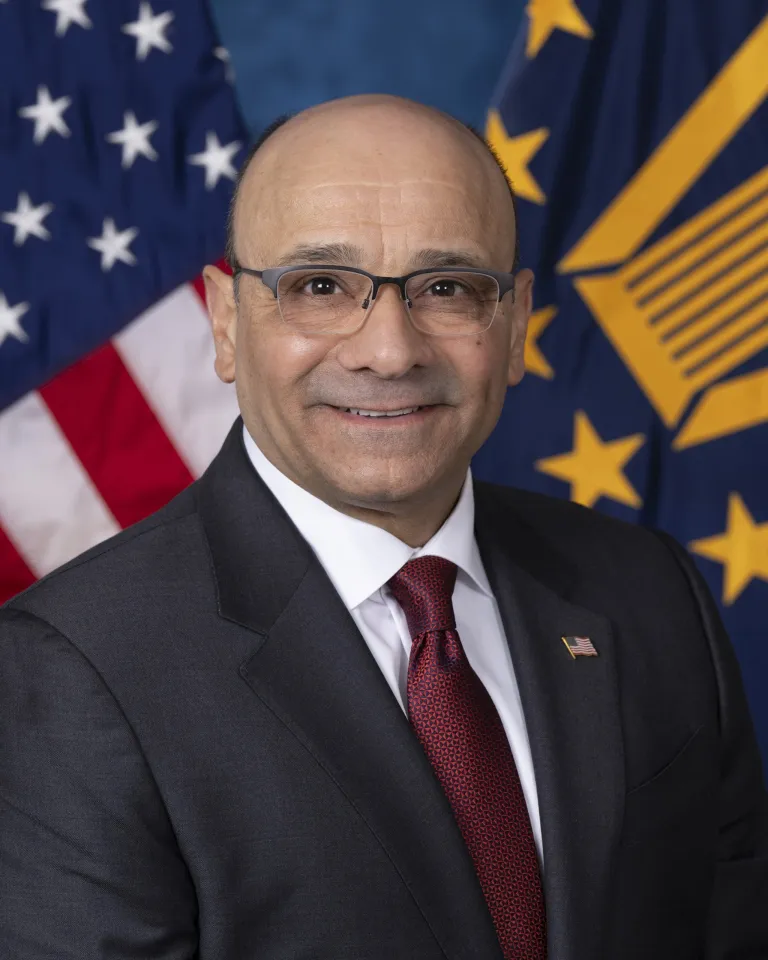
- Incumbent; John Figueroa; Acting since July 6, 2026
- Veterans Health Administration
- Reports to: Secretary of Veterans Affairs
- Seat: Washington, D.C.
- Appointer: The president; with Senate advice and consent
- Constituting instrument: 38 U.S.C. § 305
- Precursor: Chief Medical Director of the Veterans’ Administration (1991)
- Deputy: Principal Deputy Undersecretary of Veterans Affairs for Health
- Website: Official website

The under secretary of veterans affairs for health is a sub-cabinet position in the United States Department of Veterans Affairs. Formerly known as the chief medical director of veterans health, the undersecretary is the highest official directly responsible to the secretary for the Veterans Health Administration, which is the largest agency within the department. Although the position is no longer required to be held by a licensed physician (as of 2004), senior medical professionals such as hospital administrators are typically the preferred selectee for nomination, based on both demonstrated ability in the medical profession or health care administration, and with substantial experience in Veterans healthcare or similar programs.

From 2017 through July 2022, the position was vacant, with the last Senate-confirmed holder being Dr. David Shulkin, who was elevated to become the secretary on February 14, 2017. As was the norm during much of the Trump administration, the position was filled by a myriad persons designated as acting undersecretary. Between 2018 and 2021, the position was held by Dr. Richard Stone, MD. Following his resignation in July 2021, Deputy Under Secretary Dr. Steven. L. Lieberman assumed his duties. On March 19, 2022, President Biden announced his intention to nominate Dr. Shereef Elnahal to serve as undersecretary. Dr. Elnahal was confirmed by the Senate on July 21, 2022 and assumed his office the same day.

== List of undersecretaries for health ==
Undersecretary	Term of office		
Portrait	Name	Assumed office	Left office
	James W. Holsinger, Jr., MD	March 15, 1990	September 27, 1994
	Kenneth W. Kizer, M.D., MPH	September 28, 1994	September 7, 2000
	Thomas L. Garthwaite, MD	September 8, 2000	March 21, 2002
	Robert H. Roswell, MD	March 22, 2002	April 6, 2004
	Jonathan Perlin M.D, PhD, MSHA, FACP	April 6, 2004 as Acting Undersecretary	April 28, 2005
	Jonathan Perlin M.D, PhD, MSHA, FACP	April 28, 2005	August 11, 2006
	Matthew J. Kussman MD, MS, MACP	August 12, 2006 as Acting Undersecretary	March 25, 2007
	Matthew J. Kussman MD, MS, MACP	March 25, 2007	May 9, 2009
	Gerald Cross, MD	May 10, 2009 as Acting Undersecretary	February 17, 2010
	Robert Petzel, MD	February 18, 2010 (Note: Dr. Petzel was confirmed by the Senate on February 11, 2010.)	May 16, 2014
	Robert L. Jesse, M.D., Ph.D	May 16, 2014 as Principal Deputy Undersecretary	July 2, 2014
	Carolyn M. Clancy, M.D.	July 2, 2014 as Interim Undersecretary	June 23, 2015
	David Shulkin, MD	June 23, 2015	February 14, 2017
	Poonam Alaigh, M.D.	February 14, 2017 as Acting Undersecretary	October 7, 2017
	Carolyn M. Clancy, M.D.	October 7, 2017 as Acting Undersecretary	July 16, 2018
	Richard A. Stone, M.D.	July 16, 2018 as VHA Executive in Charge	July 17, 2021
	Steven L. Lieberman M.D, FACHE, FACP, MSA	July 17, 2021 as Acting Under Secretary	July 21, 2022
	Shereef Elnahal	July 21, 2022	January 20, 2025
	Steven L. Lieberman M.D, FACHE, FACP, MSA	January 20, 2025 as Acting Under Secretary	November 14, 2025
John Figueroa	John Figueroa	November 14, 2025 as Senior Advisor, Performing the Duties of Under Secretary	January 9, 2026
	John Bartrum	January 9, 2026	July 6, 2026
John Figueroa, Acting Under Secretary for Health	John Figueroa	July 6, 2026 as Senior Advisor, Acting Under Secretary	Present
