= Judith Persichilli =

American nurse and health care executive

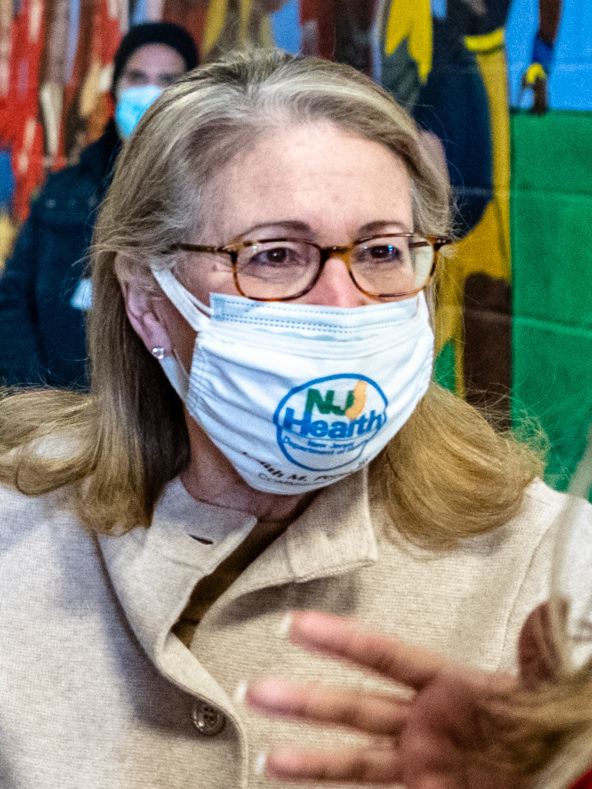

22nd Commissioner of New Jersey Department of Health
- In office July 2019 – August 2023
- Governor: Phil Murphy
- Preceded by: Shereef Elnahal
- Succeeded by: Kaitlan Baston (acting)

Personal details
- Born: March 4, 1949 (age 77) New Brunswick, New Jersey, U.S.
- Party: Democratic
- Education: St. Francis Hospital School of Nursing; Rutgers University(B.S.); Rider College

Judith Persichilli (born March 4, 1949) is an American nurse and health care executive who was the 22nd Commissioner of the New Jersey Department of Health for the State of New Jersey. Prior to that position, she was interim president/CEO of University Hospital in Newark.

== Early life and education ==
Perschilli was born in New Brunswick, New Jersey. Her father worked in a leather goods factory and her mother was a legal secretary. Perschilli was one of four children. She has a twin sister, an older sister, and a younger brother. She grew up in Dunellen, New Jersey. The family was Catholic. Perschilli and her siblings attended Saint Peter’s High School, a Catholic high school in New Brunswick.

Persichilli received her nursing diploma from the St. Francis Hospital School of Nursing in 1968. She graduated from Rutgers University in 1976 with a bachelor of science in nursing, summa cum laude. She attained a master of arts in administration, summa cum laude, from Rider College in 1980.

== Career ==
=== Health care ===
Perschilli began her career as an intensive care nurse.

Persichilli was Chief Executive Officer and President of Catholic Health East. She also was Interim Chief Executive Officer of CHE Trinity Health until November 18, 2013. She was Executive Vice President and of Acute Care at Catholic Health East. Persichilli was the President of St Francis Medical Center in Trenton for eight years. She was Executive Vice President, Northeast Division of Catholic Health East.

=== Awards, positions, and titles ===
Persichilli is one of the founding members of the New Jersey Health Care Quality Institute. She is Director Emeritus of Hopewell Valley Community Bank. She is a Trustee of Rider University.

Persichilli was inducted into the New Jersey State Nurses Association Hall of Honor in 2006 in September, 2008, she received the Catholic Charities, Richard J. Hughes Humanitarian Award, Diocese of Trenton’s highest honor. She was named as one of the 50 most powerful people in New Jersey health care by NJBiz in March 2011. In May, 2011, she received the Edward J. Ill Excellence in Medicine Award for Outstanding Medical Executive.

She received an honorary doctor of health degree from Georgian Court University in 2009. In 2011, she was awarded an honorary doctor of humane letters from Sacred Heart University (Fairfield, Connecticut).

=== Murphy administration ===
Governor of New Jersey Phil Murphy appointed Persichilli to direct the University Hospital in Newark in December 2018. In June 2019, he announced that she would join the cabinet of the Murphy administration as Commissioner of the New Jersey Department of Health in July 2019.

Perschilli sought to expand gun violence treatment programs.

Persichilli supervised the state's response to COVID-19 pandemic, reporting the number of positive tests and deaths daily. When asked about her personal risk she said, “I’m definitely going to get it. We all are. I’m just waiting.” In an anonymous letter to the leaders of the New Jersey Legislature, employees of the health department said mishandling of the crisis led to many preventable deaths and called for Persichilli's resignation.

Perschilli announced her resignation in July 2023.

== Personal life ==
She married Anthony Persichilli. He was the mayor of Pennington for 12 years. He died in 2019 after 49 years of marriage.
