= David Shulkin =

9th United States Secretary of Veterans Affairs (born 1959)

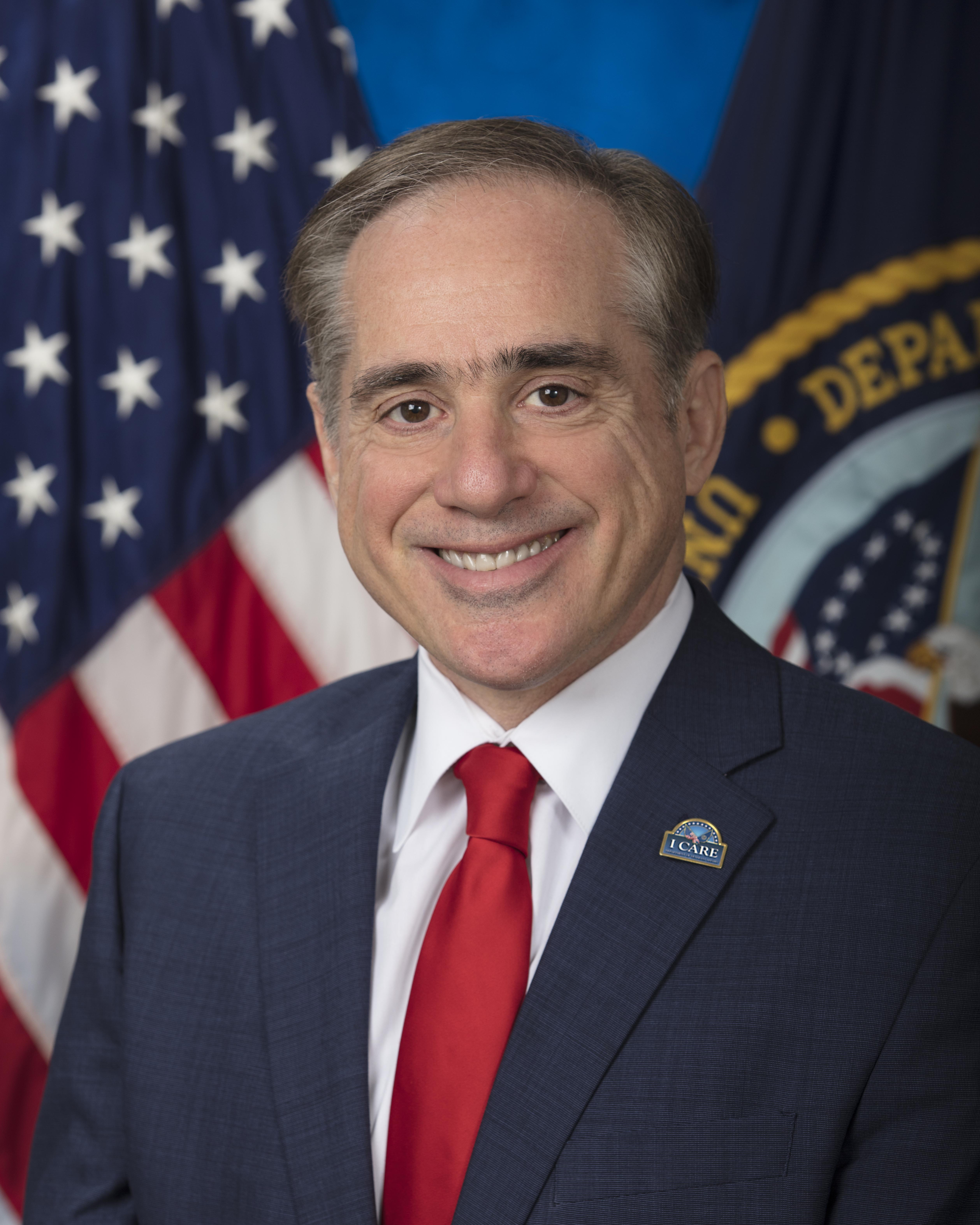
- Official portrait, 2017

9th United States Secretary of Veterans Affairs
- In office February 14, 2017 – March 28, 2018
- President: Donald Trump
- Deputy: Thomas G. Bowman
- Preceded by: Bob McDonald
- Succeeded by: Robert Wilkie

11th Under Secretary of Veterans Affairs for Health
- In office July 6, 2015 – February 13, 2017
- President: Barack Obama; Donald Trump
- Preceded by: Robert Petzel
- Succeeded by: Shereef Elnahal (2022)

Personal details
- Born: David Jonathon Shulkin; July 22, 1959 (age 67) Highland Park, Illinois, U.S.
- Party: Independent
- Spouse: Merle Bari
- Children: 2
- Education: Hampshire College (BA); Drexel University (MD)

David Jonathon Shulkin (born July 22, 1959) is an American physician who served as the United States secretary of veterans affairs from 2017 to 2018 under President Donald Trump, after serving as the under secretary of veterans affairs for health from 2015 to 2017, under President Barack Obama. On March 28, 2018, Trump dismissed Shulkin from his position by tweet, and announced that Physician to the President Ronny Jackson would be nominated as Shulkin's successor. (Jackson's nomination was withdrawn a month later.)

== Early life and education ==
David Shulkin was born July 22, 1959, to Jewish parents Mark Weiss Shulkin and Sonya Lee Shulkin (née Edelman), at the Fort Sheridan U.S. Army base in Highland Park, Illinois, where his father was an Army psychiatrist. Both of his grandfathers fought in World War I.

Shulkin earned a B.A. from Hampshire College in Massachusetts in 1982, followed by an M.D. degree from the Medical College of Pennsylvania (which has since merged into Drexel University) in 1986. He then did his medical internship at Yale School of Medicine, and his residency and fellowship in General Medicine at the University of Pittsburgh's Presbyterian Medical Center. He was a Robert Wood Johnson Foundation Clinical Scholar at the University of Pennsylvania.

== Career ==
Shulkin specialized in health care management. He has been described as one of the "high priests" of patient centered care. Shulkin was the President and chief executive officer of Beth Israel Medical Center in New York City. While there, Shulkin would walk the wards after midnight after he discovered the night shift was providing a lower quality of care. He also was president of Morristown Medical Center and as vice president of Atlantic Health System Accountable Care Organization.

He was the first Chief Medical Officer of the University of Pennsylvania Hospital and later at the University of Pennsylvania Health System, Temple University Hospital, and the Medical College of Pennsylvania Hospital.

His other academic positions have included Chairman of Medicine and Vice Dean at Drexel University College of Medicine, and Professor of Medicine at Albert Einstein College of Medicine. Shulkin has been the editor of Journal of Clinical Outcomes Management and Hospital Physician, and has been on the editorial boards of several journals, including Journal of the American Medical Association. He founded and served as the chairman and CEO of DoctorQuality, Inc., a consumer-oriented information service.

Shulkin has written several peer-reviewed journal articles and other professional publications. In 1999, Shulkin started a pay for performance company called DoctorQuality, which ultimately failed.

== Veterans Affairs ==
In 2015, Shulkin left the private sector when he was named by President Barack Obama as Under Secretary of Veterans Affairs for Health in the United States Department of Veterans Affairs (VA). When his staff told him it would take ten months to organize a summit on combat veteran suicides, Shulkin told them that during the wait 6,000 veterans would die and to get it done in one month, which they then did.

On January 11, 2017, Shulkin was nominated by President-elect Donald Trump as United States Secretary of Veterans Affairs. Trump, who had first considered five others, nominated Shulkin after a recommendation by Ambassador David M. Friedman. On February 13, 2017, the United States Senate unanimously confirmed Shulkin as the U.S. Secretary of Veterans Affairs in a 100–0 vote, making him the only cabinet nominee by President Trump to have unanimous consent in his first term. He was the first non-veteran to hold the position. In this position, Shulkin oversaw the government's second-largest agency, with over 350,000 employees and 1,700 facilities. Shulkin hoped to increase reliance on private health care for routine procedures, like hearing aids, so the department could focus on its core mission of caring for the wounded.

For President Trump's address to a joint session of Congress on February 28, 2017, Shulkin was the designated survivor in the line of succession of the president.

In April 2017, Shulkin had every VA hospital and clinic begin publicly posting quality data and wait times. He wanted to provide those with a less than honorable military discharge with free mental health care.

In May 2017, behind closed doors, Shulkin asked his VA healthcare directors to get rid of in-house optometry and audiology services to veterans—instead farming out those services to private community care.

In early July 2017, Shulkin announced that any settlement with an employee will require the approval of the undersecretary, assistant secretary or equivalent senior-level official. This effectively stopped all settlements. Lawyer Debra D'Agostino said that this will increase litigation against the VA and taxpayers will be paying for the VA's defense of itself and any illegal actions of its leadership. D'Agostino also said that federal agencies found liable for discrimination or whistleblower retaliation are not penalized as severely as private companies as compensatory damages are limited and there are no punitive damages available.

On March 28, 2018, Trump announced on Twitter that Shulkin had been fired and would be replaced by appointee Robert Wilkie in the interim. Trump also announced that Rear Admiral Ronny Jackson would be nominated to replace Shulkin.

=== Privatization of VA healthcare ===
Following his dismissal in March 2018, Shulkin highlighted the political pressure from the Trump White House to dismantle VA healthcare and send veterans to the private sector. In a New York Times editorial, Shulkin warned that "privatization is a political issue aimed at rewarding select people and companies with profits, even if it undermines care for veterans." Much of the political push to privatize VA healthcare comes from the political advocacy group Concerned Veterans of America (CVA), which was backed by Charles and David Koch. Privatization of VA healthcare is overwhelmingly opposed by veterans and veteran service organizations (VSO). Political aides assigned to VA, including John Ullyot, Camilo J. Sandoval and Jake Leinenkugel, battled with Shulkin over the issue and advocated for his removal in an effort to coerce him to support privatization. Shulkin's removal as head of the VA renewed concerns among veterans that the Trump administration would privatize VA healthcare.

=== European trip controversy ===
In September 2017, The Washington Post reported that Shulkin spent nearly half his time on a July 2017 international trip to Europe—which was paid for by taxpayers—sightseeing and shopping with his wife, Merle Bari. Shulkin later told The Washington Post that he did "nothing inappropriate" on the trip, that the trip was taken primarily to attend a Five Eyes conference, and that personal visits to "various historic and other sites in London and in Denmark" were done "on nights, on weekends, the day before the conference started" and were "paid for by me".

In February 2018, a report by Michael J. Missal, the Inspector General of Veterans Affairs, concluded that Shulkin's staff had misled both the agency's ethics officials and the public about the nature of the eleven-day trip. The report said that Shulkin's chief of staff, Vivieca Wright Simpson, had altered emails and had made false statements to make it look like Shulkin was receiving a Danish government award to justify his wife accompanying him on the taxpayer-funded trip. The Veterans Administration had paid over $4,300 for her airfare. The Inspector General said that the overall expense for the trip was at least $122,334. The report also said that Shulkin had inappropriately accepted tickets to Wimbledon worth thousands of dollars and had directed an aide to act as a "personal travel concierge" for the trip. The Inspector General referred his concerns about the potential criminality of the actions undertaken by Shulkin's chief of staff to the Department of Justice, which declined to prosecute.

In an interview with National Public Radio the day after his dismissal, Shulkin said that the Secretary of Veterans Affairs has been invited to this conference for decades and that he gave three different lectures at this particular conference. Shulkin reiterated that the personal trips were taken outside the time of the conference was held. He said that the only expense incurred by his wife that was paid by the federal government was for her economy class airfare, which had been approved in advance. When the airfare expense was later questioned, Shulkin said he reimbursed the federal government for the cost. He also said that prior to his dismissal the Trump Administration had forbidden him from speaking to the media to respond to the accusations publicly. The VA Inspector General report found no evidence that Shulkin was ever aware of the actions alleged to have been taken by the Chief of Staff. Furthermore, an internal VA Committee that reviewed the matter concluded that "there was no indication of fraud, misrepresentation or bad faith", on the part of Shulkin.

== Personal life ==
Shulkin is married to Merle Bari, a dermatologist. They have two children.

== Published works ==
External videos
- After Words interview with Shulkin on It Shouldn't Be This Hard to Serve Your Country, November 2, 2019, C-SPAN

- Shulkin, David J., M.D. (2008). Questions Patients Need to Ask: Getting the Best Healthcare. Xlibris, Corp. ISBN 978-1436367592.
- Shulkin, David J., M.D. (2019). It Shouldn't Be This Hard to Serve Your Country: Our Broken Government and the Plight of Veterans. PublicAffairs. ISBN 1541762657.

== Awards and honors ==
- Senior Fellow at the Leonard Davis Institute in Health Economics at the University of Pennsylvania.
- Robert Wood Johnson Foundation Clinical Scholar at the University of Pennsylvania.
- National Health Policy Fellow, U.S. Senate Committee on Aging
- Named one of the country's top Health care leaders for the next century by Modern Healthcare,
- Named One of the Hundred Most Powerful in Healthcare (ranked #86) by Modern Healthcare (2008).

== See also ==
- List of Jewish United States Cabinet members

Political offices
Preceded by Robert Petzel	Under Secretary of Veterans Affairs for Health; 2015–2017	Succeeded by Poonam Alaigh; Acting
Preceded by Bob McDonald	United States Secretary of Veterans Affairs; 2017–2018	Succeeded by Robert Wilkie
U.S. order of precedence (ceremonial)
Preceded by Steve Mnuchin as Former U.S. Cabinet Member	Order of precedence of the United States as Former U.S. Cabinet Member	Succeeded by Wilbur Ross as Former U.S. Cabinet Member
