= Shereef Elnahal =

American physician (born 1985)

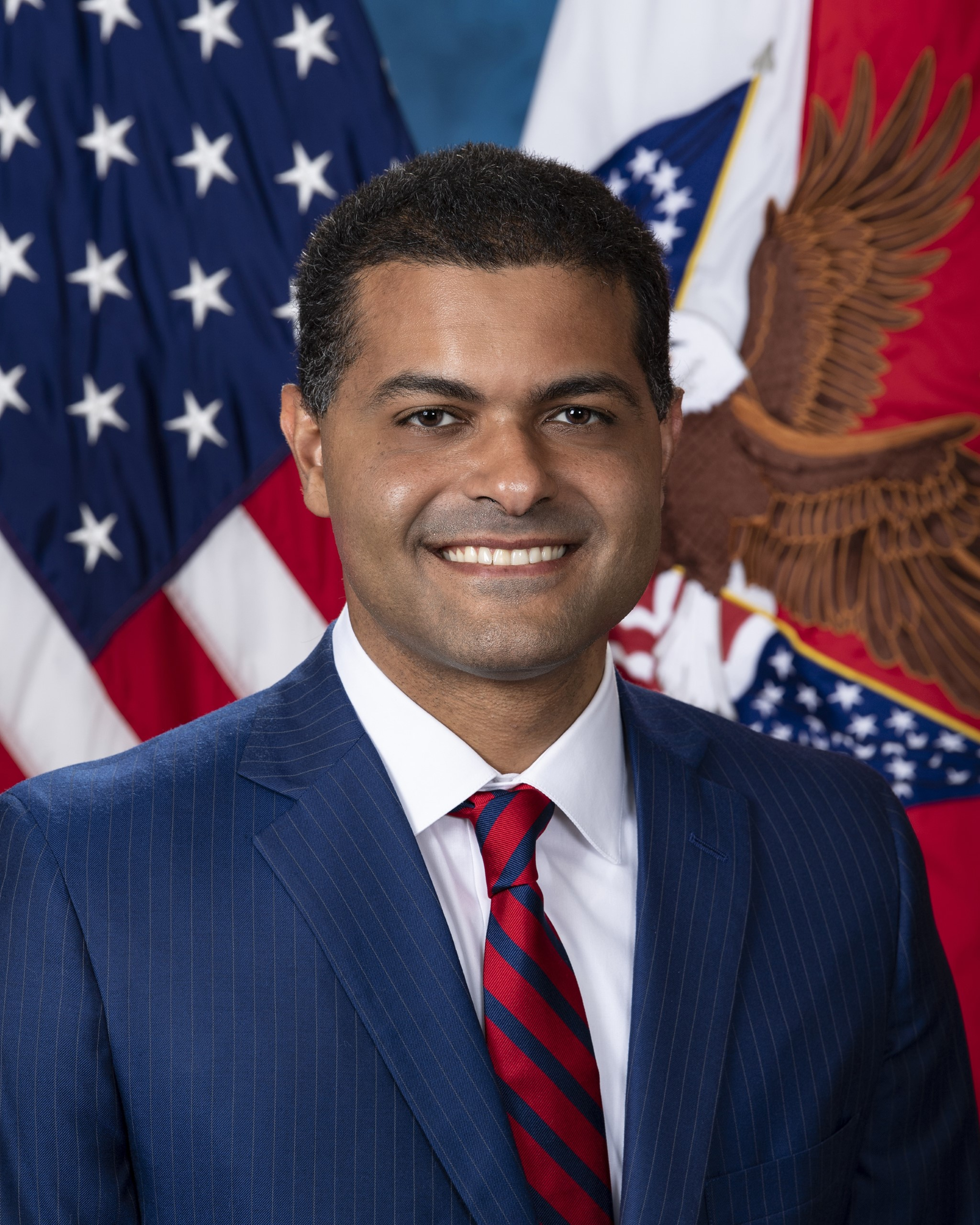

President, Oregon Health and Science University
- Incumbent
- Assumed office August 11, 2025

Under Secretary of Veterans Affairs for Health
- In office July 21, 2022 – January 20, 2025
- President: Joe Biden
- Preceded by: David Shulkin (2017)
- Succeeded by: John Bartrum

21st Commissioner of New Jersey Department of Health
- In office January 25, 2018 – July 1, 2019
- Governor: Phil Murphy
- Preceded by: Christopher Rinn
- Succeeded by: Judith Persichilli

Personal details
- Born: June 5, 1985 (age 41) New Jersey, U.S.
- Party: Independent
- Education: Johns Hopkins University (BA); Harvard University (MD, MBA)
- Profession: Medical doctor

Shereef Elnahal (born June 5, 1985) is an American physician and president of Oregon Health and Sciences University (OHSU). Prior to his appointment, he served as the United States Under Secretary of Veterans Affairs for Health, the 21st commissioner of the New Jersey Department of Health from 2018 to 2019, and the president/CEO of University Hospital in Newark from 2019 to 2022. He also previously served as an Assistant Deputy Under Secretary for Health for Quality, Safety and Value from 2016 to 2018.

In November 2020, Elnahal was named a volunteer member of the Joe Biden presidential transition Agency Review Team to support transition efforts related to the United States Department of Veterans Affairs. He was confirmed to his position as Undersecretary on July 22, 2022, and was sworn in on the same day. He resigned on January 20, 2025, upon the inauguration of President Donald J Trump.

== Early life and education ==
Elnahal is the son of physicians who moved to the United States from Egypt. He grew up in Linwood and Galloway Township and attended St. Augustine Preparatory School before graduating from Mainland Regional High School in 2003.

He received a Bachelor of Arts degree in biophysics from Johns Hopkins University and a dual M.D.–M.B.A. from Harvard University.

== Career ==
Elnahal was appointed to the White House Fellows program by President Barack Obama in 2015. He then served as the Assistant Deputy Under Secretary for Health for Quality, Safety and Value from 2016 to 2018 in the United States Department of Veterans Affairs from 2016 to 2018.

=== New Jersey Department of Health ===
Shereef Elnahal was nominated in January 2018 to serve in the Cabinet of New Jersey Governor Phil Murphy. He was approved by the New Jersey Senate on March 8, 2018 and sworn in on April 2, 2018. He is the first Muslim-American to serve in the cabinet. He resigned effective July 1, 2019 to become president/CEO of University Hospital in Newark.

In order address the opioid epidemic, Elnahal's efforts included expansion of syringe access and harm reduction, new funding to connect substance use disorder providers to electronic health records and a statewide health information exchange, and reducing regulatory barriers to medication-assisted treatment (MAT) for addiction treatment.

On June 24, 2019, Elnahal authorized NJ's paramedics to administer buprenorphine in the field after naloxone administration at the time of overdose. Although buprenorphine use for withdrawal management is technically off-label, the rationale is to manage a patient's withdrawal symptoms and cravings immediately after revival, in order to encourage more to accept transport to the emergency room for further care. NJ is the first state in the nation to take this step, and received national attention for doing so.

Soon after his election, Governor Murphy restored state funding to family planning agencies in New Jersey, which were line-item vetoed by Governor Chris Christie, Murphy's predecessor, for seven straight annual budgets. Under Commissioner Elnahal, the department then disbursed these funds in grants that resulted in 10,000 more women served, 80,000 additional STD tests administered, and many additional clinic hours and staff. Elnahal has also collaborated with NJ First Lady Tammy Murphy on maternal and infant health initiatives, including her Nurture NJ.

Elnahal also expanded provider participation in the NJ Health Information Network, a statewide health information exchange. Over 60 hospitals, three federally qualified health centers, and 6,000 physicians joined this network since the Murphy administration began, tying important sources of hospital funding like charity care to requirements to join the program.

During Elnahal's tenure, the Department of Health significantly expanded New Jersey's medical marijuana program, more than doubling the number of dispensaries and number of patients served and expanding the number of physicians in the program.

=== Veterans Health Administration ===
In March 2022, President Joe Biden nominated Elnahal to serve as Under Secretary of Veterans Affairs for Health. He was confirmed on July 21, 2022, by a vote of 66–23, and was sworn in the same day.

=== Oregon Health and Science University ===
In 2025, Elnahal was announced as the sixth president of OHSU, a leading public academic health center based in Portland, Oregon.

Political offices
Preceded by David M. Shulkin, M.D.	Under Secretary of Veterans Affairs for Health; 2022-2025	Succeeded by John Bartrum
