= James W. Holsinger =

United States Army general

James W. Holsinger Jr.
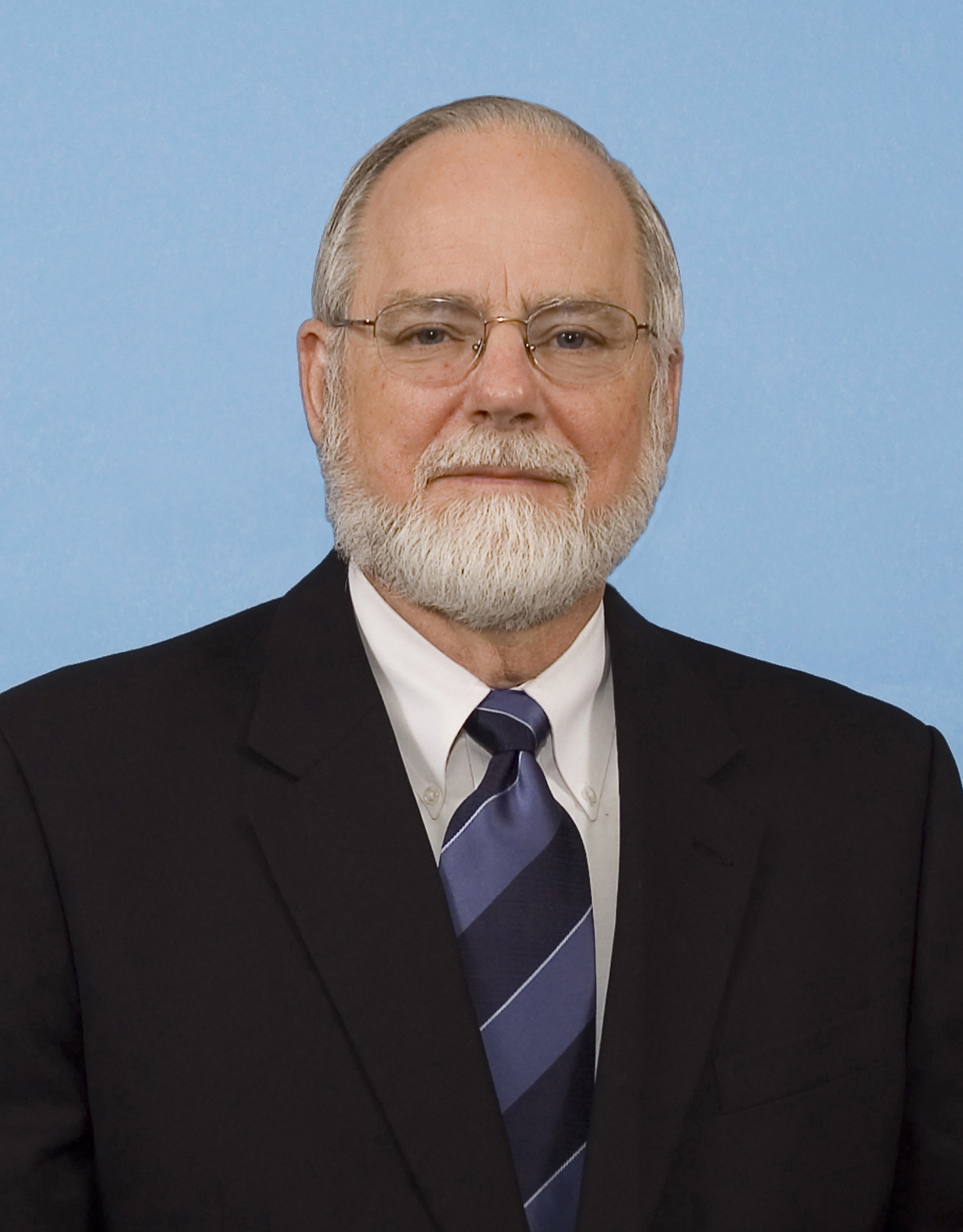

Kentucky Cabinet Secretary for Health and Family Services
- In office 2003–2005

Chancellor University of Kentucky's Chandler Medical Center
- In office 1994–2003

13th Under Secretary of Veterans Affairs for Health
- In office 1990–1993

Personal details
- Born: May 11, 1939 (age 87) (United States) Kansas City, Kansas
- Party: Republican
- Spouse(s): Barbara Craig Holsinger, Ph.D.
- Education: Duke University; University of Kentucky; University of South Carolina; Asbury Theological Seminary
- Occupation: Medicine, public health

James Wilson Holsinger Jr., (born May 11, 1939) is an American physician. A former major general in the U.S. Army Reserve (1962 to 1993), he has worked primarily in public health for over thirty years. He served as the Under Secretary of Veterans Affairs for Health from 1990 to 1993, during the administrations of George H. W. Bush and Bill Clinton. From 1994 to 2003, Holsinger was the Chancellor of the University of Kentucky's Chandler Medical Center. From 2003 to 2005 he served as Kentucky's Secretary of Health and Family Services.

On May 24, 2007, President George W. Bush nominated Holsinger to become the Surgeon General of the United States. Holsinger's nomination became controversial and was never voted on by the Senate due to, according to his critics, anti-gay bias in his work in the United Methodist Church where he voted to expel a lesbian pastor and for a 1991 report where he characterized gay sex as unnatural and unhealthy. In January 2009, instead, Bush appointed Holsinger to fill a vacant unpaid position on the President's Council on Physical Fitness and Sports to expire May 2010.

Holsinger obtained his medical degree in 1964 and a Ph.D. in anatomy in 1968, both from Duke University. As of 2009, he is a professor at the University of Kentucky. Holsinger is a leader in the United Methodist Church, serving as treasurer of the World Methodist Council and was previously President of the Judicial Council.

== Early life and education ==
Holsinger with his mother

Holsinger was born in Kansas City, Kansas, to James W. Holsinger Sr. (1906–1994), an Army brigadier general, and Ruth Reitz Holsinger (b. 1909).

Holsinger graduated from Duke University with an M.D. in 1964 and a Ph.D. in anatomy in 1968. He holds a degree from the University of Kentucky in human studies. Additionally, he holds master's degrees in hospital financial management from the University of South Carolina, as well as biblical studies from the Asbury Theological Seminary.

He served as a surgical resident at Duke University Medical Center and Shands Teaching Hospital where he was also a fellow in Cardiology. Holsinger has published four medical books and sixty-one peer-reviewed papers.

== Government career ==
=== Department of Veterans Affairs ===
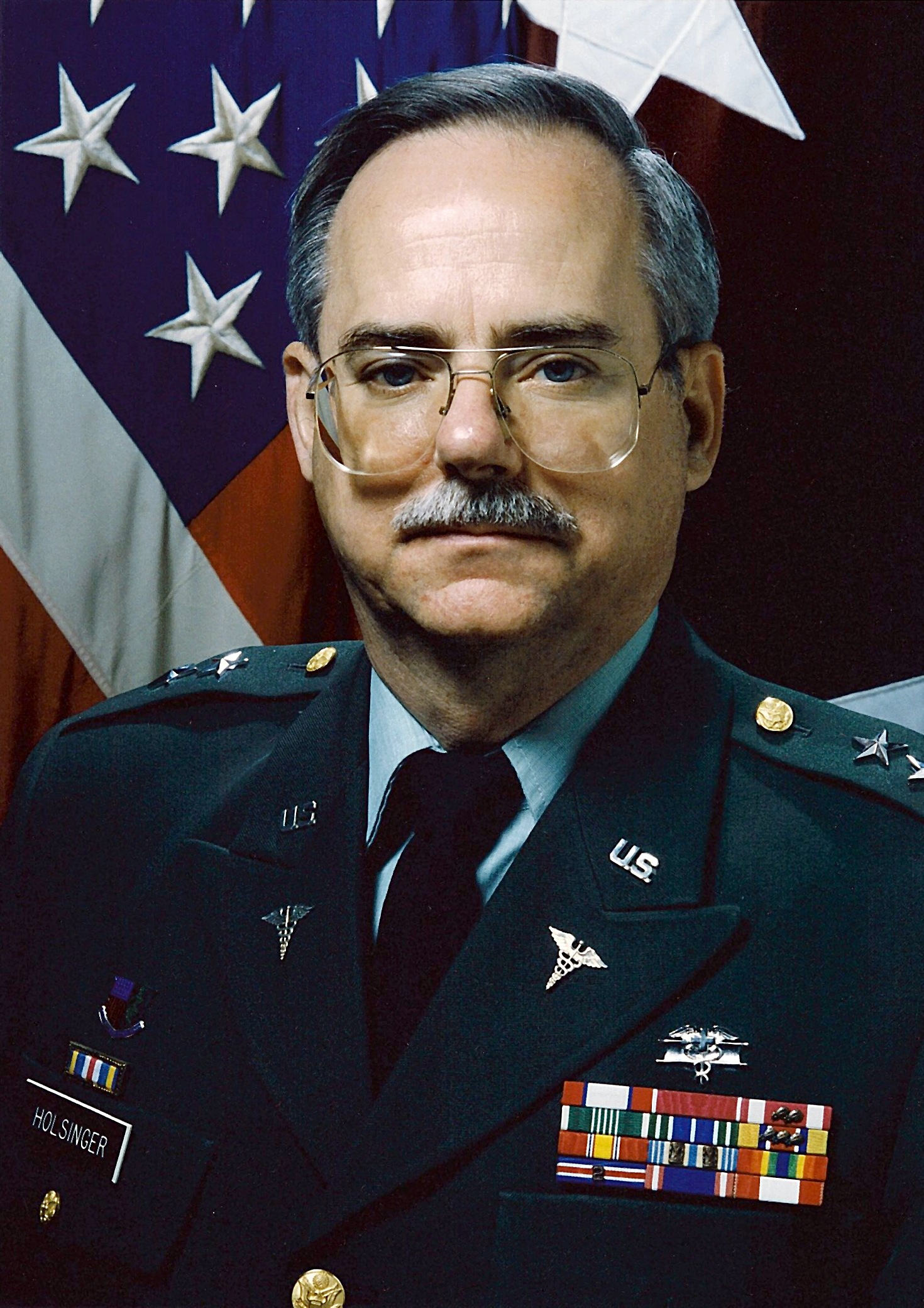
Holsinger Major General Portrait

Holsinger served for twenty-six years in the United States Department of Veterans Affairs (VA) from 1969 to 1994. He served at five different hospitals, rising to become a Medical Center Director. In 1990, President George H. W. Bush appointed Holsinger as Chief Medical Director of the VA (title changed to Under Secretary of Veterans Affairs for Health in 1992). He implemented the joint VA and Department of Defense Contingency Hospital System, which could provide 25,000 beds within seventy-two hours for soldiers fighting in Kuwait during the first Iraq War. He oversaw the nation's largest health care system, which served one million in-patients and twenty million out-patient visits per year. Holsinger also developed health care policy for twenty-six million veterans.

When Holsinger assumed the post of Chief Medical Director, the VA was criticized for the quality of the care it provided. In 1991, Holsinger acknowledged that inadequate care had caused the deaths of six patients at its North Chicago hospital. He commissioned a team to review the quality of care, and based on its findings suspended surgical care at the facility. Later, testimony before a Congressional subcommittee reported problems at more than thirty other veterans' hospitals. Holsinger responded, "Our patients are older, sicker and more complex than the average patient."

In 1993, he moved to Kentucky to become the Director of the VA Medical Center. He remained a consultant in cardiology for the hospital until 2003. Holsinger was awarded the Surgeon General's Medal by Surgeon General Antonia Novello.

=== United States Army Reserve ===
Holsinger served for over thirty-one years in the United States Army Reserve. He was awarded the Distinguished Service Medal, the Legion of Merit and the Meritorious Service Medal three times. He was assigned to the Joint Chiefs of Staff and promoted to major general in medical logistics working at the Pentagon under General Colin Powell. Holsinger retired from the United States Army Reserve in 1993.

== Academic career ==
=== University of Kentucky administration ===
Gill Heart Institute

From 1994 to 2003, Holsinger served as Chancellor of the University of Kentucky Medical Center with responsibility for five health colleges, four graduate centers, two hospitals, and numerous clinics in Kentucky. Under Holsinger's leadership, the university built the Gill Heart Institute and two research buildings, and Holsinger laid the groundwork for the expansion the hospital has undergone since he left. Holsinger helped establish the Women's Health Center and the College of Public Health. In 2004, he was named a Master in the American College of Physicians.

In the late 1990s, Holsinger led an international team to address the AIDS epidemic in sub-Saharan Africa. Working with Africa University in Zimbabwe, the team created a School of Health Sciences with nursing and public health programs to educate young people to deal with the AIDS crisis. Holsinger helped the university obtain a USAID grant to build the facility, which houses one of the few AIDS laboratories in southern Africa. In 2007, the program is preparing to field-test an HIV vaccine.

=== University of Kentucky faculty ===
After spending two years in Kentucky state government, he returned to the University of Kentucky as a professor for the graduate program in Public Health. In 2011, Holsinger was inducted into University of Kentucky College of Public Health Hall of Fame for his service and dedication. Holsinger is currently the Wethington Endowed Chair in the Health Sciences, Professor of Preventive Medicine and Health Management & Policy.

== Political career ==
=== Kentucky state government ===
Capitol, Frankfort Kentucky

Holsinger served as Secretary of the Cabinet for Health and Family Services for Kentucky under Governor Ernie Fletcher. He was responsible for the management of the state's health and social services programs, including the five billion dollar Kentucky Medicaid program. Holsinger also led the social services response to the 6,000 evacuees of Hurricane Katrina who relocated to Kentucky.

While serving as Secretary, Holsinger published a paper on physician professionalism stating that the autonomous practice of medicine contributes to physician dissatisfaction because of the prevalence of third-party payers and liability concerns. He recommended a new professional structure based on teamwork between physicians and "fair access to health care for all Americans."

The Associated Press said Holsinger was a financial supporter of the Republican Party. According to The Courier-Journal, he contributed $23,000 over ten years to the party and its candidates, including President George W. Bush.

== Religious life ==
=== Good Samaritan Foundation ===
Holsinger's current church

While Holsinger served as chair of the board of the Good Samaritan Foundation, a philanthropic health care organization, the United Methodist Church of Kentucky sued the foundation over control of $20 million in assets. Holsinger said the church was "only interested in the foundation's money, not its cause." In October, 2007, the case was decided in the church's favor.

=== Asbury Theological Seminary ===
In November, 2007, the Asbury Theological Seminary board of trustees attempted to remove Holsinger from its board for a possible conflict of interest because he was also a board member of the Association of Theological Schools in the United States and Canada, a division of which was investigating the accreditation status of the seminary. According to Holsinger, he subsequently resigned because he believed the board was asking him to be less than truthful with regulatory agencies.

== Nomination for Surgeon General ==
=== Confirmation process ===
Holsinger with Surgeon General Koop 2007

On May 24, 2007, Holsinger was nominated by George W. Bush to become the 18th Surgeon General of the United States. The Committee on Health, Education, Labor, and Pensions (HELP) held the confirmation hearing on July 12, 2007.

Holsinger was supported by the American College of Physicians and former Surgeons General C. Everett Koop and Joycelyn Elders. He was opposed by several gay and lesbian organizations and the American Public Health Association.

In October 2007, Scripps Howard News Service reported that the nomination was in trouble though he retained the support of several Republicans and the White House. The Senate committee was waiting for Holsinger to answer follow-up questions from the July confirmation hearing. On November 16, 2007, The Politico and the Los Angeles Times reported that due to rumors that Holsinger would be recess appointed, Senate Majority Leader Harry Reid would convene the chamber several times during the two-week Thanksgiving break, effectively avoiding adjourning the Senate and preventing any recess appointment. The same tactic was used for the 2007 holiday break.

Given the Democratic resistance coupled with Holsinger's lack of response to the committee's questions after more than ten months, in June 2008, thirteen months after his nomination, Kentucky Senator Jim Bunning, a Holsinger supporter, suggested the nomination was dead which the White House and fellow Kentucky Senator and Senate Minority Leader Mitch McConnell denied. The political scientist Norman Ornstein said, "It's extremely unusual for somebody not to answer questions. It's a big fat 'dis' of the committee and of the Senate. Even if you know or believe you are not likely to be confirmed, the idea that you wouldn't sort of do what the committee has asked is still kind of mind-boggling." The committee's Republican ranking member said Holsinger's lack of response was "not helpful" while the editorial board of Kentucky's Courier-Journal characterized it as "disrespectful" and "baffling".

The nomination was never voted on by the Senate and afterwards, in January 2009, Bush appointed him to fill a vacant unpaid position on the President's Council on Physical Fitness and Sports to expire May 2010.

=== Nomination controversy ===
Following the nomination, Holsinger's views on homosexuality came under scrutiny, and several Democratic senators expressed concern or opposition to the nomination. In addition, individuals released statements supporting or opposing the nomination. Kevin Naff, editor of the LGBT newspaper, the Washington Blade, charged that Holsinger has a "long record of anti-gay bias." Paul Weyrich, the conservative commentator, said opposition to Holsinger's nomination amounted to an assault on religious freedom. Still others asserted that Holsinger is not hostile to homosexuals citing his support for a session on lesbian health issues at a health conference and the support of a former colleague who is a lesbian.

The critics were largely concerned with a 1991 white paper he wrote titled Pathophysiology of Male Homosexuality for a committee in the United Methodist Church reviewing its position that homosexuality violates Christian teaching. According to Jake Tapper of ABC News, the paper "purported" to discuss homosexuality from a medical standpoint. But the Rev. J. Philip Wogaman, the main writer for the committee, said Holsinger imposed his views of homosexuality in the report. According to Wogaman, Holsinger resigned after he anticipated that the committee was preparing to support the moral dignity of non-promiscuous homosexuality. The church never adopted the committee's recommendations but continues to struggle with the issue.

Supporters of Holsinger's nomination defended the paper as a review of the relevant medical literature at that time. Critics said the paper reflected a pre-1970s view of human sexuality, and that it had a political agenda and was not a scientific paper. At his confirmation hearing, Holsinger said the paper did not represent his current views and was not "an example of my scientific work."

Critics have also expressed concerns about Holsinger's leadership of The United Methodist Church's Judicial Council, the highest court of the Church. In 2005, the court defrocked Irene Elizabeth Stroud, an openly lesbian minister, and in a separate case reinstated a pastor who had been suspended for refusing to allow a gay man to join his congregation. However, a Judicial Council member said that the decisions should not be read as Holsinger's personal views because the council does not have the power to establish church law and lacked the discretion to rule otherwise. But, as the New York Times noted, "some council members opposed his views, and the bishops later rejected one decision." On October 24, 2007, Holsinger announced he would not participate in the fall Judicial Council meeting set to decide on a case involving the appointment of a transgender clergy member, which upheld the appointment. Holsinger completed his 8-year term as a Judicial Council member and his 4-year term as its president in May 2008.

Finally, gay rights groups have expressed concerns that the church to which Holsinger belongs, Hope Springs United Methodist Church, had a program that tries to "cure" gays. However, the church's pastor denied this.

Supporters have pointed out that Holsinger faced down state legislators who, objecting to a session on lesbian health issues at a 2002 women's health conference, threatened to withhold funds. A former co-worker who is lesbian wrote that although a "liberal Democrat", she strongly supported Holsinger as a leader with integrity.

=== Public health stances ===
==== Smoking ====
Holsinger has been a strong advocate for tobacco restrictions, implementing smoking bans in the entire VA hospital system and pushing to increase the excise tax on cigarettes from 3 cents to 75 cents (ultimately raised to 30 cents) in a tobacco-growing state. At his confirmation hearing, Holsinger said one of his top three priorities is "making America a tobacco-free nation".

==== Childhood obesity ====
Holsinger has consistently aired concerns about childhood obesity, pushing for a limit on junk food in schools, lobbying and educating for the promotion of exercise and improvements of school nutrition. He included this as one of his highest priorities at his confirmation hearing. He said he supported banning mass media advertising of junk food geared to children.

==== Readiness of Public Health Service Commissioned Corps ====
During his confirmation hearings, Holsinger said that if confirmed he would focus on improving the ability of the Public Health Service Commissioned Corps to respond rapidly to emergencies.

==== Embryonic stem-cell research ====
In 2002, Holsinger testified at a Kentucky legislative hearing discussing stem cell research. The Christian right characterized his testimony as supporting a "loosening [of] regulations". However, the White House said that Holsinger's concerns only involved the severity of the penalties. In 2005, he argued against a Kentucky anti-cloning bill, warning it could restrict future research. Holsinger testified that his father died of Parkinson's disease which is under investigation for gene therapy. During the HELP hearing, Holsinger said he supported President Bush's stem cell policy, which restricts federal funding to already existing embryonic cell lines while providing funds for adult and animal stem cell research.

==== Sex education ====
Holsinger said that abstinence education is one way to prevent sexually transmitted diseases and unwanted teen pregnancy but also supported educating teenagers about condom use.

==== Morning after pill ====
Holsinger said he did not support restricting the availability of an emergency contraceptive known as the morning-after pill, or Plan B.

==== Health insurance industry ====
During the HELP hearing, Holsinger stated that he would seek ways to help the uninsured. "I think we need to have every American covered for health care." He offered no opinion on how to achieve this goal. He said that he supported banning drug companies from advertising on television.

==== Independence of the office of Surgeon General ====
Two days before the HELP confirmation hearing, former Surgeon General Richard Carmona went public with claims that the Bush Administration censored his speeches and buried his scientific reports. When asked about this at the hearing, Holsinger said, "If I were faced with a situation that I felt I could not in good conscience do, I think I have a clear response to that. I would resign."

== See also ==
- United States Department of Veterans Affairs
