= Jake Leinenkugel =

American businessman and politician (born 1952)

Chairman of the United States COVER Commission
- President: Donald Trump
- Preceded by: Office established

Personal details
- Born: Thomas Jacob Leinenkugel; February 18, 1952 (age 74) Chippewa Falls, Wisconsin, United States
- Party: Republican
- Education: Pepperdine University (BS)

Military service
- Allegiance: United States
- Branch/service: United States Marine Corps
- Years of service: 1979-1985
- Rank: Captain

Thomas Jacob Leinenkugel (born February 18, 1952) is an American businessman and politician; the chairman of the United States Creating Options for Veterans' Expedited Recovery (COVER) Commission. He was appointed to the role by President Donald Trump in June 2018.

== Early life and education ==
Leinenkugel attended the University of Wisconsin–Madison from 1971 to 1975 and received a bachelor's degree in business management at Pepperdine University in 1979. After college, Leinenkugel served six years in the United States Marine Corps and left with the rank of Captain.

== Career ==
In 1982, he began working as a sales manager and marketing director within his family's beer company, the Jacob Leinenkugel Brewing Company. He was president of the company from 1988 until his retirement in 2014.

In 2017, Leinenkugel was named as senior White House adviser for the United States Department of Veterans Affairs.

Leinenkugel has been on the boards of Marshfield Clinic, Wisconsin Labor Management Council, Momentum Chippewa Valley, St. Joseph and Sacred Heart Hospitals, Casper Foundation, and United Way. He is also a member of the U.S. Marine Corps Reserve Officer Association.
