= St. Francis Medical Center (Trenton, New Jersey) =

Hospital in New Jersey, US

Coordinates: 40.21675°N 74.74141°W

St. Francis Medical Center is a hospital within the City of Trenton, New Jersey, located on Hamilton Avenue and once owned by Trinity Health.

== History ==
St. Francis Hospital was founded in 1874 by the Sisters of St. Francis of Philadelphia. The hospital was introduced a plaque in honor of President John F. Kennedy in 1968. Today, the plaque is placed at the corner of Hamilton Avenue and Chambers Street. The building consists of a parking lot, emergency entrance (which has an entrance for only ambulances), and a main building.

Capital Health entered an agreement to purchase St. Francis Medical Center in 2022 and assumed operational control starting at midnight on 12/21/22. It was renamed Capital Health- East Trenton.

The hospital was the birthplace of United States Supreme Court Justice Antonin Scalia.

Murderer John List, who killed his family in 1971, and then spent nearly 18 years as a fugitive, died of pneumonia at St. Francis on March 21, 2008, at age 82, while serving five life sentences at the nearby New Jersey State Prison.
