= John Bartrum =

American Air Force general (born 1966)

Major General John J. Bartrum
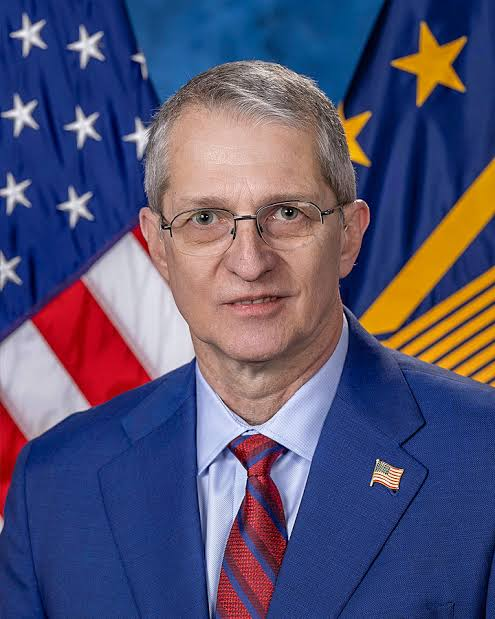
- Official portrait, 2025
- Born: February 22, 1966 (age 60); Grand Rapids, Michigan, U.S.
- Alma mater: Community College of the Air Force; McKendree College (BBA); Southern Illinois University (MBA); George Mason University (JD)
- Military career
- Allegiance: United States
- Branch: United States Air Force; Air Force Reserve
- Service years: 1983–1990 (active); 1990–present (reserve)
- Rank: Major General
- Unit: Air Force Reserve Command

John Joseph Bartrum (born February 22, 1966) is an American lawyer and major general in the United States Air Force Reserve.

Currently serving as a partner at Squire Patton Boggs, he was nominated by President Donald Trump to become the next assistant secretary for financial resources at the Department of Health and Human Services in 2017, during Trumps first term. Bartrum was a member of the Senior Executive Service, serving as a staff member on the United States House Committee on Appropriations, as budget director at the National Institutes of Health, and as a staff member in the Office of Management and Budget. In his role at the House Appropriations Committee, he helped to develop the Ebola virus disease supplemental budget. He is a combat veteran with nearly thirty years of military experience in both active duty and as a reserve officer. Bartrum is a Fellow of the National Academy of Public Administration.

== Early life and childhood ==
Bartrum was born in Grand Rapids, Michigan, in 1966. He is the second child of four to father Norman Bartrum, a factory worker at Whirlpool, and mother Kathryn (Kitty), a homemaker. His father died in a car crash while he was in grade school, and during his final years of high school, he and his brother were left to live alone. Immediately following his high school graduation, despite a scholarship offer to a state university, Bartrum followed his family's legacy and enlisted in the U.S. Air Force.

== Military career ==
At age 17, Bartrum enlisted in the U.S. Air Force, serving for six years in active duty before continuing his service in the U.S. Air Force Reserves. As an enlisted member, Bartrum worked in aircraft maintenance in the 375th Consolidated Aircraft Maintenance Squadron at Scott AFB in Illinois. In May 1990, Bartrum began serving in the Air Force Reserves and rose through the ranks over the course of his 30+ year career to become colonel on June 1, 2013.

Bartrum is a combat veteran, who was mobilized in support of Operations Desert Shield and Storm and Iraqi Freedom. He currently serves as a colonel in the Medical Service Corps assigned to a brigadier general position as the mobilization assistant to the commander of the Air Force Medical Operations Agency (AFMOA). He was nominated for promotion to major general in May 2022.

== Education ==
During his time in the Air Force, Bartrum completed an associate degree in survival/rescue operations from the Community College of the Air Force. Later, while stationed at Scott AFB just east of St. Louis, he obtained his bachelor's degree in business administration from McKendree College. In 1991, he finished his second associate degree from the Community College of the Air Force in bioenvironmental engineering.

Bartrum then went on to receive his Master of Business Administration from Southern Illinois University in 1994, and his J.D. from the George Mason University School of Law in 2004. Since obtaining his J.D., Bartrum has pursued continuing education degrees and certificates, completing courses at the Air Command and Staff College and the Air War College.
