= Governorship of Phil Murphy =

Phil Murphy's tenure as the 56th Governor of New Jersey

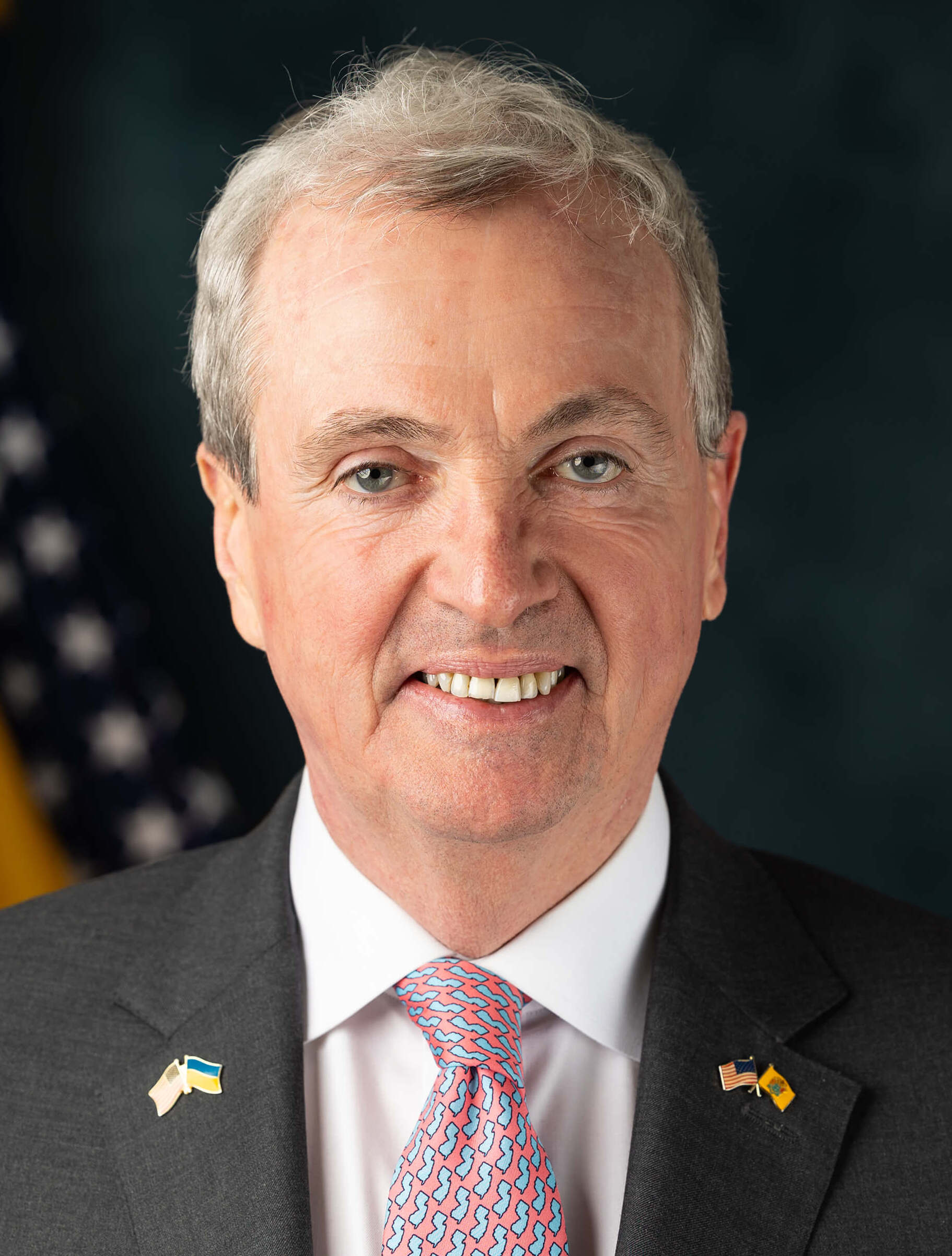
- Governorship of Phil Murphy; January 16, 2018 – January 20, 2026
- Party: Democratic
- Election: 2017; 2021
- Seat: Drumthwacket
- Seal of New Jersey

Phil Murphy became the 56th governor of New Jersey on January 16, 2018. He won re-election in 2021, becoming the first Democrat since Brendan Byrne in 1977 to do so. His first term, overshadowed by the COVID-19 pandemic, has been characterized as establishing the already liberal-leaning state as one of the nation's most progressive. As there is a two consecutive term limit in New Jersey, Murphy was ineligible for re-election. He was succeeded in 2026 by Congresswoman Mikie Sherrill, who had won the 2025 gubernatorial election.

== Election, transition, and inauguration ==
Murphy, a Democrat, was elected on November 7, 2017, in the New Jersey gubernatorial election. His election made New Jersey the seventh state in the US where control of the legislative and executive branches fell to Democrats. His transition team comprised over 500 persons who produced 14 reports with recommendations. He was sworn in at the Trenton War Memorial on January 16, 2018, for a term of four years. An inaugural ball was held at MetLife Stadium in the Meadowlands.

In 2019, opponents of Murphy launched a recall petition effort seeking to recall him from office. The petition organizers failed to obtain enough voter signatures to trigger a recall election.

In November 2021, Murphy was re-elected for a second term, the first Democratic Governor of New Jersey to win re-election since Brendan Byrne in 1977.

== Cabinet ==
As of 2018, there were 24 cabinet positions within the executive branch of the Government of New Jersey. Most cabinet nominees need to be confirmed by the New Jersey Senate before assuming their respective positions. Murphy had announced most nominations prior to his inauguration; some nominees have held their positions in prior administrations. In August 2018, Murphy created the New Jersey Commission on Science, Innovation and Technology, naming Beth Simone Noveck as Chief Innovation Officer. Women make up more than 50% of the cabinet.

The Murphy Cabinet
| Office | Name | Term |
| Governor | Phil Murphy | 2018–2026 |
| Lieutenant Governor | Sheila Oliver | 2018–2023 |
| Tahesha Way | 2023–present |
| Adjutant General | Jemal J. Beale | 2018–2020 |
| Lisa J. Hou | 2020–2024 |
| Yvonne Mays (Acting) | 2024–2026 |
| Secretary of Agriculture | Douglas H. Fisher | 2009–2023 |
| Joe Atchison III (Acting) | 2023–2024 |
| Edward Wengryn | 2024–2026 |
| Attorney General | Gurbir Grewal | 2018–2021 |
| Andrew Bruck (Acting) | 2021–2022 |
| Matt Platkin | 2022–2026 |
| Commissioner of Banking and Insurance | Marlene Caride | 2018–2023 |
| Justin Zimmerman (Acting) | 2023–2026 |
| Commissioner of Children and Families | Christine Norbut Beyer | 2018–2026 |
| Commissioner of Community Affairs | Sheila Oliver | 2018–2023 |
| Kimberly K. Holmes (Acting) | 2023–2023 |
| Jacquelyn A. Suárez | 2023–2026 |
| Commissioner of Corrections | Marcus O. Hicks | 2018–2021 |
| Victoria Kuhn | 2021–2026 |
| Commissioner of Education | Lamont Repollet | 2018–2020 |
| Kevin Dehmer (Acting) | 2020–2020 |
| Dr. Angelica Allen McMillan (Acting) | 2020–2024 |
| Kevin Dehmer (Acting) | 2024–2026 |
| Secretary of Higher Education | Zakiya Smith Ellis | 2018–2020 |
| Dr. Brian Bridges | 2020–2026 |
| Commissioner of Environmental Protection | Catherine McCabe | 2018–2021 |
| Shawn LaTourette | 2021–2026 |
| Commissioner of Health | Shereef Elnahal | 2018–2019 |
| Judith Persichilli | 2019–2023 |
| Kaitlan Baston | 2023–2026 |
| Commissioner of Human Services | Carole Johnson | 2018–January 2021 |
| Sarah Adelman | January 2021–Present |
| Commissioner of Labor and Workforce; Development | Robert Asaro-Angelo | 2018–2026 |
| Secretary of State | Tahesha Way | 2018–2026 |
| Chief Technology Officer | Christopher J. Rein | 2018–2026 |
| Commissioner of Transportation | Diane Gutierrez-Scaccetti | 2018–2024 |
| Francis K. O'Connor | 2024–2026 |
| State Treasurer | Elizabeth Maher Muoio | 2018–2026 |
| Chair/Chief Executive Officer of the Civil Service Commission | Deirdre Webster Cobb | 2018–2023 |
| Allison Chris Myers | 2023–2026 |
| Chief of the Economic Development Authority | Tim Sullivan | 2018–2026 |
| Director of the Office of Homeland; Security and Preparedness | Jared Maples | 2017–2021 |
| Laurie Doran | 2021–2026 |
| Chair/Chief Administrator of the Motor Vehicle Commission | B. Sue Fulton | 2018–2022 |
| Latrecia Littles-Floyd (Acting) | 2022–2026 |
| President of the Board of Public Utilities | Joe Fiordaliso | 2018–2023 |
| Christine Guhl-Sadovy | 2023–2026 |
| State Comptroller | Philip Degnan | 2015–2020 |
| Kevin Walsh (Acting) | 2020–2026 |
| Superintendent of the State Police | Col. Patrick Callahan | 2017–2026 |
- * Acting officeholder only.

== Environment and energy ==
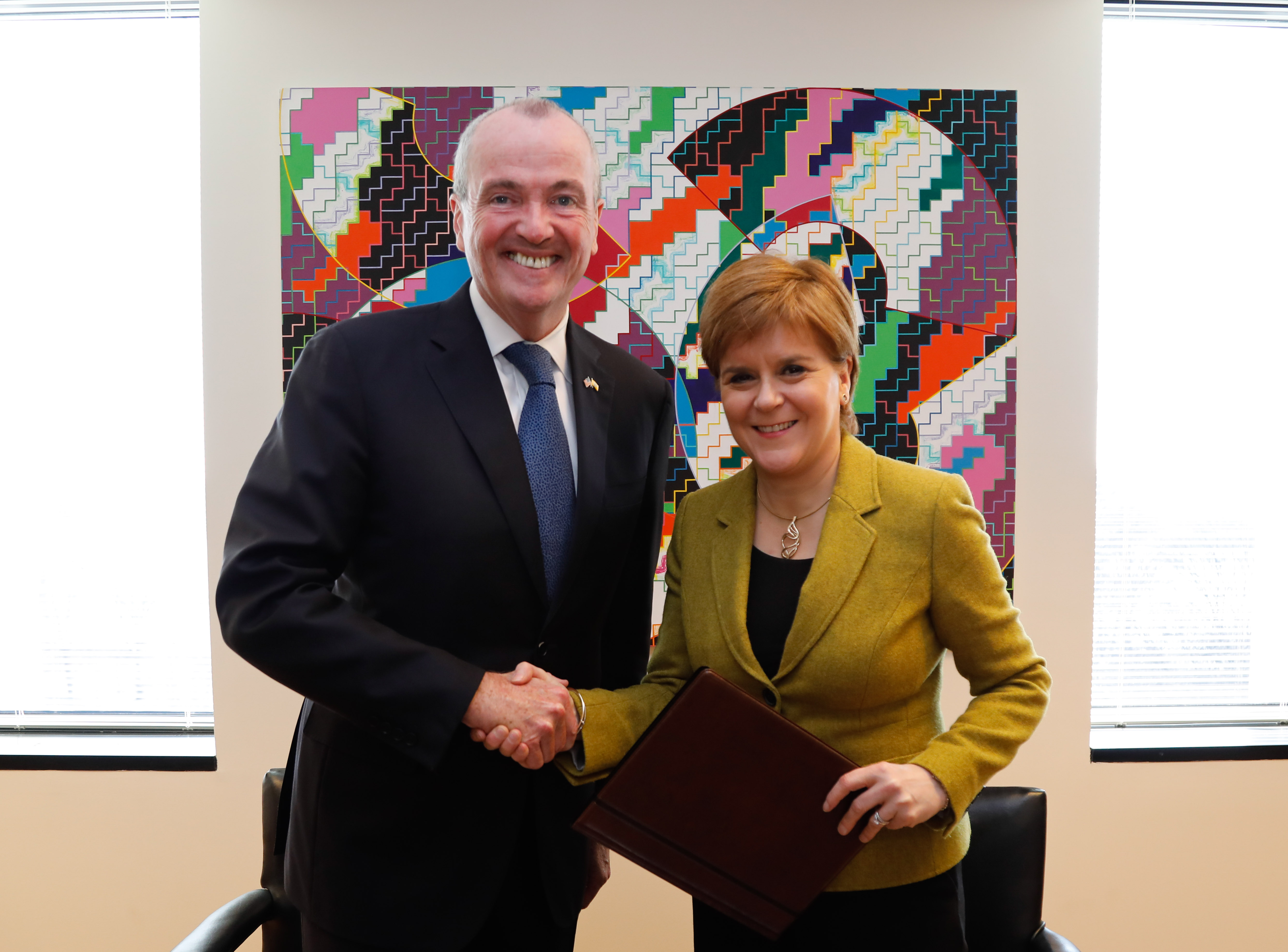
Murphy meets with First Minister of Scotland Nicola Sturgeon to tackle climate change.

=== RGGI and Paris Accord ===
On November 29, 2011, New Jersey withdrew from the Regional Greenhouse Gas Initiative, effective January 1, 2012. Murphy has said he would sign legislation to re-join. On January 29, 2018, Murphy signed an executive order reinstating New Jersey back into the Regional Greenhouse Gas Initiative.

In February 2018 he signed legislation committing New Jersey to the Paris Agreement.

In February 2022 he announced the state would use $70 Million of funding from RGGI to support electrification of medium- and heavy-duty trucks.

=== Clean energy ===
In June 2019 Murphy revealed a draft Energy Master Plan, which envisions New Jersey as being 100% reliant on sustainable energy by 2050. An updated plan is intended to be released in 2025.

In February 2022 he signed an executive order setting a goal of having 100% clean electricity by 2035, moving the target 15 year earlier.

In January 2018, Murphy signed an executive order to revive subsidies for wind power in the state. In September 2018, the state began to solicit bids for projects off-shore. In June 2019, the state awarded a contract for Ocean Wind, a windfarm 15 miles off Atlantic City.

Murphy set a goal of electrifying 400,000 homes and 20,000 commercial buildings by 2030.

Murphy created the state's Storage Incentive Program, which will promote 2,000 MW of energy storage installations by 2030.

=== Fracking, offshore drilling, and PennEast Pipeline ===
Murphy planned to make permanent a temporary ban on fracking in the state that had been in place since 2010.

The Trump administration had proposed opening almost all federal waters to offshore drilling, including off the coast of the Jersey Shore, and dividing them into sections and auctioning leases to oil companies. The Murphy administration had joined 11 other East Coast states in expressing concern that the plan disregards "vital state interests, economies, and resources".

The Murphy administration opposed the condemnation state owned properties to construct the PennEast Pipeline.

=== Clean Water Rule ===
In February 2018, NJ joined nine other states in suing the U.S. Environmental Protection Agency for suspending the Clean Water Rule

=== New power plant ===
In October 2019, Murphy officially opposed construction of a new power plant in New Jersey Meadowlands in North Bergen.

=== Plastics ===
Murphy supported strict regulation on the use of single-use plastic bags, straws, and styrofoam. A ban came into effect in 2020.

== Transportation ==
=== NJ Transit ===
Following campaign promises to improve both infrastructure and the safety record of NJ Transit (NJT), the state-run public transportation agency, Murphy requested, in January 2018, resignation letters from approximately 20 senior staff members, and signed an executive order calling for a complete audit. Kevin S. Corbett was appointed director of the agency in January 2018.

In December 2018, Murphy signed into law new legislation which would overhaul the way the NJT is managed.

In 2019, Murphy proposed using NJT stations and surrounding land to develop more transit-oriented development & urban transit hub commercial, residence, and recreational communities.

=== Gateway Project ===
Murphy supported the Gateway Project, which would expand and renovate the Northeast Corridor (NEC) rail line between Newark and New York Penn Station.

=== Port Authority Bus Terminal ===
Murphy supported the development of solutions of problems created by the aging, overcrowded Port Authority Bus Terminal.

=== Vehicle electrification ===
In February 2022 he announced that New Jersey would begin rulemaking to follow California's standard of all new car sales being electric vehicles by 2035.

== Health and public safety ==
=== Opioid crisis ===
In February, the New Jersey Attorney General announced the newly formed Office of the New Jersey Coordinator for Addiction Response and Enforcement Strategies (NJ CARES) within the New Jersey Department of Law and Public Safety, statewide initiative to combat the opioid crisis. The administration considered making Narcan, used to reverse the effects of and overdose, available for free.

=== Reproductive services funding ===
In February 2018, Murphy signed his first piece of legislation, the restoration of $7.5 million annual funding for Planned Parenthood, which had been cut early in the Christie administration. In 2020 funding reached $9.5 million.

=== Firearm regulation ===
Murphy had said he would support strengthening regulation of firearms in New Jersey. The mandate established in the Childproof Handgun Law may be re-visited. A memorandum of agreement with other Northeast states allows New Jersey to share info on weapons in a database. As of February 2018, new laws regarding firearms were negotiated in the New Jersey Legislature. Several passed the Assembly, but have not advanced in the Senate.

In April 2018, Murphy signed an executive order for the state to issue online reports online about gun crimes including location, number of killed or injured, type of weapon, and state in which involved guns originated.

In June 2018, Murphy signed six new laws regulating gun ownership. In October federal courts upheld a rule limiting ammunition to 10-round cartridges.

In October 2018, Murphy signed into law a ban on "ghost guns" and 3D-printable guns

In April 2019, Murphy proposed increasing firearms fees, which have not been adjusted since the 1960s.

=== Health insurance mandate ===
Effective January 1, 2018, all New Jersey residents are required by law to have health insurance. The administration intended to preserve most protections provided by the Patient Protection and Affordable Care Act (so-called Obamacare), should that federal program be overturned or de-funded. In January 2020, Murphy signed legislation which align with policies of the ACA.

=== Emergency housing assistance ===
In February 2019, Murphy vetoed a law that had overwhelmingly passed in the State Legislature to provide emergency housing assistance. The bill would have covered those who are homeless or in danger of becoming homeless. A person or family could receive this assistance only once (in seven years) for one 12-month period, with a possible six-month extension. The bill sought to let a person or family become eligible for the housing aid again after seven years had passed.

=== Aid in dying ===
On April 13, 2019, Gov. Murphy signed a law allowing terminally ill New Jerseyans with less than six months to live to end their lives with the assistance of a doctor. It became effective August 1, 2019.

=== Coronavirus pandemic ===
The first case of the coronavirus was reported on March 5, 2020, when a 32-year-old man from Fort Lee, Bergen County, tested positive. Murphy ordered a near 'lockdown' on March 23 at 9 pm via executive order. As of April 11, 2020 he had signed 24 executive orders to deal with the pandemic. April 28 saw the highest number of deaths in the state. Murphy met with President Donald Trump on April 30, 2020, to discuss how to proceed. On May 4 he ordered that schools remain closed for the duration of the school year. In May 2020 interview Murphy said with regard to loosening restrictions in the state: “But here is the reality: Public health creates economic health. It is not the other way around. And if we transpose those steps or if we jump the gun irresponsibly, we throw — based on any amount of evidence — gasoline on the fire and it gets a lot worse. Never mind from a public health standpoint, the economic health gets a lot worse.” As of May 15, 2020, the state counted 10,000 deaths. Approval rating for Murphy rose for his handling of the crisis. On June 24, the state imposed self-quarantine restrictions on persons arriving from other U.S states where corona cases were spiking. At the end of June 2020, Murphy reversed his decision to allow for indoor dining (part of the 2nd phase of the state's re-opening) after dramatic spikes in cases in other states and behaviour by "knuckleheads" in some restaurants. He implemented a 14-day quarantine for those visiting from 'high-risk' states. The July 7, 2020 primary election was conducted mostly by mail and was seen as an experiment for the November election. On July 8, Murphy signed an executive order mandating the use of face masks outdoors (with exceptions) where social distancing was not possible. The state has released persons held in both state and county prisons to reduce deaths by the COVID-19. In early August Murphy paused or rescinded certain aspects of the phased 'reopening' of New Jersey after cases in the state increased after a period of decline. In mid-August Murphy announced that the November 2020 election would be hybrid, with "mostly" mail-in balloting.

The Murphy Administration presided over the issuance by the New Jersey Government of $1.2 million in fines to Atilis Gym, a gym that defied Governor Murphy's Covid shutdown policies.

On June 5, 2021 Murphy signed an executive order ending the public health emergency, while retaining some executive privileges and restrictions.

== Social rights ==
=== Marijuana ===
Cannabis in New Jersey is legal for possession and use in both medical and recreational cases, but recreational distribution remains illegal. Murphy promised to legalize recreational marijuana within the first 100 days of his administration. Despite a Democratic super majority in the New Jersey Assembly and State Senate, there had been opposition within his own party as well as some Republicans, thus casting doubt on the passage of such legislation. Some legislators had proposed broader decriminalization instead of legalization. A bill allowing for both recreational marijuana (for users over twenty-one years) and an expansion of medical marijuana was presented to the NJ Senate in June, 2018. In February 2019, it was announced that Murphy and New Legislature had agreed to tax marijuana sales by weight, rather than with a sales tax. Legalization would also allow for expungement for previous arrests. Support for legalization by New Jersey residents is polled at above 50%. Sixty municipalities in the state have passed resolutions to ban the sale within their respective borders. A vote on the bill to legalize was withdrawn on March 25, 2019, when it appeared there was not enough support to pass it. The amount in the possession of the previously convicted eligible for expungement remains contentious. With the unlikelihood of legalization, further decriminalization is being considered. The issue was taken up as a referendum and was passed by voters in November 2020.

On Monday, February 22, 2021, Murphy signed three bills into law legalizing and decriminalizing marijuana. The legislation creates a regulated marijuana industry and addresses the disproportionate arrests of people of color over marijuana possession. He said: “As of this moment, New Jersey’s broken and indefensible marijuana laws, which permanently stained the records of many residents and short-circuited their futures, and which disproportionately hurt communities of color and failed the meaning of justice at every level, social or otherwise, are no more.” Numerous municipalities have restricted the sale of marijuana within them.

=== Employee rights ===
Murphy had said he would support legislation to close the gender pay gap and increase the minimum wage to $15 per hour. His first official action as governor was an executive order to support equal pay for women in the state government. In April 2018 he signed legislation making it illegal to pay a woman less than a man for the same job unless there is viable reason. In May 2018, Murphy signed into law legislation requiring that all employees be entitled to pay sick leave based on the previous year's number of worked hours. In January 2019 he worked with legislative leaders to reach an agreement to raise the minimum wage in 2019 to $10 per hour and to $15 per hour by 2024. Murphy signed the bill in February 2019 with the first wage hike to take effect by July 1, 2019 with the wage going up to $10 an hour. A law effective January 1, 2020 made it illegal to ask for previous salary histories.

=== Immigrants ===
Murphy has said that he would make the state more welcoming for its undocumented immigrant population. He has said he is committed to creating an Office of Immigrant Protection, to assist those facing deportation with legal assistance. The administration is seeking funds for law enforcement being withheld by the Trump administration for what it claims are sanctuary cities. New guidelines for how local police interact with ICE and immigrants became a source of contention for federal authorities. It has been challenged by some county governments.

In April 2018, Murphy signed a bill to let unauthorized immigrants who are residents of New Jersey apply for college financial aid.

On December 19, 2018 Murphy signed legislation paving the way for immigrants to receive drivers license without necessarily revealing their immigration status.

=== Minimum age for legal marriage ===
On June 22, 2018, Murphy signed a law raising the legal age for marriage in New Jersey to eighteen.

=== Automatic voter registration ===
In March 2018, Murphy signed legislation which automatically registers all those who apply for a driver's license or state ID to vote.

=== Third gender birth certificates ===
In July 2018 Murphy signed into law legislation to allow for third gender birth certificates, including the designation "X", which became effective January 2019.

=== Limitations on solitary confinement ===
In June 2019, Murphy signed a law severely restricting the use of solitary confinement in New Jersey prisons.

=== Statute of limitations on sexual abuse ===
In May 2019, Murphy signed legislation expanded the time period during which victims of sexual abuse can sue their alleged abusers and affiliated organizations.

=== Clemency and pardons ===
In 2024 Murphy created a clemency advisory board after not granting even a single clemency application in his first seven years in office. In December 2024 Murphy commuted the sentences of 33 prisoners held in state prisons.

== Economy and taxation ==
=== Federal tax deductions and municipal charitable funds ===
Murphy's administration faced severe fiscal challenges with the reduction of allowable deductions for federal taxes. He supported the creation of municipal charitable funds in lieu of taxation. The state had adopted regulations allowing New Jersey's municipalities, counties, and school districts to accept some real estate taxes as charitable donations to help residents get around a $10,000 limit on state and local tax deductions under the 2018 federal tax overhaul. New Jersey sued the federal government when the Internal Revenue Service (IRS) disallowed the regulation. A federal judge dismissed the case, saying that New Jersey and three other states had not proved that it was unconstitutional.

=== Millionaires tax and sales tax changes ===
Murphy's proposed 2018 budget included various new sources of revenue, a return to sales tax rate of 7% (3.5% on UEZ areas), including ride sharing services and home sharing services, and closing corporate tax loop-holes. Murphy has said he would consider increasing the so-called "millionaires' tax", increasing the rate of taxation for high-income (over $1 million) households in order to increase state revenue. Murphy proposed returning the sales tax 7%, which was reduced to 6.625% in 2018. In June 2018, Murphy signed a law extending reduced sales tax in many of New Jersey's cities. In June 2018, Murphy and the New Jersey Assembly agreed to a last-minute deal in which income over $5 million and corporate tax would be raised, while the sales tax would remain the same. In 2019, Murphy again promoted a "millionaires' tax" as part of the state budget, suggesting that legislation be put before the New Jersey Legislature. In September 2020, Murphy and legislators agreed increase tax on incomes over $1 million, by 2%, and give $500 tax rebate to families earning under $150,000.

=== EDA tax incentives and investigation ===
In January 2018, Governor Phil Murphy signed an executive order to initiate an audit of the tax incentives made to businesses by the New Jersey Economic Development Authority (EDA), saying that oversight of the programs was insufficient and had not been properly regulated. The audit, released in January 2019, found the EDA may have “improperly awarded, miscalculated, overstated and overpaid” tax credits. The task force created to investigate has been challenged in a court case by some of the recipients of the incentives, including board member George Norcross. Norcross has filed lawsuit against Murphy and has asked for a restraining to halt the investigation. That was denied. It was found that at least 12 companies had not fulfilled their incentive requirements. Former governor Chris Christie, under whose administration many deals were made, called the investigation a charade. Murphy and the state legislation disagreed on how to re-vamp the incentive program.

=== State-owned bank ===
Murphy had proposed establishing a state-owned bank, which would hold public funds normally kept in commercial banks and be used for economic stimulus. In November 2019, he signed an executive order to create it. Some members of the New Jersey Senate have said they will not support the initiative.

=== Baby bond ===
In August 2020, Murphy proposed creating a $1,000 "baby bond" for New Jersey's children, which would be payable with interest at the age of eighteen. It was ultimately dropped from budget proposals.

== Education ==
Murphy had ordered a comprehensive review of the way charter schools in the state operate.

Several members of Murphy's transition team and others filed a lawsuit on May 17, 2018 to desegregate the public schools. Latino Action Network v. New Jersey is a lawsuit claims that the State of New Jersey provides separate and unequal schools to minority children in violation of their constitutional rights.

== Sports betting ==
Murphy supported the legalization of sports betting—the placing of bets on professional and college sports matches. Following a ruling from the U.S. Supreme Court that eliminated restrictions, New Jersey created legislation to permit it, which Murphy signed into law on June 11, 2018.

== Investigation into hiring practices ==
=== Role of First Lady ===
Tammy Murphy, the First Lady of New Jersey, is not elected and draws no state salary but is very involved in the administration. In April 2018, Murphy was criticized for reportedly spending $13,000 of taxpayer money to create an office for his wife. Governor Murphy's spokesperson has defended the expenditures, arguing that Murphy's wife has taken a prominent enough role to warrant the office. Democratic state Assembly Majority Leader Lou Greenwald suggested that Tammy Murphy should be given an official title to reduce confusion.

=== Department of Education ===
Murphy first faced questions about his hiring practices when he selected Marcellus Jackson as an aide in the Department of Education. Jackson had served prison time for taking bribes as a councilman in Passaic County and thus was not allowed to hold public positions. Murphy stood by Jackson, but Jackson was forced to resign.

On October 15, 2018, an independent investigation into Murphy's hiring of former Schools Development Authority Chief of Staff Al Alvarez was commissioned. The next day, the New Jersey Legislature announced it would form an investigative panel regarding Murphy's hiring decisions. In June 2019 35 employees of the Schools Development Authority were fired after it was determined that the director appointed by Murphy had hired those connected to her.

Murphy also faced questions about Al Alvarez, who was accused of sexual assault by Katie Brennan, now chief of staff at the state's housing agency. Brennan alleged that Alvarez sexually assaulted her in April 2017, after a gathering of Murphy campaign staffers at a bar in Jersey City. Alvarez had offered to drive Brennan home and asked to go inside Brennan's home to use the bathroom. Once inside, Alvarez allegedly sexually assaulted her. Brennan claims she kicked Alvarez off and locked herself in a bathroom.

Brennan claimed she brought her allegations to the Murphy camp three times. The first time was when she alerted the transition team after Murphy won the election in November 2017 while working for the transition team. Brennan again brought the complaint in March 2018 to Matt Platkin, chief counsel to the governor, who referred the matter to an ethics official in the governor's office. Brennan emailed Murphy and his wife on June 1, 2018, saying she wanted to discuss a "sensitive matter." No discussion ever occurred, but Brennan said a campaign attorney told her Alvarez would no longer have a state government job. Alvarez stayed at his job for about four months after Brennan was told he would be out. A legislative report as highly critical of how Murphy's team handle the matter. Alvarez claims defamation.

New Jersey Supreme Court Justice Peter Verniero will lead an independent investigation into a "systemic review of the hiring and vetting practices of the governor-elect’s transition office." Additionally, New Jersey Senate President Stephen Sweeney said he would form a six-member, bipartisan committee to investigate the handling of sexual assault allegations against Alvarez, among other issues.

== Midterm elections ==
In the November 2019 election, the 1st Legislative District, traditionally a Republican stronghold, elected two Republicans changing the composition of the New Jersey Legislature. In the 2023 elections, there was no change in the Senate, and Democrats gained six seats in the General Assembly.

== Time out-of-state ==
Murphy spent 95 days out of state in 2019.

== See also ==
- Governorship of Chris Christie
