= Platkin =

Platkin is a surname. Notable people with the surname include:

- Charles Stuart Platkin, American author
- Matthew Platkin (born 1986/1987), American lawyer
