= Diane Gutierrez-Scaccetti =

American government official

Chief of Staff to the Governor of New Jersey
- In office September 30, 2023 – January 20, 2026
- Governor: Phil Murphy
- Preceded by: George Helmy

Commissioner of the New Jersey Department of Transportation
- In office 2018–2024
- Governor: Phil Murphy
- Preceded by: Richard T. Hammer
- Succeeded by: Francis K. O'Connor

Personal details
- Born: Newark, New Jersey, U.S.
- Party: Democratic
- Education: University of Connecticut (BS); Rutgers University, New Brunswick (MS)

Diane Gutierrez-Scaccetti is the former executive director of the New Jersey Turnpike Authority and Florida's Turnpike Enterprise. She became acting commissioner of the New Jersey Department of Transportation in January 2018 and was confirmed in June 2018 and acting director of the state's Transportation Trust Fund Authority. She also serves chair of the board for NJ Transit.

== Background and education ==
Gutierrez-Scaccetti was born in Newark, New Jersey, and raised in Lawrence Township, Mercer County, New Jersey. She attended the University of Connecticut (1977–1981), attaining a bachelor's of science degree in business administration, and Rutgers University-New Brunswick (1983–1987), graduating at the top of her class (4.0 GPA) with a masters of science degree in human resources and industrial relations.

== Career ==
=== New Jersey Turnpike Authority ===
The New Jersey Turnpike Authority oversees the New Jersey Turnpike and the Garden State Parkway. Gutierrez-Scaccetti began her work for the agency as assistant contract administrator in the law department. She became chief of staff in 1995 and deputy director in 1997 before becoming executive director in 2008. During her tenure she worked on bond issues, labor negotiations, implementation of E-ZPass, the consolidation of the turnpike and parkway under the agency and widening projects for both roadways. She resigned in June 2010 soon after the beginning of Christie administration.

=== Florida's Turnpike Enterprise ===
In August 2011 she became the executive director and CEO of the Florida's Turnpike Enterprise. In 2013, Gutierrez-Scaccetti chose Conduent for the SunPass electronic toll collection system over its competitors, even though the competitors were cheaper and had better technical scores. Gutierrez-Scaccetti flew to New Jersey for an industry conference less than two weeks before the selection meeting. After the conference, she delayed her flight to meet with Conduent representatives and one of its subcontractors. Florida state employees involved in awarding contracts are prohibited from discussing the bidding with the competing companies before the selection is made It is expected that the Florida Turnpike Enterprise will lose more than $50 Million because of Conduent's inability to process tolls.

=== New Jersey Department of Transportation ===
She was nominated to be commissioner of the New Jersey Department of Transportation by Governor of New Jersey Phil Murphy in December 2017, pending New Jersey Senate approval, which she received in June 2018. In addition to the roads and bridges, the department is also responsible for mass transit in the state, largely provided by NJ Transit, which Murphy has called a "national disgrace". In this position, she also served as the chair of TRB's executive committee in 2023.

== See also ==
- Governorship of Phil Murphy
- Kevin S. Corbett
