= Gurbir Grewal =

American attorney and prosecutor (born 1973)

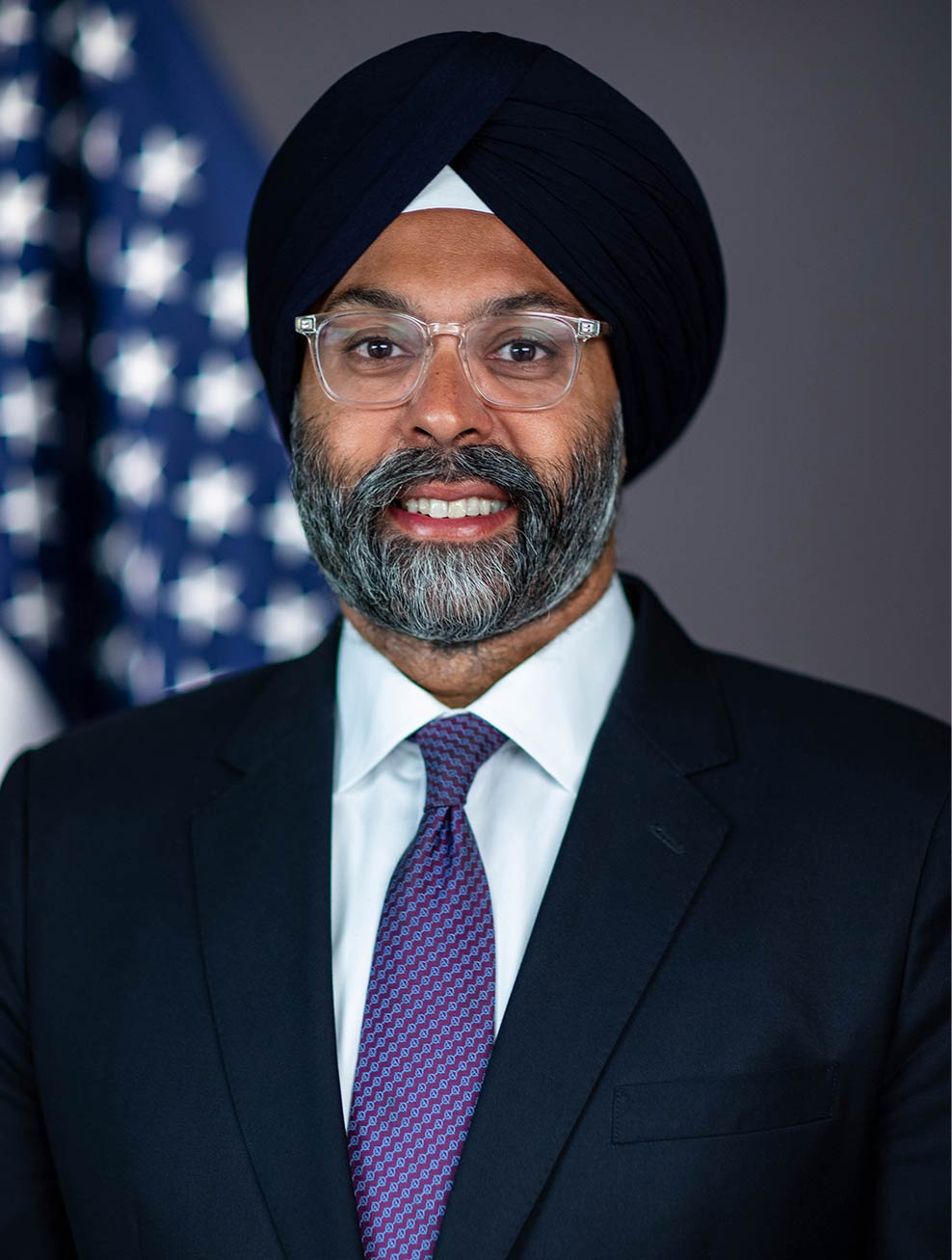
- Official portrait, 2021

Director of the Division of Enforcement, Securities and Exchange Commission
- In office July 26, 2021 – October 11, 2024
- Preceded by: Melissa Hodgman (acting)
- Succeeded by: Sanjay Wadhwa (acting)

61st Attorney General of New Jersey
- In office January 16, 2018 – July 16, 2021
- Governor: Phil Murphy
- Preceded by: Christopher Porrino
- Succeeded by: Andrew Bruck (acting)

Prosecutor of Bergen County
- In office January 4, 2016 – January 16, 2018; Acting: January 4, 2016 – January 12, 2017
- Appointed by: Chris Christie
- Preceded by: John Molinelli
- Succeeded by: Dennis Calo

Personal details
- Born: Gurbir Singh Grewal; June 23, 1973 (age 53) Jersey City, New Jersey, U.S.
- Party: Democratic
- Education: Georgetown University (BS); College of William & Mary (JD)
- Gurbir Grewal's voice Gurbir Grewal's opening statements before the House Financial Services Committee; Recorded July 19, 2022

Gurbir Singh Grewal (/ˈɡɜːrbɪər ˈɡreɪwɑːl/; born June 23, 1973) is an American attorney and prosecutor who was formerly the Director of the Division of Enforcement for the Securities and Exchange Commission from July 2021 until his resignation, which became effective in October 2024. In October 2024, Grewal joined Milbank LLP’s New York office as a partner specializing in SEC enforcement matters.

Prior to his service with the SEC as the Director of Enforcement, Grewal served as the sixty-first attorney general of the State of New Jersey from January 2018 until July 2021. Appointed by Governor Phil Murphy, he was confirmed by the New Jersey Senate on January 16, 2018. He was the first Sikh-American attorney general in United States history. Grewal was formerly the county prosecutor of Bergen County, New Jersey, originally appointed in 2016; he was also the first Sikh American to be named a county prosecutor in the United States. He was the second South Asian to be a state attorney general after California's Kamala Harris in 2011.

== Early life and career ==
Grewal is the son of Punjabi Sikh Indian immigrants to the United States. He grew up in Fairfield Township, Essex County, New Jersey and graduated from West Essex High School. Grewal attended Bates College for one semester before transferring to the Georgetown University School of Foreign Service, receiving his B.S.F.S. degree in 1995. He earned a Juris Doctor from William & Mary Law School in 1999. He has served as president of the South Asian Bar Association of New York and a member of the New Jersey Asian Pacific American Lawyers Association.

== Career ==
Before becoming Bergen County's top law enforcement officer, Gurbir Grewal served as the chief of the Economic Crimes Unit at the U.S. Attorney's Office in New Jersey under former federal prosecutor Paul Fishman. New Jersey Governor Chris Christie nominated Grewal to lead the Bergen County Prosecutor's office in 2013, but Grewal was never scheduled for a New Jersey Senate confirmation hearing then. Grewal was confirmed by the State Senate when tapped by Christie the second time around in January 2016 as acting prosecutor, and was finalized in the role in November 2016. In this capacity, Grewal concentrated on fighting the opioid epidemic and white-collar crimes, and strengthening relations between police and communities. In July 2017, while Bergen County prosecutor, Grewal ordered the Mahwah, New Jersey police department not to enforce a ban on non-New Jersey residents using Mahwah parks, stating his concern that a ban could lead to antisemitic religious profiling against Orthodox Jews visiting from neighboring Rockland County, New York. On July 26, 2018, two WKXW radio show hosts were suspended for calling Grewal "turban man" on air. In September 2018, then-Bergen County sheriff Michael Saudino resigned under public official pressure, after secretly recorded comments were released disparaging Grewal's wearing a turban alongside derogatory remarks about other groups of people.

=== New Jersey attorney general ===
In March 2019, as New Jersey's attorney general, Grewal touted the first arrests resulting from a law signed in 2018 by New Jersey Governor Phil Murphy outlawing privately made firearms, stating, "When you see repeatedly the same address, with the same individuals, at the same location continuing to order parts for the same types of guns, some red flags have to go up, that what’s going on here is not somebody who’s an enthusiast or a hobbyist, but rather somebody who’s engaged in illegal trafficking. And that is part of the problem with ghost gun manufacturers, that they are playing fast and loose with our rules." Days later, Grewal filed the first of its kind lawsuit against a receiver blank manufacturer, U.S. Patriot Armory, accusing the company of violating New Jersey's privately made firearm ban by ignoring a cease-and-desist order to stop selling rifle-assembly kits to New Jersey buyers. Also in March 2019, Grewal filed lawsuits against ExxonMobil, DuPont, and 3M, accusing the companies of polluting sites in New Jersey; he stated, "We’re sending a strong message to polluters that no matter how big you are, or how powerful you are, or how long you’ve been getting away with contaminating your state’s natural resources, we are going to hold you accountable in court." On March 28, 2019, Grewal announced a directive to all 21 New Jersey county prosecutors to institute college campus outreach protocols to impede sexual violence at the collegiate level.

In April 2019, Grewal announced updated standards for dealing with bias incidents. Also in April 2019, he called for monitoring of comments on the Facebook page of "Rise Up Ocean County", a group which has been called a home for antisemitic sentiment targeting the rapidly growing Orthodox Jewish population of Lakewood and surrounding Ocean County, New Jersey. On April 26, 2019, Grewal asked for the resignation of the director of the Elizabeth, New Jersey Police Department amid a scandal over racist and sexist slurs and also replaced the Union County county prosecutor.

On May 1, 2019, Grewal announced the dismantling of an organized crime gambling and loansharking operation and also launched an investigation into prior corporate tax loopholes afforded at the time by the New Jersey Development Authority. On May 6, 2019, Grewal filed suit against the Department of Justice to force disclosure of any evidence of influence-peddling upon the Justice Department's decision to oppose legalized online gambling across the U.S. On May 8, 2019, Grewal indicated that the City of Newark had exceeded its statutory authority by affording civilians subpoena powers over the city's police department. On May 10, 2019, Grewal joined state attorneys general from across the country in filing a lawsuit against 20 generic pharmaceuticals companies, 11 of which were based in New Jersey, along with several individuals, accusing them of collusion and price-fixing. On May 14, 2019, Grewal announced a lawsuit against several large chemical companies, accusing them of selling toxic firefighting foam for decades while knowing the health risks they posed to the public and to the environment.

In June 2019, Grewal's office forced a Bloomfield restaurant which had posted a "males only" hiring sign to pay $1,000 and implement an anti-discrimination policy that explains how workers can file complaints, as well as training managers and staff about the anti-discrimination law; Grewal stated that gender discrimination would not be tolerated in the overall hiring process. In mid-June, Grewal filed a lawsuit against a Nevada gun dealer for selling high-capacity gun magazines illegally to an undercover agent in New Jersey, despite a prior cease-and-desist order issued to the company barring the marketing, selling, and shipping of high-capacity gun magazines to New Jersey residents.

On August 6, 2019, Grewal announced the creation of the first U.S. statewide program to support the mental health of police officers. The goal of the program would be to train officers in emotional resiliency and to help destigmatize mental health issues. On August 8, Grewal announced the dismantling of two major drug- and gun-trafficking criminal organizations, accompanied by the arrests of 28 individuals and the seizure of significant amounts of narcotics, ammunition, and cash.

In 2021, Grewal abolished mandatory minimums for six non-violent drug offenses, and allowed inmates who were serving mandatory minimum sentences for those crimes to request a court review and a new sentence.

=== U.S. SEC ===
On June 29, 2021, Grewal announced he would be resigning as New Jersey’s attorney general to take an appointment as Director of the U.S. Securities and Exchange Commission’s Division of Enforcement. His resignation as attorney general was effective July 16, 2021. His SEC appointment was effective July 26, 2021. Grewal worked to bring the cryptocurrency industry and Wall Street traders into compliance, and advocated for attorneys and auditors to protect investor interests. Under Grewal, the SEC imposed over $20 billion in fines and disgorgement in its enforcement actions. In October 2024, Grewal announced that he would be resigning from the SEC to enter private practice, effective October 11, 2024.

== Personal life ==
Gurbir Grewal is a resident of Glen Rock, New Jersey, in Bergen County. Grewal is a father of three, with his wife Amrit. He is also fluent in the Punjabi and Hindi languages.

== See also ==
- Governorship of Phil Murphy
- Indian Americans in New Jersey
- Notable people from Glen Rock, New Jersey
- United States constitutional law

Legal offices
| Preceded by Christopher Porrino | Attorney General of New Jersey; 2018–2021 | Succeeded by Andrew Bruck; Acting |
