= Lisa J. Hou =

U.S. Army major general

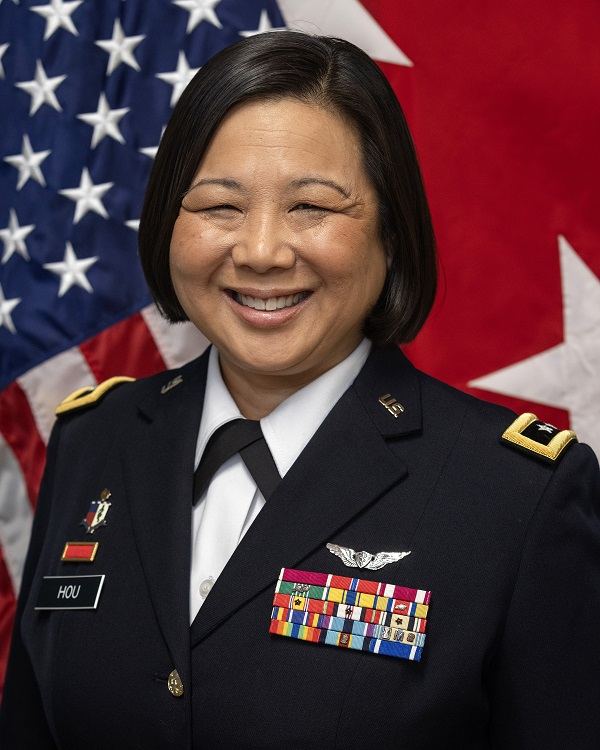
- Hou in 2024
- Born: 1971 (age 54–55)
- Alma mater: Bryn Mawr College (BA); University of Medicine and Dentistry of New Jersey (D.O.); United States Army War College (MSS); Rutgers University (MBA)
- Military career
- Service: United States Army
- Service years: 1994–present
- Rank: Major General
- Unit: New Jersey Army National Guard
- Commands: New Jersey Army National Guard Medical Command; New Jersey National Guard
- Wars: Iraq War; War in Afghanistan
- Awards: Legion of Merit; Bronze Star Medal
- Other work: Commissioner, New Jersey Department of Military and Veterans Affairs

Lisa J. Hou, D.O. (b. 1971) is an American physician and major general. As of July 2024, she is the Director of the Office of the Joint Surgeon General at the National Guard Bureau. She served as the Adjutant General of the New Jersey National Guard and Commissioner of the New Jersey Department of Military and Veterans Affairs from 2021 to 2024. She was the first Asian American and first female Adjutant General in the state.

== Early life and education ==
The daughter of Chinese immigrants, Hou was raised in Middletown and Rumson, and is a 1987 graduate of Rumson-Fair Haven Regional High School. She earned a bachelor's degree (B.A.) in political science from Bryn Mawr College. She joined the New Jersey Army National Guard in 1994 while a medical student at the University of Medicine and Dentistry of New Jersey – School of Osteopathic Medicine in Stratford. Dr. Hou received her Doctorate in Osteopathic Medicine (D.O.) in 1996. Upon graduation from medical school, Dr. Hou completed a transitional internship at Union Hospital, NJ (1997), a general surgery internship at St. Barnabas Medical Center, Livingston, NJ (1998) as well as a Otolaryngology/Facial Plastic Surgery residency at Union Hospital (2001). In 2002, Dr. Hou completed a Sleep Surgery Fellowship, Stanford University Medical Center, CA. Additionally, Dr. Hou earned her flight surgeon badge in 2010.

In addition to her training in medicine, Dr. Hou went on to earn a distinctive Master of Strategic Studies (MSS) from the United States Army War College in 2019 as well as a master's degree in Business Administration (MBA) from the Rutgers University - School of Business in 2022.

== Military career ==
In 2005, then Maj. Hou served in Iraq as a senior field surgeon for Echo Company, 50th Main Support Battalion, 42nd Infantry Division, New Jersey Army National Guard, where she performed routine and advanced emergency medical care for coalition soldiers and Iraqi civilians and maintained medical readiness for mass casualty trauma.

In 2011, then Lt. Col. Hou served in Afghanistan as the Field Surgeon for Charlie Company, 700th Brigade Support Battalion, 45th Infantry Brigade Combat Team. She was the sole medical provider with a team of combat medics on an Afghanistan National Army base and was responsible for providing routine and advanced emergency medical care in the combat theater for more than 600 coalition soldiers, contractors, and foreign nationals.

Since 2013, Brig. Gen. Hou has also served as the Region II representative for the National Guard Bureau (NGB) Medical Advisory Group and, from 2018 to 2020, she served as the Chair of the Army National Guard Credentials Certification and Privileging Preparation Board. In August 2020, she became the chair of the nationwide Army National Guard Medical Advisory Group until she was appointed as Acting Adjutant General of New Jersey in 2020 and confirmed as The Adjutant General of New Jersey in 2021.

In February 2024, Hou was promoted to major general. In July 2024, she was assigned as Director of the Office of the Joint Surgeon General at the National Guard Bureau.

She has been a resident of Belmar, New Jersey.

== See also ==
- Governorship of Phil Murphy
