= Kevin Corbett =

American transportation executive (born 1955)

Executive Director New Jersey Transit
- In office February 2018 – January 15, 2025
- Governor: Phil Murphy
- Preceded by: Steven Santoro
- Succeeded by: Kris Kolluri

Personal details
- Born: Kevin Stephen Corbett; December 5, 1955 (age 70)
- Spouse: Siobhan Alden (m. 1991)
- Education: Georgetown University

Kevin Stephen Corbett (born December 5, 1955) is an American transportation and economic development executive. He became President and CEO of New Jersey Transit (NJT), the New Jersey state public transportation agency, in February 2018.

== Early life ==
Corbett was born December 5, 1955. His father, Andrew Corbett, of Pelham, New York, was the chairman of A. J. Corbett & Sons, a steamship agency and maritime consultancy.

He is a graduate of Georgetown University. He serves as a Blue and Gold Officer for the U.S. Naval Academy. He was a fellow of Princeton School of Public and International Affairs.

== Career ==
Corbett was a vice president of the global transportation consulting firm AECOM.

Corbett was a vice president of Wilhelmsen Lines, a shipping company in Oslo, and was the general manager of its subsidiary in New York, the Barber West Africa Line. He has worked for the Port Authority of New York and New Jersey, the Empire State Development Corporation (Executive VP and COO) and Galliford Try.

Corbett has been on the board of the New York League of Conservation Voters, the Regional Plan Association, the Maritime Association of the Port of New York and New Jersey. and the Tri-State Transportation Campaign.

== New Jersey Transit ==
New Jersey Governor Phil Murphy has called NJT a "national disgrace". In January 2018, Murphy asked for resignation letters from approximately 20 senior staff members, and signed an executive order calling for a complete audit. Corbett was appointed by Murphy in January 2018. He will replace Steven Santoro, who announced he will resign in April 2018. At his introduction, Corbett said there is "untapped value" in the agency.

During his tenure, NJ Transit implemented the federally required Positive Train Control (PTC) safety system, with work completed in December 2020.

NJ Transit had no 'capital plan' when Corbett took over. He contracted one, expected in December 2019.

In February 2020 there were calls for his resignation citing the lack of improvement in service in his two year tenure.

In June 2020, Corbett revealed a 5-year Capital Plan with over $16 billion in capital spending and the agency's first 10-year Strategic Plan.

On December 9th, 2024, Corbett announced that he would resign from NJ Transit. His resignation takes effect on Jan 15, 2025. Corbett said that he had "recently accepted a new opportunity with one of our state’s prestigious universities that will allow me to remain deeply connected to the transportation sector, focusing on practical innovation, infrastructure and advocacy for our region."

== Personal life ==
Corbett married Siobhan Alden, a physician, in 1991. He and his wife reside in Mendham, New Jersey; both use NJ Transit regularly. The couple own a private home and a 5-acre farm in the town.

== See also ==
- Diane Gutierrez-Scaccetti
- Governorship of Phil Murphy
- George Warrington
- James Weinstein (New Jersey official)
- Richard A. White
