= Kris Kolluri =

American politician (born c. 1969)

Executive Director of the New Jersey Turnpike Authority
- Incumbent
- Assumed office February 9, 2026
- Governor: Mikie Sherrill
- Preceded by: James Carone

Executive Director of New Jersey Transit
- Incumbent
- Assumed office January 16, 2025
- Governor: Phil Murphy
- Preceded by: Kevin Corbett

Personal details
- Born: 1969 (age 56–57) Hyderabad, India
- Party: Democratic
- Education: Rutgers University, Camden (BS); Johns Hopkins University (MS); Georgetown University (JD)

Kris Kolluri (born c. 1969) is an American politician and transportation executive. He became President and CEO of New Jersey Transit (NJT), the New Jersey state public transportation agency, on January 16, 2025.

== Background ==
Kolluri specialized in redevelopment and transportation law as an attorney at Parker McCay of Marlton. Kolluri received a Bachelor of Science degree in Management and Marketing from Rutgers University, a Master's degree in International Business from Johns Hopkins University and a J.D. degree from Georgetown University. He lives in West Windsor Township with his wife and two daughters.

== Career ==
Kolluri was chief of staff to New Jersey Transportation Commissioner Jack Lettiere. In this capacity, he served as counselor to the Commissioner and managed the development and implementation of the department's legislative and regulatory policies and communications strategies.

Prior to working in state government, Kolluri held a variety of top positions in Congressional offices. Most recently he served as senior policy advisor to House Democratic Leader Richard A. Gephardt, heading the Member Support Program which was established to help freshman Members of Congress design and implement long-term strategic initiatives. In early 1998, Kolluri was tapped to be special advisor to Congressman Gephardt on India and Indian-American affairs.

Before he worked for Congressman Gephardt, Kolluri served as Congressman Robert E. Andrews' Legislative Director and his principal staffer on the International Relations Subcommittee on Asia and the Pacific.

Kolluri served as Commissioner of the New Jersey Department of Transportation (NJDOT), having been sworn into office on March 13, 2006.

On December 28, 2006, Kolluri served as acting governor, while New Jersey Governor Jon Corzine, the Senate president, Assembly speaker, and attorney general were all out of state. Under state law at the time, an acting governor had to be appointed whenever the governor is absent from the state. Since a 2006 constitutional amendment, New Jersey has had a lieutenant governor, second in the line of succession. The position was first filled by Kim Guadagno, elected with Chris Christie in November 2009.

Kolluri formerly served as head of the New Jersey Schools Development Authority, having taken office as of December 1, 2008, where he succeeded Scott Weiner.

Kolluri was the Chief Executive Officer (CEO) of the Gateway Development Commission, an agency formed under the auspices of the Port Authority of New York and New Jersey to construct a new railroad tunnel under the Hudson River connecting the U.S. states of New York and New Jersey, serving between June 2022 and July 2024.

=== NJ Transit ===
On December 9, 2024, it was announced that Kevin Corbett would resign from NJ Transit on January 15, 2025 with Kris Kolluri replacing him. On January 16, 2025, Kolluri was appointed interim president and CEO of NJ Transit, the largest mass transit agency in New Jersey, to serve through the remainder of Governor Phil Murphy's term in office ending in January 2026.

Following the election of Mikie Sherrill it was announced that Kolluri would continue his role as president and CEO of NJ Transit alongside potentially being appointed as Executive Director of the New Jersey Turnpike Authority pending approval by the NJTA board. Kolluri was voted and assumed the role of Executive Director on February 9, 2026.

== See also ==
- Indian Americans in New Jersey
- New Jersey Department of Education
