= New Jersey Turnpike Authority =

Government agency in the United States

Agency overview
- Formed: April 14, 1949
- Jurisdiction: Government of New Jersey
- Headquarters: Woodbridge Township, New Jersey, U.S.
- Employees: 2,128 (2022)
- Annual budget: $2.3 billion (2022)
- Agency executives: Priya Jain, Chair; Kris Kolluri, Executive Director
- Website: njta.gov

The New Jersey Turnpike Authority (NJTA) is a state agency responsible for maintaining the New Jersey Turnpike and the Garden State Parkway, which are two toll roads in the U.S. state of New Jersey. The agency is headquartered in Woodbridge Township, New Jersey.

The NJTA was created in 1949 to oversee construction and maintenance of the New Jersey Turnpike. In 2003, the authority assumed control of the Garden State Parkway, which had previously been maintained by an agency known as the New Jersey Highway Authority (NJHA).

== Board of Commissioners ==
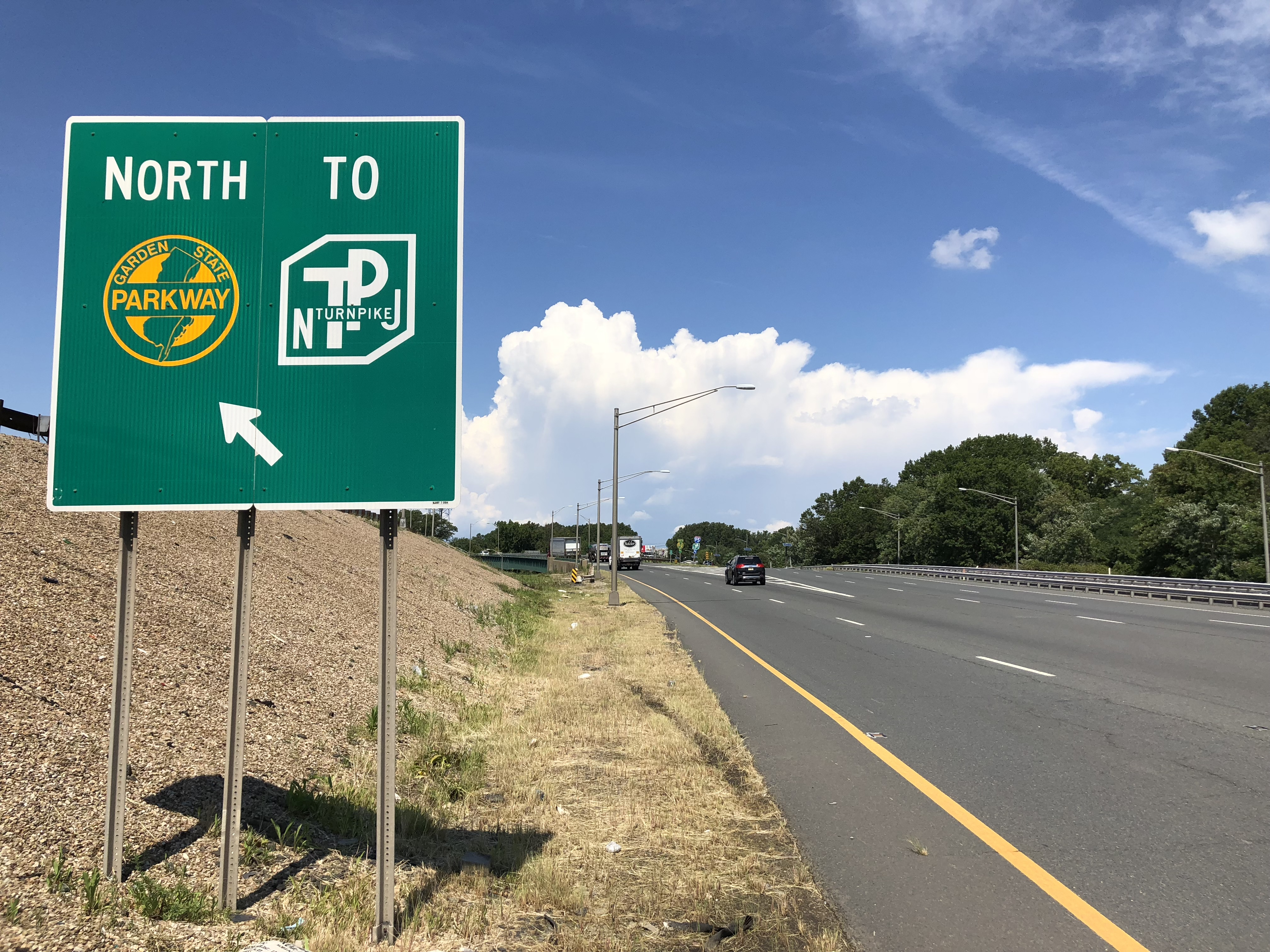
Signage directing traffic to both NJTA-maintained highways

The New Jersey Turnpike Authority is governed by an eight-person Board of Commissioners (with one current vacant seat). The members of the commission, along with the chairman, are appointed by the Governor of New Jersey. As of 2026, the commissioners are:

- Priya Jain – Chair
- Ulises E. Diaz – Vice Chair
- Michael R. DuPont – Treasurer
- Ronald Gravino – Commissioner
- Francisco Maldonado-Diaz – Commissioner
- Raphael Salermo – Commissioner
- John Wisniewski – Commissioner

== History ==
The New Jersey Turnpike Authority was created by special legislation on April 14, 1949, to regulate the New Jersey Turnpike, which opened to traffic on November 30, 1951. It issued revenue bonds to finance the road based solely on future tolls, without using tax money.

Another agency, known as the New Jersey Highway Authority, was established in 1952 and responsible for maintaining the Garden State Parkway, which opened to traffic in 1954. In July 2003, the New Jersey Legislature approved and Governor James McGreevey signed into law a bill consolidating the New Jersey Turnpike Authority and the New Jersey Highway Authority. The main headquarters of the Turnpike Authority before consolidation was in East Brunswick, while the main headquarters of the Highway Authority was in Woodbridge Township. A few years later, the headquarters of the consolidated Turnpike Authority was relocated to an eight-story office tower on Main Street in Woodbridge, near the interchange between the Turnpike and the Parkway at Turnpike exit 11 / Parkway exit 129.

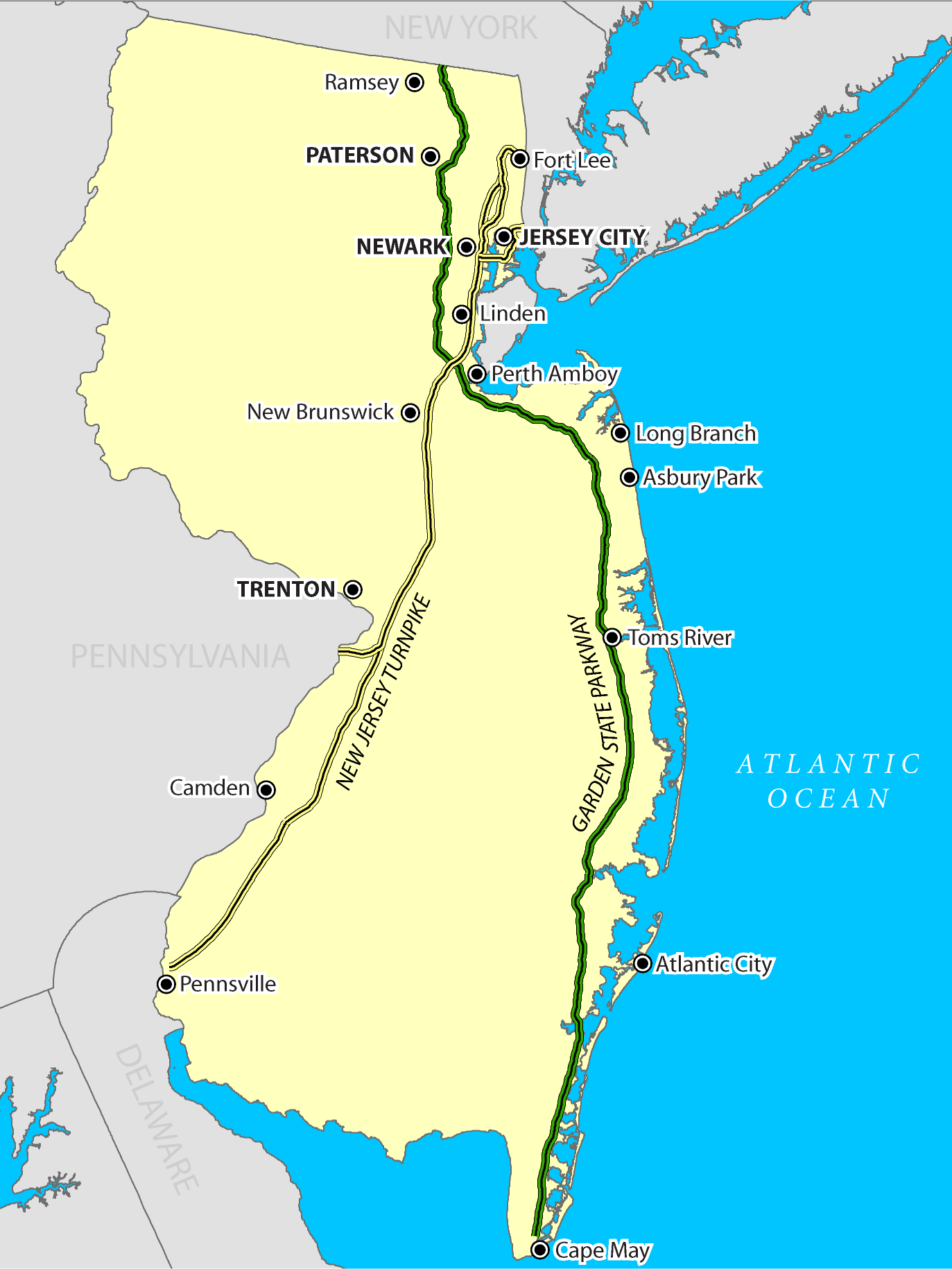
Map of New Jersey Turnpike and Garden State Parkway

The Woodbridge building that once housed the Highway Authority now houses the Statewide Traffic Management Center, from which Turnpike Authority personnel monitor traffic on the Turnpike and the Parkway, broadcast traffic and weather advisories to patrons over three AM radio channels, and operate more than 200 variable message and speed limit signs. The Authority also has closed-circuit TV cameras that show pictures of current traffic conditions on the Turnpike and the Parkway.

The Turnpike Authority is accountable for the inspection and structural integrity of more than 1,000 bridge structures on the Turnpike and Parkway, to comply with the federally mandated National Bridge Inspection Standards (NBIS).

On July 22, 2014, the New Jersey Turnpike Authority filed a federal lawsuit against Jersey Boardwalk Pizza, a pizza chain in Florida, for using a logo too similar to the signs for the Garden State Parkway. The suit was ultimately dismissed, despite the NJTA having spent $276,000 in legal fees.

In summer 2023 the old NJTA headquarters was demolished.

In November 2025 the website for NJTA was fully updated.

== Traffic management ==
The New Jersey Turnpike Authority is one third of the participants of a Traffic Management Center (TMC) called STMC (Statewide Traffic Management Center) located in Woodbridge Township.

STMC is also the home to New Jersey Department of Transportation and the New Jersey State Police. The STMC is staffed 24/7 and is responsible for the coordination & logistics of statewide resources during major incidents within the State of New Jersey.
