= Andrew Bruck =

American lawyer and politician

Acting Attorney General of New Jersey
- In office July 17, 2021 – February 14, 2022
- Governor: Phil Murphy
- Preceded by: Gurbir Grewal
- Succeeded by: Matt Platkin

Personal details
- Born: 1983 or 1984 (age 42–43)
- Party: Democratic
- Education: Princeton University (BA); Stanford University (JD)

Andrew Bruck (1982/1983) was the Acting Attorney General of New Jersey. He took office on July 17, 2021, after being appointed by Governor Phil Murphy. Effective February 14, 2022 Bruck was replaced as Acting Attorney General by Matt Platkin, following Platkin's appointment by Murphy on February 3, 2022.

Bruck was a federal prosecutor before joining the office of then-newly installed Attorney General Gurbir Grewal in January 2018 as Executive Assistant Attorney General. Bruck was subsequently promoted to First Assistant Attorney General. Grewal resigned effective July 16, 2021 to take a position with the U.S. Securities and Exchange Commission.

Bruck is openly gay and resides with his husband and their infant daughter.

Legal offices
Preceded by Gurbir Grewal	Attorney General of New Jersey; Acting; 2021–2022	Succeeded by Matt Platkin; Acting
