= PennEast Pipeline =

Location
- Start: Luzerne County, Pennsylvania
- To: Mercer County, New Jersey

General information
- Type: Natural gas
- Owner: PennEast Pipeline Company, LLC

Technical information
- Length: 115 mi (185 km)
- Diameter: 36 in (914 mm)

The PennEast Pipeline is a proposed project by PennEast Pipeline Company, LLC, a consortium of five energy companies, to move natural gas from the Marcellus Shale region in Pennsylvania to New Jersey. The proposed 36-inch (910 mm) pipeline would run from Dallas, Luzerne County to Pennington, Mercer County, New Jersey, a distance of approximately 115 miles (185 km); as currently contemplated, the maximum allowable operating pressure would be approximately 1,480 psi. The pipeline requires the condemnation of properties in the state of New Jersey, which the state has opposed. A ruling against such condemnation was handed down in September 2019.

== Ownership ==
The five founding energy partners of PennEast Pipeline consortium are Southern Company Gas, NJR Pipeline Company, South Jersey Industries, Spectra Energy Partners and UGI Energy Services.

== Legal hurdles ==
In order for construction on the pipeline to begin, several legal barriers must be crossed. The PennEast Pipeline Company must secure permits from several governing bodies, including the Federal Energy Regulatory Commission (FERC), the U.S. Army Corps of Engineers, and the Delaware River Basin Commission. Both the states of New Jersey and Pennsylvania must also issue environmental permits for the project. [3] In June 2017, the New Jersey Department of Environmental Protection rejected a water quality permit application. The reason cited was that the PennEast Pipeline Company did not submit all of the information that the application required. The company has said that they intend to supplement the application with the information the DEP has requested.

PennEast was able to obtain FERC approval in 2018, which included under the Natural Gas Act of 1938 the ability for PennEast to use eminent domain to secure property that the pipeline was to cross. About 40 parcels of property included land owned by the state of New Jersey. New Jersey sued to block PennEast from acquiring these properties, asserting a private company did not have the rights to exercise eminent domain on state property. In the United States Supreme Court case PennEast Pipeline Co. v. New Jersey, decided in June 2021, the Court affirmed that PennEast had been properly delegated the power of eminent domain from the federal government, to which by their nature, states had agreed to upon joining the union.

== Route ==
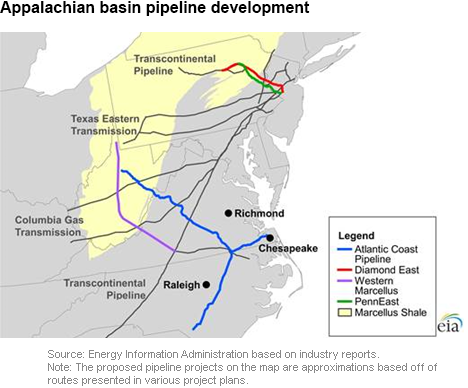
A map published by the Energy Information Administration showing, among other pipelines in the area, the proposed route of the PennEast pipeline

An interactive map published by the PennEast consortium shows a "proposed route" noted as subject to change beginning in Luzerne County in Pennsylvania and terminating in Mercer County, New Jersey. Community organizations in Pennsylvania and New Jersey have mounted strong responses to the consortium's proposal. Pennsylvania and New Jersey counties and municipalities traversed by the proposed pipelines are listed below.

=== Pennsylvania counties and municipalities ===
- Luzerne (Dalles Township, Kingston Township, West Wyoming Borough, Wyoming Borough, Jenkins Township, Plains Township, Laflin Borough)
- Carbon (Kidder Township, Lake Harmony Borough, Albrightsville Borough, Jim Thorpe Borough, Penn Forest Borough, Townamensing Township, Kunkletown Borough, Palmerton Borough)
- Northampton (Danielsville Borough, Moore Township, Bath Borough, Upper Nazareth Township, Lower Nazareth Township, Bethlehem Township, Williams Township, Lower Saucon Township)
- Bucks (Durham Township, Riegelsville Borough)

=== New Jersey counties and municipalities ===
- Hunterdon (Holland Township, Frenchtown Borough, Kingwood Township, Alexandria Township, Delaware Township, Stockton Borough, West Amwell Township, Lambertville)
- Mercer ( Hopewell Township, Lawrence Township)

== Additional / supporting facilities ==
In addition to the pipeline itself, the proposal also includes plans for several facilities that will be constructed above ground. they include four pig launcher/receivers, eight metering and regulating stations, eleven mainline valves, and a compressor station.

== Environmental impact ==
As the pipeline has not yet been built, its environmental impact can not be directly assessed as of yet. The Federal Energy Regulatory Commission performed a study to analyze the potential environmental impact of the project. This study led them to recommend measures to reduce the effects the pipeline construction would have on the environment. These measures consist of PennEast filing many additional documents detailing the company's responses to numerous environmental and cultural concerns. The measures also include contingencies for cases in which rare animal or plant life is discovered that would be impacted by the construction. They concluded that their recommendations, coupled with PennEast's plans for environmental management, would sufficiently mitigate the effects.

Environmental Advocacy groups remain largely unconvinced. "FERC has once again demonstrated its tremendous bias for, and partnership with, the pipeline industry," said Maya van Rossum, leader of the Delaware Riverkeeper Network. Doug O'Malley, president of Environment New Jersey, called the statement by the FERC a "disaster." David Pringle, state campaign director of Clean Water Action, suggested the FERC was serving a partisan interest over the interests of the people of New Jersey, suggesting "The FERC needs to remember it works for the people of the United States not PennEast."

== Public reception ==
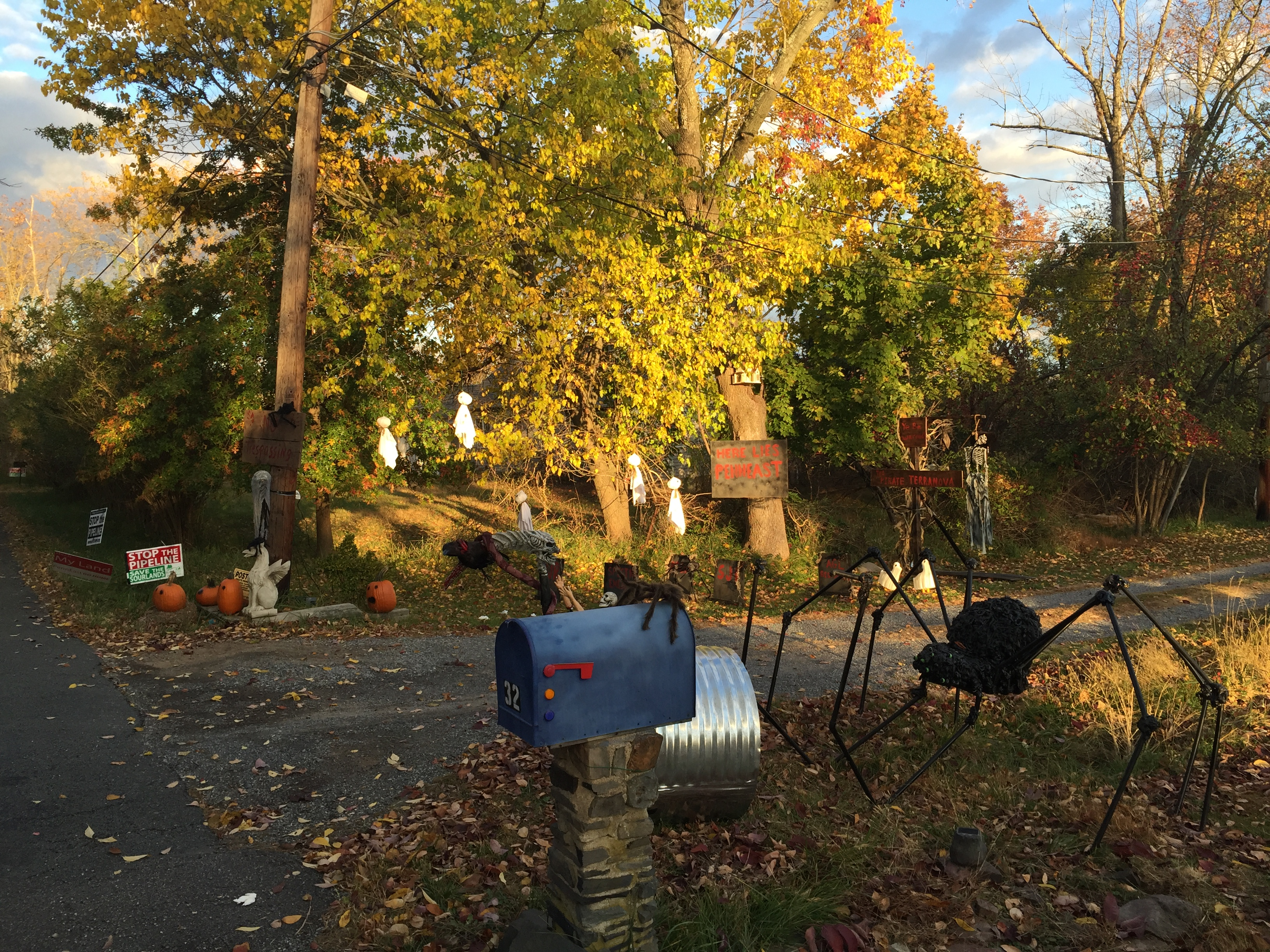
A Halloween display from one resident along the proposed route. The display includes a “Stop the Pipeline” lawn sign, and a hand-painted “Here Lies PennEast” sign.

There has been a considerable public pushback regarding the proposal for the pipeline. The first community meetings were organized by Berks Gas Truth. The most vocal have formed the group Stop the PennEast Pipeline. This group has created a website encouraging residents of the affected towns (see the ‘Route’ section above) to argue against the project. On this website, they propose that the pipeline is not needed, and the construction and the pipeline itself would pose a risk to wildlife and waterways. They also suggest that the pipeline would disrupt various cultural and recreational aspects of the communities that would be affected by the pipeline.

Clean Water Action has also worked furiously against the pipeline. State campaign director David Pringle said "PennEast would destroy open space and property rights, pollute our water, and exacerbate the climate crisis," at a protest in Trenton in October 2016. He was joined by representatives of the Sierra Club, Environment New Jersey, and the Delaware Riverkeeper Network. However, PennEast proponents argue that pipelines actually promote and preserve open space as a result of above-ground building restrictions associated with the pipeline and the restoration of the right-of-way to be open space.

The Delaware Riverkeeper Network (DRN) mainly focuses on the environmental impact that the pipeline would have on the Delaware River, one of the major waterways that the pipeline would cross. On their website, they discuss that the majority of the proposed route falls within the Delaware Watershed. In March 2016, the DRN filed a Constitutional Challenge against the Federal Energy Regulatory Commission (FERC). Their argument was that the Environmental Impact Statement released by the FERC was biased in favor of the pipeline. The court dismissed the case, however the DRN is appealing the decision.
