= Charles Stuart Platkin =

American author

Charles Platkin is an American author, academic, television producer and nutrition and public health advocate

Platkin is a professor at Hunter College and a blogger for Active.com and Everydayhealth.com. Platkin also publishes an annual Airline Snacking and Onboard Food Service Survey with health ratings for 12 domestic airlines. He also published Super Bowl exercise equivalents where football related activities are compared to foods typically eaten while watching the game (e.g., Six Chili's Fajita Beef Classic Nachos (Large)=Running 242.5 football fields.),

Platkin has a syndicated column, "Diet Detective", in newspapers and online, and a blog, DietDetective.com. Platkin was also the host and executive producer of WE TV's series, I Want To Save Your Life.

Platkin is a co-founder and strategic adviser at Diversion Books, a book publisher. Additionally, he founded Integrated Wellness Solutions—a health technology company.

== Publications ==
- The Diet Detective's All American Diet (Rodale, 2012)
- The Diet Detective's Diet Starter Kit (Diversion, 2011)
- The Diet Detective's Calorie Bargain Bible (Simon and Schuster, 2008)
- The Diet Detective's Count Down (Simon and Schuster, 2007)
- Lighten Up: Stay Sane, Eat Great, Lose Weight (Razorbill, 2005)
- Breaking the Fat Pattern: The Diet Detective's Plan to End the Cycle of Yo-Yo Dieting (Plume, 2005)
- The Automatic Diet (Hudson Street Press, 2004)
- Breaking the Pattern: The 5 Principles You Need to Remodel Your Life (Red Mill Press 2004)
