= Matthew Platkin =

American lawyer (born 1986)

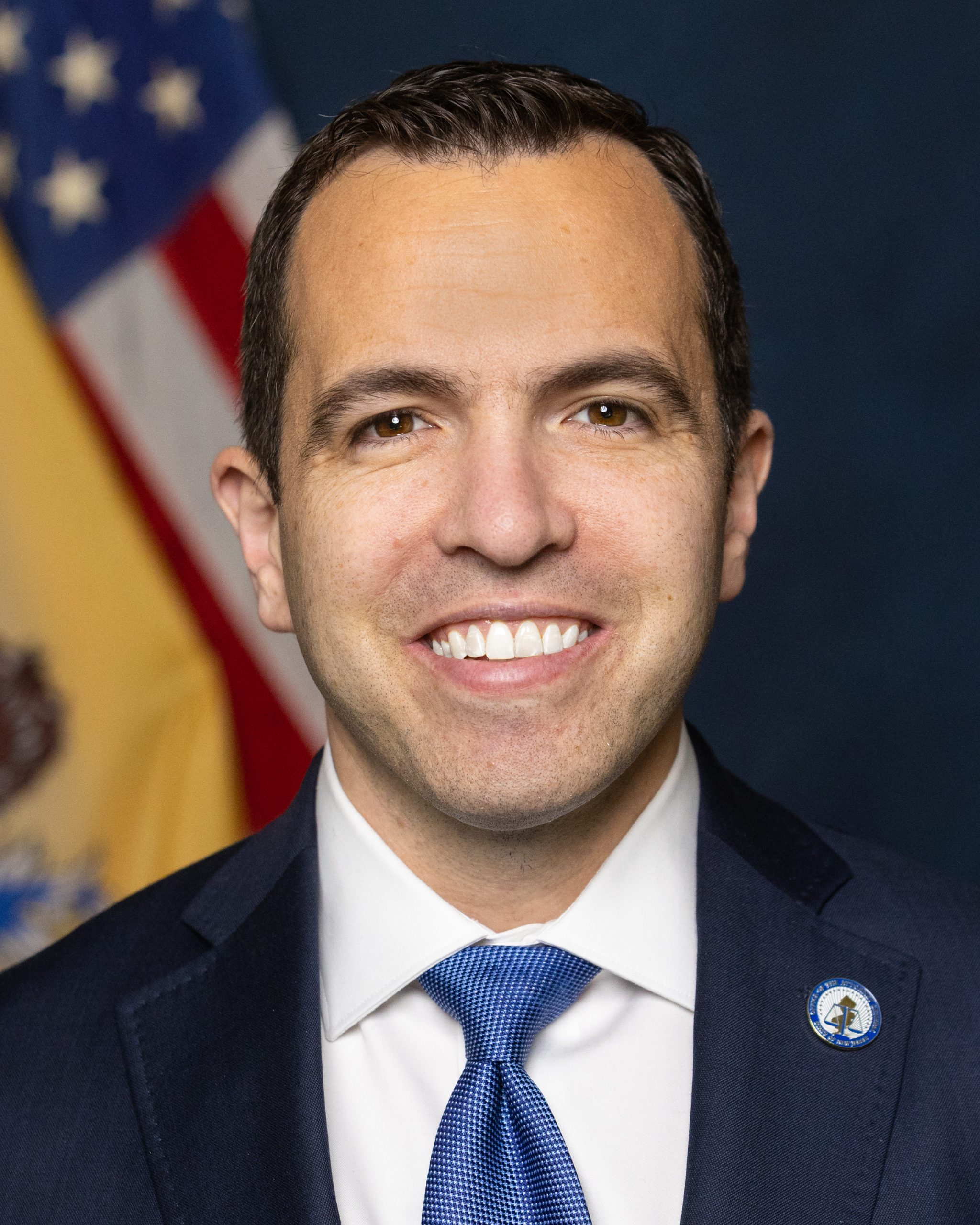
- Official portrait, 2024

62nd Attorney General of New Jersey
- In office February 14, 2022 – January 20, 2026
- Governor: Phil Murphy
- Preceded by: Andrew Bruck (acting)
- Succeeded by: Jennifer Davenport

Personal details
- Born: October 13, 1986 (age 40) Essex County, New Jersey
- Party: Democratic
- Education: Stanford University (BA, JD)

Matthew J. Platkin (born October 13, 1986) is an American attorney who served as the attorney general of New Jersey from 2022 to 2026.

== Early life and career ==
A resident of Montclair, New Jersey, Platkin was raised in Florham Park, New Jersey, and Morristown, New Jersey. He attended Madison High School, earned his undergraduate degree from Stanford University, and earned a Juris Doctor from Stanford Law School. He started his career with the Brookings Institution, advising Congress on economic recovery after the 2008 financial crisis. Following graduation from law school, he practiced law at Debevoise & Plimpton.

Platkin served as chief counsel to Governor Phil Murphy from January 2018 to October 2020. During the COVID-19 pandemic, he drafted executive orders and workforce policies for state government employees. He took a leave during January 2020 to serve as Senator Cory Booker's special counsel during the first impeachment of Donald Trump. After leaving the government, Platkin joined Lowenstein Sandler as Partner in the white collar and business litigation groups. Platkin is Jewish.

=== Attorney general of New Jersey ===
On February 3, 2022, Governor Murphy announced that he was appointing Platkin to serve as acting Attorney General. Platkin assumed office on February 14, 2022, succeeding Andrew Bruck as acting Attorney General. He assumed the position in full on September 29, 2022, after the confirmation of his appointment by the New Jersey State Senate. In May 2022, Platkin appointed his former colleague Lowenstein Partner Michael T.G. Long as Director of Division of Law in the Attorney General's Office.

Platkin gained attention when his office said in legal filings that state laws that create the "county line" ballot design are unconstitutional and that he and his office wouldn't defend it in Andy Kim's legal challenge. Murphy disagreed with the statement, claiming that "a legal defense of the statute permitting bracketing would have been appropriate and consistent with the actions of prior Attorneys General."

=== Multi-state action against use of treasury data ===
In February 2025, Platkin joined eighteen other state attorneys general in suing the Trump administration for providing the Department of Government Efficiency with access to the Treasury Department’s central payment system. Judge Jeannette Vargas of the District Court for the Southern District of New York granted their request for a preliminary injunction.

=== George Norcross indictment ===
On June 17, 2024, Platkin unsealed a 13 count indictment against former Democratic National Committee member and South Jersey power broker George Norcross, along with 5 of Norcross' associates. Norcross has long been the subject of controversies and prior investigations by both federal and state officials, but no charges had ever been filed. Despite being a Democrat, Norcross had been known for his close relationship with Republican former Governor Chris Christie. In the 2000s, Norcross had been secretly recorded saying: "In the end, the McGreeveys, the Corzines, they're all going to be with me. Not that they like me, but because they have no choice."

In the indictment, Platkin alleged that Norcross created a criminal enterprise and charging him with 13 counts of racketeering, theft by extortion, financial facilitation of criminal activity, and official misconduct. Along with Norcross, his attorney William M. Tambussi, his brother Philip A. Norcross, Cooper University Hospital board member Sidney R. Brown, developer John J. O’Donnell, and former Mayor of Camden Dana Redd were indicted. The indictment surrounds the procurement of property rights and the usage of tax-credits in the Camden Waterfront, the commercial and entertainment district of Camden, New Jersey.

Norcross attended the press conference announcing the indictment in person and attempted to follow Platkin's announcement with his own press conference in the lobby of Platkin's office. Once shut down by New Jersey State Police officers, Norcross held his impromptu press conference outside the building, claiming "I want[ed] to witness an extraordinary embarrassment and outrageous conduct from a government official who stands up there and tries to act like he’s holier than thou." Norcross then demanded Platkin try the case himself, along with calling the state Attorney General a "coward" and told him to "Buckle up."

On February 26, 2025, the 13 count indictment was dismissed by New Jersey Superior Court Judge Peter E. Warshaw Jr. who wrote that the indictment “must be dismissed because its factual allegations do not constitute extortion or criminal coercion as a matter of law.” He concluded that there was no evidence of a racketeering conspiracy and that even if there were, the charges were brought too many years after the crimes alleged and were therefore “time-barred.” Platkin said that he planned to appeal the decision. On January 30, 2026, a three-judge appellate panel unanimously upheld the dismissal. The court found that the factual allegations did not legally support extortion or criminal coercion, ultimately collapsing the racketeering charges. On February 17, 2026, the state Attorney General’s Office announced it would not ask the state Supreme Court to revive the charges.

== Personal life ==
Platkin and his wife, Sophia, live in Montclair with their son and daughter. During a press conference published by C-SPAN on December 22, 2025, it was disclosed by Attorneys General Rob Bonta and Dan Rayfield that Platkin's nickname is "The Mighty Platkin."

Legal offices
Preceded by Andrew Bruck	Attorney General of New Jersey; 2022–2026	Succeeded by Jennifer Davenport
